= Narada sting operation =

Sting operation in West Bengal targeting high ranking Trinamool politicians

The Narada sting operation was a sting operation carried out by journalist Mathew Samuel targeting high-ranking officials and politicians of the All India Trinamool Congress (AITC). It showed several politicians and a high-ranked police officer accepting cash bribes in exchange for providing unofficial favors to a company.

Performed in 2014 for the Indian news-magazine Tehelka, it was published on a private website months before the 2016 West Bengal Assembly elections.

As of June 2017, the Central Bureau of Investigation (CBI), Enforcement Directorate (ED) and a parliamentary ethics committee are probing the case. The Trinamool Congress has rejected the allegations and has claimed that the money was received in the way of donations.

== Background ==
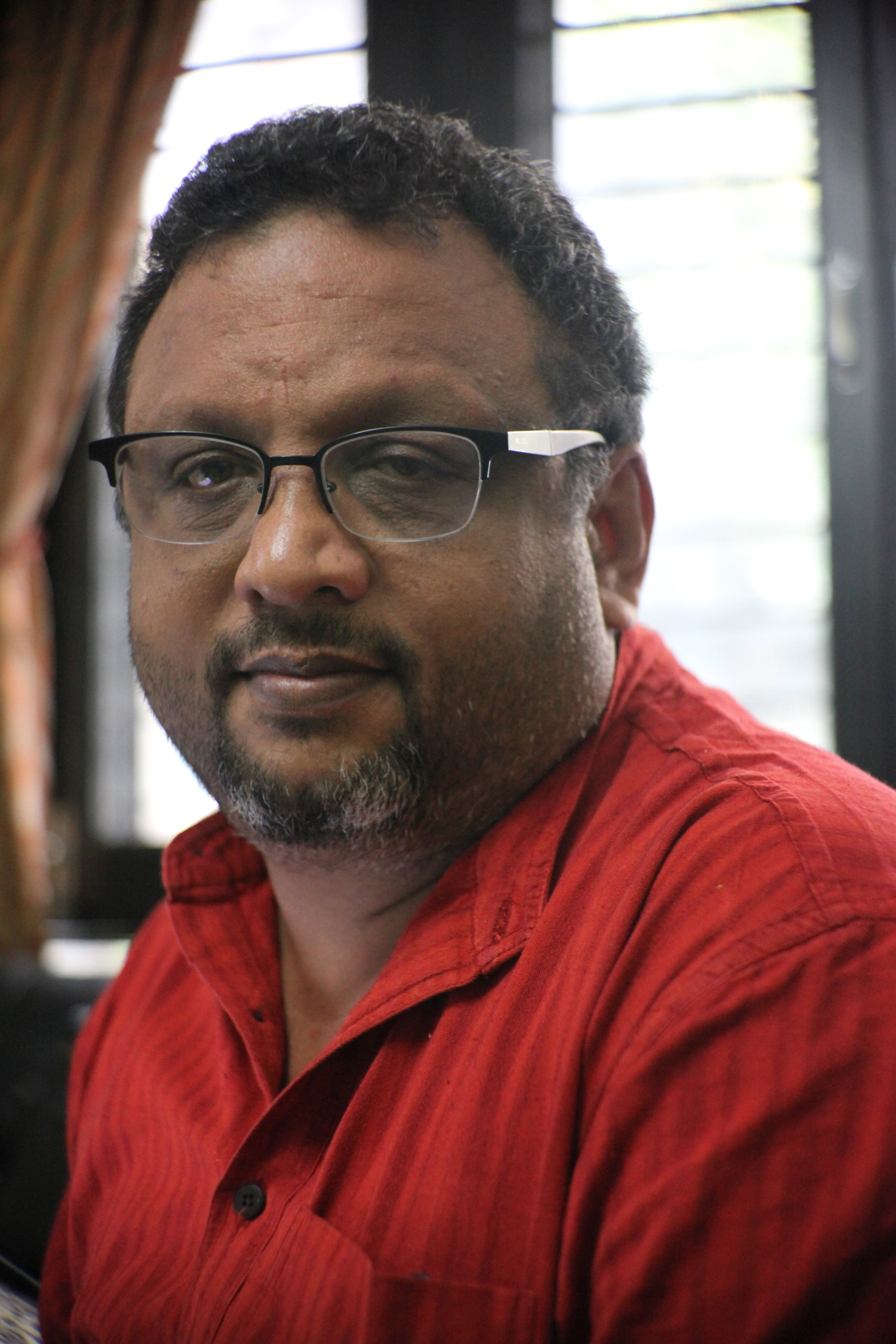
Mathew Samuel

Mathew Samuel is a former managing editor of Tehelka, a news magazine known for its investigative journalism and sting operations. He was one of the main principals behind the sting operation West End which spawned a miniature democratic crisis in 2001 and eventually led to the resignation of Defence Minister George Fernandes and later, the conviction of Bharatiya Janata Party (BJP) President Bangaru Laxman.

Around 2014, the Tehelka administration floated the idea of a sting operation in an effort "to come back into the market with a good story; with a bang". Samuel and his team initially opted for either Madhya Pradesh or Himachal Pradesh, but the opportunities never materialized. The ruling government in Madhya Pradesh was led by BJP and Samuel did not wish to be identified as a journalist who solely targeted the BJP governments whilst the political atmosphere of Himachal Pradesh was too quiet to be conducive for a sting operation.

It was around this time the Saradha Group financial scandal surfaced in West Bengal. Samuel felt that the corruption unearthed until then was only "the tip of the iceberg" and the team accordingly zeroed in on the politicians of West Bengal as their target.

== Operation ==
In an interview with The Telegraph, Mathew Samuel said he was inspired by Israeli Mossad officer Mike Harari. He had asked a friend to create a cover for him as a high official of the fictitious Chennai-based firm Impex Consultancy Solutions. An Aadhaar card in the name of Santhosh Shankaran was issued for Samuel and social-media profiles were created.

While trying to gauge the mood of the public, they chanced upon a taxi-driver who introduced them to a person who was locally known as 'Tiger'. Samuel claims that 'Tiger' initially introduced him to Iqbal Ahmed, the then deputy mayor of the Kolkata Municipal Corporation, and IPS officer S. M. H. Mirza. They were then supposedly acquainted with Sultan Ahmed (Iqbal's brother), Subrata Mukherjee, Firhad Hakim and Aparupa Poddar. Mirza also introduced him to Madan Mitra and Mukul Roy. And, each of these meetings proliferated in the development of further connections. In Samuel's words: "It was almost like a chain reaction".

In the 52 hours of footage made by Samuel and his colleague Angel Abraham around 2014, many prominent politicians resembling Members of Parliament Mukul Roy, Saugata Roy, Kakoli Ghosh Dastidar, Prasun Bannerjee, Suvendu Adhikari and Sultan Ahmed, and state ministers Madan Mitra, Subrata Mukherjee and Firhad Hakim, and Iqbal Ahmed were seen accepting alleged bribes in the form of wads of cash in exchange for doing unofficial favors for Impex Consultancy Solutions floated by Samuel himself. One more person named Sujay Bhadra alias Shantu, the then PA of Member of Parliament Abhishek Banerjee who is the nephew of Mamata Banerjee, was also seen in the video together with Karan Sharma, a close aide of Abhishek Banerjee.

== Funding ==
Whilst Samuel initially claimed that K. D. Singh, a Rajya Sabha MP of the Trinamool Congress and majority owner of Tehelka, was in the dark about the entire operation and he was a 'lone-wolf', he later retracted his claims and asserted that Singh knew and funded the entire operation. He claimed that the budget of the operation was initially set at ₹2,500,000 (equivalent to ₹3.5 million or US$36,000 in 2023) but was later increased to ₹8,000,000 (equivalent to ₹11 million or US$120,000 in 2023), as the number of potential targets increased vastly. The police subsequently filed a criminal case against Singh expecting that a large part of the sum might have been harvested from his chit fund business in West Bengal. However, Singh refuted his involvement with any aspect of the sting.

== Release ==
A edited portion of the sting operation tapes were released to the public through the website naradanews.com after a nearly two-year lag in 2016. This was attributed by Samuel to the inertia of the Tehelka administration in publishing the tapes.

== Reactions ==
The Trinamool Congress initially denied any connection with the sting operation, alleging it to be a product of political conspiracy and the video to be entirely forged. Trinamool party supremo and the Chief Minister of West Bengal-Mamata Banerjee alleged it to be a smear campaign by the opposition manifesting from vendetta-politics. Later, the Trinamool Congress claimed that the money received was in the form of a donation. The subsequent CBI investigations were branded as witch-hunts and to be a product of vested political interests. Trinamool MP Dinesh Trivedi was noted to be a dissenting voice and asked for the resignation of the accused.

The Communist Party of India (CPIM) and the Bharatiya Janata Party (BJP) organised mass protests demanding the resignation of the politicians involved.

== Fallout and investigations ==
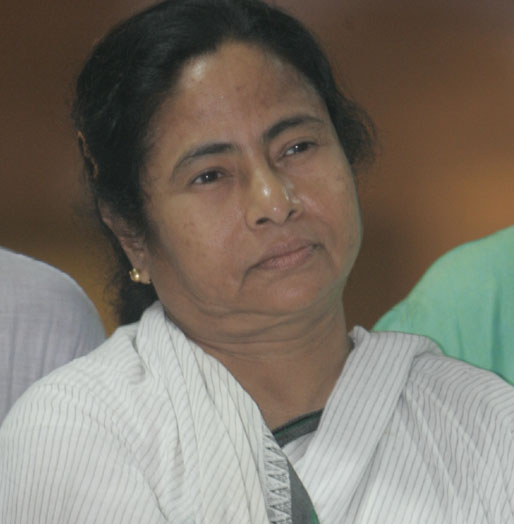
Mamata Banerjee, Chief Minister of West Bengal and leader of the All India Trinamool Congress.

=== Political ===
There was apparently no fallout from the sting operation in the 2016 assembly elections, contrary to expectations of Indian media. The AITC government returned to power with an absolute majority. This was proclaimed by Mamata Banerjee in her victory speech after the elections as an endorsement of the honesty of the party.

=== Legal ===
On 17 June 2016, the state initiated the first legal measures and ordered a probe by Kolkata police. Soon, three public-interest litigations from the Indian Congress party and BJP were filed in Calcutta High Court asking for an impartial probe in light of the influential positions held by the accused. The State of West Bengal, along with the accused, asked for a probe by the state investigation team or by a special investigation team, while the petitioner pushed for a probe by a central agency.

The local police was also accused of heckling Samuel, after summoning him for running alleged extortion-rings and interrogating him over the sting-issue.

The state subsequently initiated its own probe which booked Samuel under multiple sections of the IPC 469 (forgery to harm reputation), 500 (defamation), 120(B) (criminal conspiracy) etc. On 5 August 2016, the High Court stayed the state probe for ad infimum, observing that the police cannot run a concurrent investigation along with a court-monitored probe.

On 18 March 2017, the state initiated disciplinary proceedings against S. M. H. Meerza, a high-ranking officer in the Indian Police Service. He was the lone person (of all those who were filmed in the video tape to have accepted cash-bribe), to have been subject to some form of sanction by the state.

==== CBI Investigation ====
The CBI was asked to probe the case after the court raised doubts regarding the impartiality of the probe being conducted by the West Bengal Police and the footage was certified as authentic by the Central Forensic Laboratory. Whilst the state objected to the CBI handling the probe, a bench of the Court, presided by Chief Justice Nishita Mhatre subsequently held that the findings of the sting were not undermined by the legality of Mathew Samuel's actions and that an investigation by an impartial agency would be proceeded with.

The Supreme Court of India also rejected an appeal by the state, allowing the CBI probe to continue.

On 17 April 2017, the CBI filed a First Information Report against 12 Trinamool leaders for "criminal conspiracy". The CBI also subsequently summoned all of the involved figures, to assist in the investigation.

Aparupa Poddar confessed to have taken an amount of 3 lakh INR but claimed innocence as to any ulterior motive. She also claimed to have worked per the advice of Iqbal Ahmed. Iqbal Ahmed admitted to have accepted the cash but asserted to have utilized it in the development of a Maidan based sports-club, Mohammedan S.C. (Kolkata). Subrata Mukherjee too admitted to have accepted an amount of 3 lakh INR. Sougata Ray rejected the video as forged and claimed that he did not know Samuel. S.M.H. Meerza initially denied accepting any cash but later conceded to the veracity of the tape and claimed that he has donated the entire amount to an orphanage.

The investigation subsequently hit a road-block as certain portions of the footage (a prior to the) were found to be missing from the submitted footage. Samuel claimed to have deleted the non-necessary parts of the footage, whilst transferring them to the laptop from his iPhone and to have forgotten the password for the iPhone folder, which contained the cut-out portions. The CBI subsequently contacted Apple Inc. to retrieve the contents of the folder but whilst denying to share the password citing privacy requirements, they confirmed that the entire sting-footage had indeed been shot by an iPhone. Recent developments indicated that the CBI was in touch with professional hackers to gain access to the folder.

==== Enforcement Directorate investigation ====
The Enforcement Directorate is also running a parallel investigation. It has lodged a case about misappropriation of public funds under Anti-Corruption-Act and has issued multiple summons to the accused and Samuel, himself.

=== Ethics committee ===
Since the sting operation involved Members of Parliament, a Lok Sabha ethics committee was also set up to initiate a probe to determine if the persons committed a breach of privilege of the house concerned. The committee sat only once after the incident.

== Current status ==
In January 2021 the CBI sought sanction from then West Bengal Governor Jagdeep Dhankhar to prosecute Firhad Hakim, Madan Mitra, Subrata Mukherjee and Sovan Chatterjee in the Narada case. On 8 May the Governor granted the CBI permission to prosecute the four leaders. The CBI arrested all the four leaders on 17 May. Biman Banerjee, the Speaker of the West Bengal Legislative Assembly, argued that the arrests were illegal as those were made on the basis of the Governor's permission. Mathew Samuel questioned why BJP leader Suvendu Adhikari was not arrested by the CBI. The Bankshall Court (Special CBI court) granted interim bail to the four leaders on the same day they were arrested. However, a division bench headed by the Acting Chief Justice of Calcutta High Court stayed the lower court's order on the same night. Then the High Court ordered to place the arrested leaders under house arrest. Justice Arindam Sinha of Calcutta High Court criticised the way how the High Court dealt with the case. "We have been reduced to a mockery," he said in a letter to the Acting Chief Justice Rajesh Bindal. On 28 May the High Court granted interim bail to the four arrested leaders.
