= Pushp Sharma =

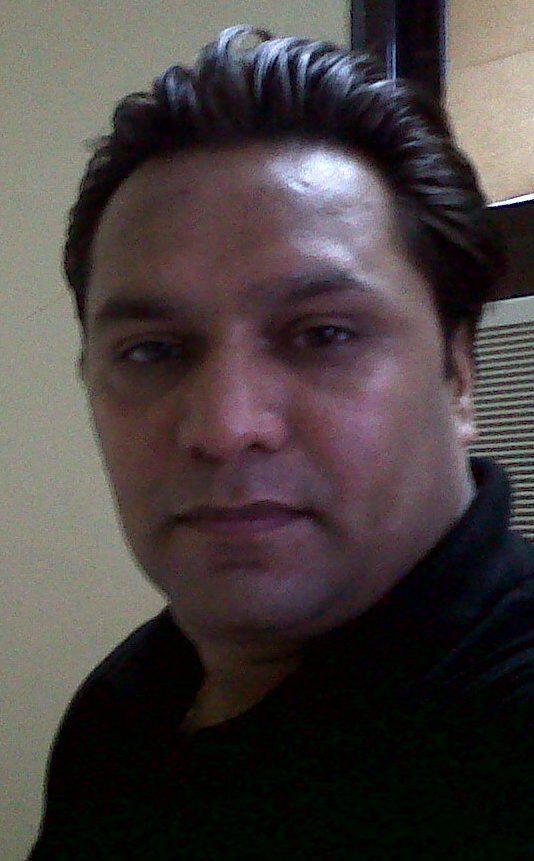
Pushp Sharma

Pushp Sharma is an investigative journalist known for exposing the malaise of paid news in the Indian media industry through the sting operation series code-named "Operation 136" that he conducted for Cobrapost. The investigation revealed how some of India's biggest news organizations and media houses were ready to influence the elections by favouring a party and by planting false news items against the opposition in exchange for money.

The undercover investigation 'Operation 136:Part 1', released on 26 March 2018, exposed 17 media houses. But only some videos of 'Operation 136: Part II' were released due to a restraining order brought by the Delhi High Court on the plea of Dainik Bhaskar, one of the media houses stung during the investigation.

Pushp Sharma has been the recipient of the International Press Institute Award (Vienna) for ‘Excellence in Journalism’ in year 2011 for his story 'Rent a Riot', published in Tehelka, which exposed Sri Ram Sene's leadership agreeing to organize a riot in exchange for money.
