= Peshok Tea Garden =

- Village
- Location in West Bengal, India Peshok Tea Garden (India)
- Coordinates: 27.067343°N 88.386667°E
- Country: India
- State: West Bengal
- District: Darjeeling

Population (2011)
  - Total: 4,200
- Time zone: UTC+5:30 (IST)
- Lok Sabha constituency: Darjeeling
- Vidhan Sabha constituency: Kurseong
- Website: darjeeling.gov.in

Peshok Tea Garden is a village in the Rangli Rangliot CD block in the Darjeeling Sadar subdivision of the Darjeeling district in the state of West Bengal, India.

== Geography ==
Places and tea estates in the north-eastern portion of Darjeeling Sadar subdivision (including Rangli Rangliot CD block) and Kurseong subdivision in Darjeeling district
CT: census town, R: rural/ urban centre, N: neighbourhood, H: hill centre, NP: national park/ wildlife sanctuary, TE: tea estate, TA: tourist attraction
Abbreviations used in names – TG for Tea Garden (town/village), TE for Tea Estate
Owing to space constraints in the small map, the actual locations in a larger map may vary slightly

=== Location ===
Peshok Tea Garden is located at 27.067343°N 88.386667°E.

=== Area overview ===
The map alongside shows the eastern portion of the Darjeeling Himalayan hill region and a small portion of the terai region in its eastern and southern fringes, all of it in the Darjeeling district. In the Darjeeling Sadar subdivision 61.00% of the total population lives in the rural areas and 39.00% of the population lives in the urban areas. In the Kurseong subdivision 58.41% of the total population lives in the rural areas and 41.59% lives in the urban areas. There are 78 tea gardens/ estates (the figure varies slightly according to different sources), in the district, producing and largely exporting Darjeeling tea. It engages a large proportion of the population directly/ indirectly. Some tea gardens were identified in the 2011 census as census towns or villages. Such places are marked in the map as CT (census town) or R (rural/ urban centre). Specific tea estate pages are marked TE.

Note: The map alongside presents some of the notable locations in the subdivision. All places marked in the map are linked in the larger full screen map.

== Demographics ==
According to the 2011 Census of India, Peshok Tea Garden had a total population of 4,200 of which 2,040 (49%) were males and 2,160 (51%) were females. There were 387 persons in the age range of 0 to 6 years. The total number of literate people in Peshok Tea Garden was 2,817 (67.07% of the population over 6 years).

== Economy ==
British owners who controlled 90% of the tea plantations in the Darjeeling Himalayan hill region started selling off their properties in 1947 and by 1956, the ownership of many tea gardens changed hands. It was a difficult situation for the young inexperienced Indian owners and fierce competition in tea auctions demanded improvements in the standards of the tea industry. There have been improvements but the going has been tough for many tea gardens.

The Peshok Tea Garden was shut down in 2017 by the Alchemist Group owned by K.D. Singh, a Trinamool Congress member of the Rajya Sabha. However, there is no formal notification about the closure. There are reports about the Alchemist Group having sold two other tea gardens - Dooteria and Kalej Valley. An effort has been made by the workers to run Peshok Tea Garden with hand-made tea. Gorkha Janmukti Morcha is the predominant trade union in the 87 tea gardens of the hill region.

Dooteriah Tea Garden with 1,354 workers, Kalej Valley with 642 workers and Peshok with 570 workers have been closed since 2015 but no official lockout notice was served. The gardens were owned by the Alchemist Group and later changed hands to Trident. In 2019, the West Bengal government declared the gardens officially locked out.
