= The Death of a Soldier Told by His Sister =

2021 book by Olesya Khromeychuk

- Author: Olesya Khromeychuk
- Language: English
- Genre: Memoir, essay
- Publisher: ibidem
- Publication date: 2021
- Media type: Print (hardback, paperback), e-book, audiobook
- Pages: 224
- ISBN: 978-1-80096-121-0

A Loss: The Death of a Soldier Told by His Sister is a 2021 work of memoir and essay by Ukrainian-born historian and writer Olesya Khromeychuk. It was published in the UK as The Death of a Soldier Told by His Sister. The book is about her brother, who died in 2017 during the War in Donbas. First published in 2021, book was republished in 2022 with additional chapters, following the full-scale Russian invasion of Ukraine.

== Reception ==
A review in the Los Angeles Review of Books discussed the work’s effort to humanise the war in Ukraine for English-speaking readers through the author’s account of grief and loss.

Literary Review published a review characterizing the book as "tender and courageous".

A review in the Journal of Power Institutions in Post-Soviet Societies described it as an "unorthodox but important contribution" to writing on the war in Ukraine, noting its focus on the human impact of war, rather than scholarly analysis.
