= DMM =

DMM may refer to:

== Businesses ==
- DMM Corporation (Digital Media Mart), a Japanese company which sold video games including eroge
  - DMM.com, its later incarnation
- DMM Wales, a Welsh manufacturer of rock-climbing equipment

== Science and technology ==
- Digital multimeter, a multi-functional electronic measuring instrument
- Digital Molecular Matter, a computer game physics engine developed by Pixelux
- Dimethylmercury, an organic compound containing mercury
- Direct metal mastering, a vinyl record manufacturing technology by Teldec
- Disease Models & Mechanisms, a journal by the Company of Biologists
- Dynamic-maturational model of attachment and adaptation, a transdisciplinary model describing relationship dynamics and attachment theory

== Other uses ==
- Daniel Martin Moore, American singer
- Domestic Mail Manual, a U.S. Postal Service guide
- King Fahd International Airport (IATA code: DMM), Dammam, Saudi Arabia
- Project DMM, a Japanese music group whose work is used on TV show
- Dharmavaram Junction railway station (station code: DMM) in Andhra Pradesh, India
