= Aniruddha Bahal =

Indian journalist and writer

- Occupation: Journalist
- Organization: Cobrapost
- Notable work: Bunker 13 (2003) Crack in the Mirror (1991) The Emissary (2010) The Adventures of Rhea: The Cobrapost Affair (2015) A Taste For Trouble : Memories From Another Time (2021)

Aniruddha Bahal is the founder and editor-in-chief of Cobrapost, an Indian news website. Prior to founding Cobrapost, he co-founded Tehelka.

== Early life and education ==
Bahal was born in Allahabad and is a university graduate. He moved to Delhi in 1991 where he began his journalistic career by writing and editing some articles at the Outlook and the India Today. In 1999, he co-founded Tehelka.com – a news website, with Tarun Tejpal and another colleague from the Outlook after "an investor with deep pockets" agreed to underwrite their startup, according to the Independent.

== Work ==
In 2003, Bahal wrote an espionage thriller Bunker 13. Its "hipster-slang-spitting antihero", states an article on Bahal in the UK-based newspaper the Independent, "shoots smack, snorts speed, runs guns, administers date-rape drugs" and a scene therein went on to win the Literary Review's Bad Sex in Fiction Award.

In 2005, Bahal founded and became the editor-in-chief of the online news magazine Cobrapost. It is particularly known for its undercover sting operations.

In 2008, he started hosting The Tony B Show for Channel V.

== Bibliography ==
- Crack in the Mirror (1991)
- Bunker 13 (2003)
- The Emissary (2010)
- The Adventures of Rhea: The Cobrapost Affair (2015)
- A Taste For Trouble : Memories From Another Time (2021)
