= Home & Travel =

European satellite TV channel

Home & Travel (formerly Cyprus Direct TV) is a free to air European satellite TV channel, primarily targeting the British market through Sky Satellite. It is a real estate and travel telemarketing channel that gives viewers the option to reserve a property or a holiday trip to Cyprus. The company called Travel Media is the owner of the channel.

The 6-hour daily programmes from BuySell International Real Estate are repeated throughout 24 hours programme. BuySell broadcasts usually feature introductory lifestyle documentaries and properties for sale.

Home & Travel advertises properties for sale by broadcasting:

- Property advertorials (of approx. 4 minute duration) promoting projects or private properties
- Information on Cyprus, the buying process and various financial issues
- Testimonials from clients
- Documentaries on the various regions of Cyprus

On Friday 8 December 2006, Cyprus Direct TV rebranded to Home & Traveland started broadcasting Travel offers.
