= Endeavour Press =

Former British publishing company

- Founded: 2011
- Founders: Matthew Lynn, Richard Foreman
- Country of origin: United Kingdom

Endeavour Press was a British independent publishing company founded in 2011 by Matthew Lynn and Richard Foreman. Endeavour started as an e-book publisher of out of print books, but grew to sign up frontlist titles from new authors in seven different imprints, including a print arm. The company specialised in thrillers, historical fiction, romance and non-fiction, but their several imprints encompassed horror, fantasy, science-fiction, westerns and literary fiction as well.

Endeavour published books by over 500 authors, including Charles Spencer, 9th Earl Spencer, Graham Diamond, Jonathan Lynn and Virginia Cowles.

On 31 January 2018 Endeavour Press went into voluntary liquidation. The two founders differed in company policy, and subsequently set up their own separate publishing companies, Endeavour Media with Matthew Lynn and Sharpe Books with Richard Foreman.
