= Lume Books =

London-based publishing company

Lume Books is an independent publishing company based in London. Founded in 2018 by Matthew Lynn, Lume has published many award-winning authors including Marjorie Bowen, A. J. P. Taylor, Paula DiPerna, Nick Thorpe, Wendy Perriam, Ramsey Campbell, Alan Palmer and Robert E. Howard.

== History ==
Endeavour Media was formed following the closure of Endeavour Press, which Lynn had co-founded in 2011. In 2020, Endeavour Media rebranded as Lume Books.

== Imprints ==
In early 2019, the publisher launched an audiobook imprint called Endeavour Waves. A month later it announced the launch of Endeavour Keys, an imprint dedicated to biographies of music icons.
