= Permit Reply Mail =

Class of US Postal Service mail service

Permit Reply Mail is a class of mail service provided by the United States Postal Service. It is described in section 505 of the Domestic Mail Manual and is primarily used for reply envelopes containing optical discs.

== Netflix ==
Netflix, a media rental company, uses Permit Reply Mail to send its discs to consumers. In 2007, the Postal Service estimated that the excess manual handling required for its discs cost it roughly $21 million per year. The Postal Regulatory Commission ruled in 2010 that the Postal Service had given Netflix preferential treatment to competitors like GameFly or HebrewReader.
