= Cobrapost =

Non-profit Indian news website

- Cobrapost Logo
- Founder: Aniruddha Bahal
- Founded: 2003; 23 years ago
- Country: India
- Based in: New Delhi
- Language: English, Hindi
- Website: www.cobrapost.com

Cobrapost is a non-profit Indian news website that was founded in 2005 by Aniruddha Bahal – the co-founder of Tehelka. It is particularly known for its undercover investigative journalism.

== Description ==
According to Kalyani Chadha, Cobrapost led by Aniruddha Bahal consolidated undercover sting-generated news genre in India in 2005. Its secretly recorded conversations with 11 elected members of Indian parliament who were aired by Aaj Tak. The news piece showed how bribes can manipulate the proceedings of the Indian parliament.

== Undercover investigative journalism ==
=== Operation Duryodhana: money for parliamentary procedures ===
In 2005, along with Aaj Tak, Cobrapost conducted a sting operation that exposed eleven members (MPs) – ten from the Lok Sabha and one from the Rajya Sabha – accepting money for tabling their questions in the Parliament of India. The MPs allegedly accepted between ₹15,000 (US$160) and ₹110,000 (US$1,100) as bribes. This investigation led to expulsion of eleven MPs from the Parliament, the largest expulsion of MPs in the country's history. The eleven MPs expelled in December 2005, after Cobrapost's sting report, were from four political parties: seven from the Bharatiya Janata Party, two from the Bahujan Samaj Party, one from the Rashtriya Janata Dal and one from the Indian National Congress.

In 2007, a Rajya Sabha committee headed by Congress party leader Karan Singh stated that Cobrapost abetted corruption by offering a murky deal to the members of parliament. It filed a criminal complaint (FIR) against Cobrapost and Aaj Tak for the "offence of abetment as defined under Section 12 of the Prevention of Corruption Act 1988 by carrying out Operation Duryodhan and telecasting the same", according to The Times of India.

=== Purchase of Rajya Sabha seat ===
In a 2010 sting operation conducted in association with the IBN group, Cobrapost alleged that Kanwar Deep Singh was elected to India's Rajya Sabha from Jharkhand after he bought the votes of the state's members of legislative assembly (MLAs). According to The Times of India, the IBN-Cobrapost exposé allegedly showed MLAs from the Congress party, the Bharatiya Janata Party, and the Jharkhand Mukti Morcha asking for bribes "to the tune of ₹1 crore (US$100,000) from middlemen in exchange for their votes in favor of a Rajya Sabha candidate". The Jharkhand Mukti Morcha dismissed the allegations in the Cobrapost report because it lacked any credibility.

=== Operation Red Spider: black money laundering ===
In March 2013, Cobrapost alleged that three banks in India – HDFC, ICICI and Axis – were involved in money laundering, using false accounts to convert black money into white.

In an undercover operation it called Operation Red Spider, Cobrapost stated that it had secretly recorded several videotapes to uncover corrupt practices at the three banks, after its staff posed as a minister's aide. According to The Hindu, while it cannot vouch that the Cobrapost videotapes were authentic, the tapes show that the employees of these three banks were offering to convert black money into white. Each of the three banks issued a press statement that denied the allegations and offered their cooperation in any investigation, according to The Hindu newspaper. After Cobrapost allegations were made public, the Indian Finance Minister P. Chidambaram stated that he had talked with the chairmen of two of three banks and his office "wasn't jumping to any conclusions".

According to Cobrapost, the staff at the three Banks offered to use forged Pan Cards and multiple accounts for their clients to launder money. It added that the banks offer their clients to use their bank lockers to store cash and "maintain fictitious accounts for seven years saying that all details vanish after this period."

The undercover operation alleged that the education minister Sake Sailijanath of the Indian National Congress party government in Andhra Pradesh was willing to guarantee a ₹25 crore (US$2.6 million) hawala transaction. Sailijanath, according to The Economic Times, admitted that "he just put in a word to the bank officials" to help his friend needing a loan. On 15 March 2013, the ICICI Bank suspended 18 employees. On 16 March 2013 HDFC Bank authorised Deloitte Touche Tohmatsu to undertake an autonomous forensic probe of bank employees assisting customers to circumvent income tax.

The deputy governor of RBI, Chakrabarty, in a statement on 21 March 2014, denied Cobrapost allegations and stated that not a single corrupt black money transaction actually happened at the accused banks. He added that "there is no scam that has happened, as no transaction has taken place. Let us not necessarily downgrade ourselves. Our system to prevent money laundering is perfect, absolutely nothing (wrong with it)". According to the Firstpost news website, Cobrapost "slammed the Reserve Bank of India" for giving a clean chit to the corrupt banks it had named.

In May 2013, Cobrapost expanded its allegations to include twelve state-owned banking institutions such as the State Bank of India, Bank Of Baroda, Punjab National Bank, Canara Bank, Indian Bank, IDBI, Indian Overseas Bank, Dena Bank, Corporation Bank, Allahabad Bank, Orient Bank of Commerce and Central Bank of India. It also alleged that seven private sector banks in India were also complicit in black money operations, namely Yes Bank, Dhanlaxmi Bank, Federal Bank, DCB Bank, ICICI Bank, HDFC Bank and Axis Bank. Cobrapost further alleged that four major Insurance companies in India were active in black money operations, including the LIC, Reliance Life, Birla Life and the Tata AIG joint venture.

The Reserve Bank of India (RBI) launched a detailed audit and investigation after the Cobrapost allegations. It scrutinized the books of accounts, the compliance and internal control procedures, and the operations at the accused companies. In June 2013, the RBI issued a statement that it found "no evidence of money laundering" but added that "any conclusive inference in this regard can be drawn only by an end-to-end investigation of the transactions by tax and enforcement agencies". The RBI found the three banks to be guilty of violating the RBI-required "Know Your Customer" norms, and fined each bank a sum between 1 crore and 5 crore rupees. In July 2013, the RBI fined twenty-two additional banks in India for the same violations, and issued cautionary letters to seven other banks including Citibank, Standard Chartered and Barclays where it did not find any violations.

=== The Stalkers ===
In November 2013, Cobrapost along with the website Gulail claimed in tapes titled The Stalkers that in 2009, then Home Minister of Gujarat, Amit Shah ordered an illegal snooping operation on a woman, at the behest of their saheb (transl. boss). The Indian National Congress alleged that the saheb was Narendra Modi, the then Chief minister of Gujarat.

Audio tapes revealed conversations between Amit Shah and IPS GL Singhal, ordering Singhal's team to surveil a young woman architect from Bangalore due to instructions from saheb. The police followed her inside malls, restaurants, gyms, and tracked her scheduled flights, hotel bookings, and visits to her mother at a hospital. The team was also asked to surveil IAS Pradeep Sharma, who knew about the relationship between Modi and the woman.

In May 2016, the woman told the Supreme Court that she was "thankful" that the Gujarat police was assigned to tail her, and urged the judges to block investigations to determine whether the surveillance was legal and ordered by Modi, who had become India's Prime Minister in 2014.

IAS Pradeep Sharma was suspended and arrested in 2016, under various cases of money laundering and corruption pertaining to past service tenure.

=== Operation Blue Virus ===
In December 2013, Cobrapost accused many IT companies of misusing social media to help politicians with fake "likes" and "followers" to improve their popularity. Cobrapost alleged that its associate editor Syed Masroor Hasan approached two dozen professional IT companies and they offered help in "reputation management" and to tarnish the reputations of political opponents. Of the two dozen sting operations it conducted in 2013, Cobrapost stated that the name of Gujarat chief minister "Narendra Modi cropped up in around 5 to 6" stings. According to Cobrapost, there was no guarantee that the same IT firms were working for one particular party only. Cobrapost claimed how the undercover investigation uncovered infraction of the Information Technology Act, 2000, the Representation of the People Act, 1951 and the Income Tax Act, 1961, actionable under several provisions of the Indian Penal Code.

=== Operation Falcon Claw ===
An undercover operation resulting in a video named Operation Falcon Claw showed that eleven MPs from different parties agreed to lobby for a fictitious foreign company, and also that MPs received money ranging from ₹50,000 (US$520) to ₹5,000,000 (US$52,000) for issuing recommendation letters.

=== Operation Janambhoomi ===
On 3 April 2014, Cobrapost published on their website about their investigation, Operation Janambhoomi, into the conspiracy behind the demolition of the Babri Masjid, in which they bring to light the conspiracy behind the events of 6 December 1992, which rewrote the history of modern India on communal lines.

=== Operation 136: paid news ===
In March 2018, Cobrapost.com alleged that its undercover operation had uncovered the widespread continuing practice of journalistic corruption through paid news in India. The allegations charged that numerous major Indian media groups were willing to accept money to plug polarizing Hindu nationalism ideas as news in exchange for money. In its sting operation, Cobrapost stated that it approached the Times Group – the publisher of The Times of India, the India Today group, the Hindustan Times group, the Zee group, the New Indian Express group and other media houses – where it offered a payment of up to ₹500 crore (US$52 million) in cash to publish stories on Krishna and the Bhagavad Gita to first indirectly and later directly promote Hindutva ideology, communal and political gains. All three media houses agreed to the offer to plug paid news, alleged Cobrapost, but mentioned that they may editorially criticize the activities. The groups discussed ways to make large cash payments, alleged Cobrapost.

According to Cobrapost, the owners, as well as the senior executives, of major Indian media houses consented to engage in campaigns to induce communal discord and polarize the Indian electorate. The twenty seven media houses and organizations alleged to be corrupt by Cobrapost included the Times Group, Lokmat, Radio One, Suvarna News, Indigo 91.9FM, Bharat Samachar, Swaraj Express News, Sun Group, ABN Andhrajyothi, TV5 News, Dinamalar, Big FM, K News, India Voice, MVTV News, Open Media Network and others. The Cobrapost sting alleged, reports The Indian Express, that senior executives involved in paid news included Kalli Purie, Vinnet Jain, Ajay Shekhar Sharma, Brijesh Mishra, Anil Dua, Purushottam Vaishnava, Rajiv Hegde from various major media groups in India. According to Cobrapost, the Bartaman Patrika and Dainik Sambad declined to distribute advertisement with religious overtones.

After the release of the Cobrapost.com sting report on "paid news", the Times Group in a 26 May 2018 response called the report as "false, malicious, dishonest", a manufactured "fictitious scandal" presented with doctored quotes, and that the allegations do not reflect what actually happened. The Times Group alleged that its journalists were involved in a sting on the Cobrapost team to uncover "imposters" and "criminals on bail with a past record of fraud and forgery" they suspected were posing as businessmen and organization trying to push a political ideology. No cash or payment was ever exchanged during this operation to or from Cobrapost, stated the Times Group. The India Group similarly denied Cobrapost claims, stated that its editorial team never met the Cobrapost personnel, its advertisement group listens to all those who approach them, they condemn paid news, and consider Cobrapost's claim of paid news at India Today to be malicious. The Suvarna News group with a regional presence in south India stated that Cobrapost maliciously altered the recordings and that its allegations are baseless. It further stated that they had alerted the state police officials of Cobrapost staff when he first contacted them to publish religious content.

The New Indian Express Group denied the Cobrapost allegations, stated that they only met with the advertisement team who never promised "news" coverage and only discussed "advertisements", and alleged that their report had "conveniently buried" the cautionary statements about "legal vetting", checks and approval told to Cobrapost. The Zee group similarly stated that the Cobrapost report presents a "deliberate and fraudulent misinterpretation and concoction of actual facts", by "craftily editing the video clips, the essence of the conversation has been distorted in a manner that the truth is compromised and a different issue is portrayed in order to harm and hurt the reputation of Zee Media". In June 2018, Cobrapost denied Zee's statements and alleged that it "has not falsified, fabricated, concocted, tampered, doctored or altered in any manner whatsoever".

According to Cobrapost, it did not finance the sting operations, an independent reporter Pushp Sharma self-financed the cost of meeting and secretly recording the owners and senior executives of 27 media houses in India. Once Sharma approached Cobrapost, it purchased the work product from Sharma. Cobrapost's founder Aniruddha Bahal admitted that the sting operations never made any payment to any media group or executive, and the tapes were "all about showing intent".

=== DHFL allegations ===
In a press conference on 29 January 2019, Cobrapost alleged that the Indian mortgage lender Dewan Housing Finance Corporation (DHFL) promoters "siphoned off about ₹31,000 crore (US$3.2 billion) through a network of shell companies". The company called the allegations as "mischievous". On 6 March 2019, according to the Business Standard, an independent chartered accountant firm investigated these allegations and disputed the Cobrapost report. According to the audit completed by the firm, DHFL has "not promoted any of the 26 shell companies" that Cobrapost alleged. It further stated that the companies alleged to be involved in the fraud by Cobrapost "do not have any directors in common" and "DHFL or its promoters do not have any shareholding in these companies" as claimed. The auditors disagreed with Cobrapost allegations, but found that the DHFL executives failed to follow their standard operating procedures and inadequately monitored its borrowers.
