= Press release =

Information provided for public relations

An example of a press release. This is a template for Wikipedia press releases from the Wikimedia Foundation communications team.

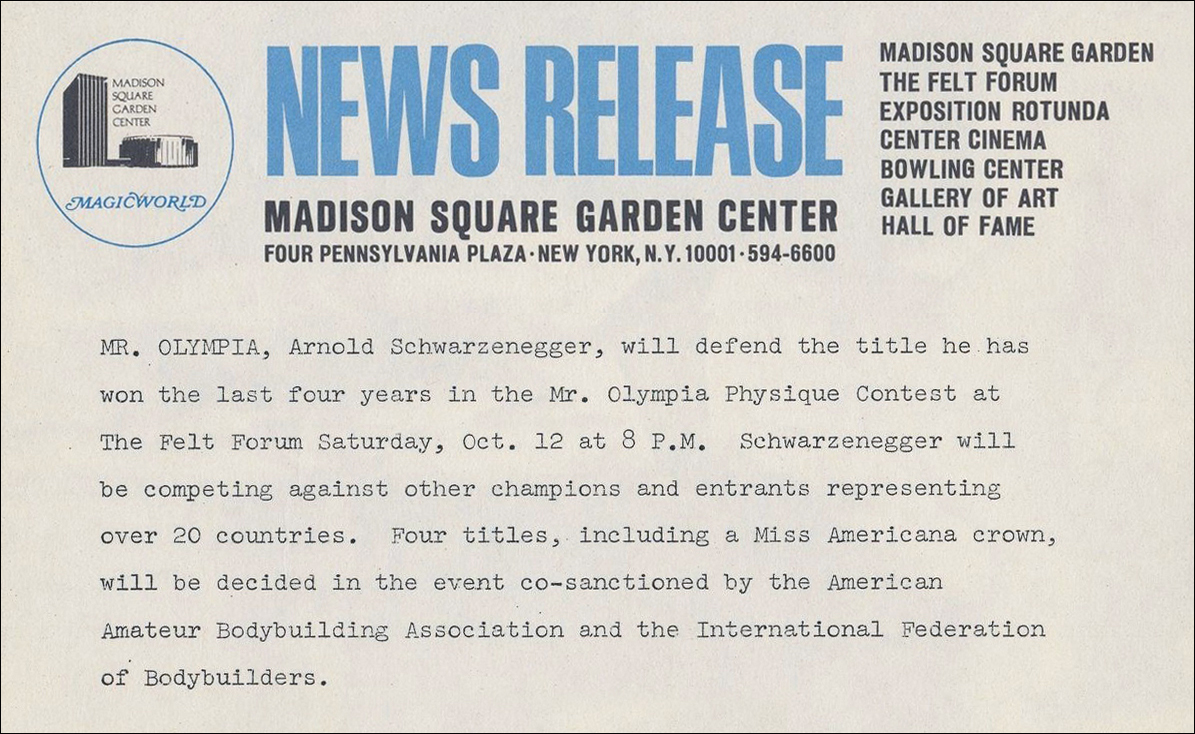
Madison Square Garden News Release 1974

A press release (also known as a media release) is an official statement delivered to members of the news media for the purpose of providing new information, creating an official statement, or making an announcement directed for public release. Press releases are also considered a primary source, meaning they are original informants for information. A press release is traditionally composed of nine structural elements, including a headline, dateline, introduction, body, and other components. Press releases are typically delivered to news media electronically, ready to use, and sometimes subject to "do not use before" time, known as a news embargo.

A special example of a press release is a communiqué (/kəˈmjuːnɪkeɪ/; French: [kɔmynike]), which is a brief report or statement released by a public agency. A communiqué is typically issued after a high-level meeting of international leaders.

Using press releases can benefit media corporations because they can contribute to reducing costs and improve the amount of material a media firm can output in a certain amount of time. Due to the material being pre-packaged, press releases save journalists time, not only in writing a story, but also the time and money it would have taken to capture the news firsthand.

Although using a press release can save a news outlet time and money, it constrains the format and style of its content. In addition, press releases can be favorable towards the organization that commissioned or issued them, framing the topic according to its preferred criteria. In the digital age, consumers generally want to receive information instantly, bringing about pressure on the news media to output information fast with less time for editing and fact-checking. This may cause news media companies to heavily rely on press releases to create stories.

== Elements ==
Any information deliberately sent to a reporter or media source is considered a press release. This information is released by the act of being sent to the media. Press release professionals often follow a standard professional format for press releases. Additional communication methods that journalists employ include pitch letters and media advisories. Generally, a press release body consists of four to five paragraphs with a word limit ranging from 400 to 500. However, press release length varies and can range from 300 to 800 words.

Common structural elements include:

- Letterhead or Logo
- Media Contact Information – name, phone number, email address, mailing address, or other contact information for the public relation (PR) or other media relations contact person.
- Headline – used to grab the attention of journalists and briefly summarize the news in one to six words.
- Dek – a sub-headline that describes the headline in more detail.
- Dateline – contains the release date and usually the originating city of the press release. If the date listed is after the date that the information was actually sent to the media, then the sender is requesting a news embargo.
- Introduction – first paragraph in a press release, that generally gives basic answers to the questions of who, what, when, where and why.
- Body – further explanation, statistics, background, or other details relevant to the news.
- Boilerplate – generally a short "about" section, providing independent background on the issuing company, organization, or individual.
- Close – in North America, traditionally the symbol "-30-" appears after the boilerplate or body and before the media contact information, indicating to media that the release has ended. A more modern equivalent has been the "###" symbol. In other countries, other means of indicating the end of the release may be used, such as the text "ends".

As the Internet has assumed growing prominence in the 24-hour news cycle, press release writing styles have evolved. Editors of online newsletters, for instance, often lack the staff to convert traditional press release prose into the print-ready copy.

== Distribution models ==
In the traditional distribution model, the business, political campaign, or other entity releasing information to the media hires a publicity agency to write and distribute written information to the newswires. The newswire then scatters the information as it is received or as investigated by a journalist. Thus, resulting in the information or announcement becoming public knowledge.

An alternative model is the self-distributed press release. In this approach, press releases are either sent directly to the media or sent via free and paid distribution services. Distribution services often provide localised, pre-made media contact lists which can be used during distribution. The distribution service then provides the content, as-is, to the selected media outlets for publication via email and online channels. This approach is often used by SME's, political institutions, governments and more. Another instance would be, Constitutional Courts in Europe, U.S. Supreme Court, and the U.S. State Supreme Courts issue press releases about their own decisions and the news media use these self-published releases for their reporting.

In Australia, Medianet was the first local company to provide such a service and has since expanded to include an Australian Media Contacts Database, Media Release Distribution and Media Monitoring within their platform.

=== Video ===
Some public relations firms send out video news releases (VNRs) which are pre-taped video programs or clips that can be aired intact by TV stations.

Video news releases may include interviews of movie-stars. These interviews, which have been taped on a set, are located at the movie studio and decorated with the movie's logo.

Video news releases can be in the form of full-blown productions as well. This costs tens of thousands or even hundreds of thousands of dollars to be produced. Video news releases can also be in the format of TV news, or even produced specifically for the web.

Some broadcast news outlets have discouraged the use of video news releases because of citing a poor public perception. It could also be viewed as a desire to increase their credibility.

Furthermore, VNRs can be turned into podcasts and then posted onto newswires. A story can also be kept running longer by simply engaging "community websites". "Community websites" are monitored and commented on by many journalists and feature writers.

== Embargoes ==
If a (draft or final) press release is distributed in an authorized way before the information is intended to be released to the public it is typically subject to an embargo against publication. An embargo requests that news organizations not report the story until a specified date or time.

Unless the journalist has signed a legally binding non-disclosure agreement agreeing to honor the embargo in advance, the journalist has no legal obligation to withhold the information. However, violating the embargo risks damaging their relationship with the issuing organization and their reputation as a writer or journalist. News organizations are sometimes blacklisted after breaking an embargo. Publicists are often encouraged to only share embargoed information with journalists they have an established relationship with and/or are willing to commit to withholding the information until a predesignated time.

== History ==
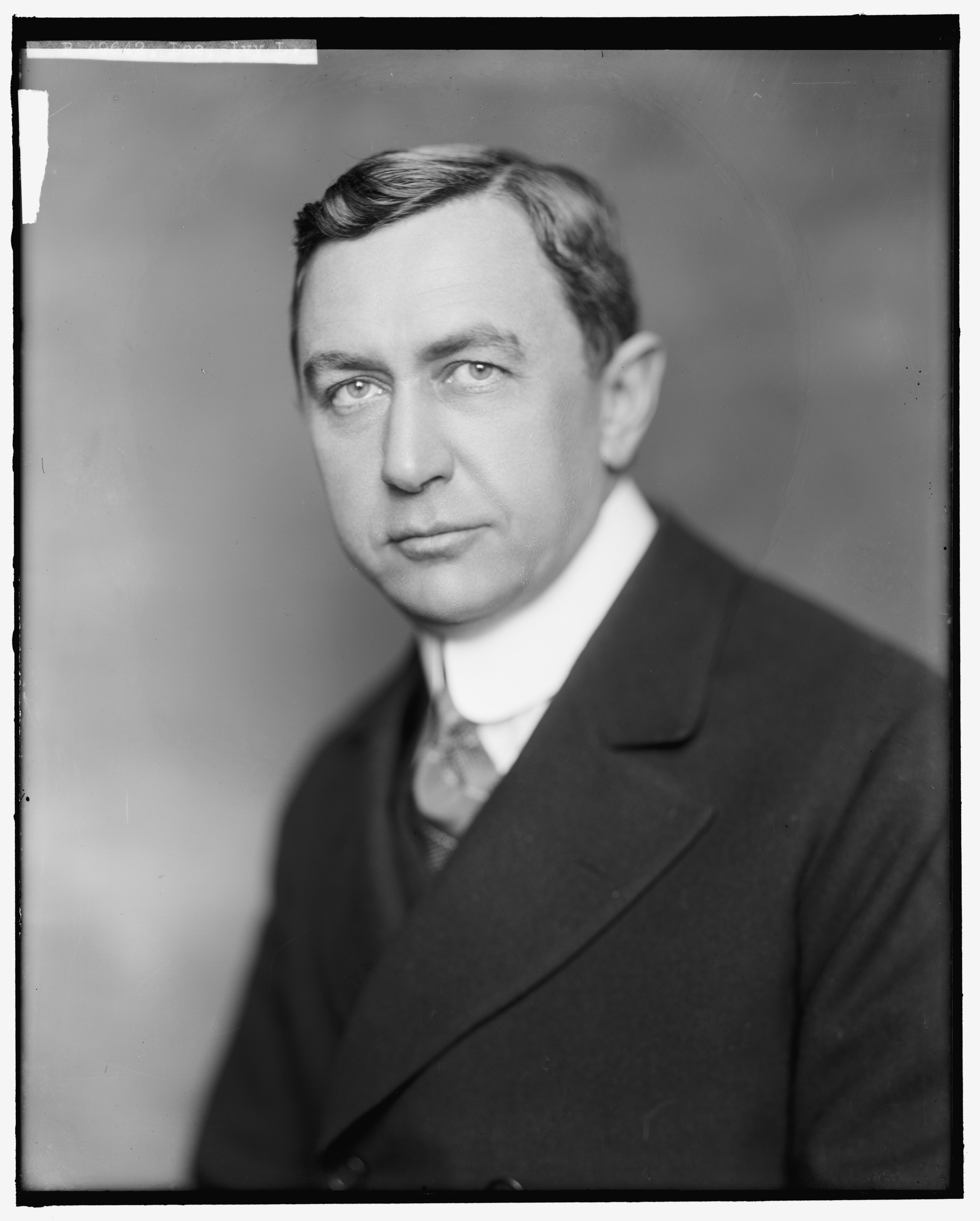
Ivy Lee, 1905

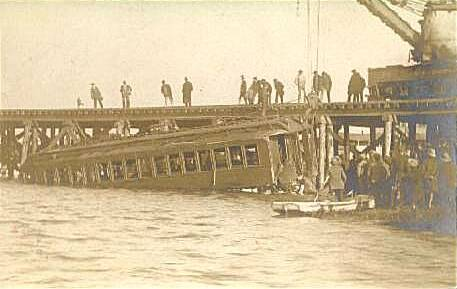
Atlantic City Train Wreck, 1906. The first event that created a press release. The release was done by Ivy Lee.

Ivy Lee, known as the father of modern public relations, made the first press release in October 1906 about a railroad accident involving the Pennsylvania Railroad. The accident caused the death of fifty people in Atlantic City, New Jersey (known as the Atlantic City train wreck). Lee documented the accident and gave out reports to fellow reporters. The biggest turning point was the honesty that Lee wrote regarding the accident and how truthful it was. The New York Times distributed his exact statement and observations.

Due to Lee's influence, press releases have evolved into a necessity for key details among companies to disclose to the public. Since then, press releases have been used to inform other journalists, PR's, and other media relation people of important events, statistics, and announcements.

== Other sources ==
- Churnalism – Journalism based on press releases and agency stories
- Electronic press kit – Set of promotional materials given to the media (EPK)
- List of press release agencies
- Mat release – Advertorial article associated with public relations and advertising
- News conference – Media event attended by journalists
- Spokesman – Speaking representative of an organization
- Press service – Management of public communication of organizations
- Science by press release – Aspect of science news
- Submission software
