= Bunker 13 =

Book by Aniruddha Bahal

- Title page for Bunker 13 (2003)
- Author: Aniruddha Bahal
- Publisher: Farrar, Straus and Giroux
- Publication date: June 2, 2003
- ISBN: 0-374-11730-6

Bunker 13: A Novel is a 2003 novel about an Indian journalist working on a weekly news magazine, who is investigating reports of corruption in some rogue outfits in the Indian army in the Kashmir sector. Drugs, sex and espionage are the central themes and is the first novel by Aniruddha Bahal. It achieved international attention and positive reviews.

The first edition was published June 2, 2003, by Farrar, Straus and Giroux (ISBN 0374117306). It received the Bad Sex in Fiction Award from Literary Review magazine.
