= Paid news in India =

Payment for positive media coverage

An advertorial, also known as paid news, is the practice of cash payment or its equivalent to journalists and media organizations by individuals and organizations in order to appear in their news articles and to "ensure sustained positive coverage". In India, paid news emerged as a widespread organized activity in India in 1990s through formal contracts and "private treaties". Pioneered by Bennett, Coleman & Company, Ltd. (B.C.C.L.) group through their Times of India publication, and widely adopted by groups such as The Hindustan Times, Outlook and others, the practice was brought to attention by a 2010 buried investigative report of the Press Council of India on paid news financially benefiting "individual journalists and specific media organizations" such as newspapers, magazines and television channels. The scandal implicated major newspapers and brought western media attention.

It is paid for by politicians, organizations (for profit and non-profit), brands, movies and celebrities who seek to improve their public image, increase favorable coverage and suppress unfavorable information.

The widespread "paid news" practice in India has been criticized because it diverts the coverage to whoever is willing to pay and selectively presents information that makes the paying customer appear in a favorable light, instead of presenting everything that is significant and necessary for the public to obtain a complete understanding. The information which needs to be delivered to the audience is somehow changed. Paid news corrupts the information and deceives the newspaper-magazine reader or the television audience, particularly given the Indian practice of "not making it clear that the news item has been paid for", state James Painter and John Lloyd.

== Press Council of India ==
The Press Council of India – the official Indian watchdog on media ethics – conducted a limited study of the widespread practice of "paid news" in India in 2010. In a report issued in July 2010, it stated that "paid news" is a pervasive, structured and highly organized practice in Indian newspapers and other media outlets, where news space and favorable coverage is exchanged for money. It wrote, "paid news is a complex phenomenon and has acquired different forms over the last six decades [1950–2010]. It ranges from accepting gifts on various occasions, foreign and domestic junkets [trips], various monetary and non-monetary benefits, besides direct payment of money. Another form of paid news that has been brought to the notice of the Press Council of India by the Securities and Exchange Board of India (SEBI) is in the form of "private treaties" between media companies and corporate entities. Private treaty is a formal agreement between the media company and another non-media company in which the latter transfers certain shares of the company to the former in exchange for advertisement space and favorable coverage."

In recent years, corruption in the Indian media has gone way beyond the corruption of individual journalists and specific media organizations – from "planting" information and views in lieu of favours received in cash or kind, to more institutionalized and organized forms of corruption wherein newspapers and television channels receive funds for publishing or broadcasting information in favour of particular individuals, corporate entities, representatives of political parties and candidates contesting elections, that is sought to be disguised as "news".

— Paranjoy G Thakurta, Kalimekolan S Reddy, Press Council of India, April 2010

The 2010 investigation was limited to the 2009 elections by the Press Council of India. It found substantial evidence of corrupt practices and collusion between the Indian media, various politicians and political parties. It ruled that newspapers should not carry articles that report "enmity or hatred between people on the ground of religion, race, caste, community or language", refrain from critical statements on "personal character and conduct of a political candidate", refuse financial or indirect forms of compensation for political coverage among other voluntary guidelines.

The Council's detailed report on "paid news" was suppressed by the Press Council after its members voted to "not forward the detailed report on paid news prepared by the sub-committee" it had previously appointed. According to J Balaji, some of the members objected to the specific names of media organizations that were mentioned in the detailed 2010 report. A partial summary report was released by the Press Council of India instead, omitting the 71-page annexure of the original report. A majority of the Press Council of India membership consists of journalists and representatives of the media houses.

== Sponsors of paid news ==
=== Politicians sponsoring paid news ===
The Election Commission of India has detected hundreds of cases where politicians paid newspapers or TV channels to carry favorable reports.

- Ashok Chavan, a former chief minister of an Indian National Congress-led government in Maharashtra used campaign funds for paid news. He was questioned by the Election Commission of India in 2010. The Commission stated that "[t]he complaint against Mr. Chavan was that he arranged publication of news items, masquerading as advertisements, in newspapers praising him in the 2009 State Assembly elections and he had not properly accounted for the expenses in his election expenditure accounts. But he claimed that the newspapers on their own might have published complimentary stories on him." According to The Hindu, its 2009 investigation found evidence that "paid news" was used to benefit Chavan, because an identical word-for-word hagiographic article appeared in three different newspapers as news on the same day under different titles and authors.
- Narottam Mishra, a cabinet minister in a Bharatiya Janata Party-led government in Madhya Pradesh, was accused by the Election Commission of India, allegedly "failed to lodge his accounts of his election expenses in the manner prescribed by law" and was linked to 42 news items on him during the November 2008 state elections which "read more like election advertisements in favor of [him] alone rather than as news reports."
- In 2009, Bhupinder Singh Hooda – then the chief minister of Congress-led government of Haryana, acknowledged that he offered money to the newspapers in his state to stop printing unfavorable "paid news" he alleged was funded by his opposition, and to print favorable news and the "right picture" in his view. According to Anuradha Raman, the regional newspaper Punjab Kesri stated that they earned ₹10 crore (US$1.1 million) during the 2009 elections through "paid news" and the marketing of editorial space to politicians willing to pay for coverage, that they did this because all Indian media was doing this with "the so-called national English dailies who had their packages and were mopping up revenue. We could not have missed out on the opportunity."
- In 2009, according to an article by Anuradha Raman, Sandeep Dikshit – a Congress party member of parliament acknowledged paid news and stated he was surprised when approached by a Delhi-based television channel with "a package deal to cover Rahul Gandhi’s visit to the East Delhi constituency during the 2009 Lok Sabha elections" and the channel offered to "arrange the crowds" for Gandhi's visit for a fee. According to Dikshit, states Raman, "You watch your opponent misusing the media and you’re forced to part with the money. I won’t take names but everyone is involved".
- In 2009, Akhilesh Das – a politician belonging to the Bahujan Samaj Party, stated that "I don't blame my party if it pays for news in its favor, there is a general media bias against his party". Das alleged, states Anuradha Raman, that the Congress-party politician Raj Babbar graced the front pages of local newspapers, and "paid news" is a growing trend in Indian elections.
- In April 2009, on the day of the election in Varanasi, the Hindi edition of the Hindustan newspaper, published by The Hindustan Times group, carried a front-page article that deceptively looked like news. The article stated that there was a popular voter "wave in favor of the Congress party". The next day, after the voting was over, the newspaper admitted and printed an apology that it was not news, but a paid item.
- The politician P.K. Rama Rao of Loksatta party alleged that he paid ₹50,000 (US$530) for favorable state assembly time election time coverage to a representative of Eenadu – a newspaper in Andhra Pradesh and Telangana states of India. The Eenadu Group denied that it had accepted any money, states Thakurta in an article on Manufacturing News, but added in its response that "favorable coverage in the press and the capacity to spend big money in poll campaign became the sole eligibility on the basis of which political parties chose their candidates [...]".
- In October 2011, Umlesh Yadav became the first ever sitting Member of Legislative Assembly (MLA) to be disqualified for not declaring the expenditure incurred on advertising during her election campaign. Yadav, a member of Rashtriya Parivartan Dal, had been elected from Bisauli, Uttar Pradesh, in 2007. She was banned from contesting election for a period of three years by the Election Commission of India.

The Election Commission is reported to have identified more than 1,400 cases of paid news between 2009 and 2013, during which elections were held in 17 states of India. One person involved, Deepak Chaurasia, host of India News, is accused of being a promoter of paid news in India.

In a video Aam Aadmi Party leader Arvind Kejriwal was seen as playing the role of a part-time editor and advising the journalist on which part of the interview should be played up more.

=== Businesses and celebrities sponsoring paid news and 'private treaties' ===
Bennett, Coleman and Co. Ltd, which owns the Times of India, is reported to have asked celebrities and the wealthy to pay for favorable coverage. They have offered a "private treaty" agreement, which accepts an equity stake in a company in return for favorable coverage. The New York Times described "private treaties" as an example of the commodification of business news. A New Yorker article says that the Times of India "have been dismantling the wall between the newsroom and the sales department" with Times MediaNet.

Similar practices by other media companies came to light as Jindal Steel sued the media company Zee News for allegedly demanding advertisements so as not to telecast shows in relation to the Indian coal allocation scam.

An older report by media critic The Hoot identified how "private treaties" influence reporting. However, the CEO designate of Times private treaties, in an interview with MediaNama, justified the practices as "there are two currencies for advertising – cash and treaties".

The Hoot's report named several companies besides Sobha Developers and Pyramid Saimira (now defunct) that participated in Times private treaties: Birla Power Solutions Ltd, Deccan Aviation, Pantaloon, Provogue, Spice Mobiles Limited, Videocon Industries Ltd, Deccan Aviation, India Infoline, The Home Store, Amity Education, Paramount Airways, Future Group, Sahara One, Precept Pictures etc.

=== 2018 Cobrapost allegations ===
According to Cobrapost.com, in its 2018 undercover operation it approached the Times Group – the publisher of The Times of India, the India Today group, the Hindustan Times group, the Zee group, the New Indian Express group and other media houses – where it posed as a preacher of a fictitious organization named Srimad Bhagavad Gita Prachaar Samiti. It offered a payment of up to ₹500 crore (US$53 million) in cash to publish stories on Krishna and the Bhagavad Gita to first indirectly and later directly promote Hindutva ideology, communal and political gains. All three media houses agreed to the offer to plug paid news, alleged Cobrapost, but mentioned that they may editorially criticize the activities. The groups discussed ways to make large cash payments, alleged Cobrapost.

According to Cobrapost, the owners, as well as the senior executives, of these and other major Indian media houses consented to engage in campaigns to induce communal discord and polarize the Indian electorate. It alleged that the undercover sting show twenty-seven media houses and organizations in India were willing to plug "paid content". Its alleged list included leading newspapers, magazines and television outlets such as those of the Times of India group, India Today group, Hindustan Times group, Zee News group, Network 18 group, Star India, Paytm, Dainik Jagaran, New Indian Express group, Lokmat, Radio One, Suvarna News, Indigo 91.9FM, Bharat Samachar, Swaraj Express News, Sun Group, ABN Andhrajyothi, TV5 News, Dinamalar, Big FM, K News, India Voice, MVTV News, Open Media Network and others. The Cobrapost sting alleged, reports The Indian Express, that senior executives involved in paid news included Kalli Purie, Vineet Jain, Ajay Shekhar Sharma, Brijesh Mishra, Anil Dua, Purushottam Vaishnava, Rajiv Hegde from various major media groups in India.

According to Rajalakshmi, the Cobrapost 2018 sting operation neither led to any real cash payments nor actual publication of any paid news by any media group, but it "revealed the clear intent of the majority to go along with the proposals of the undercover reporter" by numerous media groups in India. Further, by promising a large payment for plugging content, the undercover reporter was "able to access top levels of management and had repeated audiences with some owner-editors", states Rajalakshmi.

After the release of the Cobrapost.com report on "paid news", the Times Group in a 26 May 2018 response called the report a "false, malicious, dishonest", manufactured "fictitious scandal" presented with doctored quotes, and that the allegations do not reflect what actually happened. The Times Group alleged that its journalists were involved in a sting on the Cobrapost.com team to uncover "imposters" and "criminals on bail with a past record of fraud and forgery" they suspected were posing as businessmen and organization trying to push a political ideology. No cash or payment was ever exchanged during this operation to or from Cobrapost.com, stated the Times Group. The India Group similarly denied Cobrapost.com claims, stated that its editorial team never met the Cobrapost.com personnel, its advertisement group listens to all those who approach them, they condemn paid news, and consider Cobrapost.com's claim of paid news at India Today to be malicious. These and other media groups responded that large advertisers get access to their senior management in the sales department, but there is a wall between the sales department and their journalists and editorial department. Further, they said, all advertisements are checked by their staff before its publication, but the actual content in an ad is decided by the paying client.

The New Indian Express Group denied the Cobrapost.com 2018 allegations, stated that they only met with the advertisement team who never promised "news" coverage and only discussed "advertisements", and alleged that their report had "conveniently buried" the cautionary statements about "legal vetting", checks and approval told to Cobrapost.com. The Zee group similarly stated that the Cobrapost.com report presents a "deliberate and fraudulent misinterpretation and concoction of actual facts", by "craftily editing the video clips, the essence of the conversation has been distorted in a manner that the truth is compromised and a different issue is portrayed in order to harm and hurt the reputation of Zee Media". In June 2018, Cobrapost.com denied Zee's statements and alleged that it "has not falsified, fabricated, concocted, tampered, doctored or altered in any manner whatsoever".

== Criticism of paid news ==
Author Chandrahas Choudhury wrote in 2011 that paid news "is rotting India's democracy." The Analytic Monthly Review states that paid news is a fraud on its readers and the public, a tax fraud, as well as improperly manipulates the financial and real estate market.

In 2010, a two-person panel of the Press Council of India investigated the phenomenon of paid news in India. This resulted in a detailed 72-page report citing names and instances where information that had been paid for had been passed off as genuine news. However, the Press council voted to not release the full report, and published a shorter watered down version of the report.

== See also ==
- Advertorials
- Press Council of India
