= Graham Diamond =

American novelist

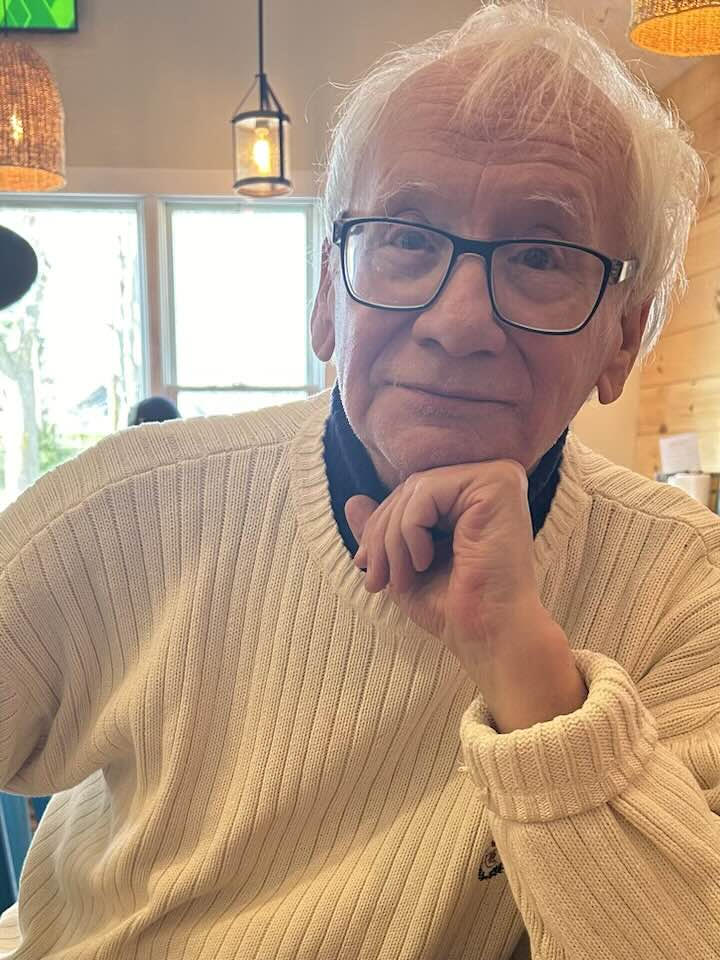
- Diamond in 2021
- Born: August 18, 1949 (age 77); Manchester, England
- Education: High School of Music & Art; City College of New York; Art Students League of New York; State University of New York
- Occupation: Author
- Children: 2
- Writing career
- Pen name: Rochelle Leslie
- Genres: Fantasy; science fiction
- Website: grahamdiamondwriter.com

Graham Diamond (born August 18, 1949) is an American author who writes across multiple genres, including fantasy and science fiction. He has published twenty novels with more than a million copies of his books in print.

== Life and education ==
Born in Manchester, England, his family moved to the United States when he was a young child. He was raised in New York City, on the Upper West Side, and graduated from the High School of Music and Art. He attended CCNY in NY, the Art Students League of New York, and the State University of New York.

During the early 1970s, he began working for The New York Times, becoming the weekend manager of the paper's editorial art department by the early 1980s. Diamond later became production manager, then assistant director of operations in the Editorial Art Department at the paper until leaving to pursue a full-time career in writing. He has also taught and lectured on creative writing in both New York and California.

Diamond has two daughters, Rochelle and Leslie. After spending more than a decade in California he returned to New York City.

== Literary career ==
Diamond began publishing novels in 1977, with the release of The Haven by Playboy Press. The Haven is a "besieged-enclave science-fantasy" in the same manner as The House on the Borderland by William Hope Hodgson and The Last Castle by Jack Vance. The book sold so well that his editors asked for a sequel, resulting in Lady of the Haven. This sequel was then segued into being the first volume of the four-book series Adventures of the Empire Princess.

In 1979, while the Haven-related books were still bring published, Diamond released The Thief of Kalimar, his first pure fantasy novel. By 1984 Diamond had published twelve books with more than a million copies sold around the world.

Diamond's other science fiction and fantasy works include Forest Wars, Marrakesh, Samarkand, and Samarkand Dawn. He also turned to other genres; including historical fiction, thrillers, and later a true story of a Holocaust survivor's family during World War II, Maybe You Will Survive. Several of his early novels were published in the UK by Methuen and much of his work by Endeavour Press and Venture Press in UK.

Under the pen name Rochelle Leslie (the names of his two daughters), he authored Tears of Passion, Tears of Shame, a novel of South Africa set during the Zulu War of 1879 which was subsequently published in Italy, titled, Venuto De Lontano, (To Come From Far Away) by Mondadori. In 2018 it was released as 'Cry For Freedom' by Lime books in the UK. He also has had various short stories published in anthologies.

Diamond released Chocolate Lenin in 2012. A satire/fantasy of near-future Russia, the novel parodied contemporary science, technology, and politics.

In 2013 it was announced that his first novel, The Haven, would be re-released in a new oversize format. In 2015 Venture Press Ltd, UK, a division of Endeavour Press UK, released in e-book format seven of Graham Diamond's earlier titles including The Haven, Samarkand, Samarkand Dawn, and Lady of the Haven.

In 2016, Endeavour Press published Black Midnight, a terrorist novel set in New York City, and Cry For Freedom, a novel set during the Zulu War in Natal in 1879. In early 2018 Endeavour next released Maybe You Will Survive the true story of a Holocaust survivor. Venture Press also re-released six of Diamond's speculative fiction/fantasy novels including The Thief of Kalimar, and Captain Sinbad.

Lume Books, London, issued a new print version of Maybe You Will Survive in 2020 to commemorate the 75th anniversary of the ending of the Holocaust. The following year The Haven, The Thief of Kalimar, Black Midnight, Forest Wars, Tears of Passion, Tears of Shame, Captain Sinbad and Chocolate Lenin were re-released in softcover in the United Kingdom.

In 2022, Diamond released Diner of Lost Souls, a mystery/thriller written in conjunction with Hedy Campeas and published by Lion Press. In June 2023 a second volume, Diner of Lost Souls, Book 2, was released.

== Critical reception ==
A Reader's Guide to Fantasy described Diamond's fiction as "adding a dash of imagination to subjects and themes common in fantasy and making them something unusual and original." Library Journal called his 1981 novel The Beast of Hades a "second-rate fantasy" but described Samarkand from the previous year as "an absorbing historical fantasy focusing on love and adventures.

The St. James Guide to Fantasy Writers described Diamond as having written "several undeservedly neglected novels. Apart from the generous Andre Norton, few took him seriously as a fantasy author—yet he is better than, or no worse than, some writers who are now dragonhold names. The Haven and its sequels, and Captain Sinbad, provide more than enough justification for wider popularity." 'The Haven' has remained in print for more than forty years.

== Select bibliography ==
=== Novels ===
- The Haven, Playboy Press (New York City), 1977.
- Lady of the Haven, Playboy Press, 1978.
- Dungeons of Kuba, Playboy Press, 1979.
- The Thief of Kalimar, Fawcett, 1979.
- Riverwild (Under pseudonym Rochelle Leslie), Berkley, 1979.
- Captain Sinbad, Fawcett, 1980.
- The Falcons of Eden, Playboy Press, 1980.
- Samarkand, Playboy Press, 1980.
- The Beasts of Hades, Playboy Press, 1981.
- Samarkand Dawn, Playboy Press, 1981.
- Marrakesh, Gold Medal, 1981.
- Marrakesh Nights, Gold Medal, 1984.
- Cinnabar, Gold Medal, 1985.
- Forest Wars, Lion Press, 1994.
- Chocolate Lenin, Lion Books, Venture Press, 2012.
- Black Midnight, Kensington/Zebra, Endeavour Press, UK, 2016.
- Tears of Passion, Tears of Shame, Berkley/Jove, Endeavour Press, UK, 2021.
- Diner of Lost Souls, Lion Press, 2022
- Diner of Lost Souls Book 2 became available in June 2023, Lion Press.

=== Nonfiction ===
- Maybe You Will Survive co-written with by Aron Goldfarb, Holocaust Press, 1991, reissued 2010, Endeavour Press 2018, then taken over by Luke Books, UK, in 2021.

=== Short fiction ===
- "Outcasts" in Habitats edited by Susan Shwartz, DAW Books, 1984.
