= Mat release =

Advertorial article associated with public relations and advertising

A mat release (also called a matte release) is a type of advertorial article associated with public relations and advertising.

The mat release is a short, feature story designed to appear like a newspaper article but contains persuasive communication in promotion of a product or idea. Mat releases are distributed gratis to smaller publications, such as community newspapers. Newspapers which run mat releases often do so to augment "soft content" sections of their publications, or to fill "news holes" due to staff shortages.

A mat release is different from a press release; the latter is a communications device targeted towards journalists. Mat releases, by contrast, are designed to target the public directly.
