= Shoma Chaudhury =

Indian journalist and editor

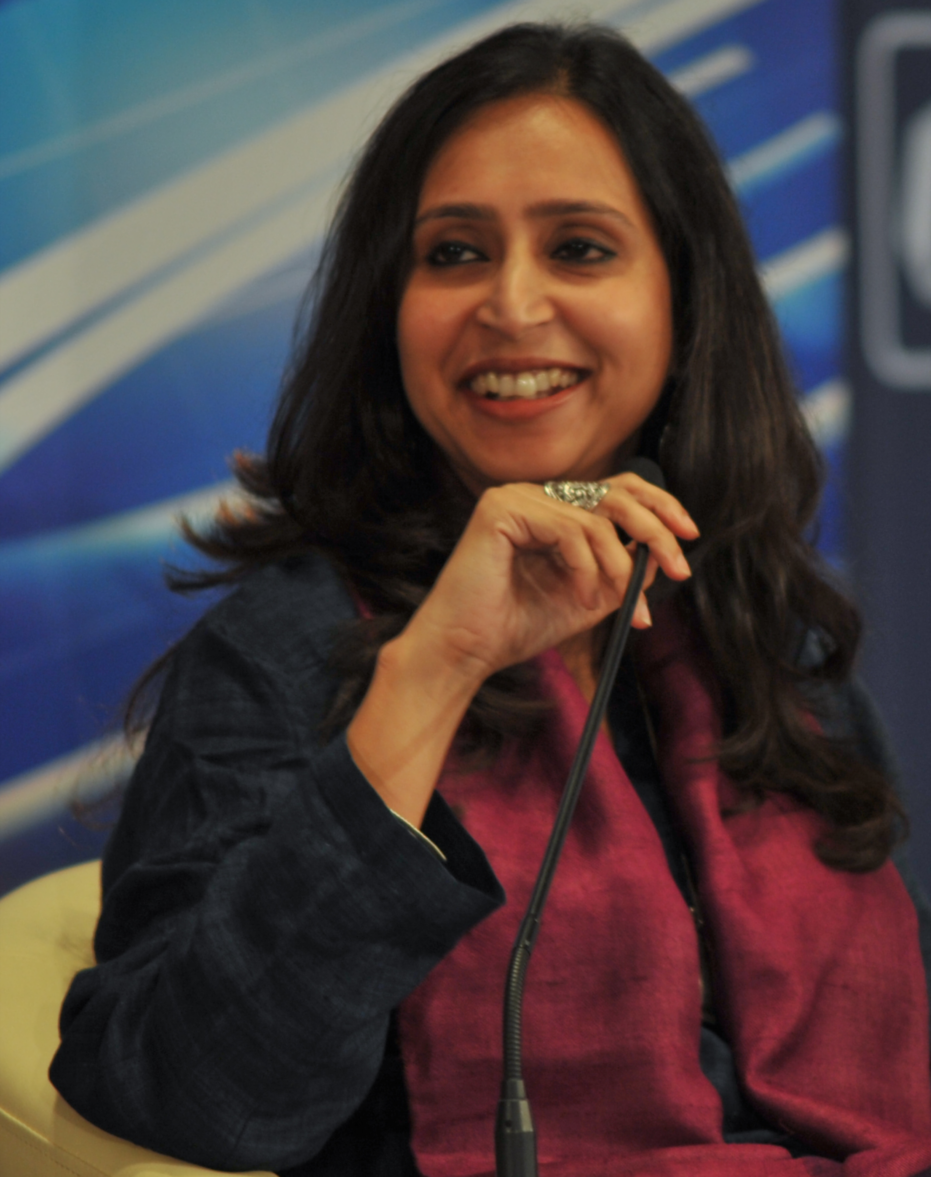
- Occupations: Journalistn editor, political commentator
- Website: shomachaudhury.com

Shoma Chaudhury is an Indian journalist, editor, and political commentator. She was managing editor and one of the founders of Tehelka, an investigative public interest newsmagazine. She also co-founded and was director of THiNK, an international conference of ideas, and Algebra, the Arts & Ideas Club, a platform for live conversations with prominent Indians. Chaudhury is the founder of Lucid Lines Productions, an intellectual properties company.

== Body of work ==
Chaudhury has reported extensively on issues of justice, social equity, human rights, environment, the media, law, and the fight over resources. She built a reputation for in-depth ground reportage, incisive commentary, portraits and interviews across disciplines. Several of her stories, in defence of human rights workers and others falsely accused by the State, were instrumental in getting people out of jail.

== Algebra conversations ==
Algebra – the Arts and Ideas Club was started by Chaudhury in September 2016. Since then, it has hosted myriad conversations presenting mainstream public figures in new light or highlighting counter-narratives. This includes grassroot social transformers, dispossessed voices whoa are often ignored by the mainstream media, including sewage workers, farmers, tribals, environmental activists and Muslims falsely accused of terror.

== Controversies ==
In 2013, Shoma resigned from Tehelka following a controversy surrounding her handling of a sexual assault complaint by a colleague against the convicted Tehelka editor and founder, Tarun Tejpal. Chaudhury, who is a prominent voice on women issues, was criticised by the media and some colleagues for possibly underplaying the case at her own magazine.
