= The Month of the Leopard =

2002 novel by Matthew Lynn (pen name James Harland)

- Language: English
- Genre: Legal thriller
- Publisher: Simon & Schuster
- Publication date: July 1, 2002
- Pages: 352
- ISBN: 0-7432-3463-4

The Month of the Leopard is a book written by Matthew Lynn under the pen name James Harland.

== Plot summary ==
The Month of the Leopard tells the story of a man whose life falls apart when he discovers a horrifying link between his Estonian wife's mysterious disappearance and the powerful and complex Leopard Fund.

== Reception ==
Kirkus Reviews wrote, "Tension, pitifully lacking in the first two thirds of this grand adventure for MBAs, finally arrives, but nonbankers will probably have bailed out by then".

Publishers Weekly noted, "There are problems: flat characterizations, gratuitous violence, unconvincing motivation for Telmont and a too-hasty denouement. But the book is a page-turner for anyone interested in high-stakes financial shenanigans".
