= K D Singh Foundation =

Private Indian organization

- Founded: 2013
- Founder: K D Singh
- Type: Private foundation
- Purpose: Women's empowerment, Education, and Health
- Location: Gurgaon, Haryana, India
- Region served: Global

KD Singh Foundation is a private Indian foundation supporting women empowerment, education, and health. It was established in March 2013 by K. D. Singh, Member of Parliament, Rajya Sabha.

== Organization ==
The foundation is headquartered in Gurgaon, Haryana.

It engages with survivors of sexual abuse to provide medical, legal and rehabilitation aid to enable them to seek justice and restore their life. The rape cell had provided aid to 113 rape victims across 17 districts in Haryana by November 2013.

The foundation is expanding its operations to include counselling for young men and women in rural Haryana, awareness workshops on maternal health, medical camps and other forms of educational and health related community initiatives.

== Projects ==
=== Support Cell for Rape Victims ===
The foundation established a Support Cell for Rape Victims that provides comprehensive support to rape survivors, including but not limited to Haryana. The foundation helps survivors legally, medically, financially and psychologically.

=== Youth Counselling Center ===
Falling levels of education coupled with no improvement in the number of dedicated centres for skill development leave many youth unemployed. The foundation offers youth counselling with an objective. The foundation collaborates with Khan Academy for providing easy and free education to underprivileged youth in Haryana.

=== Scholarships ===
KD Singh Scholarships are available for women students at Panjab University, Chandigarh. This scholarships are for students from less privileged backgrounds pursuing women studies, development studies or peace studies. The scholarship covers tuition fees through completion of the students' degree requirements.
