= Anne Smith (Scottish writer) =

Scottish academic, writer and editor (1944–2013)

Anne Glen Millar Smith
- Born: October 10, 1944; Leven, Fife
- Died: May 12, 2013 (aged 68); St Monans, Fife
- Education: University of Edinburgh
- Occupations: Academic, writer and editor
- Known for: Founding Literary Review

Anne Glen Millar Smith (October 10, 1944 – May 12, 2013) was a Scottish academic, writer and editor who founded the literary magazine Literary Review.

== Life ==
Born in 1944 in Leven, Fife, to Marion Cunningham and Norman Davidson Smith, Anne Smith studied at Buckhaven School before leaving to become a dental nurse.

Smith later returned to studying undertaking a PhD in English Literature at the University of Edinburgh, completing her dissertation The Novel of Factory Life, 1832–1855 in 1971. Smith remained in academia and in Edinburgh, being appointed as the Head of English at the university in 1979.

In 1979, amidst the Times Literary Supplement strike, Smith founded literary magazine Literary Review. In 1982 Smith moved, along with the magazine, to London, where the publication grew. Smith and the magazine eventually encountered financial difficulties, publisher Naim Attalah became a key backer of the magazine however removed Smith as editor, replacing her in 1986 with former Private Eye contributor Auberon Waugh.

Smith also wrote and published multiple fiction and non-fiction books, including the award winning The Magic Glass.

== Bibliography ==
- The Art of Emily Bronte (Vision Press, 1976)
- Lawrence and Women (Vision Press, 1978)
- The Magic Glass (Michael Joseph, 1981)
- Women Remember (Routledge, 1990)
