= Advertorial =

Advertisement disguised as editorial

An advertorial is an advertisement in the form of editorial content. The term "advertorial" is a blend) of the words "advertisement" and "editorial". Merriam-Webster dates the origin of the word to 1946.

In printed publications, the advertisement is usually written to resemble an objective article and designed to ostensibly look like a legitimate and independent news story. In television, the advertisement is similar to a short infomercial presentation of products or services. These can either be in the form of a television commercial or as a segment on a talk show or variety show. In radio, these can take the form of a radio commercial or a discussion between the announcer and representative. The concept of internet-based advertorials is linked to native advertising; however, whether the two terms are synonymous is contested.

Advertorials can be integrated with editorial content to bypass ad-blocking and enhance credibility and brand familiarity. Advertorials, especially those that are not clearly disclosed, are the subject of controversy in journalism ethics and marketing ethics. Researchers have found that they often mislead readers who are unaware of their origin, co-opting and damaging a publication's reputation. As many as two thirds of readers confuse advertorials for reporting, according to a 2016 study. Critical literacy enables individuals to evaluate commercial messages in marketing communications.

== Types ==
Advertorials can be classified into three types:

- Image advertorials: The organization running the advertisement wants to produce a favorable view of the organization or its products among the readers.
- Advocacy advertorials: The organization wants to explain their view of a controversial subject.
- Journalism advertorials: The organization wants to attract media attention to a subject or themselves. Their goal may be inspiring independently written stories about their area of interest, to get quoted in related stories, or to influence how journalists will write about a subject in the future.

== Publications ==
Advertorials differ from traditional advertisements in that they are designed to resemble the editorial content of the publication in which they appear. Most publications prohibit advertisements that are identical in appearance to their regular articles. However, the distinctions between advertorials and editorial content may be subtle. Disclaimers such as the word "advertisement" are sometimes included but are not always present. Alternative labels often used include "special promotional feature" or "special advertising section."

Advertorials can also be printed and presented as an entire newspaper section, inserted the same way within a newspaper as store fliers, comics sections, and other non-editorial content. These sections are usually printed on a smaller type of broadsheet and different newsprint than the actual paper, along with different fonts and column layouts. Many newspapers and magazines will assign staff writers or freelancers to write advertorials, usually without a byline credit. A major difference between regular editorial and advertorial is that clients usually have content approval of advertorials, a luxury usually not provided with regular editorial.

A related practice is the creation of material that looks like traditional media (for instance, a newspaper or magazine) but is actually created by a company to market its products. One familiar example is airline in-flight magazines, which may feature reports about travel destinations to which the airline flies.

In 1996, a UK based company called Parkway Publishing began publishing advertorials for advertisers. Parkway began enlisting clients and created PRPros to function as PR via advertorials with great success. The cottage industry is now widely used and considered very successful. Sheldon Schorr, the president of Parkway, was a leader in the crafting of advertorials and placed hundreds a year in scores of periodicals, especially magazines, utilizing quotes, brand references and trade enhancement, "meant to complement a company or persons' brand passively and more affordably than any other form of editorial content with much greater success than a press release". Historically, advertorials were less frowned upon and newspapers would even "show how magazine advertising is serving the public".

ExxonMobil purchased an advertorial positioned next to The New York Times op-ed page every Thursday between 1972 and 2001.

== Television ==
Advertorials on television are longer than typical television advertisements. They are usually played on cable and satellite channels, which are less expensive than broadcast television. They may include a plot or story line to increase the entertainment value for viewers, and thus hold their attention longer.

Daytime programs featuring light talk designed to draw in mainly a female audience often use advertorial segments which feature presentations of products, services, and packages by businesses. A representative of a business will have a discussion with a regular host, along with perhaps making a special offer for viewers.

=== Australia ===
In Australia, daytime programs featuring light talk and advertorials have been in television schedules since the late 1960s. One of the first was Good Morning Melbourne starring Roy Hampson and Annette Allison which began in 1967 followed by Good Morning Sydney in 1978, hosted by Maureen Duvall. Nine Network produced similar shows like In Sydney Today and In Melbourne Today, later merged into Ernie and Denise in 1994. They were followed by a national program which began in 1992 on Network Ten called Good Morning Australia (formerly The Morning Show) with Bert Newton. This success of that show prompted the Nine Network to launch a competing program in 2002 presented by Kerri-Anne Kennerley titled Mornings with Kerri-Anne, later shortened to Kerri-Anne. The Seven Network followed suit with a show starring Denise Drysdale called Denise before the debut of The Morning Show in 2007. Network Ten had 9am with David & Kim from 2006 which was replaced by The Circle in 2010. In November 2011, Nine Network cancelled Kerri Anne which was replaced by a new program titled 'Mornings' which premiered in 2012 presented by Sonia Kruger and David Campbell. It was later rebranded as Today Extra which meant the show was tied closer to Nine's breakfast news program Today.

These programs feature a traditional daytime show format of light talk, health, beauty, fashion and recipe segments along with advertorial segments scattered throughout the show. The advertorials are usually hosted by regular advertorial hosts who interact with business representatives. The main hosts of the show usually do not interact with the advertorial hosts or the business representatives. Advertorials are regulated under the Commercial Television Industry Code of Practice, which has been registered by the Australian Broadcasting Authority.

=== India ===
In India, the nexus between cable television companies, popular news papers and political parties came to the fore front in a 2011 documentary made by Prasar Bharati which revealed that the ownership of seven of the ten largest media companies in India was connected to some political party or the other. This was given further credence to reports on paid news that appeared in 2015-18 in selected Indian news papers and channels connecting the dark links between the two largest political parties BJP and Congress, black money and payments made to media channels to paint them in a better light. In 2018, a sting operation nicknamed "Cobrabost 136" by Cobrapost, an Indian investigative journalism agency showed videos of meetings held with the 15 largest media companies, who agreed to publish / telecast communally and politically motivated and misleading information as a campaign in return for payments, routed through advertising and PR companies.

=== United States ===
Advertorial-based daytime talk shows are common on some U.S. television stations, which similarly feature a mix of light talk and lifestyle-oriented segments targeting a female audience, as well as segments paid for by local businesses (usually consisting of an interview with a spokesperson). These programs are usually produced by a station's creative services department, with separation from their local news departments.

In the early-2000s, Daytime on Media General's WFLA-TV in Tampa Bay was scrutinized by the Federal Communications Commission (FCC) for not properly disclosing these sponsorships on-air, making them a form of payola; the station later agreed to disclose these segments on-air.

In a 2021 Last Week Tonight episode discussing paid content on local television stations, comedian John Oliver noted that some of these programs were lax in their vetting of advertisers, impacting the integrity of their parent stations by allowing them to present "enthusiastic, uncritical showcases" for "medically dubious" treatments and therapeutic devices (including a "shockwave" massager presented on KTVX's Good Things Utah that was promoted as a cure for cellulite and erectile dysfunction, but only approved by the FDA as a therapeutic device). To demonstrate his point, the program bought airtime on multiple advertorial shows—including Good Things Utah and KMGH-TV's Mile High Living—to air a segment promoting a fictitious product known as the "Venus Veil" (an ordinary blanket promoted as the "world's first sexual wellness blanket").

The satirical reality series Nathan for You similarly duped advertorial daytime shows as part of its episode "The Movement", where Nathan Fielder attempted to promote a titular workout fad involving the lifting of boxes (as part of an effort to provide free labor for a moving company). These efforts included paid appearances by bodybuilder Jack Garbarino—whom Fielder brought on as the "face" of "The Movement"—on advertorial shows such as KTNV-TV's The Morning Blend.

== Radio ==
On radio, advertorials can feature discussions between an announcer or a DJ and the representative of a business. The discussion may feature testimonials from customers or a personal endorsement from the announcer. The products featured can range from mobile phone/cable/satellite providers, insurance, financing, auto servicing, travel agencies, and upcoming concerts or music releases.

=== Australia ===
The "cash for comment affair" was an Australian scandal that broke in 1999, concerning paid advertising in radio that was presented to the audience in such a way as to sound like editorial commentary.

== Legal issues ==
In the United Kingdom, the Advertising Standards Authority requires advertorials to be clearly marked as such. In one case, the Scottish newspaper The Herald published a feature titled "Professional Brief" that had been submitted by Glasgow-based French Duncan Chartered Accountants. According to a complaint, it did not clearly indicate that it was a paid advertisement. The newspaper argued that, because it was a "sponsored column" and it was indicated that the opinions expressed were those of the author, it did not have to refer to it as an advertisement. The ASA responded that, because payment was given in exchange for the publication of the columns and because the content was provided by the marketers rather than the newspaper, they considered the columns advertisements and required that they indicate as much.

For magazines in the United States mailed at the publication rate, the Postal Service has regulations as to how to mark editorial and advertising. Domestic Mail Manual states that under 18 USC 1734, "if a valuable consideration is paid, accepted, or promised for the publication of any editorial or other reading matter in a Periodicals publication, that matter must be plainly marked 'advertisement' by the publisher. When a single item of paid editorial or other reading matter occupies more than one page, it need only be marked 'advertisement' on the first page. The word "advertisement" may be included in a statement that explains why the material is marked 'advertisement.' Such a statement must be prominent on the first page of the material and the word 'advertisement' in the statement must be in bold or italicized print or otherwise emphasized so that it can be plainly seen. Editors or publishers who print such matter without plainly marking it 'advertisement' are subject to a fine of not more than $500."

== See also ==
- Advertising supplement – Supplemental advertisement included with a publication
- Native advertising – Type of paid advertising
- Informative advertising – Advertising carried out in a factual manner
- Indian paid news scandal – Payment for positive media coverage
- Mat release – Advertorial article associated with public relations and advertising
- Sponsored post – Form of online promotion
