= The Alchemy of Desire =

2006 novel by Tarun Tejpal

- Author: Tarun Tejpal
- Language: English
- Genre: Novel
- Publisher: Ecco
- Publication date: December 26, 2006
- Publication place: India
- Media type: Print (Hardback & Paperback)
- Pages: 528 pp (first edition, hardback)
- ISBN: 978-0-06-088856-5 (first edition, hardback)
- OCLC: 76943734
- LC Class: PR9499.4.T44 A79 2005

The Alchemy of Desire is a 2006 novel by Tarun Tejpal. It was shortlisted for the Prix Femina and won France's Le Prix Mille Pages for Best Foreign Literary Fiction.
