= Wendy Perriam =

British novelist

Wendy Perriam is a British novelist, whose work often reflects her strict convent background, against which she rebelled sharply, and her stories contain much explicit sexual content. She has also appeared frequently on radio and TV.

== Career ==
Wendy Perriam is a British novelist and graduate of St Anne's College, Oxford, who started writing at the age of five and wrote her first novel at eleven. Perriam then went silent as she struggled through a long period of depression and physical illness, having been expelled from her Catholic school for heresy and told she was in Satan's power. Many of her early novels explore the perils and, conversely, the great attractions of Catholicism. Perriam's work is also renowned for its explicit sexual content.

In 2002, after being nominated for both two preceding prizes, she won Literary Review's Bad Sex in Fiction Award for Tread softly.

Perriam has appeared frequently on television and radio, and was once a regular contributor to the radio series Stop the Week and Fourth Column. She has also written for a wide variety of newspapers and magazines, and appeared at many leading literary festivals. Her work has been critically acclaimed for its psychological insight and for its power to disturb as well as divert. She was described by the Sunday Telegraph as "one of the most underrated writers in the country", and the Financial Times stated "her gift for humour has been likened to that of Kingsley Amis".

Her 16th novel, Broken Places, published in paperback in 2012, was shortlisted for 2011 'Mind Book of the Year' award. In January 2013, she was awarded an Honorary Doctorate for her "outstanding contribution to literature and reading pleasure", by Kingston University, which houses her archive.

== Personal life ==
Perriam has been twice married and has two stepchildren. Her own daughter - and only child, after two miscarriages - died of cancer in 2008. Perriam lives in London.

== Bibliography ==
=== Novels ===
- Absinthe for Elevenses (1980)
- Cuckoo (1981)
- After Purple (1982)
- Born of Woman (1983)
- The Stillness the Dancing (1985)
- Sin City (1987)
- Devils, for a Change (1989)
- Fifty-Minute Hour (1990)
- Bird Inside (1992)
- Michael, Michael (1993)
- Breaking and Entering (1994)
- Coupling (1996)
- Second Skin (1999)
- Lying (2001)
- Tread Softly (2002)
- Broken Places (2010)
- An Enormous Yes (2013)
- The Tender Murderer (2017)
- Sing for Life (2019)

=== Short Story Collections ===
- Dreams, Demons and Desire (2001)
- Virgin in the Gym (2004)
- Laughter Class (2006)
- The Biggest Female in the World (2007)
- Little Marvel (2008)
- The Queen's Margarine (2009)
- 'I'm on the train!' (2012)
- Bad Mothers Brilliant Lovers (2015)
