= Matthew Lynn =

British writer (born 1962)

Matthew Lynn (born 1962) is a British financial journalist, author and publisher. He writes for The Daily Telegraph, The Spectator and MoneyWeek, and has worked as a columnist for The Sunday Times and Bloomberg. He is also a thriller writer and author of the Death Force series of novels, having written under the name James Harland.

== Early life ==
Lynn was born in 1962 and grew up in Exeter and Dublin, before moving to London. He was educated at Emanuel School, London, and Balliol College, Oxford.

== Career ==
=== Journalism ===
Lynn worked as a journalist at Financial Adviser and at Asiaweek in Hong Kong before joining Business magazine. From 1991 to 2000, he worked for The Sunday Times as a business reporter and profile columnist.

From 1999 to 2011, Lynn was a columnist for Bloomberg News and a regular contributor to Bloomberg Television. He was also a columnist for Sunday Business. Since 2009, Lynn has written a weekly column in Money Week.

From 2011 to 2015, Lynn wrote the London Eye column for WSJ MarketWatch.

Lynn now writes business and economics columns for The Daily Telegraph. He is a regular contributor to The Spectator.

=== Economist ===
Lynn writes on business and economics, including columns in Bloomberg News, MoneyWeek and The Spectator. For most of the 1990s, he worked for The Sunday Times, for the last three years as a profile columnist.

His book Four Walls Eight Windows (ECON, 1997) was reviewed by Library Journal, which wrote, "Lynn's treatment of the political, industrial, and social turmoil surrounding the sale to major carriers of a stable of aircraft of various payloads and ranges has all the intrigue and skullduggery of a spy novel".

Lynn wrote two business books, The Billion-Dollar Battle: Merck v. Glaxo and Birds of Prey: Boeing v. Airbus. The latter received a review from Publishers Weekly, while Kirkus Reviews noted Lynn "writes serviceable prose at best".

In a 2007 Bloomberg article, Matt Lynn predicted that Apple Inc. "…will sell a few to its fans, but the iPhone won't make a long-term mark on the industry".

He is the author of Bust: Greece, the Euro and the Sovereign Debt Crisis, published in late 2010, and more recently, The Long Depression: The Slump of 2008 to 2031 (Endeavour Press). His articles and opinions have been used as references by other authors and researchers. Bust was reviewed in CHOICE: Current Reviews for Academic Libraries as follows: "books on economics and international finance rarely provide an exciting, gripping read".

In 2012, Lynn was chief executive of Strategy Economics, a London-based consultancy. His "London Eye" column began appearing weekly in MarketWatch in June 2011.

=== Author ===
Lynn is the author of many books, both fiction and non-fiction.

The Billion Dollar Battle (ISBN 074931026X) was an inside look at the pharmaceutical industry, published by William Heinemann in 1991.

Birds of Prey: Boeing vs Airbus was an inside look at the aerospace industry, published by William Heinemann in the UK and Four Walls, Eight Windows in the US.

His first novel ‘Insecurity’ (ISBN 9780749323233) was published by Random House in the UK in 1998, and republished by Joffe Books in 2025.

The Watchmen (ISBN 0749323280) was published by Random House in 2000, and republished by Joffe Books]in 2025.

The Month of the Leopard was published by Simon & Schuster in 2004, under the pen-name James Harland. It was republished by Joffe Books under the Matt Lynn name in 2025.

In 2009, Lynn started writing the ‘Death Force’ series for Headline, tracking the adventures of a group of mercenaries.

Death Force was published in 2009. Fire Force was published in 2010. Shadow Force was published in 2011. Ice Force was published in 2012.

'I was anticipating a good time and I wasn't disappointed. A cracking action thriller. You can taste the dust and smell the blood,’ wrote the Daily Express of the series. 'Matt Lynn's novel is up there with the finest that Andy McNab or Chris Ryan have ever penned' wrote the News of the World.

Lynn returned to non-fiction with the publication of ‘Bust: Greece, the Euro, and the Sovereign Debt Crisis’ published by Bloomberg Books in 2010.

As James Harland, he published The Month of the Leopard in 2001. Kirkus Reviews wrote, "Tension, pitifully lacking in the first two thirds of this grand adventure for MBAs, finally arrives, but nonbankers will probably have bailed out by then". Publishers Weekly noted, "There are problems: flat characterizations, gratuitous violence, unconvincing motivation for Telmont and a too-hasty denouement. But the book is a page-turner for anyone interested in high-stakes financial shenanigans."

He started writing the Death Force series of action-adventure thrillers in 2009. Featuring a group of mercenaries, the series includes Death Force, Fire Force and Shadow Force. The News of the World gave the first book a four-starred rating, describing it as "a Boy's-Own adventure guaranteed to get the pulse racing. It is up there with the finest that Andy McNab or Chris Ryan have ever penned."

=== Publisher ===
In 2018, Lynn set up Endeavour Media, an independent publisher based in London. It became Lume Books in 2020.

==== Controversy ====
When trying to promote his book The Watchmen, Lynn offered the first chapter for free on the website Motley Fool UK. However users on the website objected to his unusual method of publicity and Lynn had to back off.

== Personal life ==
He has three children.
