= Mathew Samuel =

Indian journalist

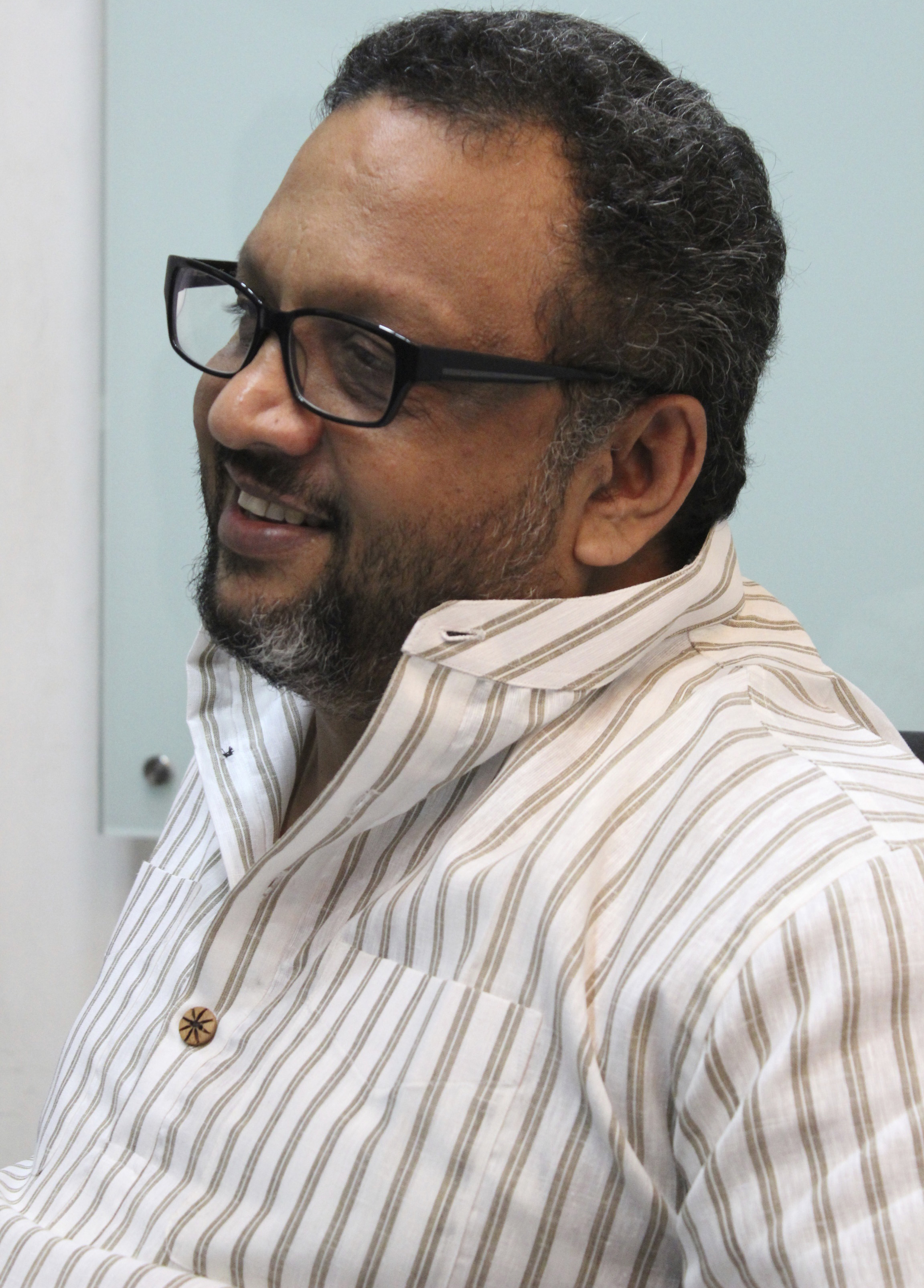
Samuel in 2013

Mathew Samuel is a former managing editor of the Indian news magazine Tehelka. He is one of the members of the magazine, and as a special correspondent there, he instigated Tehelka's biggest corruption investigation, Operation West End. This sting operation led to the resignation of four senior ministers of the National Democratic Alliance (NDA) and nearly brought down the BJP-led national government in 2001. The top politicians and officials caught in the sting were later convicted by the court of law. His YouTube channel was banned in India as on 9th May 2025.

== Career ==
Mathew Samuel was born in a Christian family in Pathanapuram, Kerala. He attended St. Stephens College Pathanapuram, was active in politics, and was the college union secretary. He worked in Delhi for Mangalam magazine and Mid-Day newspaper for a short period. He later joined Tehelka as a staff reporter, and became managing editor in 2014. He has also worked in Delhi for the publication India Today, and for television channels NewsX, Live India and India TV. He is based in New Delhi. He resigned from Tehelka in February 2016 to start his own news venture, Narada News.

== Operation West End ==
The sting was the brainchild of Mathew Samuel. He got the beginning of the story on a train journey in which one of his co-passengers turned out to be a supplier for Defence Canteens. The sting operation lasted for about eight months and revealed involvement of public figures in corruption. Samuel met with approximately 60 people, including arms dealers, and exposed corruption at high levels of power. The public figures involved were George Fernandes (Defence Minister), Bangaru Laxman (BJP president), Jaya Jaitly (president of the Samatha Party), R. K. Jain (treasurer of Samatha Party), R K Sharma (treasurer of RSS), General Manjith Singh Aluvalia, Major General P. S. K. Chowdhary, General R. K. Murge, General Satnam Singh, Brigadier Iqbal Singh, Colonel Anil Saigal, H. C. Panth, P. Sasi, and Surender Kumar Surekha, a Kanpur-based businessman.

On July 30, 2020, Special CBI Judge Virender Bhat sentenced former Samata Party president Jaya Jaitley, her former party colleague Gopal Pacherwal and Major General (rtd) S.P. Murgai to a 4-year jail term.

There were 105 videotapes. Samuel alone shot 99 tapes; the rest were shot with his colleague.

== Narada sting operations ==
Mathew Samuel is also credited for conducting the Narada sting operation and publishing it on the new website naradanews.com.
