= Tarun Tejpal =

Indian journalist

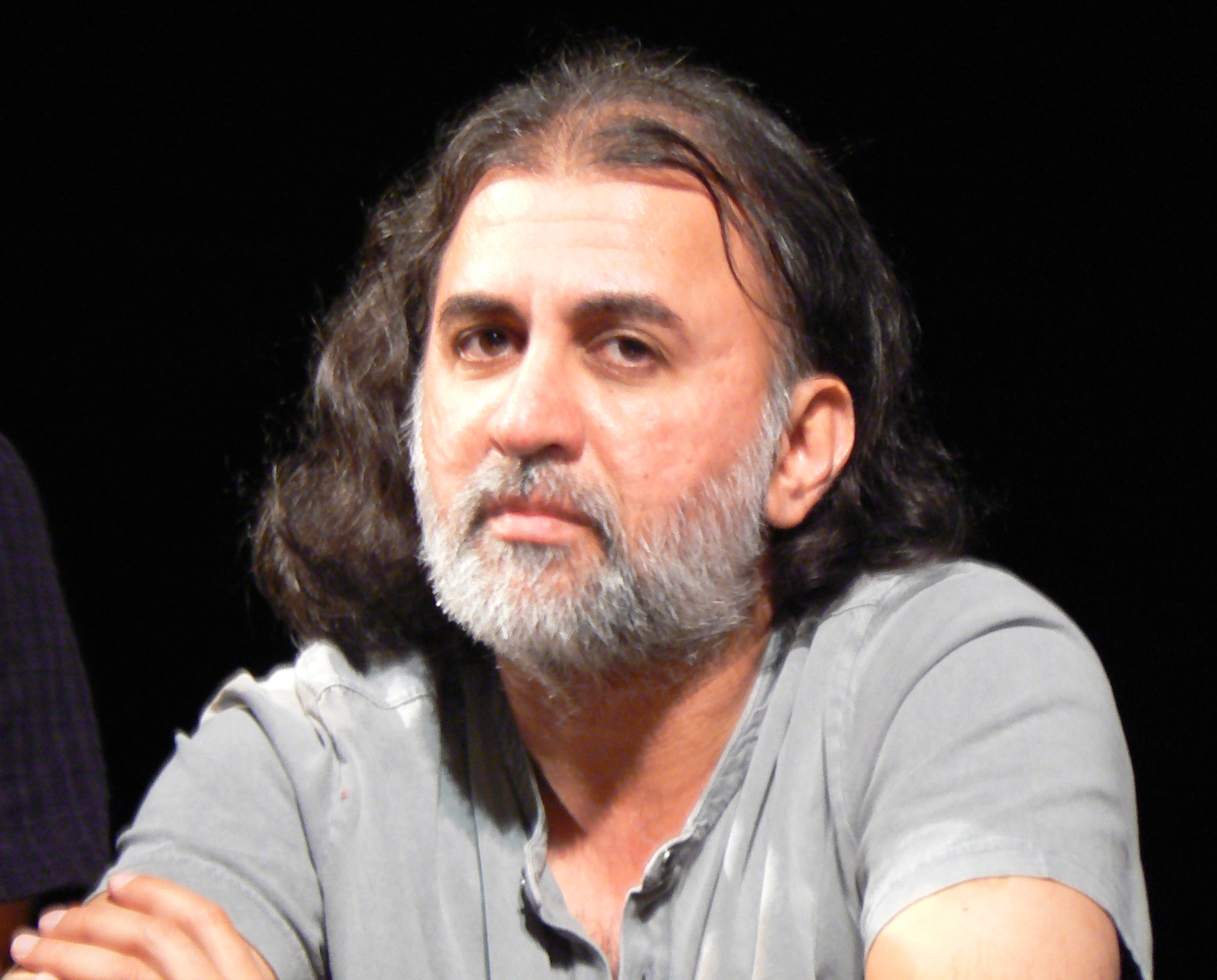
- Tejpal at la Fureur de lire 2007, Geneva, Switzerland
- Born: 15 March 1963 (age 63); New Delhi, India
- Occupations: Journalist, publisher, novelist, entrepreneur
- Known for: Founder of Tehelka
- Spouse: Geetan Batra
- Children: 2
- Relatives: Arjun Mathur (son-in-law)

Tarun Tejpal (born 15 March 1963) is a former Indian journalist, founder editor of Tehelka magazine.In August 2026 the Bombay High Court convicted him of rape and related sexual offences against a junior colleague in Goa in 2013 and sentenced him to ten years’ rigorous imprisonment.

== Early life ==
Tejpal's father was in the Indian Army, as a result of which he grew up in many parts of the country. He graduated in economics from Punjab University in Chandigarh. Tejpal married Geetan Batra in 1985. They have two daughters, Tiya and Cara.

== Career ==
In the 1980s he began his career with The Indian Express and later moved to New Delhi to join a now defunct magazine called "India 2000". In 1988, he joined India Today magazine, and then helped revamp The Financial Express in 1994.

From 1994 to 1996, Tejpal hosted a weekly literary show called 'Books and Ideas' on Doordarshan's cultural channel, DD3. The show featured a wide array of authors, historians, novelists, poets, and scholars.

Later he became a founding editor of Outlook, India's second largest newsmagazine publication.

Tejpal co-founded a publishing company, RST IndiaInk, which published Arundhati Roy's Booker Prize winning novel The God of Small Things in 1998.

In 2000, Tejpal set up India's first journalistic website, Tehelka. Tejpal in several media interviews declared the primary impulse of Tehelka would be editorial and not commercial, and it would aim to bring back the aggressive public interest journalism of the 1980s which had been misplaced in the fashion, food and cinema excitements of the 1990s. "Tehelka.com" did its first sting operation on India-South Africa cricket match fixing in 2000. A book about the exposé, Fallen Heroes, was published soon after. The Tehelka portal soon came to be known for its sting investigations, mainly for Operation West End (defence deal bribes). In 2004, "Tehelka.com" made a switch from online portal to print media when it was relaunched as Tehelka national weekly newspaper in tabloid format, which became a weekly magazine in January 2007. Tehelka's landmark stories include the Gujarat killings, Dr Binayak Sen, police encounters in the north-east, coal and 2G scams, the Ishrat Jahan and Tulsi Prajapati murders, the organising of riots by rump groups, an exposé on Zaheera Sheikh (witness of the Best Bakery case); as well as its persuasive reportage on the oppressed and disadvantaged sections of India – Dalits, tribals, poor and other minorities, victims of buccaneering development.

Tehelka's reporters and writers won every journalistic award – including three years of the Chameli Devi for the best national woman journalist of the year and two IPI (International Press Institute) awards for the best journalism of the year as well as the Sanskriti Journalism Award, Statesman Award for Rural Reporting, Ramnath Goenka Award for Northeast Reporting and multiple South Asia Laadli Media & Advertising Awards.

Tejpal created and spearheaded THiNK, a 3-day festival of ideas featuring global frontline thinkers in science, tech, politics, economics and the arts. It was held in Goa for three years from 2011 to 2013.[14] International celebrities who spoke at THiNK included Robert De Niro, V S Naipaul, Garry Kasparov, Erica Jong, James Randi, George Schaller, and Amitabh Bachchan.

== Conviction in rape case ==
In November 2013, during Tehelka’s THiNK festival in Goa, a junior colleague of his publication alleged through her resignation letter that Tejpal sexually assaulted her on 7 and 8 November. In her resignation letter to Shoma Chaudhury, she described the incident as a non-consensual sexual act, without using the word rape. At that time, Goa Police registered a first information report, was arrested and spent 6 months in jail before being granted bail by the Supreme Court in July 2014. Tejpal initially described the incident as "a lapse of judgement" but later denied the allegations and alleged that the case against him was part of a vendetta by the Bharatiya Janata Party government in Goa. On 21 May 2021, a Goa sessions court acquitted him of all charges. However, on 6 August 2026, the Goa Bench of the Bombay High Court overturned the 2021 acquittal and convicted him of aggravated rape under Sections 376(2)(f) and 376(2)(k) of the Indian Penal Code. The court applied post-February 2013 definition of rape provisions, which is not limited to penile-vaginal intercourse, and treats the offence as aggravated where the accused is in a position of trust or authority, or in a position of control or dominance over the complainant. This led the court to sentence him to 10 years of rigorous imprisonment, with the sentences to run concurrently. Tejpal has appealed to the Supreme Court of India, which has directed him to surrender before hearing his appeal.

== Literary works ==
Tejpal's debut novel The Alchemy of Desire (2006), won Le Prix Mille Pages for Best Foreign Literary Fiction. It was published in over 20 languages and went on to sell more than half-a-million copies. The book also gained substantial attention for the rare and powerful praise it garnered from Nobel laureate Sir V S Naipaul, who wrote "at last — a new and brilliantly original novel from India." Khushwant Singh in his review wrote, "The Alchemy of Desire puts Tarun Tejpal in the front rank of Indian novelists. I am inclined to agree with Naipaul: Tejpal has turned out a masterpiece. It is a novel that must be read." Writing of the book, Le Figaro said "This Indian masterpiece is like a voyage down the Ganges, long and infinitely pleasurable; the only thing that worries you is getting to the end too soon."

A foiled assassination bid on Tejpal in 2001, and the arrest of five contract killers became the seed of Tejpal's second literary novel, the critically acclaimed. The Story of My Assassins (2010) on which the 2020 web series Paatal Lok Season 1 on Amazon Prime is based. The Valley of Masks (2011) was longlisted for Man Asian Literary Prize 2011.

His latest, The Line of Mercy (2022), is a satirical-philosophical novel about crime, punishment, and the lives of mofussil India. "Tracking the debris of broken lives and screwball dreams, frantic fantasies and desperate schemes, Mercy does what only a handful of books in every age do: reveal the immorality of man-made moralities."

== Awards ==
- In 2001, named among the "50 leaders at the forefront of change in Asia" by Business Week.
- In 2006, named in the list of "India's elite", for being a "Pioneer of a brand of sting journalism which has transformed Indian media", by The Guardian.
- In 2006–07, won Le Prix Mille Pages award for his debut novel The Alchemy of Desire.
- In 2009, named among "India's 50 Most Powerful People 2009" by "Business Week".
- In 2010, bestowed with "Award for Excellence in Journalism" by the International Press Institute's India Chapter Award
- In 2011, selected as GQ India's man of the year.
- The Alchemy of Desire: won Le Prix Mille Pages for Best Foreign Literary Fiction shortlisted for Prix Femina
- The Valley of Masks: longlisted for the Man Asian Booker Prize

== Reception ==
Tejpal was criticised with allegations of conflict of interest related to the ownership of Tehelka, because political parties and businesses held shares in the company.

In 2013, Tejpal was accused by a female reporter of sexual assault and rape during the THiNK Festival in Goa. The trial began only in September 2017. On 21 May 2021, Tejpal was acquitted of all charges. Justice Kshama Joshi also noted substantial investigative bias and lacunae by the Investigating Officer in the case. The Goa Bench of Bombay High Court overturned this acquittal on 6 August 2026 and sentenced Tejpal to 10 years in prison.

== See also ==
- Radia tapes controversy
