= Literary Review =

British literary magazine

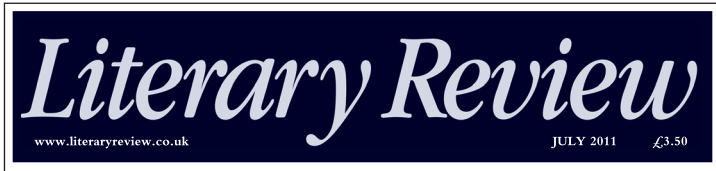

- Editor: Nancy Sladek
- Frequency: 11 per year
- Circulation: 44,750 (as of 2006[?])
- Founded: 1979; 47 years ago
- Country: United Kingdom
- Based in: London
- Language: English
- Website: literaryreview.co.uk
- ISSN: 0144-4360

Literary Review is a British literary magazine founded in 1979 by Anne Smith, then head of the Department of English at the University of Edinburgh. Its offices are on Lexington Street in Soho. The magazine was edited for fourteen years by veteran journalist Auberon Waugh. The current editor is Nancy Sladek.

The magazine reviews a wide range of published books, including fiction, history, politics, biography and travel, and additionally prints new fiction. It is also known for the annual Bad Sex in Fiction Award that ran from 1993 to 2019.

== Bad Sex in Fiction Award ==
Each year since 1993, Literary Review has presented the annual Bad Sex in Fiction Award to the author it deems to have produced the worst description of a sex scene in a novel. The award is symbolically presented in the form of what has been described as a "semi-abstract trophy representing sex in the 1950s", depicting a naked woman draped over an open book. The award was established by Rhoda Koenig, a literary critic, and Auberon Waugh, then the magazine's editor.

The aim of the award is "to draw attention to the crude, tasteless, often perfunctory use of redundant passages of sexual description in the modern novel, and to discourage it". The enduring relevance of this rationale has been questioned, based on concerns about censorious public shaming (including online) of authors of serious literary fiction.

=== Winners ===
- 1993: Melvyn Bragg, A Time to Dance
- 1994: Philip Hook, The Stonebreakers, presented by Marianne Faithfull
- 1995: Philip Kerr, Gridiron
- 1996: David Huggins, The Big Kiss: An Arcade Mystery
- 1997: Nicholas Royle, The Matter of the Heart, presented by Stephen Fry
- 1998: Sebastian Faulks, Charlotte Gray
- 1999: A. A. Gill, Starcrossed
- 2000: Sean Thomas, Kissing England
- 2001: Christopher Hart, Rescue Me
- 2002: Wendy Perriam, Tread Softly
- 2003: Aniruddha Bahal, Bunker 13
- 2004: Tom Wolfe, I Am Charlotte Simmons, presented by Sting
- 2005: Giles Coren, Winkler
- 2006: Iain Hollingshead, Twenty Something
- 2007: Norman Mailer, The Castle in the Forest
- 2008: Rachel Johnson, Shire Hell; John Updike, Lifetime Achievement Award
- 2009: Jonathan Littell, The Kindly Ones
- 2010: Rowan Somerville, The Shape of Her
- 2011: David Guterson, Ed King
- 2012: Nancy Huston, Infrared
- 2013: Manil Suri, The City of Devi
- 2014: Ben Okri, The Age of Magic
- 2015: Morrissey, List of the Lost
- 2016: Erri De Luca, The Day Before Happiness
- 2017: Christopher Bollen, The Destroyers
- 2018: James Frey, Katerina, presented by Kim Wilde
- 2019: Didier Decoin, The Office of Gardens and Ponds and John Harvey, Pax, presented by Nicky Haslam
- 2020: Not awarded, citing that people have been "subjected to too many bad things this year"
- 2021: Not awarded.
- 2022: Not awarded, but according to the judges, if there had been an award, it would have gone to Suleika Dawson for The Secret Heart.

== Contributors ==
Contributors to the magazine have included Diana Athill, Kingsley Amis, Martin Amis, Beryl Bainbridge, John Banville, Julian Barnes, Maile Chapman, Boris Dralyuk, Hilary Mantel, John Mortimer, Malcolm Bradbury, A. S. Byatt, Paul Johnson, David Starkey, John Gray, Robert Harris, Nick Hornby, Richard Ingrams, Joseph O'Neill, Lynn Barber, Derek Mahon, Oleg Gordievsky, John Sutherland, D. J. Taylor, William Trevor, Claire Keegan and Nicola Barker.
