= K. D. Singh (politician) =

Indian politician

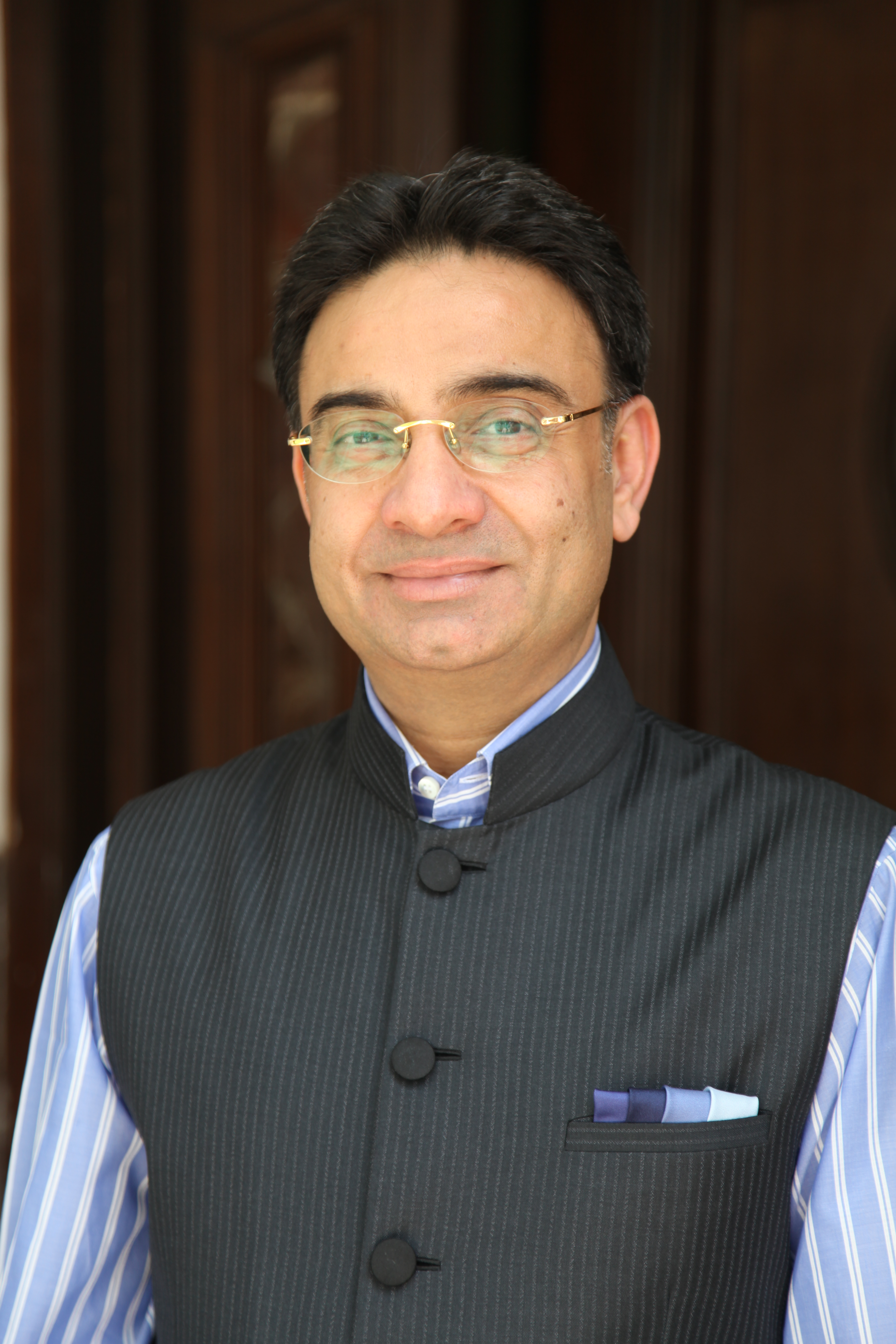
- Singh in June 2012

MP of Rajya Sabha for West Bengal
- In office 3 April 2014 – before 2016

Personal details
- Born: Kanwardeep Singh; 21 August 1961 (age 65) Fatehgarh Sahib, Punjab, India
- Party: All India Trinamool Congress
- Spouse: Harpreet Kaur
- Education: Punjabi University
- Website: K D Singh; KDSinghBlog

Kanwar Deep Singh (born 21 August 1961), also known as K. D. Singh, is an Indian businessman turned politician and Member of Parliament (MP), Rajya Sabha representing the All India Trinamool Congress, but first elected to the Indian parliament as a nominee of the Jharkhand Mukti Morcha. He is the founder and the former chairman of the Indian business group called Turbo Industries, whose name was changed and rebranded as the Alchemist Group in 2004. He was elected to lead the Indian Hockey Federation (IHF) between 2013 and 2014.

Singh's political and business career has been marred by various controversies, with several of his organisation's subsidiaries and he being banned because of alleged illegal businesses by the Securities and Exchange Board of India. He was the major investor in the Tehelka magazine known for undercover sting operations, and has been alleged to have planned and financed the Narada sting operation against his own party and state-level All India Trinamool Congress leaders, according to The Mint newspaper. He was accused in an alleged ponzi scam in 2009 and remains under enforcement proceedings.

== Early life and business ==
Singh was born on 21 August 1961. He started his business in 1988 under the banner of Tubro Industries. His first factory in Chandigarh produced wire mesh and link fencing. The name was changed to Alchemist in 2004. The Alchemist Group has a presence in healthcare, pharmaceuticals, food-processing, real estate, infrastructure and tea estates, possessing well-known retail brands like Republic of Chicken. He stepped down from his position as Chairman of the Alchemist Group in 2012 to devote his time to political and social causes. Currently, he is the Chairman Emeritus of the Alchemist Group, while his son Karan Deep Singh now chairs the Group.

K.D. Singh also owns majority stake in Anant Media Private Limited, which publishes Tehelka magazine, one of India's leading investigative weeklies. In March 2013, Tehelka reported that Punjabis in the northern state of Haryana want Singh as their chief minister.

He was conferred a Doctorate in Business Administration (Honoris Causa) by the Anglia Ruskin University, Cambridge (UK).

== Political career ==
In 2010, the Jharkhand Mukti Morcha (JMM) nominated him to the Rajya Sabha. Only few months later, he switched sides to become a member of the All India Trinamool Congress. Since, he was the sole member of the house (and thus the house-leader of the party), the anti-defection laws were held to be not viable. He was soon made the party in-charge of northern India (Punjab, Haryana, Himachal Pradesh, Jammu and Kashmir and the Union Territory of Chandigarh).

== Controversies ==
=== Cash-for-vote ===
Singh has been alleged to have paid his way into the upper house of Parliament. An IBN-Cobrapost sting captured six MLAs from various political parties in Jharkhand were offered money to vote for a particular candidate during Rajya-Sabha elections and subsequent investigations by CBI led to the registration of a FIR against Singh. Tek Lal Mahto, a MLA belonging to JMM reportedly said in the sting:-- "KD Singh has been spending only in one direction"- when the reporter says Singh is likely to win as he has been spending so much money.

=== Ponzi scam ===
In February 2009, an Income Tax (I-T) raided at 11 premises of the Alchemist Group across India led to the discovery of unaccounted income of Rs. 22 crores.

In July 2013, complaints of default from multiple quarters started pouring in, which threw a spotlight on the ponzi business run by Alchemist Group in Eastern India. Subsequently, the Securities Appellate Tribunal gave 18 months' time to Alchemist Infra Realty Ltd for complying with Sebi orders that had asked the company to refund an estimated Rs 1,000 crore collected from public through unauthorised 'collective investment schemes' (CIS). The company had collected about Rs 1,000 crore from about 1.5 million investors.

=== Narada sting ===
He is also alleged to have funded about 80 lakh INR to Matthew Samuel for the Narada sting operation which video-taped several high-ranking politicians of the All India Trinamul Congress (AITC) accepting cash-bribes in exchange of providing unofficial favours to a company.

Singh has denied any involvement.

=== Arrest ===
On 13 January 2021, he was arrested by the Enforcement Directorate on money laundering charges. The alleged scam is stated to be about Rs 1,900 crore and the agency had attached assets worth Rs 239 crore of Alchemist Infra Realty Ltd in 2019. It has been alleged by investigators that the company launched an illegal collective investment scheme, also called a ponzi or chit fund scheme, and mobilised funds of about Rs 1,916 crore from the public in the years preceding 2015. The second money laundering case against him and others is based on an FIR filed by the Kolkata Police. In this criminal case initiated in 2018, the Kolkata Police had booked Singh, his son Karandeep Singh, Alchemist Township India Limited, Alchemist Holdings Limited and various other group companies and directors for cheating thousands of customers.

== Indian Hockey Federation ==
On 29 July 2013, the Indian Hockey Federation (IHF) issued a media release announcing Singh's elevation from his post of Vice-President to that of President.

== See also ==
- K D Singh Foundation
