= Alchemist Group =

Indian conglomerate

- Type: Private
- Industry: Conglomerate
- Founded: 1981; 45 years ago
- Founder: K.D. Singh
- Headquarters: New Delhi
- Area served: India
- Key people: K.D. Singh (Chairman)
- Products: Food Processing, Hotels & Resorts, Road Technologies, Healthcare, Information Technology, Agriculture, Infrastructure, Healthcare and Information Technology
- Number of employees: 9,800 (2020)
- Website: www.alchemist.co.in

Alchemist Group is an Indian conglomerate which has a presence in multiple sectors, including healthcare, pharmaceuticals, food-processing, real estate, infrastructure and tea estates. It was founded by businessman turned politician K.D. Singh. The flagship company of Alchemist Group – Alchemist Limited is a publicly traded at NSE & BSE. Multiple central and state government agencies in India including SEBI has barred many companies of Alchemist group for multiple violations. Securities Appellate Tribunal had earlier ordered Alchemist group to comply with SEBI orders that had asked the company to refund an estimated Rs 1,000 crore collected from public through unauthorised collective investment schemes (CIS). On August 7, 2015, Alchemist Capital was told to refund 165 crore with 15% interest for issuing 16.52 crore RPS of Rs 10 each amounting to Rs 165.21 crore up.
