= Tehelka =

Indian news magazine

- Editor: Charanjit Ahuja
- Former editors: Tarun Tejpal; Aniruddha Bahal; Sanjay Dubey
- Categories: News Portal, Magazine
- Circulation: 58741 Avg March (2019)*
- Publisher: Swinder Bajwa
- Founder: Tarun Tejpal; Aniruddha Bahal
- Founded: 1999; 27 years ago
- First issue: 2000–2003 (website) 2004–2007 (tabloid) 2007–present day (magazine)
- Company: Tehelka.com Pvt Ltd; Kanwar Deep Singh and his Anant Media Pvt. Ltd
- Country: India
- Based in: New Delhi
- Language: English, Hindi
- Website: tehelka.com; tehelkahindi.com

Tehelka (transl. Sensation) is an Indian news magazine known for its investigative journalism and sting operations. According to the British newspaper The Independent, the Tehelka was founded by Tarun Tejpal, Aniruddha Bahal and another colleague who worked together at the Outlook magazine after "an investor with deep pockets" agreed to underwrite their startup. Bahal left Tehelka in 2005 to start Cobrapost – an Indian news website, after which Tehelka was managed by Tejpal through 2013. In 2013, Tejpal stepped aside from Tehelka after being accused of sexual assault by his employee. Tehelka had cumulative losses of ₹66 crore (US$6.9 million) till 2013, while being majority owned and financed by Kanwar Deep Singh – an industrialist, a politician and a member of Indian parliament (Rajya Sabha).

The magazine began circulating tabloid-format newspapers in 2004 and switched to magazine in 2007. Tehelka's first sting operation was on a cricket match fixing scandal in 2000. In 2001, it won national fame and public support for its sting "Operation West End". This 2001 undercover operation recorded and released footage of government officials accepting prostitutes and bribes in a fake arms deal. This caused the resignations of several officials including the then Defence Minister and two presidents of the ruling parties. In 2007, Tehelka published a report against members of the Bajrang Dal and for their role in the Naroda Patiya massacre during the 2002 Gujarat violence. The report, called "The Truth: Gujarat 2002", was based on a six-month sting operation with video footage of the members admitting their role in the violence. It won the International Press Institute (IPI) India Award for Excellence in Journalism in 2010 and 2011.

== History ==
Tarun Tejpal, Aniruddha Bahal and a colleague quit their jobs from Outlook magazine and started Tehelka in New Delhi as a website in 2000.

Tehelka gained national fame when Aniruddha Bahal and Matthew Samuel completed and published undercover videotapes about corruption in a fake arms deal through the sting – "Operation West End" – in 2001. The Tehelka report triggered a government inquiry. The exposé caught senior defence personnel and politicians of the Samata Party, the Bharatiya Janata Party and others accepting bribes from a fake company offering fake defence products. The scandal and subsequent inquiry led to the resignation of many including India's Defence Minister. Politicians from various parties called for action against Tehelka journalists for its unethical methods such as procuring and providing prostitutes for its undercover sting. According to Navdip Dhariwal, the Tehelka staff saw the government inquiry as a direct attack on them. By 2003, Tehelka staff decreased from 120 to 3 and the website shut down because of debts. Bahal left Tehelka in the same year, saying the government was "bogging us down with a lot of legal nonsense" and later founded Cobrapost.com.

In 2004, after more than 200 writers, lawyers, business people and activists became founder-subscribers, Tehelka was relaunched as a reader-financed weekly newspaper in tabloid format. Among the supporters were activist Arundhati Roy, Congress party politician Shashi Tharoor and Nobel laureate V.S. Naipaul. It called itself the "People's Paper" and the reporters took a tour around the country promoting what they called "free, fair and fearless" journalism. After its Naroda Patiya sting operation in 2007, it sold around 75,000 to 90,000 copies per week. It still suffered large financial losses, since it attracted very few advertisements and the magazine primarily relied on subscribers and copies sold as of 2008. Tehelka had cumulative losses of ₹66 crore (US$6.9 million) through 2013, while being majority owned and financed by Kanwar Deep Singh – an industrialist, a politician and a member of Indian parliament (Rajya Sabha) initially elected by Jharkhand Mukti Morcha, later All India Trinamool Congress.

Tejpal changed Tehelka from tabloid to magazine in September 2007 to encourage more potential advertisers, but found it difficult because of their sting operations. Tejpal started the Hindi language website in 2007 and then Tehelka's Hindi News magazine. Sanjay Dubey was the executive editor of the Hindi magazine. In the early years, Tarun Tejpal was Tehelka's largest shareholder through his shell company Agni Media. In an interview to The New York Times, Tejpal stated that he covered the losses at Tehelka by soliciting funds from his personal contacts.

"THiNK Fest" was started in 2011 as an annual literary festival and promoted as an event of Tehelka, though the program was run by an organisation called Thinkworks Pvt Ltd, a company owned by Tejpal, his sister Neena and managing editor Shoma Chaudhury. It featured Bollywood actors, global thinkers and sessions on new technology.

According to The New York Times, during a Tehelka organized "Think Fest" event in November 2013, a staff reporter of Tehelka accused Tejpal of rape and repeated sexual assault. Tejpal was arrested by Goa police and he stepped aside as editor of Tehelka, and his colleague Shoma Chaudhury resigned from Tehelka on 28 November because of the incident. In 2014, Mathew Samuel became the managing editor of Tehelka. In March 2016, Charanjit Ahuja became the editor of the fortnightly.

== Sting operations ==
=== Match-fixing scandal (2000) ===
Bahal and Tejpal convinced cricketer Manoj Prabhakar to record conversations with his colleagues, after the South Africa cricket match fixing scandal involving Hansie Cronje in March 2000. Prabhakar and Bahal went around the country and Prabhakar, wearing hidden recording equipment, attended meetings with important Indian cricket board officials (BCCI) and players. He recorded conversations where they talked about links between players and bookmakers, matches being thrown in return for money, deliberate run-outs and the names of players involved. They recorded more than 40 hours of taped conversations, which the Central Bureau of Investigation (CBI) used as evidence for its own inquiry. The CBI implicated Mohammad Azharuddin, Ajay Jadeja and Ajay Sharma as the cricketers involved. The documentary Fallen Heroes: The Betrayal of a Nation, which was released in May of the same year, showed Prabhakar's work and Bahal published his report on Tehelka.com.

=== Operation West End (2001) ===
In 2001, Tehelka did its first major sting investigation called "Operation West End". It involved Mathew Samuel and Bahal, filming how they bribed several defence officials and politicians from the then-ruling NDA-led (National Democratic Alliance) Indian government, posing as arms dealers. Charging a commission from defence deals is illegal in India. They started their investigation in August 2000 because of hearing rumours of middlemen getting rich in such deals in the 1980s. They created a fake British company based in Regent Street, London called "West End". Bahal and Samuel then found out that the Indian army would be interested in obtaining thermal imaging cameras. They printed business cards and photographs of particular camera models in Tehelka's office in suburban Delhi and Samuel did the main dealings.

They initially had to bribe junior officials in the defence ministry for amounts ranging from ₹10,000 (US$100) to ₹60,000 (US$620), to help them in securing deals with several middlemen. These middlemen said they "fixed" deals before involving jets and artillery; Samuel and Bahal recorded these conversations using hidden cameras. They dealt with Samata Party President Jaya Jaitley (The then Defence Minister George Fernandes belonged to this party), whom they paid ₹300,000 (US$3,100), and she agreed to tell Fernandes about them. After bribing other officials, they were introduced to the then Bharatiya Janta Party (BJP) President Bangaru Laxman who accepted ₹150,000 (US$1,600) as a "small new year's gift". Laxman recommended they meet Brajesh Mishra, who was the National Security Advisor to Prime Minister Atal Bihari Vajpayee.

The operation took seven and a half months with Tejpal later saying that the total amount they paid in bribes was ₹1.5 million (US$16,000). The deals were in expensive hotels and few officials asked for branded whisky. In this whole operation, they recorded around 100 hours of video footage.

Six months after Tehelka had made public its investigations, The Indian Express acquired and published transcripts of the video tapes. It showed that as part of the investigations, the reporters hired prostitutes to serve the officials. This raised ethical questions about the methods used. Tejpal later issued a statement denying that any of its women staff were provided as prostitutes. Politicians of the ruling parties called for the journalist's arrest for supplying prostitutes and questioned their ethics. Tejpal called that part of the investigation as a "needed transgression". The public and majority of their competitors supported them; The Times of India concluded that the issue of ethics "pales before the sleaze their team has dug up", The Hindu called it a "turning point in Indian journalism" but The Indian Express criticised the methods used by the Tehelka team. Tejpal received death threats and was given police protection. His reporters said that their "extraordinary methods" were for the larger public and national interest.

V. S. Naipaul held a news conference and met the then Deputy Prime Minister L K Advani. Naipaul told the media, "This thing that has happened to Tehelka has been profoundly disappointing to me, It comes from another era. It serves no purpose. It seems to me it will profoundly damage the country." In 2004, the CBI registered cases against Jaitley, Laxman and others in the army and the Ministry of Defence. In 2012, Laxman was sentenced to four years in jail by additional sessions Judge Kanwal Jeet Arora for this case. Author and journalist Madhu Trehan wrote a non-fiction book in 2009 on this incident, called Tehelka as Metaphor.

=== "The Truth: Gujarat 2002" (2007) ===
In 2007, Tehelka released footage filmed over six months relating to the 2002 anti-Muslim riots in Gujarat. According to Uday Mahurkar writing in the India Today, it showed "VHP activists, actual perpetrators of the crimes as well as government counsel boasting" they had a role in attacking the Muslim community during the 2002 Gujarat violence. The report, called "The Truth: Gujarat 2002", was published in its 7 November 2007 issue and the video footage was shown on Aaj Tak. It said that the violence was possible because of approval by the state police, as well as the then Chief Minister of Gujarat Narendra Modi.

The Tehelka report was based on allegations made during the undercover interviews. According to Mahurkar, efforts to corroborate the allegations suggest that it contains "boastful lies". For example, two interviewees claimed that Modi visited them in Naroda Patiya and thanked them, when official records of the chief minister Modi's movements show he did not. Similarly, another VHP activist stated in the Tehelka report that a police superintendent named Gadhvi was on duty and killed five Muslims in Dariapur during the riots. However, attempts to corroborate this Tehelka report claim failed as Gadhvi arrived in Dariapur a month later.

== Other notable sting operations ==
- On 23 July 2009, when police in Manipur claimed they had killed a suspected militant who had shot at them, Tehelka released 12 photographs which showed the police pushing an unarmed person, who was their suspect, into a pharmacy and later carrying him out dead; thus, indicating it was a fake encounter. This report caused protests in Manipur, mainly against the power granted to security forces under the Armed Forces (Special Powers) Act, 1958 (AFSPA). The police used tear gas and imposed a curfew against these agitations.
- In 2010, Tehelka captured on camera, right-wing organisation Sri Ram Sena leader Pramod Muthalik and other members, agreeing to vandalise an art exhibition in exchange for money. The organisation was seen accepting ₹10,000 (US$100) as a donation from a Tehelka reporter, who posed as the artist wanting publicity.

== Criticism ==
Tehelka has been criticised mainly for its investigative journalism which led to the debate about its ethics. It has been accused of siding with the Congress party of India. After Tehelka got financial backing for its relaunch as a magazine, it was further accused of favouring the companies which supported "THiNK Fest" in spite of the magazine's previous anti-corporate stance. Tehelka has denied these allegations.

=== Private treaty: suppressing unfavorable reports ===
Raman Kripal, a senior editor of Tehelka, accused the magazine of suppressing a report that was unfavorable to the Goa mining industry, allegedly because Tehelka wanted Congress-led Digambar Kamat state government's support for the Tejpal owned and profitable "THiNK Fest" event in Goa. Tejpal defended Tehelka stating that Kripal was "asked to leave because of poor performance". According to Debarshi Dasgupta, it was an unusual coincidence that mining groups placed advertisements and sponsored Tehelka events just when the report was suppressed by Tehelka. Further, states a critical article in The Outlook, if Tehelka lost money in its operations, how was it able to acquire major properties in Goa? Given Tehelka purported goals and mission to fight for the public transparency, why did it secretly seek, misrepresent and receive a ₹0.85 crore (US$88,000) grant from the Goa government for the 2011 private Tehelka event to invite movie stars and other celebrities. The Tehelka and its sting targets, states the Outlook magazine, seem to be a "ruse to expand personal wealth [of Tejpal]".

According to Sevanti Ninan, a former Tehelka employee and later a columnist at the Mint newspaper, this was not an isolated event. Tehelka suppressed stories related to multiple sponsors. "Whenever there was a sponsor involved for Think Fest", states Ninan, "things would get murky for Tehelka and stories would be killed".

According to Maya Ranganathan, the post-Tejpal-arrest discussions and the critical examination of Tehelka have led multiple scholars to not only praise its early aim of being alternative mainstream non-conformist media, but recounted how it failed and how it allowed advertisers and those who paid to influence content published by Tehelka.

=== Unpaid workers, amassing mountain estate ===
Tehelka employees complained that they were not "even being paid their salaries regularly and many had to quit" in late 2000s and early 2010s, while at the same time Tehelka and Tejpal acquired "a swanky property near Nainital" and took "money from lifetime subscribers", or while the magazine's management visited London and boasted of their financial success. Similarly, the conflict of interest in the operations at Tehelka has been questioned because the magazine accepted money from Congress party's Kapil Sibal when he was a Union Minister.

=== Allegations of double standards ===
The former employees and journalists of Tehelka have criticized its founders and management for "lack of transparency" about the magazine's ownership, finances and who had been bankrolling their substantial annual losses. They have called the internal lack of transparency as something in stark contrast to the transparency it aims to share by publishing undercover sting operations on everyone outside of Tehelka. The Outlook quotes a former employee of Tehelka summarizing this criticism as "they [Tehelka's management] said it's their business to suspect people's intentions but refused to let others question them. I doubt they even followed half of the strict rules they set for others".

=== Sexual assault case against Tejpal ===
The sexual assault allegations against Tejpal in November 2013 received intense public attention and invited the media scrutiny of Tehelka. Tejpal's and Shoma Chaudhury's behavior immediately after the allegations emerged were seen as hypocrisy given Tehelka had previously published a special issue on sexual violence in India and highlighted victim's rights in February 2013. Within days of the sexual assault allegations, Tehelka emails and messages showed an attempt to "tarnish the victim's reputation". According to Tunku Varadarajan, the rhetoric in Tehelka about women's right sounded hollow, and "Tejpal is, perhaps, just another unreconstructed, predatory Indian male who was playing the part of politically correct editor for commercial effect" at Tehelka. Further, both Tejpal and his fellow Tehelka executive Chaudhury, "sought to minimize the damage by private treaty" with the victim, calling the assault as a "lapse of judgment", "awful misreading of the situation" and an "untoward incident", indicative of double standards in Tehelka for behavior that "carried a penalty of significant jail-time in the world outside Tehelka", states Varadarajan.

=== Ownership ===
As of 2013, Tehelka was running significant losses every year, and the Indian media questioned how and why these losses were being bankrolled by the industrialist and Trinamool Congress member K. D. Singh and his shell company Anant Media Private Limited and Alchemist group. The politician K. D. Singh has been accused of launching an undercover sting operation through an employee of Tehelka – Mathew Samuel – against politicians of his own party Trinamool Congress. Both Singh – the once majority shareholder of Tehelka – and his companies remain a target of serious fraud investigations including a ponzi scheme in West Bengal.

=== Sting journalism ===
After "Operation West End", Tehelka's "sting journalism" influenced the Indian media. Within five years, its news channels began to regularly feature sting operations. Tejpal called it the "greatest tool of journalistic investigation and exposure" and that it was for public interest.

Inspired by Tehelka's method and the resulting national fame, a flood of sting and entrapment operations were increasingly "routinized as the corporeal edge of public life" in India, states Ravi Sundaram. These ranged from anticorruption exposés, political battles, domestic battles, propaganda material against opponents, publicity tool and to blackmail. False claims, careless lies, speculative hearsay and doctored tapes purportedly in "public interest" were created and published to misrepresent the reality and to target opponents and innocent lives. Fabricated sting operations published by a media group, for example, accused a local school teacher of operating a prostitution ring which led to upset parents and violent riots. In another case, a company's management hired a "sting journalism" team to gather evidence against its own workers. Concerned with the growing misuse of sting journalism, an Indian court ruled, "Sting operations showing acts and facts as they are truly and actually happening may be necessary in public interest and as a tool for justice, but a hidden camera cannot be allowed to depict something which is not true, correct and is not happening but has happened because of inducement by entrapping a person", according to Ravi Sundaram.

According to Maya Ranganathan, the genre of sting journalism started by Tehelka in India has spawned 'entrapment journalism'. Unlike other countries such as the USA where 'sting journalism' is illegal, in India it is legal and has increasing led to "aims and means" where a sting journalist team presumes a group or ideology as corrupt, targets them through undercover operation to show them to be corrupt, and then plies them with promise of large bribes (financial reward) or social pressure till the resistance of the target cracks. The target succumbs to the entrapment and is captured in the moment of weakness by a hidden camera. The target may have no criminal intent to begin with, but was goaded into a criminal act by the "sting journalist". Though sensational and potentially destructive for the target, it does not serve the public interest.

Authorities and politicians demanded a sort of legislation over such "stings". Journalists against such sting operations, questioned the difference between this type of reporting and entrapment. Others questioned whether some subjects of the sting journalism were in public interest or a form of voyeurism. The Supreme Court of India expressed its concern over the cases of freelance reporters selling their sting reports, questioning whether their intent was for money or public interest. Cases of sting operations where fake evidence were given increased the court's criticism. Tejpal said, "there may be bad, motivated and indifferent stings - but that is no different from the rest of journalism".

== Awards ==
- In 2007, The Guardian named Tarun Tejpal among the 20 who constitute "India's new elite" for being a pioneer in sting journalism.
- In 2010, The Daily Beast named Shoma Chaudhury among the 150 in the list of "women who shake the world".
- In 2010, Tehelka won the IPI India Award for Excellence in Journalism (International Press Institute) for its report on the fake encounter by security forces in Manipur.
- In 2011, Tehelka won the IPI India Award for Excellence in Journalism, which was shared with The Week, for its report on the "rent a riot" tactics of the Sri Ram Sena (The Week won it for its report on fake medical and dental colleges).
- In 2012, Tushita Mittal, from the magazine's Kolkata bureau, won the Chameli Devi Jain award for Outstanding Woman Mediaperson for 2012 for her reports on interior Bengal, Odisha and Chhattisgarh affected by Naxal violence.
- In 2012, Jeemon Jecob, the South India bureau chief, was nominated for Statesman award (started by The Statesman group) for rural reporting.
