= Domestic Mail Manual =

Document detailing USPS policies and prices

The Domestic Mail Manual (DMM) is a document that lays out the policies and prices of the United States Postal Service (USPS). In legal parlance, it contains "the Mailing Standards of the United States Postal Service". Changes to the DMM are announced in the Federal Register. The DMM sets postage rates and all other aspects of the USPS' service delivery.
