= Main Atal Hoon =

- Theatrical release poster
- Directed by: Ravi Jadhav
- Story by: Ravi Jadhav; Rishi Virmani
- Produced by: Vinod Bhanushali; Sandeep Singh; Kamlesh Bhanushali
- Starring: Pankaj Tripathi
- Cinematography: Lawrence D'Cunha
- Edited by: Bunty Nagi
- Music by: Songs: Salim–Sulaiman; Payal Dev; Kailash Kher; Amitraj; Background Score: Monty Sharma
- Production companies: Bhanushali Studios Limited; Legend Studios
- Distributed by: Pen Marudhar Entertainment
- Release date: 19 January 2024
- Running time: 137 minutes
- Country: India
- Language: Hindi
- Budget: ₹20 crore
- Box office: ₹8.65 crore

Main Atal Hoon (stylised as Main ATAL Hoon) is a 2024 Hindi language biographical film directed by Ravi Jadhav and written by Rishi Virmani. It stars Pankaj Tripathi as Former Prime Minister, Atal Bihari Vajpayee. The film is produced by Vinod Bhanushali, Sandeep Singh and Kamlesh Bhanushali under the banner Bhanushali Studios Limited and Legend Studios.

The film was theatrically released in India on 19 January 2024. The film was a box office bomb.

== Premise ==
The film follows the life of Atal Bihari Vajpayee, a former prime minister of India.

It highlights Vajpayee's role in leading India during challenging times, including the Kargil War with Pakistan and the Pokhran nuclear tests. It also explores the man behind the politician, revealing his personal struggles and relationships with family and friends beyond party lines, as well as his love for poetry and literature.

== Cast ==
- Pankaj Tripathi as Atal Bihari Vajpayee (Atalji), Prime Minister of India
- Piyush Mishra as Krishna Bihari Vajpayee, Atalji's father and a school teacher
- Raja Rameshkumar Sevak as Lal Krishna "L. K." Advani (Lalji)
- Daya Shankar Pandey as Pandit Deen Dayal Upadhyaya
- Pramod Pathak as Dr. Syama Prasad Mukherjee
- Payal Nair as Indira Gandhi
- Rajesh Khatri as Morarji Desai
- Eklakh Khan as Jayaprakash Narayan
- Harshad Kumar as Pramod Mahajan
- Haresh Khatri as Jawaharlal Nehru
- Sapna Yadav as Kamala Nehru
- Paula McGlynn as Sonia Gandhi
- Gauri Sukhtankar as Sushma Swaraj
- Salim Mulla as Dr. A. P. J. Abdul Kalam, aerospace, defence and nuclear scientist
- Prasanna Ketkar as M. S. Golwalkar
- Ajay Purkar as K. B. Hedgewar
- Rajesh Dubey as Nanaji Deshmukh
- Krishna Saajnani as Reporter
- Ekta Kaul as Rajkumari Kaul
- Harshal Gire as Muniwar

== Production ==
=== Filming ===
The principal photography of film went on floors on 7 May 2023 in Mumbai followed by an extensive shoot in Lucknow and ended on 15 July 2023.

== Music ==
Main Atal Hoon

Soundtrack album by Salim–Sulaiman, Payal Dev, Kailash Kher and Amitraj
- Released: 19 January 2024
- Recorded: 2022–23
- Studio: Hitz Music
- Genre: Feature film soundtrack
- Length: 15:08
- Language: Hindi

The music of the film is composed by Salim–Sulaiman, Payal Dev, Kailash Kher and Amitraj while the background score is composed by Monty Sharma.

The first single titled "Desh Pehle" was released on 25 December 2023. The second single titled "Ram Dhun" was released on 4 January 2023. The third single titled "Hindu Tan-Man" was released on 11 January 2023.

Track list
No.	Title	Lyrics	Music	Singer(s)	Length
1.	"Desh Pehle"	Manoj Muntashir	Payal Dev	Jubin Nautiyal	3:55
2.	"Ram Dhun"	Kailash Kher	Kailash Kher	Kailash Kher	3:55
3.	"Hindu Tan-Man"	Atal Bihari Vajpayee	Amitraj	Amitraj, Kailash Kher, Chorus	3:04
4.	"Ankaha"	Manoj Muntashir	Salim–Sulaiman	Armaan Malik Shreya Ghoshal	3:43
5.	"Main Atal Hoon Theme"	-	Salim–Sulaiman	Sonu Nigam	1:03
Total length:					15:08

== Release ==
Main Atal Hoon was released in theaters on 19 January 2024. The film was digitally premiered on ZEE5 from 14 March 2024.

== Reception ==
=== Box office ===
The film reportedly earned ₹1 crore on its day of release. Internationally too, it failed to get much attention drawing only $1.5 million at the global box office in its first week.

=== Critical response ===
Tripathi's performance was praised by the critics, but the editing of the movie was criticised. On the review aggregator website Rotten Tomatoes, 33% of 12 critics' reviews are positive, with an average rating of 5.6/10.

A reviewer from Bollywood Hungama awarded the film 2/5 stars and wrote "Main Atal Hoon rests on Pankaj Tripathi’s outstanding performance. But it suffers big time due to its flawed and disjointed narrative." Shubhra Gupta of The Indian Express gave 2/5 stars and wrote "Despite Pankaj Tripathi's inspired portrayal, the film is reduced to a rah-rah hagiography of former PM Atal Bihari Vajpayee, and fails to do justice to his multiple facets."

NDTV's Saibal Chatterjee rated the film 2/5 and wrote "In a purely cinematic sense, it is impossible to be enthused over what Main Atal Hoon has to offer. But in the context of the film's undisguised raison d'etre, it may not be a total washout."
