= Good Governance Day =

Indian holiday

- Observed by: India
- Type: National
- Significance: Birth anniversary of former Prime Minister Atal Bihari Vajpayee
- Date: 25 December
- Next time: 25 December 2026
- Duration: One day
- Frequency: Annual
- First time: 2014

Good Governance Day (Hindi: सुशासन दिवस, IAST: Suśāsan Divas) is observed in India annually on the twenty-fifth day of December, the birth anniversary of former-Prime Minister Atal Bihari Vajpayee. Good Governance Day was established in 2014 to honor Prime Minister Vajpayee by fostering awareness among the Indian people of accountability in government.

In keeping with this principle, the Government of India has decreed Good Governance Day to be a working day for the government.

== Establishment ==
On 23 December 2014, the ninety-year old former Prime Minister Atal Bihari Vajpayee, and Pandit Madan Mohan Malaviya (posthumously) were announced as recipients of India's highest civilian award for merit, the Bharat Ratna, by Indian President Pranab Mukherjee.

Following the announcement, the newly elected administration of Prime Minister Narendra Modi established that the birth anniversary of the former Prime Minister would be henceforth commemorated annually in India as Good Governance Day.

Critics criticized setting Good Governance Day on the same date as Christmas as well as for declaring this date as a government working day.

== Good Governance Index ==
In 2019, the Modi government launched the Good Governance Index, "a scientifically prepared tool based on various parameters of good governance which assess the level of any state at a given point of time and help in shaping future development."

== See also ==
- Good governance
