= Maharani Laxmi Bai Govt. College of Excellence =

Government college in Madhya Pradesh, India

Maharani Laxmi Bai Government College of Excellence
- Former names: Victoria College, Gwalior; Lashkar Madarsa
- Type: Government College
- Established: 1846; 180 years ago
- Academic affiliations: Jiwaji University (1964–present); Vikram University (1957–1964); Dr. Bhimrao Ambedkar University (1927–1957); University of Allahabad (1887–1927); University of Calcutta (1857–1887)
- Location: Gwalior, Madhya Pradesh, India; 26.1971237°N 78.1636051°E
- Campus: Urban
- Website: mlbcollegegwalior.org

Maharani Laxmi Bai Government College of Excellence, Gwalior or M.L.B. Government College of Excellence, Gwalior is a government college in Gwalior, Madhya Pradesh, India which is affiliated with Jiwaji University.

== History ==
It was established in 1846 as Lashkar Madarsa. In 1887 its name was changed into Victoria College and in 1957 it was renamed after Maharani Laxmi Bai. It was affiliated with the University of Calcutta until 1887; from 1887 to 1927 with the University of Allahabad; from 1927 to 1957 with Agra University; and from 1957 to 1964 with Vikram University. Since 1964 it has been affiliated with Jiwaji University.

== Notable alumni ==
- Atal Bihari Vajpayee, former Prime Minister of India
- Dhyan Chand, field hockey player
- Roop Singh, field hockey player
- Shivmangal Singh Suman, poet and academician
- Kaptan Singh Solanki, politician
- Manoj Kumar Sharma, Indian Police Service officer
