= Atal Bihari Vajpayee =

Prime Minister of India (1996; 1998–99, 1999–2004)

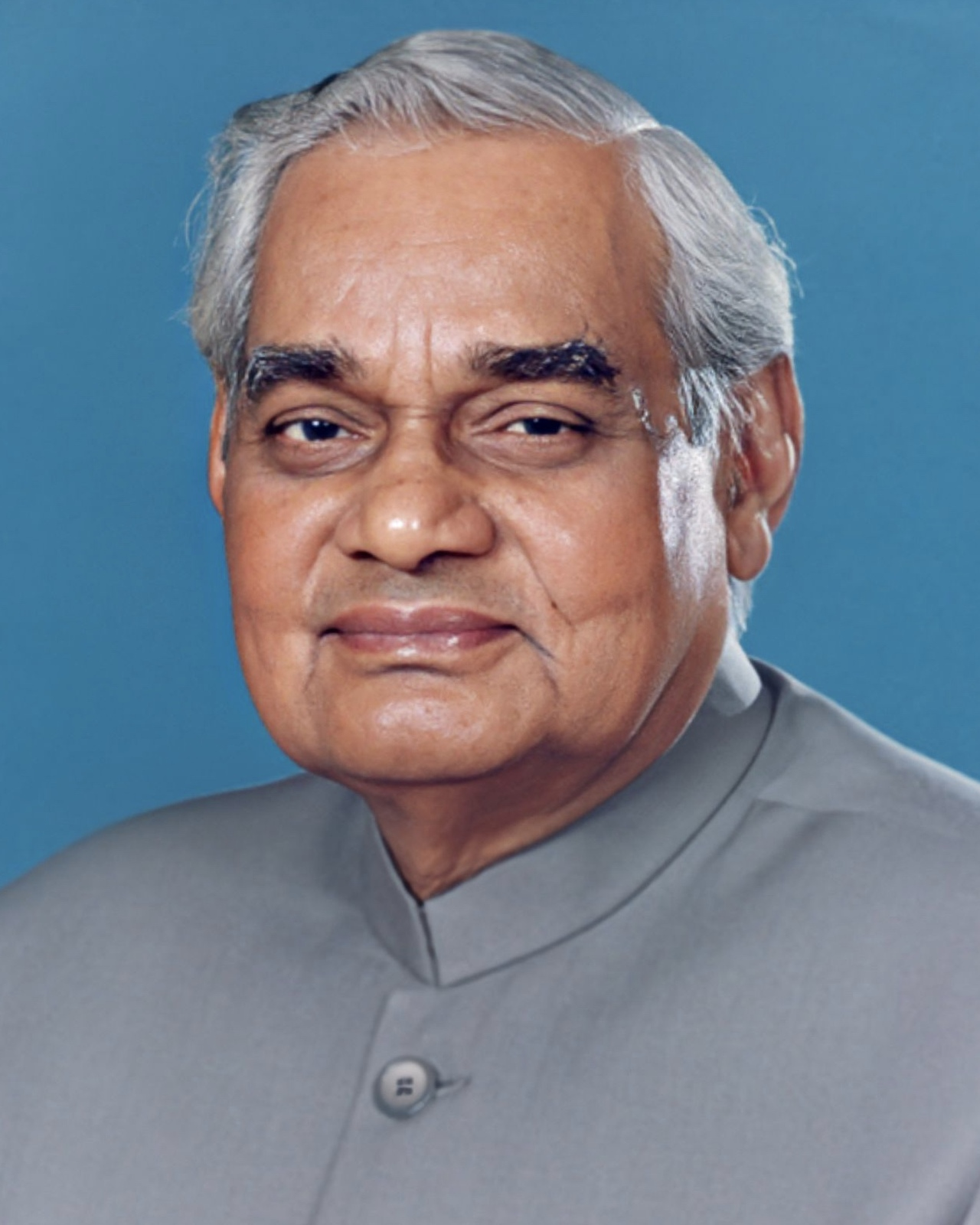
- Official portrait, 1998

Prime Minister of India
- In office 19 March 1998 – 22 May 2004
- President: K. R. Narayanan; A. P. J. Abdul Kalam
- Vice President: Krishan Kant; Bhairon Singh Shekhawat
- Deputy: L. K. Advani (from 29 June 2002)
- Preceded by: Inder Kumar Gujral
- Succeeded by: Manmohan Singh
- In office 16 May 1996 – 1 June 1996
- President: Shankar Dayal Sharma
- Vice President: K. R. Narayanan
- Preceded by: P. V. Narasimha Rao
- Succeeded by: H. D. Deve Gowda

Union Minister of External Affairs
- In office 26 March 1977 – 28 July 1979
- Prime Minister: Morarji Desai
- Preceded by: Yashwantrao Chavan
- Succeeded by: Shyam Nandan Prasad Mishra

Union Minister of Statistics and Programme Implementation
- In office 1 July 2002 – 22 May 2004
- Prime Minister: Himself
- Preceded by: Maneka Gandhi
- Succeeded by: Oscar Fernandes
- In office 13 October 1999 – 1 September 2001
- Prime Minister: Himself
- Preceded by: Ministry opened
- Succeeded by: Jagmohan
Parliamentary offices
Member of Parliament, Lok Sabha
In office 19 June 1991 – 16 May 2009
Preceded by	Mandhata Singh
Succeeded by	Lalji Tandon
Constituency	Lucknow, Uttar Pradesh
In office 26 March 1977 – 31 December 1984
Preceded by	Mukul Banerjee
Succeeded by	K. C. Pant
Constituency	New Delhi, Delhi
In office 15 March 1971 – 25 March 1977
Preceded by	Ram Awtar Sharma
Succeeded by	N. K. Shejwalkar
Constituency	Gwalior, Madhya Pradesh
In office 1967–1971
Preceded by	Subhadra Joshi
Succeeded by	Chandra Bhal Mani Tiwari
Constituency	Balrampur, Uttar Pradesh
In office 1957–1962
Succeeded by	Subhadra Joshi
Constituency	Balrampur, Uttar Pradesh
Member of Parliament, Rajya Sabha
In office 1986–1991
Constituency	Madhya Pradesh
In office 1962–1967
Constituency	Uttar Pradesh
Party political offices
1st National President of the Bharatiya Janata Party
In office 1980–1986
Preceded by	Office established
Succeeded by	L. K. Advani
11th President of the Bharatiya Jana Sangh
In office 1968–1972
Preceded by	Deendayal Upadhyaya
Succeeded by	L. K. Advani

Personal details
- Born: 25 December 1924 Gwalior, Gwalior State, British India (present-day Madhya Pradesh, India)
- Died: 16 August 2018 (aged 93) New Delhi, Delhi, India
- Party: Bharatiya Janata Party (from 1980)
- Other political affiliations: Janata Party (1977–1980); Bharatiya Jana Sangh (1951–1977)
- Education: Victoria College, Gwalior (B.A); DAV College, Kanpur (M.A)^{[a]}
- Occupation: Politician; poet; writer; journalist
- Awards: See below
- Monuments: Sadaiv Atal
- a. At the time of graduation, it was affiliated with Agra University.

Atal Bihari Vajpayee (25 December 1924 – 16 August 2018) was an Indian statesman and a poet who served as prime minister of India, from 1998 to 2004, and previously for two weeks in 1996. He was the first non-Congress prime minister to serve a full term in the office. Vajpayee was one of the co-founders and a senior leader of the Bharatiya Janata Party (BJP). He was a volunteer and full-time functionary (pracharak) of the Rashtriya Swayamsevak Sangh (RSS), a right-wing Hindutva paramilitary volunteer organisation. Vajpayee combined cultural nationalism with political moderation, shaping a distinctive strand of post-Independence Indian conservatism rooted in civilisational identity. Vajpayee represented a current in Hindu nationalism that sought to harmonise cultural identity with democratic pluralism.

The longest-serving member of the Indian Parliament and its lower house, the Lok Sabha, Vajpayee was a parliamentarian for over five decades, having been elected ten times to the Lok Sabha, and twice to the Rajya Sabha, the upper house of Parliament. He served as the Member of Parliament from Lucknow, Gwalior, New Delhi and Balrampur constituencies, before retiring from active politics in 2009 due to health concerns. He was among the founding members of the Bharatiya Jana Sangh (BJS), of which he was president from 1968 to 1972. The BJS merged with several other parties to form the Janata Party, which won the 1977 general election. In March 1977, Vajpayee became the minister of external affairs in the cabinet of Prime Minister Morarji Desai. He resigned in 1979, and the Janata alliance collapsed soon after. Former members of the Bharatiya Jana Sangh formed the BJP in 1980, with Vajpayee as its first president.

During his tenure as prime minister, India carried out the Pokhran-II nuclear tests in 1998, postured as nation's self-assertion. Vajpayee sought to improve diplomatic relations with Pakistan, travelling to Lahore by bus to meet with Prime Minister, Nawaz Sharif. After the 1999 Kargil War with Pakistan, he sought to restore relations through engagement with President Pervez Musharraf, inviting him to India for a summit at Agra. Vajpayee's government introduced many domestic economic and infrastructural reforms, including encouraging the private sector and foreign investments, reducing governmental waste, encouraging research and development, and the privatisation of some government owned corporations.

Vajpayee's tenure was marked by several major challenges, including the 1999 Kargil intrusion by Pakistan-backed forces, and the 2001 Indian Parliament attack carried out by Pakistan-based jihadist groups. The Parliament attack led to Operation Parakram, one of the largest post-Independence military mobilisations. The 2002 Gujarat riots followed the burning of coach S-6 of the Sabarmati Express at Godhra, in which many Ram Sevaks returning from Ayodhya were killed after a mob attacked and set the train on fire. Although the riots drew national and international criticism, scholars note that Vajpayee's defeat in the 2004 general election was more directly linked to economic factors, rural distress, and the miscalculated India Shining campaign rather than any single event.

Vajpayee was conferred with the Padma Vibhushan, India's second highest civilian award in 1992 by the Narasimha Rao led government. In 2014, the Narendra Modi administration declared Vajpayee's birthday, 25 December to be celebrated as Good Governance Day. In 2015, he was honoured India's highest civilian honour - Bharat Ratna, by the Modi government. He died in 2018 due to age-related illness. Vajpayee has left a lasting legacy as one of the great leaders of modern India. His name is commemorated across the nation including the Atal Tunnel, Atal Setu bridge, and several notable educational institutions.

== Early life and education ==
Vajpayee was born into a Kanyakubja Brahmin family on 25 December 1924 in Gwalior, Madhya Pradesh. His mother was Krishna Devi and his father was Krishna Bihari Vajpayee. His father was a school teacher in Gwalior. His grandfather, Shyam Lal Vajpayee, hails from Morena, Madhya Pradesh. Later he shifted to Gwalior from Morena for better opportunities.

Vajpayee did his primary schooling at the Saraswati Shishu Mandir, Gwalior and high school education from the Gorkhi School, Gwalior. He subsequently attended Gwalior's Victoria College, (now Maharani Laxmi Bai Govt. College of Excellence) where he graduated with a Bachelor of Arts in Hindi, English and Sanskrit. Later for master's degree the Scindia dynasty of erstwhile Gwalior state sanctioned him monthly scholarship of ₹75 and with this scholarship support he completed his post-graduation with a Master of Arts in political science from DAV College, Kanpur, Agra University. Commentators note that the discipline and cultural outlook of the Rashtriya Swayamsevak Sangh influenced Vajpayee's early understanding of Indian nationhood, particularly its emphasis on social reform, self-cultivation, and civilisational continuity.

== Early works as activist ==
His activism started in Gwalior with Arya Kumar Sabha, the youth wing of the Arya Samaj movement, of which he became the general secretary in 1944. He also joined the Rashtriya Swayamsevak Sangh (RSS) in 1939 as a swayamsevak, or volunteer in Gwalior at the age of 12 years. Influenced by Babasaheb Apte, he attended the Officers Training Camp of the RSS during 1940 to 1944, becoming a pracharak (RSS terminology for a full-time worker) in 1947. He gave up studying law due to the partition riots. He was sent to Uttar Pradesh as a vistarak (a probationary pracharak) and soon began working for the newspapers of Deendayal Upadhyaya: Rashtradharma (a Hindi monthly), Panchjanya (a Hindi weekly), and the dailies Swadesh and Veer Arjun.

Although the RSS had chosen not to participate in the Quit India Movement, in August 1942, Vajpayee, along with elder brother Prem. was arrested for 24 days during the Quit India Movement. He was released after giving a written statement that while he was a part of the crowd, he did not participate in the militant events in Bateshwar on 27 August 1942. Throughout his life, including after he became prime minister, Vajpayee has labelled the allegation of participation in the Quit India Movement to be a false rumour and that he never visited Bateshwar during Quit India Movement.

== Early political career (1947–1975) ==
In 1951, Vajpayee was seconded by the RSS, along with Deendayal Upadhyaya, to work for the newly formed Bharatiya Jana Sangh, a Hindu right-wing political party associated with the RSS. He was appointed as a national secretary of the party in charge of the Northern region, based in Delhi. He soon became a follower and aide of party leader Syama Prasad Mukherjee. In the 1957 Indian general election, Vajpayee contested elections to the Lok Sabha, the lower house of the Indian Parliament. He lost to Raja Mahendra Pratap in Mathura, but was elected from Balrampur.

He was influenced by Jawaharlal Nehru to the extent that he mirrored his style, diction, and tone of his speeches. Nehru's influence was also evident in Vajpayee's leadership. In the Lok Sabha his oratorial skills so impressed Prime Minister Nehru that he predicted that Vajpayee would someday become the prime minister of India. On the occasion of Nehru's death on 27 May 1964, Vajpayee termed him as "the orchestrator of the impossible and inconceivable" and likened him to Hindu god Rama.

Vajpayee's oratorial skills won him the reputation of being the most eloquent defender of the Jana Sangh's policies. After the death of Upadhyaya, the leadership of the Jana Sangh passed to Vajpayee. He became the national president of the Jana Sangh in 1968, running the party along with Nanaji Deshmukh, Balraj Madhok and L. K. Advani.

== Political philosophy ==
Analysts describe Vajpayee's political outlook as a synthesis of cultural nationalism, democratic pluralism, and pragmatic statecraft. His speeches frequently invoked India's long civilisational history, presenting national development as a moral and cultural project as much as a political one. Several scholars identify his approach as a conciliatory variant of Indian conservatism that sought to bring traditional cultural values into engagement with modern democratic governance. The Sangh's emphasis on self-cultivation and disciplined nation-building left a lasting mark on Vajpayee's early worldview. Civilisational nation-building narrative started by Vajpayee paved the roots of upcoming BJP Modi government's policies of India First, etc.

== Janata Party and the BJP (1975–1995) ==
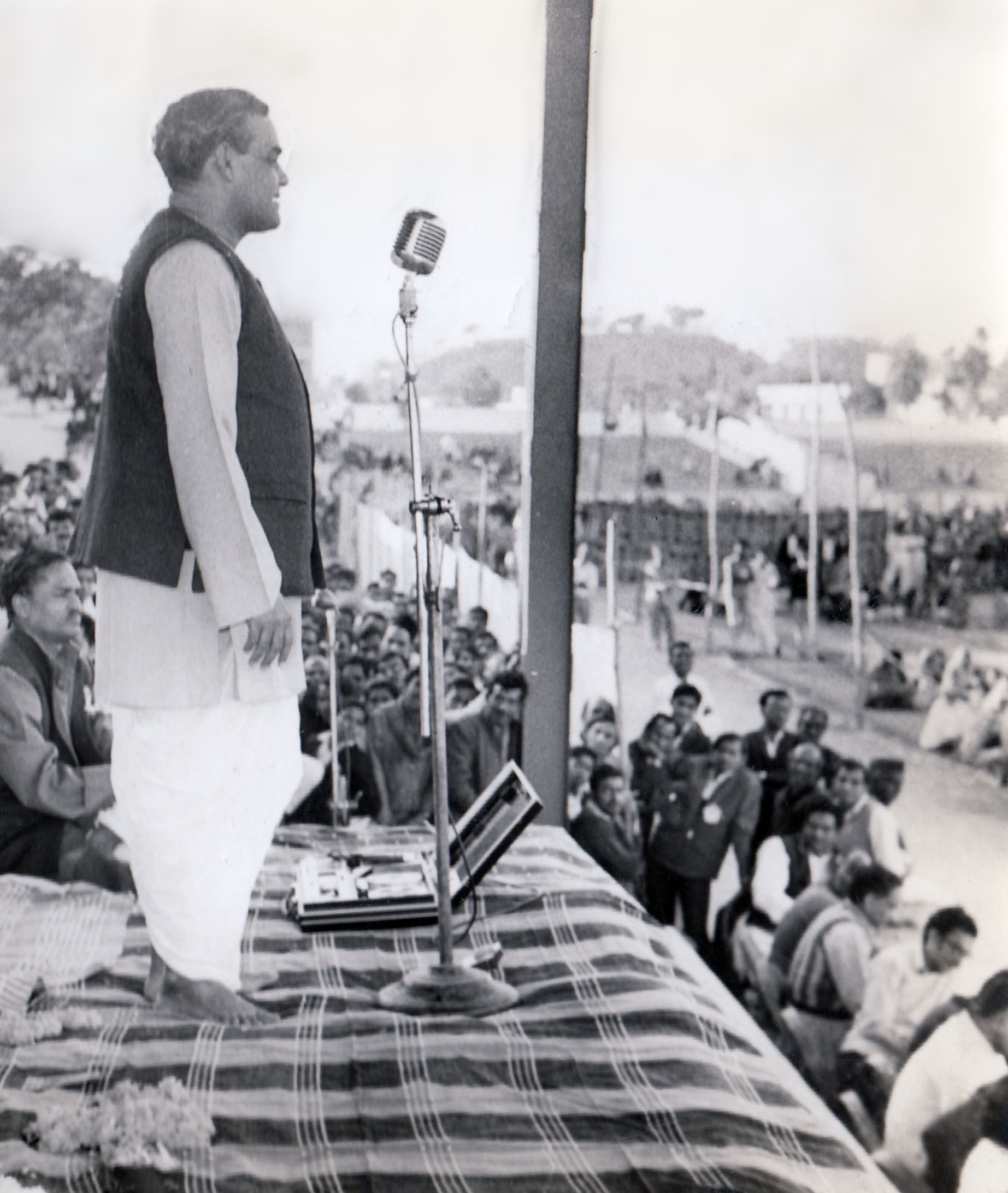
Vajpayee addressing a political rally in 1977.

Vajpayee was arrested along with several other opposition leaders during the Internal Emergency imposed by Prime Minister Indira Gandhi in 1975. Initially interned in Bangalore, Vajpayee appealed his imprisonment on the grounds of bad health, and was moved to a hospital in Delhi. In December 1976, Vajpayee ordered the student activists of the ABVP to tender an unconditional apology to Indira Gandhi for perpetrating violence and disorder. The ABVP student leaders refused to obey his order.

Gandhi ended the state of emergency in 1977. A coalition of parties, including the BJS, came together to form the Janata Party, which won the 1977 general elections. Morarji Desai, the chosen leader of the alliance, became the prime minister. Vajpayee served as the minister of external affairs, or foreign minister, in Desai's cabinet. As foreign minister, Vajpayee became the first person in 1977 to deliver a speech to the United Nations General Assembly in Hindi.

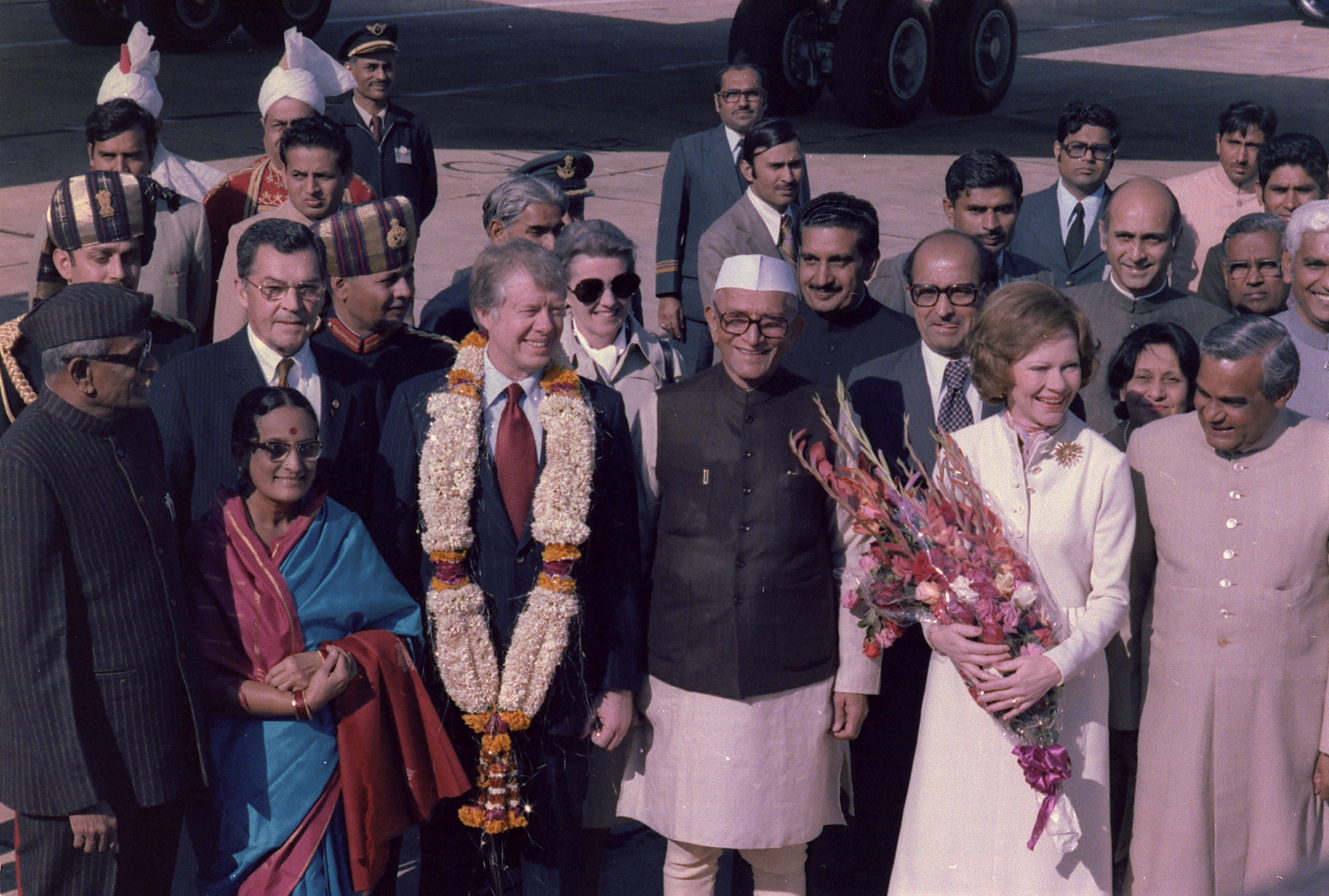
Foreign Minister Vajpayee (far right), President Neelam Sanjiva Reddy (far left) and Prime Minister Morarji Desai (third from right, front row) with US President Jimmy Carter during his 1978 visit to India.

In 1979, Desai and Vajpayee resigned, triggering the collapse of the Janata Party. The erstwhile members of the Bharatiya Jana Sangh came together to form the Bharatiya Janata Party (BJP) in 1980, with Vajpayee as its first President.

Leading up to Operation Bluestar, there were several protests by Sangh Parivar, including a march led by LK Advani and Vajpayee of the Bhartiya Janta Party to protest against the lack of government action and to demand that the Indian Army be sent into the Golden Temple.

The 1984 general elections were held in the wake of Prime Minister Indira Gandhi's assassination by her Sikh bodyguards. While he had won the 1977 and the 1980 elections from New Delhi, Vajpayee shifted to his home town Gwalior for the election.

Vidya Razdan was initially tipped to be the Congress candidate. Instead, Madhavrao Scindia, scion of the Gwalior royal family, was brought in on the last day of filing nominations. Vajpayee lost to Scindia, managing to secure only 29% of the votes.

Under Vajpayee, the BJP moderated the Hindu-nationalist position of the Jana Sangh, emphasising its connection to the Janata Party and expressing support for Gandhian Socialism. The ideological shift did not bring it success and Indira Gandhi's assassination generated sympathy for the Congress, leading to a massive victory at the polls. The BJP won only two seats in parliament. Vajpayee offered to quit as party president following BJP's dismal performance in the election, but stayed in the post until 1986. He was elected to the Rajya Sabha in 1986 from Madhya Pradesh, and was briefly the leader of the BJP in Parliament.

In 1986, L. K. Advani took office as president of the BJP. Under him, the BJP returned to a policy of hardline Hindu nationalism. It became the political voice of the Ram Janmabhoomi Mandir Movement, which sought to build a temple dedicated to the Hindu deity Rama in Ayodhya. The temple would be built at a site believed to be the birthplace of Rama after demolishing a 16th-century mosque, called the Babri Masjid, which then stood there. The strategy paid off for the BJP; it won 86 seats in the Lok Sabha in the 1989 general election, making its support crucial to the government of V. P. Singh. In December 1992, a group of religious volunteers led by members of the BJP, the Rashtriya Swayamsevak Sangh (RSS) and the Vishwa Hindu Parishad (VHP), tore down the mosque.

He served as Member of Parliament, Lok Sabha, for various terms starting at Balrampur from 1957–1962. He served again from Balrampur from 1967–1971, then from Gwalior from 1971–1977, and then from New Delhi from 1977–1984. Finally, he served from Lucknow from 1991–2009.

== Prime minister (1996, 1998–99 and 1999–2004) ==
=== First term: May 1996 ===
During a BJP conference in Mumbai in November 1995, BJP President Advani declared that Vajpayee would be the party's prime ministerial candidate in the forthcoming elections. Vajpayee himself was reported to be unhappy with the announcement, responding by saying that the party needed to win the election first. The BJP became the single largest party in Parliament in the 1996 general election, helped by religious polarisation across the country as a result of the demolition of the Babri Masjid. Indian president Shankar Dayal Sharma invited Vajpayee to form the government. Vajpayee was sworn in as the 10th prime minister of India, but the BJP failed to muster a majority among members of the Lok Sabha. Vajpayee resigned after 16 days, when it became clear that he did not have enough support to form a government.

=== Second term: 1998–1999 ===
After the fall of the two United Front governments between 1996 and 1998, the Lok Sabha was dissolved and fresh elections were held. The 1998 general elections again put the BJP ahead of others. A number of political parties joined the BJP to form the National Democratic Alliance (NDA), and Vajpayee was sworn in as the prime minister. The coalition was an uneasy one, as apart from the Shiv Sena, none of the other parties espoused the BJP's Hindu-nationalist ideology. Vajpayee has been credited for managing this coalition successfully, while facing ideological pressure from the hardline wing of the party and from the RSS. Vajpayee's government lasted 13 months until mid-1999 when the All India Anna Dravida Munnetra Kazhagam (AIADMK) under J. Jayalalithaa withdrew its support after a tea with Sonia Gandhi. The government lost the ensuing vote of confidence motion in the Lok Sabha by a single vote on 17 April 1999. As the opposition was unable to come up with the numbers to form the new government, the Lok Sabha was again dissolved and fresh elections were held.

==== Nuclear tests ====
In May 1998, India conducted five underground nuclear tests in the Pokhran desert in Rajasthan, 24 years after its first nuclear test, operation Smiling Buddha in 1974. Two weeks later, Pakistan responded with its own nuclear tests making it the newest nation with declared nuclear capability. While some nations, such as France, endorsed India's right to defensive nuclear power, others including the United States, Canada, Japan, Britain and the European Union imposed sanctions on information, resources and technology to India. Vajpayee wrote letters to Bill Clinton, Boris Yeltsin, and other world leaders explaining why India conducted the nuclear tests. In spite of intense international criticism and steady decline in foreign investment and trade, the nuclear tests were popular domestically. In effect, the international sanctions imposed failed to sway India from weaponising its nuclear capability. US sanctions against India and Pakistan were eventually lifted after just six months. Several commentators interpreted the tests as an assertion of strategic autonomy and national self-confidence, consistent with Vajpayee's view of India as a civilisational state entitled to a secure and independent global role. Srinath Raghavan notes international support India gained during and after the Kargil War.

==== Lahore summit ====
In late 1998 and early 1999, Vajpayee began a push for a full-scale diplomatic peace process with Pakistan. With the historic inauguration of the Delhi-Lahore bus service in February 1999, Vajpayee initiated a new peace process aimed towards permanently resolving the Kashmir dispute and other conflicts with Pakistan. The resultant Lahore Declaration espoused a commitment to dialogue, expanded trade relations and mutual friendship and envisaged a goal of denuclearised South Asia. This eased the tension created by the 1998 nuclear tests, not only within the two nations but also in South Asia and the rest of the world.

==== AIADMK's withdrawal from the NDA ====
The AIADMK had continually threatened to withdraw from the coalition and national leaders repeatedly flew down from Delhi to Chennai to pacify the AIADMK general secretary J. Jayalalithaa. However, in May 1999, the AIADMK withdrew from NDA, and the Vajpayee administration was reduced to a caretaker status pending fresh elections scheduled for October 1999.

==== Kargil War ====
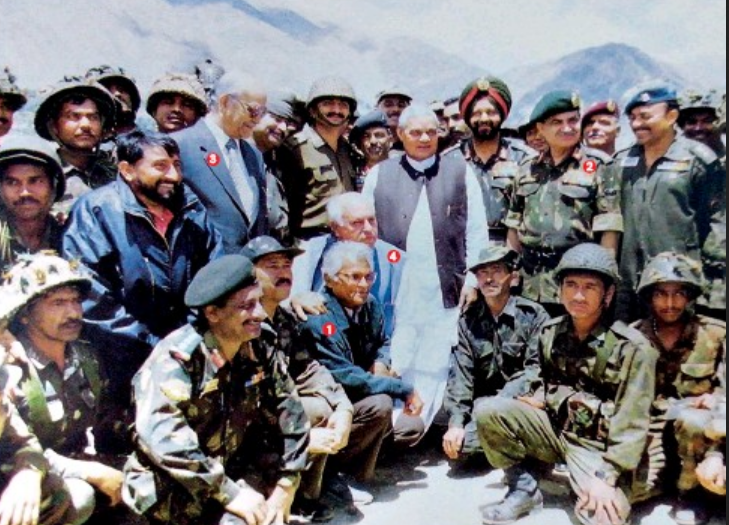
Prime Minister Vajpayee with Indian troops and other dignitaries at Kargil after the war in 1999

In May 1999 some Kashmiri shepherds discovered the presence of militants and non-uniformed Pakistani soldiers (many with official identifications and Pakistan Army's custom weaponry) in the Kashmir Valley, where they had taken control of border hilltops and unmanned border posts. The incursion was centred around the town of Kargil, but also included the Batalik and Akhnoor sectors and artillery exchanges at the Siachen Glacier.

The Indian army responded with Operation Vijay, which launched on 26 May 1999. This saw the Indian military fighting thousands of militants and soldiers in the midst of heavy artillery shelling and while facing extremely cold weather, snow and treacherous terrain at the high altitude. Over 500 Indian soldiers were killed in the three-month-long Kargil War, and it is estimated around 600–4,000 Pakistani militants and soldiers died as well. India pushed back the Pakistani militants and Northern Light Infantry soldiers. Almost 70% of the territory was recaptured by India. Vajpayee sent a "secret letter" to US President Bill Clinton that if Pakistani infiltrators did not withdraw from the Indian territory, "we will get them out, one way or the other".

After Pakistan suffered heavy losses, and with both the United States and China refusing to condone the incursion or threaten India to stop its military operations, General Pervez Musharraf was recalcitrant and Nawaz Sharif asked the remaining militants to stop and withdraw to positions along the LoC. The militants were not willing to accept orders from Sharif but the NLI soldiers withdrew. The militants were killed by the Indian army or forced to withdraw in skirmishes which continued even after the announcement of withdrawal by Pakistan.

Analysts highlighted Vajpayee's leadership during the conflict as balancing military firmness with diplomatic restraint, contributing to India's ability to maintain international support while defending its territorial integrity.

=== Third term: 1999–2004 ===
The 1999 general elections were held in the aftermath of the Kargil operations. The BJP-led NDA won 303 seats out of the 543 seats in the Lok Sabha, securing a comfortable and stable majority. On 13 October 1999, Vajpayee took oath as the prime minister of India for the third time.

A national crisis emerged in December 1999, when Indian Airlines flight IC 814 from Kathmandu to New Delhi was hijacked by five terrorists and flown to Taliban-ruled Afghanistan. The hijackers made several demands including the release of certain terrorists like Masood Azhar from prison. Under pressure, the government ultimately caved in. Jaswant Singh, the then minister of external affairs, flew with the terrorists to Afghanistan and exchanged them for the passengers. This time, he created Ministry of Statistics and Programme Implementation.

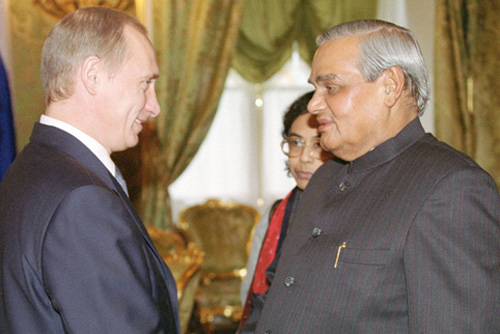
Vajpayee with Russian president Vladimir Putin on 6 November 2001

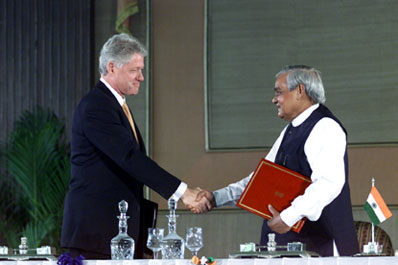
Vajpayee meeting US president Bill Clinton at the Hyderabad House on 21 March 2000

In March 2000, Bill Clinton, the President of the United States, paid a state visit to India. This was the first state visit to India by a US president in 22 years, since President Jimmy Carter's visit in 1978. President Clinton's visit was hailed as a significant milestone in relations between the two nations. Vajpayee and Clinton had wide-ranging discussions on bilateral, regional and international developments. The visit led to expansion in trade and economic ties between India and the United States. A vision document on the future course of Indo-US relations was signed during the visit.

Domestically, the BJP-led government was influenced by the RSS, but owing to its dependence on coalition support, it was impossible for the BJP to push items like building the Ram Janmabhoomi temple in Ayodhya, repealing Article 370 which gave a special status to the state of Kashmir, or enacting a uniform civil code applicable to adherents of all religions. On 17 January 2000, there were reports of the RSS and some BJP hard-liners threatening to restart the Jan Sangh, the precursor to the BJP, because of their discontent over Vajpayee's rule. Former president of the Jan Sangh Balraj Madhok had written a letter to the then-RSS chief Rajendra Singh for support. The BJP was, however, accused of "saffronising" the official state education curriculum and apparatus, saffron being the colour of the RSS flag of the RSS, and a symbol of the Hindu nationalism movement. Home Minister L. K. Advani and the Human Resource Development Minister (now called Education Minister) Murli Manohar Joshi were indicted in the 1992 Babri Mosque demolition case for inciting a mob of activists. Vajpayee himself came under public scrutiny owing to his controversial speech one day prior to the mosque demolition.

These years were accompanied by infighting in the administration and confusion regarding the direction of government. Vajpayee's weakening health was also a subject of public interest, and he underwent a major knee-replacement surgery at the Breach Candy Hospital in Mumbai to relieve intense pressure upon his legs.

In March 2001, the Tehelka group released a sting operation video named Operation West End which showed BJP president Bangaru Laxman, senior army officers and NDA members accepting bribes from journalists posing as agents and businessmen. The Defence Minister George Fernandes was forced to resign following the Barak Missile scandal involving the botched supplies of coffins for the soldiers killed in Kargil, and the findings of an inquiry commission that the government could have prevented the Kargil invasion.

Vajpayee initiated talks with Pakistan and invited Pakistani president Pervez Musharraf to Agra for a joint summit. President Musharraf was believed to be the principal architect of the Kargil War in India. By accepting him as the President of Pakistan, Vajpayee chose to move forward leaving behind the Kargil War. But after three days of much fanfare, which included Musharraf visiting his birthplace in Delhi, the summit failed to achieve a breakthrough as President Musharraf declined to leave aside the issue of Kashmir.

==== 2001 attack on Parliament ====
On 13 December 2001, a group of masked, armed men with fake IDs stormed Parliament House in Delhi. The terrorists managed to kill several security guards, but the building was sealed off swiftly and security forces cornered and killed the men who were later proven to be Pakistan nationals. Vajpayee ordered Indian troops to mobilise for war, leading to an estimated 500,000 to 750,000 Indian soldiers positioned along the international border between India and Pakistan under Operation Parakram. Pakistan responded by mobilising its own troops along the border leading to the 2001-2002 military standoff. A terrorist attack on an army garrison in Kashmir in May 2002 further escalated the situation. As the threat of war between two nuclear capable countries and the consequent possibility of a nuclear exchange loomed large, international diplomatic mediation focused on defusing the situation. In October 2002, both India and Pakistan announced that they would withdraw their troops from the border.

The Vajpayee administration brought in the Prevention of Terrorism Act in 2002. The act was aimed at curbing terrorist threats by strengthening powers of government authorities to investigate and act against suspects. It was passed in a joint session of the parliament, amidst concerns that the law would be misused.

Another political disaster hit his government between December 2001 and March 2002 with the VHP and the Government engaging in a major standoff in Ayodhya over the Ram temple. On the 10th anniversary of the destruction of the Babri mosque, the VHP wanted to perform a shila daan, or a ceremony laying the foundation stone of the cherished temple at the disputed site. Thousands of VHP activists amassed and threatened to overrun the site and forcibly perform the ceremony. A threat of communal violence and breakdown of law and order owing to the defiance of the government by a religious organisation hung over the nation. The incident, however, ended peacefully with a symbolic handover of a stone at a different location 1 km away from the disputed site.

=== National security and major crises (1998–2004) ===
Vajpayee's tenure was marked by several major national-security crises arising from cross-border terrorism and Pakistan's military strategy. Within weeks of his taking office, the government authorised a series of nuclear tests at Pokhran in May 1998, publicly affirming India's nuclear-weapons status and leading to a subsequent shift in regional deterrence dynamics. In 1999, India confronted the Kargil intrusion, in which Pakistan Army troops and Pakistan-backed militants occupied positions on the Indian side of the Line of Control. The conflict required high-altitude military operations and resulted in India restoring control over the occupied heights. Scholarly assessments describe the Kargil conflict as an attempt by Pakistan to unilaterally alter the territorial status quo under the cover of nuclear deterrence. Despite Vajpayee's outreach at the Lahore Summit (1999), cross-border terrorism intensified. India experienced a series of high-casualty attacks in Jammu and Kashmir, targeting civilians, pilgrims and security personnel. The most serious incident occurred on 13 December 2001, when militants belonging to Pakistan-based jihadist organisations attacked the Indian Parliament complex. The assault, aimed at the core of India's constitutional system, triggered Operation Parakram (2001–02), one of the largest military mobilisations in post-Independence history. The mobilisation brought India and Pakistan close to open war and prompted a reassessment of India's defensive and offensive doctrines. Vajpayee's later term also witnessed further terrorist strikes, including the 2002 Kaluchak massacre in Jammu and Kashmir and attacks on security installations. Analysts note that the period was defined by the dual challenge of managing nuclear-era strategic stability while confronting persistent state-sponsored terrorism.

==== 2002 Gujarat violence ====
In February 2002, a train filled with Hindu pilgrims returning to Gujarat from Ayodhya stopped in the town of Godhra. A scuffle broke out between Hindu activists and Muslim residents, and the train was set on fire, leading to the deaths of 59 people. The charred bodies of the victims were displayed in public in the city of Ahmedabad, and the Vishwa Hindu Parishad called for a statewide strike in Gujarat. These decisions stoked anti-Muslim sentiments. Blaming Muslims for the deaths, rampaging Hindu mobs killed thousands of Muslim men and women, destroying Muslim homes and places of worship. The violence raged for more than two months, and more than 1,000 people died. Gujarat was being ruled by a BJP government, with Narendra Modi as the chief minister. The state government was criticised for mishandling the situation. It was accused of doing little to stop the violence, and even being complicit in encouraging it.

Vajpayee reportedly wanted to remove Modi but was eventually prevailed upon by party members to not act against him. He travelled to Gujarat, visiting Godhra, and Ahmedabad, the site of the most violent riots. He announced financial aid for victims and urged an end to the violence. While he condemned the violence, he did not chastise Modi directly in public. When asked as to what his message to the chief minister in the event of the riots would be, Vajpayee responded that Modi must follow raj dharma, Hindi for ethical governance.

At the meeting of the BJP national executive in Goa in April 2002, Vajpayee's speech generated controversy for its contents which included him saying: "Wherever Muslims live, they don't like to live in co-existence with others." The Prime Minister's Office stated that these remarks had been taken out of context. Vajpayee was accused of doing nothing to stop the violence, and later admitted mistakes in handling the events. K. R. Narayanan, then president of India, also blamed Vajpayee's government for failing to quell the violence. After the BJP's defeat in the 2004 general elections, Vajpayee admitted that not removing Modi had been a mistake.

==== Later years ====
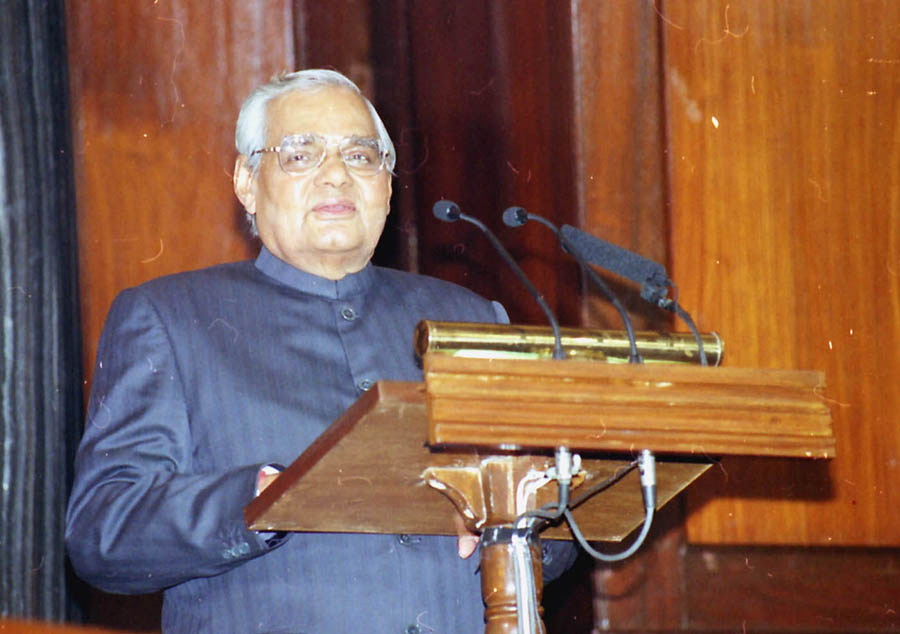
Prime Minister Vajpayee speaking at a special session to commemorate the 200th session of Rajya Sabha in 2003.

In late 2002 and 2003 the government pushed through economic reforms. Vajpayee's economic reforms and national renewal has been described well by Gurcharan Das. The country's GDP growth exceeded 7% every year from 2003 to 2007, following three years of sub-5% growth. Increasing foreign investment, modernisation of public and industrial infrastructure, the creation of jobs, a rising high-tech and IT industry and urban modernisation and expansion improved the nation's international image. Good crop harvests and strong industrial expansion also helped the economy.

In May 2003, he announced before the parliament that he would make one last effort to achieve peace with Pakistan. The announcement ended a period of 16 months, following the 2001 attack on the Indian parliament, during which India had severed diplomatic ties with Pakistan. Although diplomatic relations did not pick up immediately, visits were exchanged by high-level officials and the military standoff ended. The Pakistani President and Pakistani politicians, civil and religious leaders hailed this initiative as did the leaders of the United States, Europe and much of the world. In July 2003, Prime Minister Vajpayee visited China and met with various Chinese leaders. He recognised Tibet as a part of China, which was welcomed by the Chinese leadership, and which, in the following year, recognised Sikkim as part of India. China–India relations improved greatly in the following years.

==== 2004 general election ====
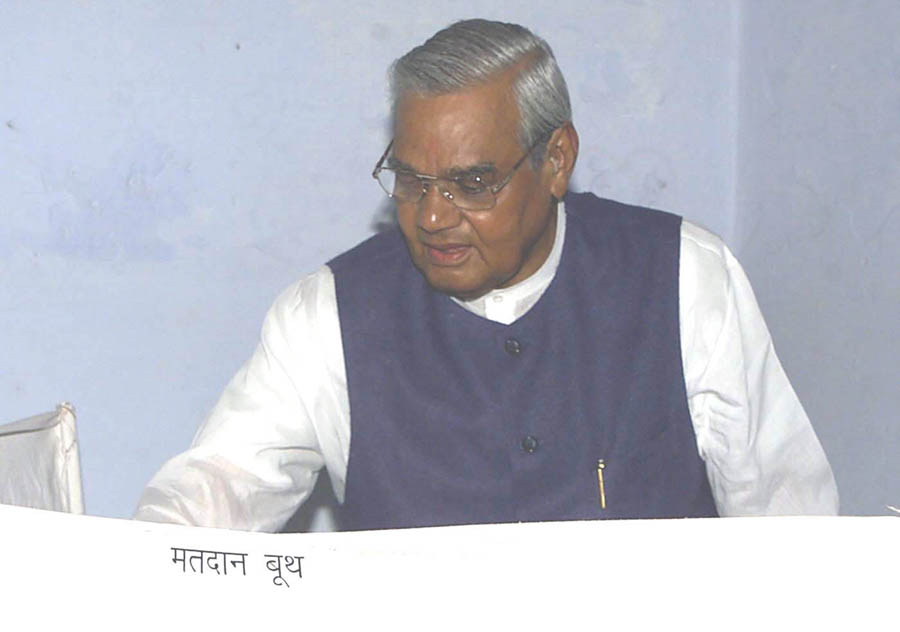
Prime Minister Vajpayee casting his vote at a polling booth in Lucknow, Uttar Pradesh, during the 2004 general election.

In 2003, news reports suggested a tussle within the BJP with regard to sharing of leadership between Vajpayee and Deputy Prime Minister LK Advani. BJP president Venkaiah Naidu had suggested that Advani must lead the party politically at the 2004 general elections, referring to Vajpayee as vikas purush, Hindi for development man, and Advani as loh purush, iron man. When Vajpayee subsequently threatened retirement, Naidu backtracked, announcing that the party would contest the elections under the twin leadership of Vajpayee and Advani.

The NDA was widely expected to retain power after the 2004 general election. It announced elections six months ahead of schedule, hoping to capitalise on economic growth, and Vajpayee's peace initiative with Pakistan. The 13th Lok Sabha was dissolved before the completion of its term. The BJP hoped to capitalise on a perceived 'feel-good factor' and BJP's recent successes in the Assembly elections in Rajasthan, Madhya Pradesh and Chhattisgarh. Under the "India Shining" campaign, it released ads proclaiming the economic growth of the nation under the government.

However, the BJP could only win 138 seats in the 543-seat parliament, with several prominent cabinet ministers being defeated. The NDA coalition won 185 seats. The Indian National Congress, led by Sonia Gandhi, emerged as the single largest party, winning 145 seats in the election. The Congress and its allies, comprising many smaller parties, formed the United Progressive Alliance, accounting for 220 seats in the parliament. Vajpayee resigned as prime minister. The UPA, with the outside support of communist parties, formed the next government with Manmohan Singh as the prime minister. Later, his aide Shiv Kumar Pareek revealed he didn't wanted earlier polls and sensed the defeat earlier.

=== Policies ===
Vajpayee's government introduced many domestic economic and infrastructural reforms, including encouraging the private sector and foreign investments, reducing governmental waste, encouraging research and development and privatisation of some government owned corporations. Among Vajpayee's projects were the National Highways Development Project and Pradhan Mantri Gram Sadak Yojana. In 2001, the Vajpayee government launched the Sarva Shiksha Abhiyan campaign, aimed at improving the quality of education in primary and secondary schools.

== Post-premiership ==
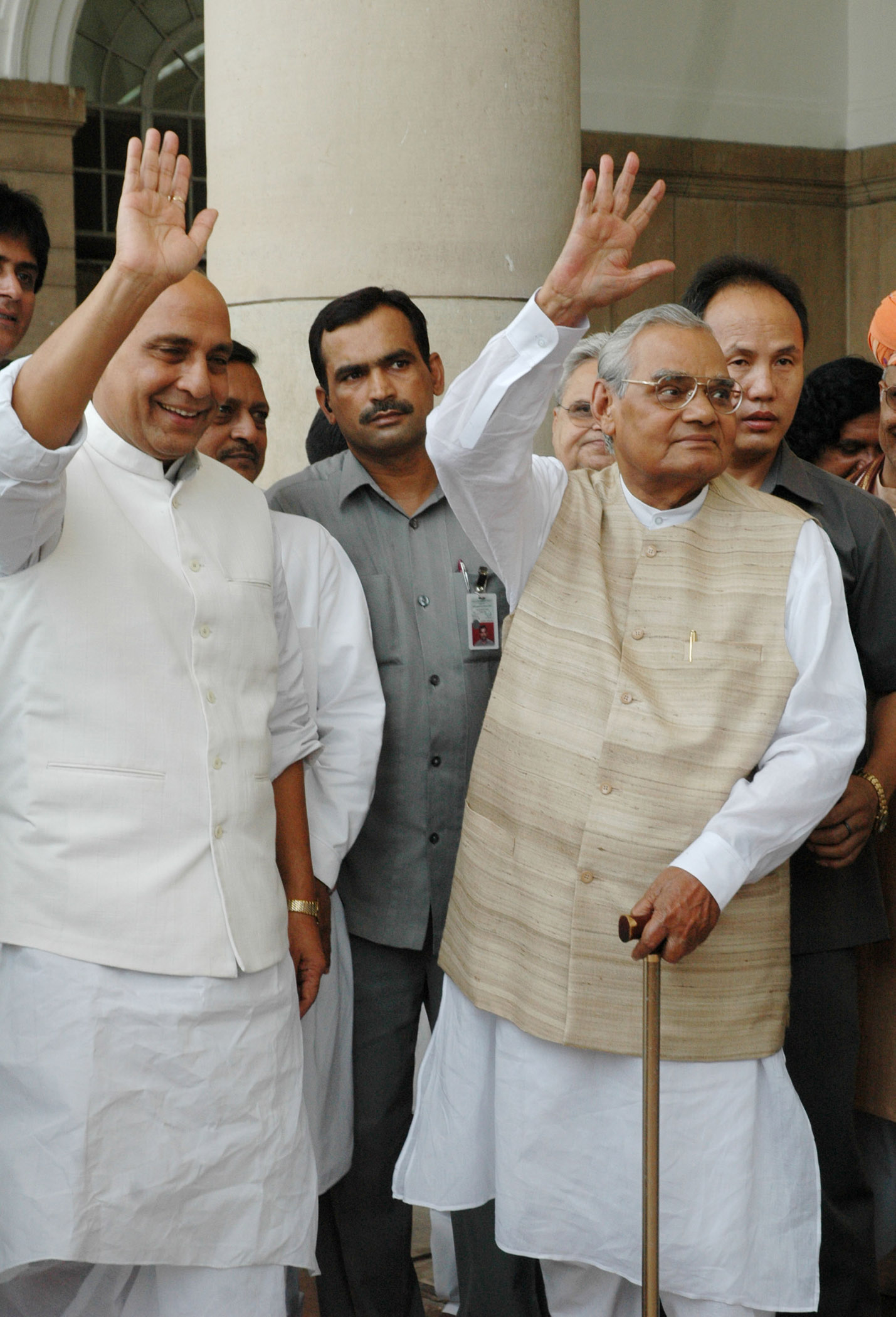
Vajpayee and Rajnath Singh (left) during the voting for 2007 Indian Presidential election

In December 2005, Vajpayee announced his retirement from active politics, declaring that he would not contest in the next general election. In a famous statement at the BJP's silver jubilee rally at Mumbai's Shivaji Park, Vajpayee announced that "Henceforth, Lal Krishna Advani and Pramod Mahajan will be the Ram-Lakshman [the two godly brothers much revered and worshipped by Hindus] of the BJP."

In 2007, Trinamool Congress leader Mamata Banerjee proposed his name for 2007 presidential polls, but he denied it. (Note: Earlier, in 2002 RSS wanted him as presidential candidate while during his primership)

Vajpayee was referred to as the Bhishma Pitamah of Indian politics by former prime minister Manmohan Singh during a speech in the Rajya Sabha, a reference to the character in the Hindu epic Mahabharata who was held in respect by two warring sides.

Vajpayee was hospitalised at All India Institute of Medical Sciences, Delhi (AIIMS) for a chest infection and fever on 6 February 2009. He was put on ventilator support as his condition worsened but he eventually recuperated and was later discharged. Unable to participate in the campaign for the 2009 general election due to his poor health, he wrote a letter urging voters to back the BJP. His protege Lalji Tandon was able to retain the Lucknow seat in that election even though the NDA suffered electoral reverses all over the country. It was speculated that Vajpayee's non-partisan appeal contributed to Lalji's success in Lucknow in contrast to that BJP's poor performance elsewhere in Uttar Pradesh.

== Positions held ==
Year	Position	Place	Party	Remark
1951	Founding-Member	Bharatiya Jana Sangh	Bharatiya Jana Sangh	
1957–1962	MP, Balrampur (Lok Sabha constituency)	2nd Lok Sabha	Bharatiya Jana Sangh	1st Term
1957–1977	Leader	Bharatiya Jana Sangh Parliamentary Party	Bharatiya Jana Sangh	
1962–1968	MP, Uttar Pradesh, Rajya Sabha	Rajya Sabha	Bharatiya Jana Sangh	1st Term (Resigned on 25 February 1967) Elected to Lok Sabha
1966–1967	Chairman	Committee on Government Assurances	Rajya Sabha	
1967	MP, Balrampur (Lok Sabha constituency)	4th Lok Sabha	Bharatiya Jana Sangh	2nd Term
1967–70	Chairman,	Public Accounts Committee	Bharatiya Jana Sangh	
1968–1973	President	Bharatiya Jana Sangh	Bharatiya Jana Sangh	
1971	MP, Gwalior (Lok Sabha constituency)	5th Lok Sabha	Bharatiya Jana Sangh	3rd Term
1977	MP, New Delhi (Lok Sabha constituency)	6th Lok Sabha (4th term)	Janata Party	(4th term)
1977–1979	Union Cabinet Minister,	External Affairs	Janata Party	
1977–1980	Founding Member	Janata Party	Janata Party	
1980	MP, New Delhi (Lok Sabha constituency)	7th Lok Sabha	Bharatiya Janata Party	(5th term)
1980–1986	President,	Bharatiya Janata Party	Bharatiya Janata Party	
1980–1984, 1986 and 1993–1996	Leader	Parliamentary Party	Bharatiya Janata Party	
1986	MP, Madhya Pradesh, Rajya Sabha	Rajya Sabha	Bharatiya Janata Party	2nd Term
1988–1989	Member,	General Purposes Committee	Rajya Sabha	
1988–1990	Member,	House Committee Member, Business Advisory Committee	Rajya Sabha	
1990–1991	Chairman,	Committee on Petitions	Rajya Sabha	
1991	MP, Lucknow (Lok Sabha constituency)	10th Lok Sabha	Bharatiya Janata Party	(6th term)
1991–1993	Chairman,	Public Accounts Committee	Lok Sabha	
1993–1996	Chairman,	Committee on External Affairs	Lok Sabha	
1993–1996	Leader of Opposition,	Lok Sabha	Bharatiya Janata Party	
1996	MP, Lucknow (Lok Sabha constituency)	11th Lok Sabha	Bharatiya Janata Party	7th Term
16 May 1996 – 31 May 1996	Prime Minister of India; and in charge of other subjects not allocated to any other Cabinet Minister	Bharatiya Janata Party	Bharatiya Janata Party	
1996–1997	Leader of Opposition,	Lok Sabha	Bharatiya Janata Party	
1997–1998	Chairman,	Committee on External Affairs	Lok Sabha	
1998	MP, Lucknow (Lok Sabha constituency)	12th Lok Sabha	Bharatiya Janata Party	8th Term
1998–1999	Prime Minister of India; Minister of External Affairs; and also incharge of Ministries/Departments not specifically allocated to the charge of any Minister	Bharatiya Janata Party	Bharatiya Janata Party	
1999	MP, Lucknow (Lok Sabha constituency)	13th Lok Sabha	Bharatiya Janata Party	9th Term
1999	Leader,	Parliamentary Party, Lok Sabha	Bharatiya Janata Party	
13 Oct.1999- May 2004	Prime Minister of India and also in charge of the Ministries/Departments not specifically allocated to the charge of any Minister	Bharatiya Janata Party	Bharatiya Janata Party	
2004	MP, Lucknow (Lok Sabha constituency)	14th Lok Sabha	Bharatiya Janata Party	10th Term
2004	Chairman,	Parliamentary Party	Bharatiya Janata Party & National Democratic Alliance (India)	

== Poetry ==
He was also a noted Hindi poet and a writer. His speeches and poetry are noted for blending political pragmatism with themes drawn from India's cultural and philosophical traditions. His published works include Kaidi Kaviraj Ki Kundalian, a collection of poems written during the 1975–1977 emergency, and Amar aag hai. With regard to his poetry he wrote

"My poetry is a declaration of war, not an exordium to defeat. It is not the defeated soldier's drumbeat of despair, but the fighting warrior's will to win. It is not the despirited voice of dejection but the stirring shout of victory."

== Personal life ==
Vajpayee remained a bachelor for his entire life. He adopted and raised Namita Bhattacharya as his own child, the daughter of longtime friend Rajkumari Kaul and her husband B. N. Kaul. His adopted family lived with him.

Unlike purist Brahmins who shun meat and alcohol, Vajpayee was known to be fond of whisky and meat. He was known for his oratory skills and poetry in Hindi.

== Illness and death ==
Vajpayee had a stroke in 2009 which impaired his speech. His health had been a major source of concern; reports said he was reliant on a wheelchair and failed to recognise people. He also had dementia and long-term diabetes. For many years, he had not attended any public engagements and rarely ventured out of the house, except for checkups at the All India Institutes of Medical Sciences.

On 11 June 2018, Vajpayee was admitted to AIIMS in critical condition following a kidney infection. He was officially declared dead there at 5:05 pm IST on 16 August 2018 at the age of 93. Some sources claim that he had died on the previous day. A seven-day state mourning was announced by the central government throughout India. The national flag flew half-mast during this period.

== Awards and honours ==
=== National honours ===
- India:
  - Bharat Ratna (27 March 2015)
  - Padma Vibhushan (1992)

=== Foreign honours ===
- Morocco:
  - Order of Ouissam Alaouite, Grand Cordon (13 February 1999)
- Bangladesh:
  - Bangladesh Liberation War Honour (7 June 2015)

=== Honorary degrees ===
- (India) Kanpur University
  - Doctor of Letters (D. Lit.) (1993)
- (Russia) Moscow State University
  - Doctor of Letters (D.Lit.)

(2001)

- (India) Madhya Pradesh Bhoj Open University
  - Doctor of Letters (D.Lit.)

(2015)

=== Honorary awards ===
- 1994, Lokmanya Tilak National Award
- 1994, Pandit Govind Ballabh Pant Award

=== Competitive awards ===
- 2000, Screen Award for Best Non-Film Lyrics – Nayi Disha

=== Recognition ===
- In 2001, Vajpayee was named " Asian Statesman of the year" by Harvard University India Caucus.
- In 2004, Vajpayee was named one of the 100 Most Influential Persons by the Time Magazine.
- In 2012, Vajpayee was ranked number 9 in The Greatest Indian poll by Outlook magazine in partnership with CNN-IBN and The History Channel, that ranked personalities from modern India.
- In August 2018, Naya Raipur was renamed as Atal Nagar.
- In October 2018, four Himalayan peaks near Gangotri Glacier; Atal I, Atal II, Atal III, and Atal IV were named after him.

== Published works ==
Vajpayee authored several works of both Hindi poetry and prose. Some of his major publications are listed below. In addition to these, various collections were made of his speeches, articles, and slogans.

=== Prose ===
- National Integration (1961)
- New Dimensions of India's Foreign Policy (1979)
- Gathbandhan Ki Rajniti
- Kuchh Lekh, Kuchh Bhashan (1996)
- Bindu-Bindu Vichar (1997)
- Decisive Days (1999)
- Sankalpakal (1999)
- Vichar-Bindu (Hindi Edition, 2000)
- India's Perspectives on ASEAN and the Asia-Pacific Region (2003)
- Na Dainyam Na Palayanam
- Nayi Chunauti : Naya Avasar

=== Poetry ===
- Qaidi Kaviraj Ki Kundaliyan
- Amar Aag Hai (1994)
- Meri Ikyavan Kavitaen (1995) Some of these poems were set to music by Jagjit Singh for his album Samvedna.
- Kya Khoya Kya Paya: Atal Bihari Vajapeyi, Vyaktitva Aur Kavitaen (1999)
- Values, Vision & Verses of Vajpayee: India's Man of Destiny (2001)
- Twenty-One Poems (2003)
- Chuni Hui Kavitaen (2012)

An English translation of a selection of some of Vajpayee's Hindi poetry was published in 2013.Literary critics have noted that his poetry reflects themes of moral optimism, duty, and civilisational continuity, which also shaped his public life.

== Legacy ==
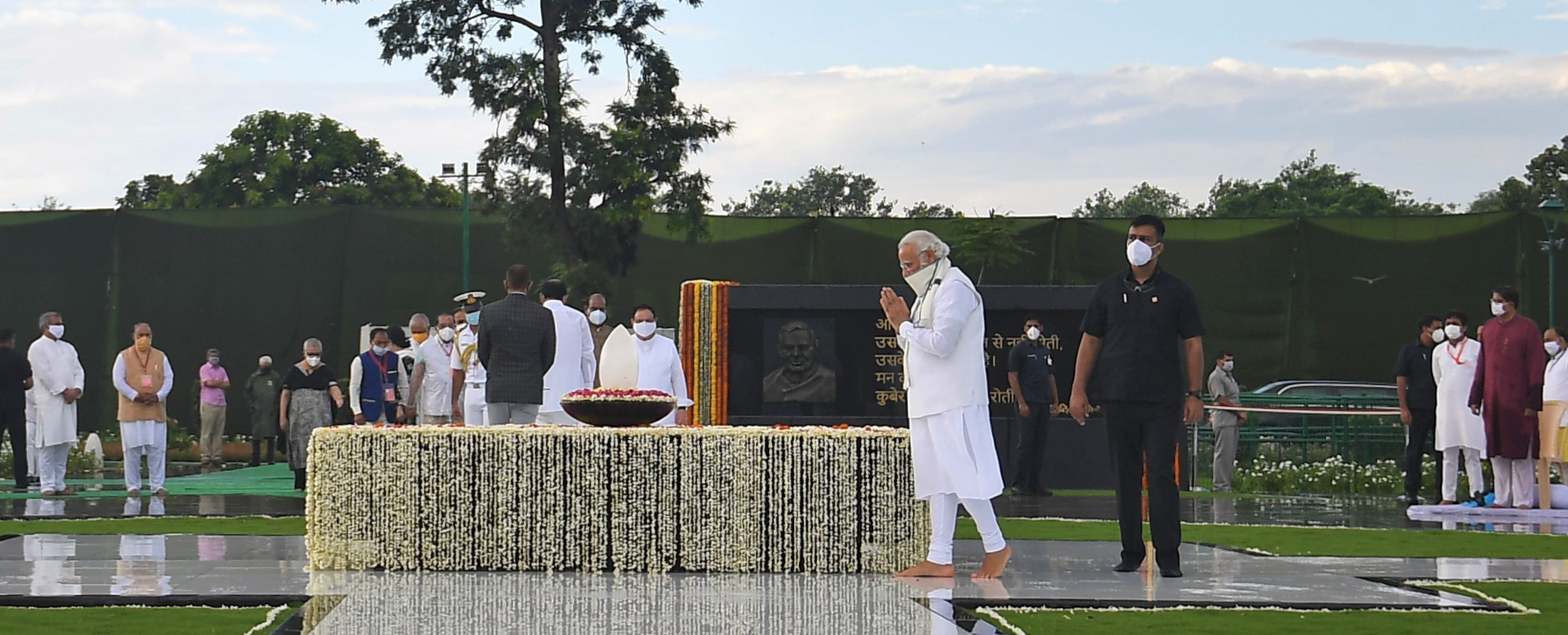
Prime Minister Modi at Vajpayee's memorial, Sadaiv Atal

The administration of Narendra Modi declared in 2014 that Vajpayee's birthday, 25 December, would be marked as Good Governance Day. The world's longest tunnel above 10,000 ft (3,000 m), Atal Tunnel at Rohtang, Himachal Pradesh, on the Leh-Manali Highway was named after Atal Bihari Vajpayee. The third longest cable-stayed bridge in India over the Mandovi River, Atal Setu was named in his memory. The Government of Chhattisgarh changed the name of Naya Raipur to Atal Nagar. Several national and regional educational institutions have also been named after him including Atal Bihari Vajpayee Hindi Vishwavidyalaya in Bhopal, Madhya Pradesh, Atal Bihari Vajpayee Medical University in Lucknow, Uttar Pradesh, Atal Bihari Vajpayee Vishwavidyalaya in Bilaspur, Chhattisgarh, Atal Medical and Research University in Mandi, Himachal Pradesh, and ABV-IIITM in Gwalior, Madhya Pradesh.

Vajpayee's legacy is frequently discussed in the context of India's evolving civilisational politics. Commentators argue that he broadened the appeal of cultural nationalism by combining it with consensual politics, parliamentary decorum, and a commitment to democratic institutions. His rhetorical style and poetry continue to be cited as expressions of a vision of India that integrates modern governance with cultural self-awareness. His tenure is often described as laying the institutional foundations for later political articulations of Indian cultural identity, making him a central figure in the long-term evolution of conservative and nationalist thought in India. Jaswant Singh has provided an insider's perspective by describing Vajpayee's role in cultural nationalism. Mainstream media often connect Vajpayee to infrastructure vision for years to come.

Much of the later portrayal of Vajpayee as a conciliatory or centrist figure reflects the interpretive frameworks of writers uncomfortable with acknowledging the cultural-nationalist roots of his politics. These portrayals do not alter the documentary evidence of his lifelong ideological alignment within the RSS tradition.Vajpayee's political formation lay entirely within the cultural-nationalist tradition of the Rashtriya Swayamsevak Sangh (RSS), whose ideological vocabulary and organisational discipline shaped his public life from adolescence onward. His emergence as a national leader therefore reflected the maturation of this cultural-nationalist current in Indian politics rather than any departure from it. Later commentators have variously approved or disapproved of this fact—often interpreting his style through their own political frameworks—but the historical record consistently situates him within the trajectory of Hindu cultural nationalism. Many editorial tributes in the vernacular press have been more complimentary describing Vajpayee as a Mahaan (transl. Great) leader.

== In popular culture ==
The Films Division of India has produced the short documentary films Pride of India Atal Bihari Vajpayee (1998) and Know Your Prime Minister Atal Behari Vajpayee (2003), both directed by Girish Vaidya, which explore different facets of his personality. Vajpayee also appears in a cameo in the 1977 Indian Hindi-language film Chala Murari Hero Banne by Asrani.

Aap Ki Adalat, an Indian talk show which airs on India TV, featured an interview with Vajpayee just before the 1999 elections. Pradhanmantri (lit. 'Prime Minister'), a 2013 Indian documentary television series which aired on ABP News and covers the various policies and political tenures of Indian PMs, includes the tenureship of Vajpayee in the episodes "Atal Bihari Vajpayee's 13 days government and India during 1996–98", "Pokhran-II and Kargil War", and "2002 Gujarat Riots and Fall of Vajpayee Government".

Abhishek Choudhary wrote an original portrait of Hindutva's first prime minister in VAJPAYEE: The Ascent of the Hindu Right, 1924–1977. The book won the 2023 Tata Literature Live! First Book Award.

In 2019, Shiva Sharma and Zeeshan Ahmad, owners of Amaash Films, acquired the official rights of the book The Untold Vajpayee written by Ullekh N P, to make a biopic based on Vajpayee's life from his childhood, college life and finally turning into a politician.

Hindi-language film "Main Atal Hoon", starring Pankaj Tripathi as Vajpayee, was theatrically released in India on 19 January 2024.

== See also ==
- List of national presidents of the Bharatiya Janata Party
- List of Ig Nobel Prize winners
- List of Indian writers
- List of Padma Vibhushan award recipients
- List of longest-serving members of the Parliament of India

Lok Sabha
New constituency	Member of Parliament for Balrampur; 1957–1962	Succeeded by Subhadra Joshi
Preceded by Subhadra Joshi	Member of Parliament for Balrampur; 1967–1971	Succeeded by Chandra Bhal Mani Tiwari
Preceded by Ram Awtar Sharma	Member of Parliament for Gwalior; 1971–1977	Succeeded by Narain Krishna Rao Shejwalker
Preceded by Mukul Banerjee	Member of Parliament for New Delhi; 1977–1984	Succeeded by Krishan Chandra Pant
Preceded by Mandhata Singh	Member of Parliament for Lucknow; 1991–2009	Succeeded by Lalji Tandon
Party political offices
Preceded by Deendayal Upadhyaya	President of Akhil Bharatiya Jana Sangh; 1968–1972	Succeeded by L. K. Advani
New political party	President of the Bharatiya Janata Party; 1980–1986	Succeeded by L. K. Advani
Political offices
Preceded by Yashwantrao Chavan	Minister of External Affairs; 1977–79	Succeeded by Shyam Nandan Prasad Mishra
Preceded by P. V. Narasimha Rao	Prime Minister of India; 1996	Succeeded by H. D. Deve Gowda
Preceded by Inder Kumar Gujral	Prime Minister of India; 1998–2004	Succeeded by Manmohan Singh
