= List of longest-serving members of the Parliament of India =

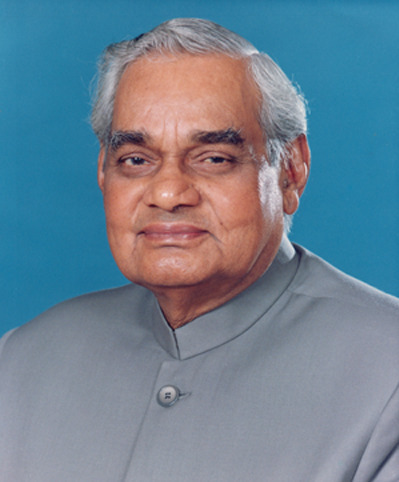
Atal Bihari Vajpayee, India's longest-ever serving Member of Parliament (tenure of 50 years, 3 months and 23 days), and also the longest-serving Lok Sabha MP (40 years, 6 months and 15 days in that house).

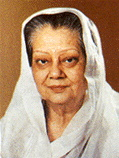
Vijaya Raje Scindia, the longest-serving female member of the Parliament of India (36 years, 6 months and 19 days).

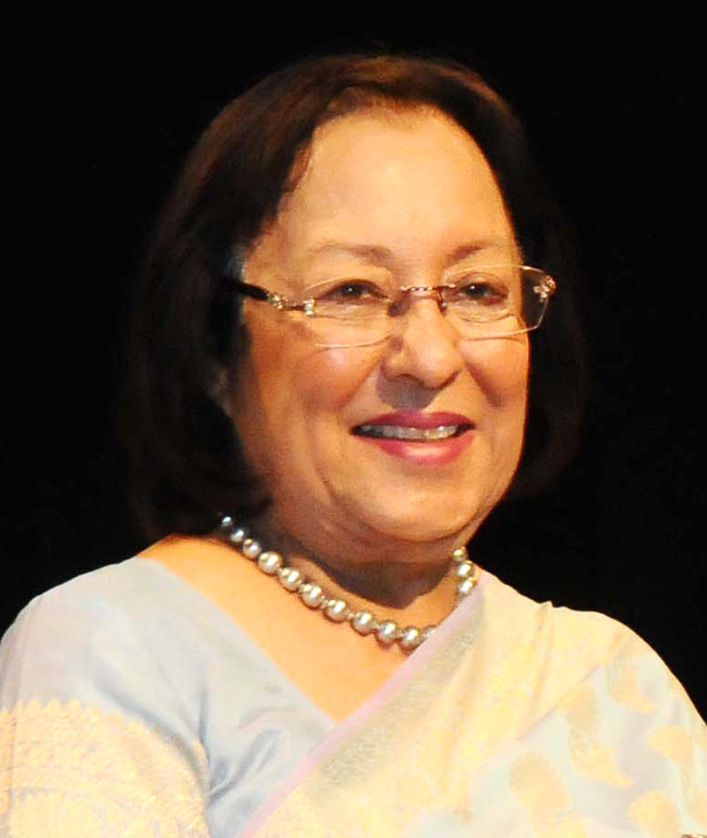
Najma Heptulla, the longest-serving Rajya Sabha MP (34 years, 2 months and 29 days).

The following is a list of the longest-serving members of the Parliament of India with overall tenures in office totaling at least 30 years. The present bicameral Parliament is a continuation of the unicameral Provisional Parliament established on 26 January 1950. Parliamentarians with service in the Provisional Parliament of India (26 January 1950–5 March 1952), the Rajya Sabha and the Lok Sabha (from 1952) are included.

Tenures begin from the date the respective member initially took their oath or affirmation of office, and end with either the dissolution date of that Lok Sabha or with the date the member vacated their seat. If two members have tenures of identical length, they are ranked by seniority in the order they took their seats in a given chamber, where applicable. Unless otherwise referenced, dates are from the official websites and records of the respective parliamentary debates.

== List ==
Key

- ^{†} Died in office

#	Member	Portrait	Party affiliations (Note: Listed dates cover the period the respective individual held party membership during their parliamentary service, not necessarily when the member joined or left their party.)	House of Parliament (constituencies/states represented) (Note: For uninterrupted tenures, listed chronologically when the MP represented more than one constituency or state during that period.)	Start of tenure	End of tenure	Time in office	Overall tenure
1	Atal Bihari Vajpayee (1924 – 2018)		BJS (1957–1977); JP (1977–1980); BJP (1980–2009)	Lok Sabha (Balrampur)	10 May 1957	31 March 1962	4 years, 10 months and 21 days	50 years, 3 months and 23 days
1	Atal Bihari Vajpayee (1924 – 2018)		BJS (1957–1977); JP (1977–1980); BJP (1980–2009)	Rajya Sabha (Uttar Pradesh)	17 April 1962	25 February 1967 (Note: Resigned upon election to Lok Sabha.)	4 years, 10 months and 8 days	50 years, 3 months and 23 days
1	Atal Bihari Vajpayee (1924 – 2018)		BJS (1957–1977); JP (1977–1980); BJP (1980–2009)	Lok Sabha (Balrampur 1967–1971; Gwalior 1971–1977; New Delhi 1977–1984)	16 March 1967	31 December 1984	17 years, 9 months and 15 days	50 years, 3 months and 23 days
1	Atal Bihari Vajpayee (1924 – 2018)		BJS (1957–1977); JP (1977–1980); BJP (1980–2009)	Rajya Sabha (Madhya Pradesh)	17 July 1986	17 June 1991	4 years and 11 months	50 years, 3 months and 23 days
1	Atal Bihari Vajpayee (1924 – 2018)		BJS (1957–1977); JP (1977–1980); BJP (1980–2009)	Lok Sabha (Lucknow)	9 July 1991	18 May 2009	17 years, 10 months and 9 days	50 years, 3 months and 23 days
2	Lal Krishna Advani (b. 1927)		BJS (1970–1977); JP (1977–1980); BJP (1980–2019)	Rajya Sabha (Delhi, Gujarat, Madhya Pradesh)	3 April 1970	27 November 1989	19 years, 7 months and 24 days	46 years, 10 months and 24 days
2	Lal Krishna Advani (b. 1927)		BJS (1970–1977); JP (1977–1980); BJP (1980–2019)	Lok Sabha (New Delhi)	18 December 1989	16 January 1996 (Note: Resigned)	6 years and 29 days	46 years, 10 months and 24 days
2	Lal Krishna Advani (b. 1927)		BJS (1970–1977); JP (1977–1980); BJP (1980–2019)	Lok Sabha (Gandhinagar)	23 March 1998	24 May 2019	21 years, 2 months and 1 day	46 years, 10 months and 24 days
3	Tridib Chaudhuri (1911–1997)		RSP (1952–1984, 1987–1997)	Lok Sabha (Baharampur)	13 May 1952	31 December 1984	32 years, 7 months and 18 days	43 years and 12 days
3	Tridib Chaudhuri (1911–1997)		RSP (1952–1984, 1987–1997)	Rajya Sabha (West Bengal)	27 July 1987	21 December 1997 ^{†}	10 years, 4 months and 24 days	43 years and 12 days
4	Oscar Fernandes (1941–2021)		INC (1980–2021)	Lok Sabha (Udupi)	21 January 1980	4 December 1997	17 years, 10 months and 13 days	41 years, 1 month and 25 days
4	Oscar Fernandes (1941–2021)		INC (1980–2021)	Rajya Sabha (Karnataka)	1 June 1998	13 September 2021 ^{†}	23 years, 3 months and 12 days	41 years, 1 month and 25 days
5	Chandra Shekhar (1927–2007)		PSP (1962–1964); INC (1964–1969); INC (R) (1969–1975); Independent (1975–1977); JP (1977–1988); JD (1988–1990); SJP (R) (1990–2007)	Rajya Sabha (Uttar Pradesh)	17 April 1962	22 March 1977	14 years, 11 months and 5 days	40 years and 3 months
5	Chandra Shekhar (1927–2007)		PSP (1962–1964); INC (1964–1969); INC (R) (1969–1975); Independent (1975–1977); JP (1977–1988); JD (1988–1990); SJP (R) (1990–2007)	Lok Sabha (Ballia)	25 March 1977	31 December 1984	7 years, 9 months and 6 days	40 years and 3 months
5	Chandra Shekhar (1927–2007)		PSP (1962–1964); INC (1964–1969); INC (R) (1969–1975); Independent (1975–1977); JP (1977–1988); JD (1988–1990); SJP (R) (1990–2007)	Lok Sabha (Ballia)	19 December 1989	8 July 2007 ^{†}	17 years, 6 months and 19 days	40 years and 3 months
6	Ahmed Patel (1949–2020)		INC (1977–2020)	Lok Sabha (Bharuch)	25 March 1977	27 November 1989	12 years, 8 months and 2 days	39 years, 11 months and 7 days
6	Ahmed Patel (1949–2020)		INC (1977–2020)	Rajya Sabha (Gujarat)	20 August 1993	25 November 2020 ^{†}	27 years, 3 months and 5 days	39 years, 11 months and 7 days
7	Frank Anthony (1908 – 1993)		(Nominated Anglo-Indian)	Provisional Parliament (1950–1952); Lok Sabha (from 1952)	28 January 1950	18 January 1977	26 years, 11 months and 21 days	39 years, 2 months and 21 days
7	Frank Anthony (1908 – 1993)		(Nominated Anglo-Indian)	Provisional Parliament (1950–1952); Lok Sabha (from 1952)	21 January 1980	27 November 1989	9 years, 10 months and 6 days	39 years, 2 months and 21 days
7	Frank Anthony (1908 – 1993)		(Nominated Anglo-Indian)	Provisional Parliament (1950–1952); Lok Sabha (from 1952)	9 July 1991	3 December 1993 ^{†}	2 years, 4 months and 24 days	39 years, 2 months and 21 days
8	P. M. Sayeed (1941–2005)		INC (1967–1969, 1978–2005); INC (R) (1969–1978)	Lok Sabha (Lakshadweep)	16 March 1967	6 February 2004	36 years, 10 months and 21 days	38 years, 2 months and 23 days
8	P. M. Sayeed (1941–2005)		INC (1967–1969, 1978–2005); INC (R) (1969–1978)	Rajya Sabha (Delhi)	16 August 2004	18 December 2005 ^{†}	1 year, 4 months and 2 days	38 years, 2 months and 23 days
9	Karan Singh (b. 1931)		INC (1967–1969, 2000–2018); INC (R) (1969–1978); INC (U) (1978–1984); Independent (1984); JKNC (1996–1999)	Lok Sabha (Udhampur)	22 May 1967	31 December 1984	17 years, 7 months and 9 days	38 years, 2 months and 23 days
9	Karan Singh (b. 1931)		INC (1967–1969, 2000–2018); INC (R) (1969–1978); INC (U) (1978–1984); Independent (1984); JKNC (1996–1999)	Rajya Sabha (Jammu and Kashmir)	2 December 1996	12 August 1999	2 years, 8 months and 10 days	38 years, 2 months and 23 days
9	Karan Singh (b. 1931)		INC (1967–1969, 2000–2018); INC (R) (1969–1978); INC (U) (1978–1984); Independent (1984); JKNC (1996–1999)	Rajya Sabha (NCT Delhi)	23 February 2000	27 January 2018	17 years, 11 months and 4 days	38 years, 2 months and 23 days
10	Ram Jethmalani (1923 – 2019)		JP (1977–1984); JD (1988–1994); Independent (1994–2006); Nominated (2006–2009); Independent (2010–2016); RJD (2016–2019)	Lok Sabha (Bombay North West)	25 March 1977	31 December 1984	7 years, 9 months and 6 days	38 years, 1 month and 11 days
10	Ram Jethmalani (1923 – 2019)		JP (1977–1984); JD (1988–1994); Independent (1994–2006); Nominated (2006–2009); Independent (2010–2016); RJD (2016–2019)	Rajya Sabha (Karnataka 1988–1994; Maharashtra 1994–2006; Nominated 2006–2009)	25 April 1988	26 August 2009	21 years, 4 months and 1 day	38 years, 1 month and 11 days
10	Ram Jethmalani (1923 – 2019)		JP (1977–1984); JD (1988–1994); Independent (1994–2006); Nominated (2006–2009); Independent (2010–2016); RJD (2016–2019)	Rajya Sabha (Rajasthan)	26 July 2010	8 June 2016	5 years, 10 months and 13 days	38 years, 1 month and 11 days
10	Ram Jethmalani (1923 – 2019)		JP (1977–1984); JD (1988–1994); Independent (1994–2006); Nominated (2006–2009); Independent (2010–2016); RJD (2016–2019)	Rajya Sabha (Bihar)	18 July 2016	8 September 2019 ^{†}	3 years, 1 month and 21 days	38 years, 1 month and 11 days
11	Shibu Soren (1944–2025)		Independent (1980–1984); JMM (1984–2025)	Lok Sabha (Dumka)	21 January 1980	31 December 1984	4 years, 11 months and 10 days	37 years, 9 months and 13 days
11	Shibu Soren (1944–2025)		Independent (1980–1984); JMM (1984–2025)	Lok Sabha (Dumka)	18 December 1989	4 December 1997	7 years, 11 months and 16 days	37 years, 9 months and 13 days
11	Shibu Soren (1944–2025)		Independent (1980–1984); JMM (1984–2025)	Rajya Sabha (Bihar 1998–2000; Jharkhand 2000–2001)	16 July 1998	17 July 2001 (Note: Seat declared vacant)	3 years and 1 day	37 years, 9 months and 13 days
11	Shibu Soren (1944–2025)		Independent (1980–1984); JMM (1984–2025)	Rajya Sabha (Bihar 1998–2000; Jharkhand 2000–2001)	17 April 2002	2 June 2002	1 month and 16 days	37 years, 9 months and 13 days
11	Shibu Soren (1944–2025)		Independent (1980–1984); JMM (1984–2025)	Lok Sabha (Dumka)	15 July 2002	24 May 2019	16 years, 10 months and 9 days	37 years, 9 months and 13 days
11	Shibu Soren (1944–2025)		Independent (1980–1984); JMM (1984–2025)	Rajya Sabha (Jharkhand)	14 September 2020	4 August 2025 ^{†}	4 years, 10 months and 21 days	37 years, 9 months and 13 days
12	Indrajit Gupta (1919–2001)		CPI (1960–1977, 1980–2001)	Lok Sabha (Calcutta South West 1960–1967; Alipore 1967–1977)	1 August 1960	18 January 1977	16 years, 5 months and 17 days	37 years, 6 months and 17 days
12	Indrajit Gupta (1919–2001)		CPI (1960–1977, 1980–2001)	Lok Sabha (Basirhat 1980–1989; Medinipur 1989–2001)	21 January 1980	20 February 2001 ^{†}	21 years and 30 days	37 years, 6 months and 17 days
13	Kamal Nath (b. 1946)		INC (1980–2019)	Lok Sabha (Chhindwara)	21 January 1980	10 May 1996	16 years, 3 months and 19 days	37 years, 5 months and 19 days
13	Kamal Nath (b. 1946)		INC (1980–2019)	Lok Sabha (Chhindwara)	24 March 1998	24 May 2019	21 years and 2 months	37 years, 5 months and 19 days
14	Ghulam Nabi Azad (b. 1949)		INC (1980–1989, 1990–2021)	Lok Sabha (Washim)	21 January 1980	27 November 1989	9 years, 10 months and 6 days	37 years, 2 months and 27 days
14	Ghulam Nabi Azad (b. 1949)		INC (1980–1989, 1990–2021)	Rajya Sabha (Maharashtra)	9 April 1990	2 April 1996	5 years, 11 months and 24 days	37 years, 2 months and 27 days
14	Ghulam Nabi Azad (b. 1949)		INC (1980–1989, 1990–2021)	Rajya Sabha (Jammu and Kashmir)	2 December 1996	29 April 2006	9 years, 4 months and 27 days	37 years, 2 months and 27 days
14	Ghulam Nabi Azad (b. 1949)		INC (1980–1989, 1990–2021)	Rajya Sabha (Jammu and Kashmir)	16 February 2009	15 February 2021	11 years, 11 months and 30 days	37 years, 2 months and 27 days
15	Ram Vilas Paswan (1946–2020)		JP (1977–1980); LD (1980–1984); JD (1989–1999); JD (U) (1999–2000); LJP (2000–2020)	Lok Sabha (Hajipur)	25 March 1977	31 December 1984	7 years, 9 months and 6 days	37 years, 2 months and 22 days
15	Ram Vilas Paswan (1946–2020)		JP (1977–1980); LD (1980–1984); JD (1989–1999); JD (U) (1999–2000); LJP (2000–2020)	Lok Sabha (Hajipur 1989–1991, 1996–2009, 2014–2019; Rosera 1991–1996)	18 December 1989	18 May 2009	19 years and 5 months	37 years, 2 months and 22 days
15	Ram Vilas Paswan (1946–2020)		JP (1977–1980); LD (1980–1984); JD (1989–1999); JD (U) (1999–2000); LJP (2000–2020)	Lok Sabha (Hajipur 1989–1991, 1996–2009, 2014–2019; Rosera 1991–1996)	5 June 2014	24 May 2019	4 years, 11 months and 19 days	37 years, 2 months and 22 days
15	Ram Vilas Paswan (1946–2020)		JP (1977–1980); LD (1980–1984); JD (1989–1999); JD (U) (1999–2000); LJP (2000–2020)	Rajya Sabha (Bihar)	26 July 2010	16 May 2014	3 years, 9 months and 20 days	37 years, 2 months and 22 days
15	Ram Vilas Paswan (1946–2020)		JP (1977–1980); LD (1980–1984); JD (1989–1999); JD (U) (1999–2000); LJP (2000–2020)	Rajya Sabha (Bihar)	1 July 2019	8 October 2020 ^{†}	1 year, 3 months and 7 days	37 years, 2 months and 22 days
16	Pranab Mukherjee (1935–2020)		INC (R) (1969–1978); INC (1978–2012)	Rajya Sabha (West Bengal)	21 July 1969	9 July 1981	11 years, 11 months and 18 days	36 years, 10 months and 1 day
16	Pranab Mukherjee (1935–2020)		INC (R) (1969–1978); INC (1978–2012)	Rajya Sabha (West Bengal)	20 August 1993	13 May 2004	10 years, 8 months and 23 days	36 years, 10 months and 1 day
16	Pranab Mukherjee (1935–2020)		INC (R) (1969–1978); INC (1978–2012)	Rajya Sabha (Gujarat)	17 August 1981	13 August 1987	5 years, 11 months and 27 days	36 years, 10 months and 1 day
16	Pranab Mukherjee (1935–2020)		INC (R) (1969–1978); INC (1978–2012)	Lok Sabha (Jangipur)	2 June 2004	25 July 2012 (Note: Ceased to hold seat upon assuming office as President, per Clause 1, Article 59 of the Constitution.)	8 years, 1 month and 23 days	36 years, 10 months and 1 day
17	Bali Ram Bhagat (1922–2011)		INC (1950–1969, 1984–1989); INC (R) (1969–1977); INC (U) (1979–1981); IC (S) (1981–1984)	Provisional Parliament (1950–1952); Lok Sabha (from 1952) (Patna-cum-Shahabad 1952–1957, renamed Shahabad 1957)	28 January 1950	18 January 1977	26 years, 11 months and 21 days	36 years, 9 months and 27 days
17	Bali Ram Bhagat (1922–2011)		INC (1950–1969, 1984–1989); INC (R) (1969–1977); INC (U) (1979–1981); IC (S) (1981–1984)	Lok Sabha (Sitamarhi 1980–1984; Arrah 1984–1989)	21 January 1980	27 November 1989	9 years, 10 months and 6 days	36 years, 9 months and 27 days
18	Bhola Raut (1914–1995)		INC (1950–1969, 1980–1989); INC (R) (1969–1977)	Provisional Parliament (1950–1952); Lok Sabha (from 1952) (Bagaha)	28 January 1950	18 January 1977	26 years, 11 months and 21 days	36 years, 9 months and 27 days
18	Bhola Raut (1914–1995)		INC (1950–1969, 1980–1989); INC (R) (1969–1977)	Provisional Parliament (1950–1952); Lok Sabha (from 1952) (Bagaha)	21 January 1980	27 November 1989	9 years, 10 months and 6 days	36 years, 9 months and 27 days
19	Arjun Charan Sethi (1941–2020)		INC (R) (1971–1977); INC (1980–1984); JD (1991–1996); BJD (1998–2019)	Lok Sabha (Bhadrak)	19 March 1971	18 January 1977	5 years, 9 months and 30 days	36 years, 9 months and 12 days
19	Arjun Charan Sethi (1941–2020)		INC (R) (1971–1977); INC (1980–1984); JD (1991–1996); BJD (1998–2019)	Lok Sabha (Bhadrak)	21 January 1980	31 December 1984	4 years, 11 months and 10 days	36 years, 9 months and 12 days
19	Arjun Charan Sethi (1941–2020)		INC (R) (1971–1977); INC (1980–1984); JD (1991–1996); BJD (1998–2019)	Lok Sabha (Bhadrak)	9 July 1991	10 May 1996	4 years, 10 months and 1 day	36 years, 9 months and 12 days
19	Arjun Charan Sethi (1941–2020)		INC (R) (1971–1977); INC (1980–1984); JD (1991–1996); BJD (1998–2019)	Lok Sabha (Bhadrak)	23 March 1998	24 May 2019	21 years, 2 months and 1 day	36 years, 9 months and 12 days
20	Somnath Chatterjee (1929–2018)		CPI (M) (1971–2008); Independent (2008–2009)	Lok Sabha (Burdwan 1971–1977; Jadavpur 1977–1984)	19 March 1971	15 June 1984 (Note: Lost by-election.)	13 years, 2 months and 27 days	36 years, 7 months and 26 days
20	Somnath Chatterjee (1929–2018)		CPI (M) (1971–2008); Independent (2008–2009)	Lok Sabha (Bolpur)	19 December 1985	18 May 2009	23 years, 4 months and 29 days	36 years, 7 months and 26 days
21	Vijaya Raje Scindia (1919–2001)		INC (1957–1967); SWA (1967); BJS (1971–1977); JP (1977–1984); BJP (1984–1999)	Lok Sabha (Guna 1957–1962; Gwalior 1962–1967)	10 May 1957	6 March 1967	9 years, 9 months and 24 days	36 years, 6 months and 19 days
21	Vijaya Raje Scindia (1919–2001)		INC (1957–1967); SWA (1967); BJS (1971–1977); JP (1977–1984); BJP (1984–1999)	Lok Sabha (Bhind)	19 March 1971	18 January 1977	5 years, 9 months and 30 days	36 years, 6 months and 19 days
21	Vijaya Raje Scindia (1919–2001)		INC (1957–1967); SWA (1967); BJS (1971–1977); JP (1977–1984); BJP (1984–1999)	Rajya Sabha (Madhya Pradesh)	10 May 1978	27 November 1989	11 years, 6 months and 17 days	36 years, 6 months and 19 days
21	Vijaya Raje Scindia (1919–2001)		INC (1957–1967); SWA (1967); BJS (1971–1977); JP (1977–1984); BJP (1984–1999)	Lok Sabha (Guna)	18 December 1989	26 April 1999	9 years, 4 months and 8 days	36 years, 6 months and 19 days
22	Jagjivan Ram (1908 – 1986)		INC (1950–1969, 1980–1986); INC (R) (1969–1977); CFD (1977); JP (1977–1979)	Provisional Parliament (1950–1952); Lok Sabha (from 1952) (Shahabad South 1952–1957, renamed Sasaram from 1957)	28 January 1950	6 July 1986 ^{†}		36 years, 5 months and 8 days
23	Vidya Charan Shukla (1929–2013)		INC (1957–1969, 1980–1987, 1991–1996); INC (R) (1969–1977); JM (1987–1989); SJP(R) (1990–1991)	Lok Sabha (Balodabazar 1957–1962; Mahasamund 1962–1971; Raipur 1971–1977)	10 May 1957	18 January 1977	19 years, 8 months and 8 days	35 years, 11 months and 27 days
23	Vidya Charan Shukla (1929–2013)		INC (1957–1969, 1980–1987, 1991–1996); INC (R) (1969–1977); JM (1987–1989); SJP(R) (1990–1991)	Lok Sabha (Mahasamund 1980–1991; Raipur 1991–1996)	21 January 1980	10 May 1996	16 years, 3 months and 19 days	35 years, 11 months and 27 days
24	Ashoke Kumar Sen (1913–1996)		INC (1957–1969, 1980–1990); INC (R) (1969–1977); JD (1990–1996)	Lok Sabha (Calcutta North West)	10 May 1957	18 January 1977	19 years, 8 months and 8 days	35 years, 6 months and 8 days
24	Ashoke Kumar Sen (1913–1996)		INC (1957–1969, 1980–1990); INC (R) (1969–1977); JD (1990–1996)	Lok Sabha (Calcutta North West)	21 January 1980	27 November 1989	9 years, 10 months and 6 days	35 years, 6 months and 8 days
24	Ashoke Kumar Sen (1913–1996)		INC (1957–1969, 1980–1990); INC (R) (1969–1977); JD (1990–1996)	Rajya Sabha (West Bengal)	9 April 1990	2 April 1996	5 years, 11 months and 24 days	35 years, 6 months and 8 days
25	Mahendra Prasad (1940–2021)		INC (1980–1992); Nominated (1993–1994); JD (U) (2000–2021)	Lok Sabha (Jahanabad)	21 January 1980	31 December 1984	4 years, 11 months and 10 days	35 years, 3 months and 24 days
25	Mahendra Prasad (1940–2021)		INC (1980–1992); Nominated (1993–1994); JD (U) (2000–2021)	Rajya Sabha (Bihar)	31 January 1985	6 July 1992	7 years, 5 months and 6 days	35 years, 3 months and 24 days
25	Mahendra Prasad (1940–2021)		INC (1980–1992); Nominated (1993–1994); JD (U) (2000–2021)	Rajya Sabha (Bihar)	27 August 1993	24 November 1994	1 year, 2 months and 28 days	35 years, 3 months and 24 days
25	Mahendra Prasad (1940–2021)		INC (1980–1992); Nominated (1993–1994); JD (U) (2000–2021)	Rajya Sabha (Bihar)	17 April 2000	27 December 2021 ^{†}	21 years, 8 months and 10 days	35 years, 3 months and 24 days
26	Buta Singh (1934–2021)		SAD (1962–1967); INC (1967–1969, 1980–1998, 1999–2004); INC (R) (1969–1977); Independent (1998)	Lok Sabha (Moga 1962–1967; Ropar 1967–1977)	16 April 1962	18 January 1977	14 years, 9 months and 2 days	35 years, 3 months and 23 days
26	Buta Singh (1934–2021)		SAD (1962–1967); INC (1967–1969, 1980–1998, 1999–2004); INC (R) (1969–1977); Independent (1998)	Lok Sabha (Ropar 1980–1984; Jalore 1984–1989)	21 January 1980	27 November 1989	9 years, 10 months and 6 days	35 years, 3 months and 23 days
26	Buta Singh (1934–2021)		SAD (1962–1967); INC (1967–1969, 1980–1998, 1999–2004); INC (R) (1969–1977); Independent (1998)	Lok Sabha (Jalore)	9 July 1991	10 May 1996	4 years, 10 months and 1 day	35 years, 3 months and 23 days
26	Buta Singh (1934–2021)		SAD (1962–1967); INC (1967–1969, 1980–1998, 1999–2004); INC (R) (1969–1977); Independent (1998)	Lok Sabha (Jalore)	23 March 1998	6 February 2004	5 years, 10 months and 14 days	35 years, 3 months and 23 days
27	Ebrahim Sulaiman Sait (1922–2005)		IUML (1960–1996)	Rajya Sabha (Kerala)	6 April 1960	2 April 1966	5 years, 11 months and 27 days	35 years, 1 month and 21 days
27	Ebrahim Sulaiman Sait (1922–2005)		IUML (1960–1996)	Lok Sabha (Kozhikode 1967–1977; Manjeri 1977–1991; Ponnani 1991–1996)	16 March 1967	10 May 1996	29 years, 1 month and 24 days	35 years, 1 month and 21 days
28	Maragatham Chandrasekar (1917–2001)		INC (1952–1969, 1980–1996); INC (R) (1969–1977)	Lok Sabha (Tiruvallur 1952–1957; Mayuram 1962–1967)	13 May 1952	4 April 1957	4 years, 10 months and 22 days	34 years, 11 months and 29 days
28	Maragatham Chandrasekar (1917–2001)		INC (1952–1969, 1980–1996); INC (R) (1969–1977)	Lok Sabha (Tiruvallur 1952–1957; Mayuram 1962–1967)	16 April 1962	3 March 1967	4 years, 10 months and 15 days	34 years, 11 months and 29 days
28	Maragatham Chandrasekar (1917–2001)		INC (1952–1969, 1980–1996); INC (R) (1969–1977)	Rajya Sabha (Nominated (INC))	3 April 1970	4 February 1976	5 years, 10 months and 1 day	34 years, 11 months and 29 days
28	Maragatham Chandrasekar (1917–2001)		INC (1952–1969, 1980–1996); INC (R) (1969–1977)	Rajya Sabha (Nominated (INC))	3 April 1976	4 February 1982	5 years, 10 months and 1 day	34 years, 11 months and 29 days
28	Maragatham Chandrasekar (1917–2001)		INC (1952–1969, 1980–1996); INC (R) (1969–1977)	Rajya Sabha (Nominated (INC))	4 October 1982	29 December 1984	2 years, 2 months and 25 days	34 years, 11 months and 29 days
28	Maragatham Chandrasekar (1917–2001)		INC (1952–1969, 1980–1996); INC (R) (1969–1977)	Lok Sabha (Sriperumbudur)	15 January 1985	10 May 1996	11 years, 3 months and 25 days	34 years, 11 months and 29 days
29	Murasoli Maran (1934–2003)		DMK (1967–2003)	Lok Sabha (Madras South)	23 November 1967	18 January 1977	9 years, 1 month and 26 days	34 years, 7 months and 24 days
29	Murasoli Maran (1934–2003)		DMK (1967–2003)	Rajya Sabha (Tamil Nadu)	26 July 1977	24 July 1995	17 years, 11 months and 28 days	34 years, 7 months and 24 days
29	Murasoli Maran (1934–2003)		DMK (1967–2003)	Lok Sabha (Chennai North)	23 May 1996	23 November 2003 ^{†}	7 years and 6 months	34 years, 7 months and 24 days
30	P. Chidambaram (b. 1945)		INC (1985–1996, 2004–present); TMC(M) (1996–2001); CJP (2001–2004)	Lok Sabha (Sivaganga)	15 January 1985	26 April 1999	14 years, 3 months and 11 days	34 years, 5 months and 4 days (Note: As of 26 October 2026)
30	P. Chidambaram (b. 1945)		INC (1985–1996, 2004–present); TMC(M) (1996–2001); CJP (2001–2004)	Lok Sabha (Sivaganga)	2 June 2004	18 May 2014	9 years, 11 months and 16 days	34 years, 5 months and 4 days
30	P. Chidambaram (b. 1945)		INC (1985–1996, 2004–present); TMC(M) (1996–2001); CJP (2001–2004)	Rajya Sabha (Maharashtra)	18 July 2016	16 June 2022	5 years, 10 months and 29 days	34 years, 5 months and 4 days
30	P. Chidambaram (b. 1945)		INC (1985–1996, 2004–present); TMC(M) (1996–2001); CJP (2001–2004)	Rajya Sabha (Tamil Nadu)	18 July 2022	present	4 years, 3 months and 8 days	34 years, 5 months and 4 days
31	Basudeb Acharia (1942–2023)		CPI (M) (1980–2014)	Lok Sabha (Bankura)	21 January 1980	18 May 2014		34 years, 3 months and 27 days
32	Najma Heptulla (b. 1940)		INC (1980–2004); BJP (2004–2016)	Rajya Sabha (Maharashtra)	7 July 1980	10 June 2004	23 years, 11 months and 3 days	34 years, 2 months and 29 days
32	Najma Heptulla (b. 1940)		INC (1980–2004); BJP (2004–2016)	Rajya Sabha (Rajasthan)	5 July 2004	4 July 2010	5 years, 11 months and 29 days	34 years, 2 months and 29 days
32	Najma Heptulla (b. 1940)		INC (1980–2004); BJP (2004–2016)	Rajya Sabha (Madhya Pradesh)	24 April 2012	20 August 2016	4 years, 3 months and 27 days	34 years, 2 months and 29 days
33	Ram Gopal Yadav (b. 1946)		SP (1992–present)	Rajya Sabha (Uttar Pradesh)	8 July 1992	13 May 2004	11 years, 10 months and 5 days	34 years, 2 months and 15 days
33	Ram Gopal Yadav (b. 1946)		SP (1992–present)	Lok Sabha (Sambhal)	2 June 2004	26 November 2008	4 years, 5 months and 24 days	34 years, 2 months and 15 days
33	Ram Gopal Yadav (b. 1946)		SP (1992–present)	Rajya Sabha (Uttar Pradesh)	10 December 2008	present	17 years, 10 months and 16 days	34 years, 2 months and 15 days
34	Praful Patel (b. 1957)		INC (1991–1999); NCP (2000–present)	Lok Sabha (Bhandara)	10 July 1991	26 April 1999	7 years, 9 months and 16 days	33 years, 11 months and 7 days
34	Praful Patel (b. 1957)		INC (1991–1999); NCP (2000–present)	Rajya Sabha (Maharashtra)	18 April 2000	16 May 2009	9 years and 28 days	33 years, 11 months and 7 days
34	Praful Patel (b. 1957)		INC (1991–1999); NCP (2000–present)	Lok Sabha (Bhandara–Gondiya)	1 June 2009	18 May 2014	4 years, 11 months and 17 days	33 years, 11 months and 7 days
34	Praful Patel (b. 1957)		INC (1991–1999); NCP (2000–present)	Rajya Sabha (Maharashtra)	7 July 2014	27 February 2024	9 years, 7 months and 20 days	33 years, 11 months and 7 days
34	Praful Patel (b. 1957)		INC (1991–1999); NCP (2000–present)	Rajya Sabha (Maharashtra)	10 May 2024	present	2 years, 5 months and 16 days	33 years, 11 months and 7 days
35	S. S. Ahluwalia (b. 1951)		INC (1986–2000); BJP (2000–2024)	Rajya Sabha (Bihar)	17 July 1986	7 July 1998	11 years, 11 months and 20 days	33 years, 11 months and 6 days
35	S. S. Ahluwalia (b. 1951)		INC (1986–2000); BJP (2000–2024)	Rajya Sabha (Bihar 2000; Jharkhand 2000–2012)	17 April 2000	2 April 2012	11 years, 11 months and 16 days	33 years, 11 months and 6 days
35	S. S. Ahluwalia (b. 1951)		INC (1986–2000); BJP (2000–2024)	Lok Sabha (Darjeeling 2014–2019; Bardhaman–Durgapur 2019–2024)	5 June 2014	5 June 2024	10 years	33 years, 11 months and 6 days
36	N. K. P. Salve (1921–2012)		INC (1967–1969, 1978–2002); INC (R) (1969–1978)	Lok Sabha (Betul)	16 March 1967	18 January 1977	9 years, 10 months and 2 days	33 years, 9 months and 11 days
36	N. K. P. Salve (1921–2012)		INC (1967–1969, 1978–2002); INC (R) (1969–1978)	Rajya Sabha (Maharashtra)	24 April 1978	2 April 2002	23 years, 11 months and 9 days	33 years, 9 months and 11 days
37	N. G. Ranga (1900–1995)		INC (1950–1951, 1957–1959, 1980–1991); HSPP (1951); KLP (1951–1957); SWA (1959–1970); INC (R) (1977–1978)	Provisional Parliament (1950–1952); Rajya Sabha (from 1952) (Madras)	28 January 1950	16 March 1957	7 years, 1 month and 16 days	33 years, 8 months and 19 days
37	N. G. Ranga (1900–1995)		INC (1950–1951, 1957–1959, 1980–1991); HSPP (1951); KLP (1951–1957); SWA (1959–1970); INC (R) (1977–1978)	Lok Sabha (Tenali)	10 May 1957	31 March 1962	4 years, 10 months and 21 days	33 years, 8 months and 19 days
37	N. G. Ranga (1900–1995)		INC (1950–1951, 1957–1959, 1980–1991); HSPP (1951); KLP (1951–1957); SWA (1959–1970); INC (R) (1977–1978)	Lok Sabha (Chittoor)	4 September 1962	3 March 1967	4 years, 5 months and 27 days	33 years, 8 months and 19 days
37	N. G. Ranga (1900–1995)		INC (1950–1951, 1957–1959, 1980–1991); HSPP (1951); KLP (1951–1957); SWA (1959–1970); INC (R) (1977–1978)	Lok Sabha (Srikakulam)	22 May 1967	27 December 1970	3 years, 7 months and 5 days	33 years, 8 months and 19 days
37	N. G. Ranga (1900–1995)		INC (1950–1951, 1957–1959, 1980–1991); HSPP (1951); KLP (1951–1957); SWA (1959–1970); INC (R) (1977–1978)	Rajya Sabha (Andhra Pradesh)	19 July 1977	8 January 1980	2 years, 5 months and 20 days	33 years, 8 months and 19 days
37	N. G. Ranga (1900–1995)		INC (1950–1951, 1957–1959, 1980–1991); HSPP (1951); KLP (1951–1957); SWA (1959–1970); INC (R) (1977–1978)	Lok Sabha (Guntur)	21 January 1980	13 March 1991	11 years, 1 month and 20 days	33 years, 8 months and 19 days
38	Jaswant Singh (1938–2020)		BJP (1980–2014); Independent (2014–2020)	Rajya Sabha (Rajasthan)	9 July 1980	27 November 1989	9 years, 4 months and 18 days	33 years, 1 month and 28 days
38	Jaswant Singh (1938–2020)		BJP (1980–2014); Independent (2014–2020)	Lok Sabha (Jodhpur 1989–1991; Chittorgarh 1991–1997)	19 December 1989	4 December 1997	7 years, 11 months and 15 days	33 years, 1 month and 28 days
38	Jaswant Singh (1938–2020)		BJP (1980–2014); Independent (2014–2020)	Rajya Sabha (Rajasthan)	6 July 1998	16 May 2009	10 years, 10 months and 10 days	33 years, 1 month and 28 days
38	Jaswant Singh (1938–2020)		BJP (1980–2014); Independent (2014–2020)	Lok Sabha (Darjeeling)	3 June 2009	18 May 2014	4 years, 11 months and 15 days	33 years, 1 month and 28 days
39	Sharad Yadav (1947–2023)		BLD (1975–1977); JP (1977–1979); JP (S) (1979); JD (1986–1997); JD (U) (1999–2017)	Lok Sabha (Jabalpur)	18 February 1975	22 August 1979	4 years, 6 months and 4 days	33 years and 10 days
39	Sharad Yadav (1947–2023)		BLD (1975–1977); JP (1977–1979); JP (S) (1979); JD (1986–1997); JD (U) (1999–2017)	Rajya Sabha (Uttar Pradesh)	17 July 1986	28 November 1989	3 years, 4 months and 11 days	33 years and 10 days
39	Sharad Yadav (1947–2023)		BLD (1975–1977); JP (1977–1979); JP (S) (1979); JD (1986–1997); JD (U) (1999–2017)	Lok Sabha (Badaun 1989–1991; Madhepura 1991–1996)	18 December 1989	22 January 1996	6 years, 1 month and 4 days	33 years and 10 days
39	Sharad Yadav (1947–2023)		BLD (1975–1977); JP (1977–1979); JP (S) (1979); JD (1986–1997); JD (U) (1999–2017)	Lok Sabha (Madhepura)	22 May 1996	4 December 1997	1 year, 6 months and 12 days	33 years and 10 days
39	Sharad Yadav (1947–2023)		BLD (1975–1977); JP (1977–1979); JP (S) (1979); JD (1986–1997); JD (U) (1999–2017)	Lok Sabha (Madhepura)	20 October 1999	6 February 2004	4 years, 3 months and 17 days	33 years and 10 days
39	Sharad Yadav (1947–2023)		BLD (1975–1977); JP (1977–1979); JP (S) (1979); JD (1986–1997); JD (U) (1999–2017)	Rajya Sabha (Bihar)	8 July 2004	16 May 2009	4 years, 10 months and 8 days	33 years and 10 days
39	Sharad Yadav (1947–2023)		BLD (1975–1977); JP (1977–1979); JP (S) (1979); JD (1986–1997); JD (U) (1999–2017)	Lok Sabha (Madhepura)	1 June 2009	18 May 2014	4 years, 11 months and 17 days	33 years and 10 days
39	Sharad Yadav (1947–2023)		BLD (1975–1977); JP (1977–1979); JP (S) (1979); JD (1986–1997); JD (U) (1999–2017)	Rajya Sabha (Bihar)	7 July 2014	4 December 2017 (Note: Disqualified)	3 years, 4 months and 27 days	33 years and 10 days
40	Albert Barrow (1908–1990)		(Nominated Anglo-Indian)	Provisional Parliament (1950–1952); Lok Sabha (from 1952)	8 August 1950	27 December 1970	20 years, 4 months and 15 days	32 years, 10 months and 1 day
40	Albert Barrow (1908–1990)		(Nominated Anglo-Indian)	Provisional Parliament (1950–1952); Lok Sabha (from 1952)	11 June 1977	27 November 1989	12 years, 5 months and 16 days	32 years, 10 months and 1 day
41	P. J. Kurien (b. 1941)		INC (1980–2018)	Lok Sabha (Mavelikara 1980–1984, 1989–1999; Idukki 1984–1989)	22 January 1980	26 April 1999	19 years, 3 months and 4 days	32 years, 8 months and 17 days
41	P. J. Kurien (b. 1941)		INC (1980–2018)	Rajya Sabha (Kerala)	18 January 2005	1 July 2018	13 years, 5 months and 13 days	32 years, 8 months and 17 days
42	Dinesh Singh (1925–1995)		INC (1957–1969, 1985–1991, 1993–1995); INC (R) (1969–1977); JP (1977–1980); Independent (1980–1982)	Lok Sabha (Banda 1957–1962; Salon 1967–1971; Pratapgarh 1971–1977)	10 May 1957	18 January 1977	19 years, 8 months and 8 days	32 years, 7 months and 24 days
42	Dinesh Singh (1925–1995)		INC (1957–1969, 1985–1991, 1993–1995); INC (R) (1969–1977); JP (1977–1980); Independent (1980–1982)	Rajya Sabha (Uttar Pradesh)	18 July 1977	2 April 1980	2 years, 8 months and 15 days	32 years, 7 months and 24 days
42	Dinesh Singh (1925–1995)		INC (1957–1969, 1985–1991, 1993–1995); INC (R) (1969–1977); JP (1977–1980); Independent (1980–1982)	Rajya Sabha (Uttar Pradesh)	1 July 1980	2 April 1982	1 year, 9 months and 1 day	32 years, 7 months and 24 days
42	Dinesh Singh (1925–1995)		INC (1957–1969, 1985–1991, 1993–1995); INC (R) (1969–1977); JP (1977–1980); Independent (1980–1982)	Lok Sabha (Pratapgarh)	15 January 1985	13 March 1991	6 years, 1 month and 26 days	32 years, 7 months and 24 days
42	Dinesh Singh (1925–1995)		INC (1957–1969, 1985–1991, 1993–1995); INC (R) (1969–1977); JP (1977–1980); Independent (1980–1982)	Rajya Sabha (Haryana)	26 July 1993	30 November 1995 ^{†}	2 years, 4 months and 4 days	32 years, 7 months and 24 days
43	Nandi Yellaiah (1942–2020)		INC (1980–2019); INC (R) (1977–1978)	Lok Sabha (Siddipet)	25 March 1977	31 December 1984	7 years, 9 months and 6 days	32 years, 7 months and 8 days
43	Nandi Yellaiah (1942–2020)		INC (1980–2019); INC (R) (1977–1978)	Lok Sabha (Siddipet)	18 December 1989	4 December 1997	7 years, 11 months and 16 days	32 years, 7 months and 8 days
43	Nandi Yellaiah (1942–2020)		INC (1980–2019); INC (R) (1977–1978)	Rajya Sabha (Andhra Pradesh)	15 April 2002	14 March 2014	11 years, 10 months and 27 days	32 years, 7 months and 8 days
43	Nandi Yellaiah (1942–2020)		INC (1980–2019); INC (R) (1977–1978)	Lok Sabha (Nagarkurnool)	5 June 2014	24 May 2019	4 years, 11 months and 19 days	32 years, 7 months and 8 days
44	Jagannath Rao (1909–1991)		INC (1957–1969, 1980–1989); INC (R) (1969–1978)	Lok Sabha (Nowrangpur 1957–1967; Berhampur 1967–1989 (named Chatrapur 1967–1977))	10 May 1957	27 November 1989		32 years, 6 months and 17 days
45	Manikrao Gavit (1934–2022)		INC (1981–2014)	Lok Sabha (Nandurbar)	10 December 1981	18 May 2014		32 years, 5 months and 8 days
46	Vayalar Ravi (b. 1937)		INC (R) (1971–1978); INC (1979, 1994–2021)	Lok Sabha (Chirayinkil)	19 March 1971	22 August 1979	8 years, 5 months and 3 days	32 years, 4 months and 8 days
46	Vayalar Ravi (b. 1937)		INC (R) (1971–1978); INC (1979, 1994–2021)	Rajya Sabha (Kerala)	25 July 1994	1 July 2000	5 years, 11 months and 6 days	32 years, 4 months and 8 days
46	Vayalar Ravi (b. 1937)		INC (R) (1971–1978); INC (1979, 1994–2021)	Rajya Sabha (Kerala)	23 April 2003	21 April 2021	17 years, 11 months and 29 days	32 years, 4 months and 8 days
47	Sharad Pawar (b. 1940)		INC (1985–1999); NCP (1999–2024); NCP (SCP) (2024–present)	Lok Sabha (Baramati)	15 January 1985	18 March 1985	2 months and 3 days	32 years, 3 months and 27 days
47	Sharad Pawar (b. 1940)		INC (1985–1999); NCP (1999–2024); NCP (SCP) (2024–present)	Lok Sabha (Baramati)	20 November 1991	3 September 1993	1 year, 9 months and 14 days	32 years, 3 months and 27 days
47	Sharad Pawar (b. 1940)		INC (1985–1999); NCP (1999–2024); NCP (SCP) (2024–present)	Lok Sabha (Baramati 1996–2009; Madha 2009–2014)	22 May 1996	3 April 2014 (Note: Tenure ended upon election to Rajya Sabha.)	17 years, 10 months and 12 days	32 years, 3 months and 27 days
47	Sharad Pawar (b. 1940)		INC (1985–1999); NCP (1999–2024); NCP (SCP) (2024–present)	Rajya Sabha (Maharashtra)	28 April 2014	present	12 years, 5 months and 28 days	32 years, 3 months and 27 days
48	Manmohan Singh (1932–2024)		INC (1991–2024)	Rajya Sabha (Assam)	20 November 1991	14 June 2019	27 years, 6 months and 25 days	32 years, 2 months and 6 days
48	Manmohan Singh (1932–2024)		INC (1991–2024)	Rajya Sabha (Rajasthan)	23 August 2019	3 April 2024	4 years, 7 months and 11 days	32 years, 2 months and 6 days
49	Khagapati Pradhani (1909–1991)		INC (1967–1969, 1980–1999); INC (R) (1969–1978)	Lok Sabha (Nowrangpur)	16 March 1967	26 April 1999		32 years, 1 month and 10 days
50	Giridhar Gamang (b. 1943)		INC (R) (1972–1978); INC (1980–2009)	Lok Sabha (Koraput)	22 March 1972	26 April 1999	27 years, 1 month and 4 days	32 years and 20 days
50	Giridhar Gamang (b. 1943)		INC (R) (1972–1978); INC (1980–2009)	Lok Sabha (Koraput)	2 June 2004	18 May 2009	4 years, 11 months and 16 days	32 years and 20 days
51	Suresh Kalmadi (1944–2026)		IC (S) (1982–1986); INC (1986–2014)	Rajya Sabha (Maharashtra)	26 April 1982	10 May 1996	14 years and 14 days	31 years, 4 months and 19 days
51	Suresh Kalmadi (1944–2026)		IC (S) (1982–1986); INC (1986–2014)	Lok Sabha (Pune)	22 May 1996	4 December 1997	1 year, 6 months and 12 days	31 years, 4 months and 19 days
51	Suresh Kalmadi (1944–2026)		IC (S) (1982–1986); INC (1986–2014)	Rajya Sabha (Maharashtra)	6 July 1998	13 May 2004	5 years, 10 months and 7 days	31 years, 4 months and 19 days
51	Suresh Kalmadi (1944–2026)		IC (S) (1982–1986); INC (1986–2014)	Lok Sabha (Pune)	2 June 2004	18 May 2014	9 years, 11 months and 16 days	31 years, 4 months and 19 days
52	George Fernandes (1930–2019)		SSP (1967–1971); JP (1977–1979, 1980–1984); JP (S) (1979–1980); JD (1989–1994); SAP (1994–2003); JD (U) (2003–2010)	Lok Sabha (Bombay South)	16 March 1967	27 December 1970	3 years, 9 months and 11 days	31 years, 4 months and 14 days
52	George Fernandes (1930–2019)		SSP (1967–1971); JP (1977–1979, 1980–1984); JP (S) (1979–1980); JD (1989–1994); SAP (1994–2003); JD (U) (2003–2010)	Lok Sabha (Muzaffarpur)	25 March 1977	31 December 1984	7 years, 9 months and 6 days	31 years, 4 months and 14 days
52	George Fernandes (1930–2019)		SSP (1967–1971); JP (1977–1979, 1980–1984); JP (S) (1979–1980); JD (1989–1994); SAP (1994–2003); JD (U) (2003–2010)	Lok Sabha (Muzaffarpur 1989–1996, 2004–2008; Nalanda 1996–2004)	18 December 1989	11 November 2008	18 years, 10 months and 24 days	31 years, 4 months and 14 days
52	George Fernandes (1930–2019)		SSP (1967–1971); JP (1977–1979, 1980–1984); JP (S) (1979–1980); JD (1989–1994); SAP (1994–2003); JD (U) (2003–2010)	Rajya Sabha (Bihar)	4 August 2009	7 July 2010	11 months and 3 days	31 years, 4 months and 14 days
53	T. R. Baalu (b. 1941)		DMK (1986–present)	Rajya Sabha (Tamil Nadu)	17 July 1986	29 June 1992	5 years, 11 months and 12 days	31 years, 3 months and 16 days
53	T. R. Baalu (b. 1941)		DMK (1986–present)	Lok Sabha (Chennai South 1996–2009; Sriperumbudur 2009–2014)	22 May 1996	18 May 2014	17 years, 11 months and 26 days	31 years, 3 months and 16 days
53	T. R. Baalu (b. 1941)		DMK (1986–present)	Lok Sabha (Sriperumbudur)	18 June 2019	present	7 years, 4 months and 8 days	31 years, 3 months and 16 days
54	Balasaheb Vikhe Patil (1932–2016)		INC (R) (1971–1978); INC (1980–1998, 2004–2009); SS (1998–2004)	Lok Sabha (Kopargaon)	19 March 1971	13 March 1991	19 years, 11 months and 22 days	31 years, 1 month and 17 days
54	Balasaheb Vikhe Patil (1932–2016)		INC (R) (1971–1978); INC (1980–1998, 2004–2009); SS (1998–2004)	Lok Sabha (Ahmednagar 1998–1999; Kopargaon 1999–2009)	23 March 1998	18 May 2009	11 years, 1 month and 25 days	31 years, 1 month and 17 days
55	C. K. Jaffer Sharief (1933–2018)		INC (R) (1971–1978); INC (1980–2004)	Lok Sabha (Kanakapura 1971–1977; Bangalore North 1977–1996)	19 March 1971	10 May 1996	25 years, 1 month and 21 days	31 years and 5 days
55	C. K. Jaffer Sharief (1933–2018)		INC (R) (1971–1978); INC (1980–2004)	Lok Sabha (Bangalore North)	23 March 1998	6 February 2004	5 years, 10 months and 14 days	31 years and 5 days
56	Vilas Muttemwar (b. 1949)		INC (1980–2014)	Lok Sabha (Chimur)	21 January 1980	27 November 1989	9 years, 10 months and 6 days	30 years and 10 months
56	Vilas Muttemwar (b. 1949)		INC (1980–2014)	Lok Sabha (Chimur)	10 July 1991	10 May 1996	4 years and 10 months	30 years and 10 months
56	Vilas Muttemwar (b. 1949)		INC (1980–2014)	Lok Sabha (Nagpur)	24 March 1998	18 May 2014	16 years, 1 month and 24 days	30 years and 10 months
57	P. A. Sangma (1947–2016)		INC (R) (1977–1978); INC (1980–1999); NCP (1999–2004, 2005–2012); TMC (2004–2005); NPP (2012–2016)	Lok Sabha (Tura)	25 March 1977	27 November 1989	12 years, 8 months and 2 days	30 years, 8 months and 27 days
57	P. A. Sangma (1947–2016)		INC (R) (1977–1978); INC (1980–1999); NCP (1999–2004, 2005–2012); TMC (2004–2005); NPP (2012–2016)	Lok Sabha (Tura)	9 July 1991	10 October 2005	14 years, 3 months and 1 day	30 years, 8 months and 27 days
57	P. A. Sangma (1947–2016)		INC (R) (1977–1978); INC (1980–1999); NCP (1999–2004, 2005–2012); TMC (2004–2005); NPP (2012–2016)	Lok Sabha (Tura)	23 February 2006	20 March 2008	2 years and 26 days	30 years, 8 months and 27 days
57	P. A. Sangma (1947–2016)		INC (R) (1977–1978); INC (1980–1999); NCP (1999–2004, 2005–2012); TMC (2004–2005); NPP (2012–2016)	Lok Sabha (Tura)	5 June 2014	4 March 2016^{†}	1 year, 8 months and 28 days	30 years, 8 months and 27 days
58	Madhavrao Scindia (1945–2001)		BJS (1971–1977); Independent (1977–1979); INC (1980–2001)	Lok Sabha (Guna 1971–1984, 1999–2001; Gwalior 1984–1999)	19 March 1971	30 September 2001^{†}		30 years, 6 months and 11 days
59	Sitaram Kesri (1919–2000)		INC (1967–1969, 1980–2000); INC (R) (1969–1977)	Lok Sabha (Katihar)	16 March 1967	27 December 1970	3 years, 9 months and 11 days	30 years, 5 months and 2 days
59	Sitaram Kesri (1919–2000)		INC (1967–1969, 1980–2000); INC (R) (1969–1977)	Rajya Sabha (Bihar)	19 July 1971	2 April 1980	8 years, 8 months and 14 days	30 years, 5 months and 2 days
59	Sitaram Kesri (1919–2000)		INC (1967–1969, 1980–2000); INC (R) (1969–1977)	Rajya Sabha (Bihar)	7 July 1980	6 July 1986	5 years, 11 months and 29 days	30 years, 5 months and 2 days
59	Sitaram Kesri (1919–2000)		INC (1967–1969, 1980–2000); INC (R) (1969–1977)	Rajya Sabha (Bihar)	25 April 1988	2 April 2000	11 years, 11 months and 8 days	30 years, 5 months and 2 days
60	Satyanarayan Jatiya (b. 1946)		BJP (1980–2020)	Lok Sabha (Ujjain)	21 January 1980	31 December 1984	4 years, 11 months and 10 days	30 years, 3 months and 22 days
60	Satyanarayan Jatiya (b. 1946)		BJP (1980–2020)	Lok Sabha (Ujjain)	18 December 1989	18 May 2009	19 years and 5 months	30 years, 3 months and 22 days
60	Satyanarayan Jatiya (b. 1946)		BJP (1980–2020)	Rajya Sabha (Madhya Pradesh)	28 April 2014	9 April 2020	5 years, 11 months and 12 days	30 years, 3 months and 22 days
61	Bhubaneswar Kalita (b. 1951)		INC (1984–2019); BJP (2019–2026)	Rajya Sabha (Assam)	23 April 1984	9 April 1996	11 years, 11 months and 17 days	30 years and 29 days
61	Bhubaneswar Kalita (b. 1951)		INC (1984–2019); BJP (2019–2026)	Lok Sabha (Guwahati)	23 March 1998	26 April 1999	1 year, 1 month and 3 days	30 years and 29 days
61	Bhubaneswar Kalita (b. 1951)		INC (1984–2019); BJP (2019–2026)	Rajya Sabha (Assam)	15 April 2008	5 August 2019	11 years, 3 months and 21 days	30 years and 29 days
61	Bhubaneswar Kalita (b. 1951)		INC (1984–2019); BJP (2019–2026)	Rajya Sabha (Assam)	22 July 2020	9 April 2026	5 years, 8 months and 18 days	30 years and 29 days

== See also ==
- List of longest-serving Indian chief ministers
- List of longest-serving members of the Union Council of Ministers
