= Good governance =

Performing public services competently for the benefit of all citizens

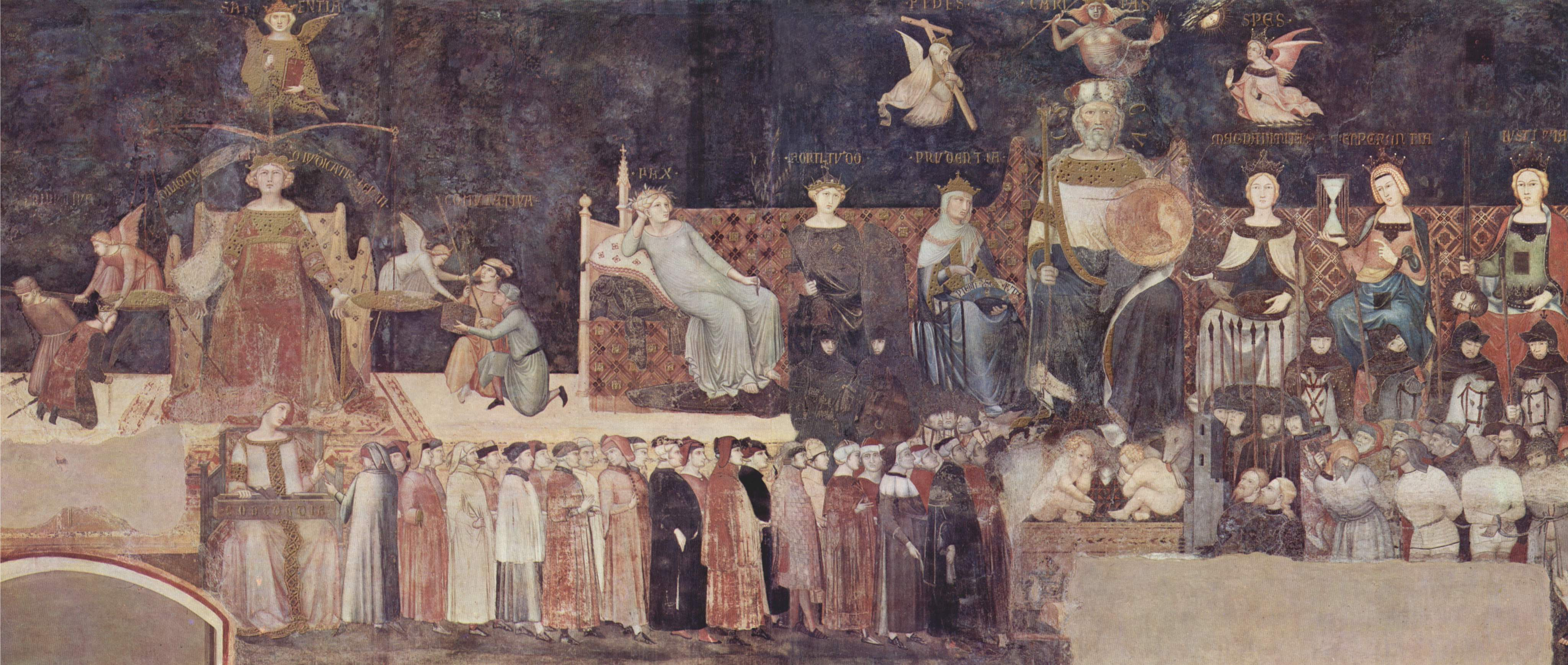
The Allegory of Good Government in the council hall of the Palazzo Pubblico (fresco by Ambrogio Lorenzetti, 1338-1340)

Good governance is the process of measuring how public institutions conduct public affairs, manage public resources, and guarantee the realization of human rights in a manner essentially free of abuse and corruption and with due regard for the rule of law. Governance is "the process of decision-making and the process by which decisions are implemented (or not implemented)". Governance in this context can apply to corporate, international, national, or local governance as well as the interactions between other sectors of society.

The concept of "good governance" thus emerges as a model to compare ineffective economies or political bodies with viable economies and political bodies. The concept centers on the responsibility of governments and governing bodies to meet the needs of the masses as opposed to select groups in society. Because countries often described as "most successful" are liberal-democratic states, concentrated in Europe and the Americas, good governance standards often measure other state institutions against these states. Aid organizations and the authorities of developed countries often will focus the meaning of "good governance" to a set of requirements that conform to the organization's agenda, making "good governance" imply many different things in many different contexts.

== In politics ==
The term governance became widespread in Western scholarly and government discourse in the late 1980s and early 1990s. It was introduced through the policy texts of international institutions like the World Bank.

Good governance is a broad term and definitions vary. According to Fukuyama (2013), the ability of the state and the independence of the bureaucracy are the two factors that determine whether governance is excellent or terrible. They also complement one another in that more autonomy should be allowed when the state is more capable, such as through tax collection, since bureaucrats can carry out their duties well without much guidance. However, less latitude and greater regulation are preferable in states with lower levels of capability.

A further perspective on effective governance is based on results. There is no better way to think about good governance than through deliverables, which are precisely the ones demanded by citizens, like security, health, education, water, contract enforcement, property protection, environmental protection, and the right to vote and fair wages. This is because governments operate with the intention of providing public goods to their constituents.

Similarly, good governance might be approximated with provision of public services in an efficient manner, higher participation given to certain groups in the population like the poor and the minorities, the guarantee that citizens have the opportunity of checks and balances on the government, the establishment and enforcement of norms for the protection of the citizens and their property and the existence of independent judiciary systems.

Lawson (2011) in his review of Rothstein's book The Quality of Government: Corruption, Social Trust, and Inequality in International Perspective mentions that the author relates good governance to the concept of impartiality, which is basically when the bureaucrats perform their tasks following the public interest rather than their self-interest. Lawson differs with him in that this impartial application of law ignores important factors like the economic liberalism, which matters due to its relation with economic growth.

The efficiency of one-party governments might seem appealing, but leaders need a deep understanding of a country's power structure and "moral economy", says Meg Rithmire. Her book Precarious Ties: Business and the State in Authoritarian Asia explores the delicate relationship between capitalists and autocrats in the region.

According to Bo Rothstein and Jan Teorell, the key characteristic of good governance is the impartiality of government institutions.

== In business ==
In corporate affairs, good governance can be observed in any of the following relationships:

- between governance and corporate management
- between governance and employee standards
- between governance and corruption in the workplace

The meaning of good governance in regards to corporate sectors varies between actors. Legislation has been enacted in an attempt to influence good governance in corporate affairs. In the United States, the Sarbanes–Oxley Act of 2002 set up requirements for businesses to follow. Whistleblowing has also been widely used by corporations to expose corruption and fraudulent activity.

== Reform and standards ==
Three institutions can be reformed to promote good governance: the state, the private sector and civil society. However, among different cultures, the need and demand for reform can vary depending on the priorities of that country's society. A variety of country level initiatives and international movements put emphasis on various types of governance reform. Each movement for reform establishes criteria for what they consider good governance based on their own needs and agendas. The following are examples of good governance standards for prominent organizations in the international community.

=== United Nations ===
The United Nations (UN) is playing an increasing role in good governance. According to former UN Secretary-General Kofi Annan, "Good governance is ensuring respect for human rights and the rule of law; strengthening democracy; promoting transparency and capacity in public administration." To implement this, the UN follows eight principles:

- Participation – People should be able to voice their own opinions through legitimate immediate organizations or representatives.
- Rule of Law – Legal framework should be enforced impartially, especially on human right laws.
- Consensus Oriented – Mediates differing interests to meet the broad consensus on the best interests of a community.
- Equity and Inclusiveness – People should have opportunities to improve or maintain their well-being.
- Effectiveness and Efficiency – Processes and institutions should be able to produce results that meet the needs of their community while making the best of their resources.
- Accountability – Governmental institutions, private sectors, and civil society organizations should be held accountable to the public and institutional stakeholders.
- Transparency – Information should be accessible to the public and should be understandable and monitored.
- Responsiveness – Institutions and processes should serve all stakeholders.

=== International Monetary Fund ===
The International Monetary Fund (IMF) was created at a United Nations (UN) conference in Bretton Woods, New Hampshire. In 1996, the IMF declared "promoting good governance in all its aspects, including by ensuring the rule of law, improving the efficiency and accountability of the public sector, and tackling corruption, as essential elements of a framework within which economies can prosper". The IMF feels that corruption within economies is caused by the ineffective governance of the economy, either too much regulation or too little regulation. To receive loans from the IMF, countries must have certain good governance policies, as determined by the IMF, in place.

=== World Bank ===
The World Bank introduced the concept in its 1992 report entitled "Governance and Development". According to the document, good governance is an essential complement to sound economic policies and is central to creating and sustaining an environment which fosters strong and equitable development. For the World Bank, good governance consists of the following components: capacity and efficiency in public sector management, accountability, legal framework for development, and information and transparency.

The Worldwide Governance Indicators is a program funded by the World Bank to measure the quality of governance of over 200 countries. It uses six dimensions of governance for their measurements, Voice & Accountability, Political Stability and Lack of Violence, Government Effectiveness, Regulatory Quality, Rule of Law, and Control of Corruption. They have been studying countries since 1996.

== Effects ==
=== International humanitarian funding ===
Good governance defines an ideal that is difficult to achieve in full, though it is something development supporters consider supporting. Major donors and international financial institutions, like the International Monetary Fund (IMF) World Bank, are basing their aid and loans on the condition that the recipient undertakes reforms ensuring good governance. Several bilateral donors, such as the US Government's Millennium Challenge Corporation require countries to meet certain standards of good governance prior to receiving assistance. These conditions are due to the close link between poor governance and corruption, the connection between good governance and aid effectiveness, and the relationship between good governance and poverty reduction.

=== Democratization ===
Because concepts such as civil society, decentralisation, peaceful conflict management and accountability are often used when defining the concept of good governance, the definition of good governance promotes many ideas that closely align with effective democratic governance. Not surprisingly, emphasis on good governance can sometimes be equated with promoting democratic government. However, a 2011 literature review analyzing the link between democracy and development by Alina Rocha Menocal of the Overseas Development Institute stresses the inconclusiveness of evidence on this relationship.

==== Example ====
A good example of this close association, for some actors, between western democratic governance and the concept of good governance is the following statement made by U.S. Secretary of State Hillary Clinton in Nigeria on August 12, 2009:

Again, to refer to President Obama's speech, what Africa needs is not more strong men, it needs more strong democratic institutions that will stand the test of time. (Applause.) Without good governance, no amount of oil or no amount of aid, no amount of effort can guarantee Nigeria's success. But with good governance, nothing can stop Nigeria. It's the same message that I have carried in all of my meetings, including my meeting this afternoon with your president. The United States supports the seven-point agenda for reform that was outlined by President Yar'Adua. We believe that delivering on roads and on electricity and on education and all the other points of that agenda will demonstrate the kind of concrete progress that the people of Nigeria are waiting for.

=== Poverty ===
A range of sources have found linkages between poverty reduction and good governance. Some find that growth is most effective at reducing poverty in well governed countries. Others find that there is a direct impact of good governance on poverty reduction. Some studies find that good governance above a certain level contributes positively to poverty reduction. Others still find a relationship between governance and poverty even controlling for economic growth, indicating an independent association.

== Criticism ==
According to Sam Agere, "The discretionary space left by the lack of a clear well-defined scope for what governance encompasses allows users to choose and set their own parameters."

In the book Contesting 'good' governance, Eva Poluha and Mona Rosendahl contest standards that are common to western democracy as measures of "goodness" in government. By applying political anthropological methods, they conclude that while governments believe they apply concepts of good governance while making decisions, cultural differences can cause conflict with the heterogeneous standards of the international community.

An additional source of good governance criticism is The Intelligent Person's Guide to Good Governance, written by Surendra Munshi. Munshi's work was created in order to "revive" good governance. Many individuals tend to either wave away and be bored with the idea of governance, or not have a clue to what it has at all. This book is a generalized discussion on what the purpose of good governance is and how it serves that purpose throughout our society. Munshi targets the book toward anyone doing research or just simply "those concerned with the issue of governance".

Rethinking Systems: Configurations of Politics and Policy in Contemporary Governance, written by Michael P. Crozier, is another work analyzing good governance. Crozier's article discusses the different dynamics of changes that occur throughout communication systems and the effect it has on governance. The idea of various perspectives is presented throughout the article. This allows the reader to be able to see what contemporary governance is like from different viewpoints. Crozier's motive was to also create an open mindset when referring to how governance and policy within society operate, especially with the constant changes occurring day to day.

Recent criticism has been aimed at the idea that good governance and institutions are one of the primary explanatory variables of economic growth, such as argued by Kaufmann and Kraay and Acemoglu and Robinson, which has put institutional reforms high on global development agendas. The criticism is fundamentally concerned with the issue that the relatively few countries which have managed to develop rapidly over the last 70 years did not have the "right" kind of institutions; in contrast, countries like China and South Korea have been plagued by corruption and a lack of checks-and-balances during their development trajectories. Or as the development economist Dani Rodrik put it: "A development strategy that focused on anti-corruption in China would not have produced anything like the growth rate that this country has experienced since 1978, nor would it have resulted in 400 million plus fewer people in extreme poverty."

As a result, it has been pointed out that anti-corruption efforts and government reforms can have very negative consequences in especially fragile countries there can be significantly bigger barriers to economic growth than corruption or institutional quality, and anti-corruption efforts and governance reforms often fail because of a suboptimal understanding of local socio-political contexts.

Various authors have furthermore argued that "good governance" provides a very unhelpful development agenda as it is unclear what the "right" kind of institutions are or how they should be realized even if we were to accept that they are necessary or helpful.

== See also ==
- Developing country
- Due diligence
- Good Governance Day
- Peace, order and good government
