= Rajkumari Kaul =

Indian woman, related to Indira Gandhi

Rajkumari Kaul, (née Haksar)
- Born: Rajkumari Haksar; 13 September 1925; Gwalior, India
- Died: May 3, 2014 (aged 88); New Delhi, India
- Spouse: Professor Brij Narain Kaul ()
- Children: Nandita Nanda, Namita Bhattacharya (daughters)
- Relatives: Indira Gandhi
- Family: Nehru–Gandhi family

Rajkumari Kaul, (née Haksar; 13 September 1925 – 3 May 2014, was an Indian personality. She was one of the close friends of Atal Bihari Vajpayee and an influential person in his personal life. They both met during their college days in Gwalior and were known to each other since then.

== About ==
Born as Rajkumari Haksar in Gwalior, Mrs. Kaul was in the blood relation of Indira Gandhi, and a 'household member' of Indian Prime Minister Atal Bihari Vajpayee's family, and the mother of Vajpayee's adopted daughter Namita. Political scientist Vinay Sitapati, in his book 'Jugalbandi: The BJP before Modi', writes "The heart of the relationship between Vajpayee and Rajkumari was intellectual. From a provincial north Indian milieu, Vajpayee was both perplexed by as well as attracted to an educated woman who could hold her own."

== Death ==
When she died on 3 May 2014, Atal Bihari Vajpayee bedridden after his 2009 stroke, could not attend her last rites due to ill health but numerous political dignitaries viz. L K Advani, Sonia Gandhi, Rajnath Singh, Sushma Swaraj, Arun Jaitley, Jyotiraditya Scindia and Ravi Shankar Prasad attended her last rites. RSS pracharak Ramlal was also present.
