= Suresh Nanda =

Indian businessman and former Indian Navy officer

- Born: 1 June 1941 (age 85); Karachi, Sind, British India
- Occupations: Businessman; navy officer (retired)
- Spouse: Renu Nanda
- Children: 2
- Father: Sardarilal Mathradas Nanda
- Military career
- Allegiance: India
- Branch: Indian Navy
- Service years: unknown
- Rank: Lieutenant commander

Suresh Nanda (born 1 June 1941) is an Indian businessman and former naval officer. Nanda was a Lieutenant Commander in the Indian Navy, before starting his business career in the 1970s. In his business career, Nanda's business interests have been the defence, hospitality, information technology and infrastructure industries.

== Early life and education ==
Suresh Nanda was born to Admiral Sardarilal Mathradas Nanda and Sumitra Nanda in Karachi, British India. His father, Sardarilal Mathradas, had also served as the Chief of the Naval Staff of the Indian Navy. Nanda studied in St. Columba's School, Delhi, the same school where notable people, including Shah Rukh Khan, Rahul Gandhi, Sanjay Gandhi and officers of the Indian Armed Forces like Rana Chhina, Arun Khetarpal and DS Hooda, had studied.

== Navy career ==
Nanda graduated from the 16th course of the National Defence Academy and joined the Indian Navy. He eventually reached the rank of Lieutenant Commander; however, Nanda left the Indian Navy while serving as his father's flag lieutenant because "his father’s looming personality ensured he never got credit for anything he did."

== Business career ==
Nanda began his business career after leaving the Indian Navy and by the 1970s, he joined his father's company, Crown Corporation. His, father Sardarilal Mathradas, had set up the company after to re-employ retired naval personnel. Nanda later took control of the Crown Corporation, and the company eventually became the Crown Group, with business interests in the defence, information technology and infrastructure industries. He also founded and managed the company Dynatron Services, which focused on providing maintenance and after-sales service to for equipment sold in India.

In 2000, Nanda stated in interviews that he founded the company C-1 India, an e-commerce company that focused on providing an online portal for procurement and tenders for Indian government departments and government companies. C-1 India came under scrutiny in 2008 due to its links with Nanda. Despite Vivek Agarwal, the company president, stating in 2008 that Nanda was longer involved with the company, the office address of C-1 India, D-5 Defence Colony, New Delhi, had a board outside listing C-1 India and Nanda's other companies: Crown Corporation and Dynatron Services. The scrutiny of C-1 India focused on foreign fund transfers into the company's accounts and queries on how government companies, including the then Ordinance Factory Board, was doing business with the company despite Nanda being named an arms dealer.

In 2003, Nanda entered the hotel industry by acquiring the Claridges Hotel in New Delhi and the Nabha Palace Hotel in Mussoorie. Subsequently, he built Vivanta Surajkund which is managed by the Indian Hotels Company Limited. In 2015, he expanded made his hotel business international and built Taj Dubai in Dubai.

== Arms dealing and conviction ==
Nanda has since the 1980s repeatedly faced allegations of being one of the three largest arms dealers in India and he was convicted by a special court in 2021 in connection with defence deals and bribery. Sudhir Choudhrie and Vipin Khanna faced allegations of being among the other two largest arms dealers, and the families of all three individuals, including Nanda's family, were reported to have had a controlling presence in the Indian defence industry since the 1980s. According to journalist Sandeep Unnithan in 2008, his company, the Crown Corporation was "associated with major defence deals concluded with the Soviet Union and later Russia...The booming arms trade of the ’80s and ’90s gave the Nandas all the trappings of plutocracy: a sprawling mansion on Grosvenor Square in London’s exclusive Mayfair district, a mansion on Prithviraj Road in the heart of Lutyens' Delhi and Bentleys and BMWs in the garage." In 2006, alleged arms dealer Abhishek Verma claimed that he was being framed for the Scorpene deal scam by former Deputy Prime Minister of India L.K. Advani, who Verma further claimed was being assisted and funded by Nanda.

=== Operation West End and Barak Missile scandal ===
In 2001, Operation West End, a sting operation conducted by Tehelka, named Nanda as one of the recipients of kickbacks in the acquisition of Barak 1 missiles, manufactured by Israeli Aerospace Industries (IAI), by the Indian government. It was alleged in Operation West End, that Nanda paid a bribe to Samata Party President Jaya Jaitley. However, the Central Bureau of Investigation (CBI), after their investigation of the Barak Missile scandal, filed a closure report due to lack of evidence. In Tehelka's conversation with retired Lieutenant Colonel V.K. Berry as part of the sting operation, he stated that Nanda was one of the three largest arms dealers.

=== Conviction ===
In the First Information Report filed on 9 October 2005, the CBI mentioned large payments from the firm MTU Aero Engines, a supplier to IAI, into the bank accounts of Dynatron Services, a company managed by Suresh Nanda and his family members during the relevant period. In March 2008, Nanda was arrested by the CBI, along with his son Sanjeev and chartered accountant Bipin Shah while reportedly trying to bribe an Income Tax Department (IT Department) officer Ashutosh Verma, the deputy director of IT (investigations), with Rs 10 crore to keep under wraps the report of a series of IT raids on his premises in 2007, which reportedly unearthed incriminating evidence of his involvement in the Barak Missile scandal.

The CBI's evidence against Nanda included 134 incriminating telephone conversations and messages that were intercepted in 2008. The CBI also produced as evidence, 32 incriminating conversations between Nanda and others, which included a prosecution witnesses that was related to discussions about a land deal in Goa. The special court convicted all four for bribery charges in April 2021 and sentenced them to one-year of rigorous imprisonment.

== Personal life ==
Nanda is married to Renu Nanda and has two children, Sanjeev and Sonali. His daughter, Sonali, married businessman Peter Punj in 2002.

In 1999, Nanda's 19-year-old son Sanjeev Nanda ran over and killed six people, including three police constables in a hit and run with his BMW in New Delhi. Tests showed that Sanjeev was drunk at the time of the accident. He was sentenced to five years in jail by a Delhi court; but the Delhi High Court allowed him to serve two years instead. The Delhi Police appeal the reduced sentence to the Supreme Court and sought a harsher 10-year imprisonment. However, the Supreme Court allowed Sanjeev Nanda to be released on account of his time served, required him to do two years of community service and pay a fine of 50 lakh rupees.
