= IFL =

IFL may refer to:

== American football ==
- Intense Football League (2004–2008), in the United States, merged into the Indoor Football League
- Indoor Football League (2008–present), in the United States
- Intercontinental Football League, a European league proposed by the NFL in the 1970s
- Israel Football League (2007–present), in Israel
- Italian Football League (2008–present), in Italy

== Association football ==
- Indonesian Futsal League
- Indian Football League, a precursor of India's I-League
- Irish Football League, Northern Ireland
- Istanbul Football League, the football league of the Ottoman Empire (defunct)

== Other ==
- Interflug (1963–1990), national airline of East Germany
- International Fight League, a former American mixed martial arts league
- Imperial Fascist League, British fascist group of the 1930s
- Imperial Federation League, advocated consolidation of the British Empire
- Intact forest landscape
- Integrated Facility for Linux, an IBM mainframe processor for the Linux operating system
- Baylor Institute for Faith and Learning, division of a Baptist university in Texas
- IFL (chemotherapy), a chemotherapy regimen
- Institute for Learning, a defunct UK body intended to promote teaching
- Indian Federation of Labour (1941–1948), a British-supported federation of Indian trade unions
- International Ferro Metals, a ferrochrome producer operating in South Africa
- Innisfail Airport, IATA airport code "IFL"
- identity-first language
