= Placid D'Mello =

Indian trade union leader

Placid D’Mello
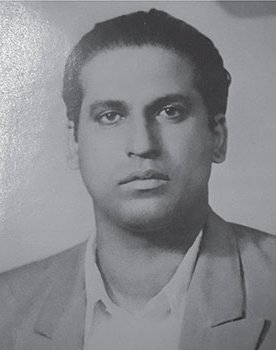
- Born: 1919
- Died: 20 March 1958 (aged 38–39); Calcutta, West Bengal, India

Placid D'Mello (1919 – 20 March 1958) was an Indian trade union leader. He was the founder of the Brihanmumbai Municipal Mazdoor Union (MMU), BEST workers union and All India Port and Dock Workers Federation.

== Career ==
D'Mello came to Bombay in 1936 and took the job of tally clerk at a stevedore company. Later, as a leader of dock workers, he demanded a war bonus owing to greater profits and an end to casual employment. Enraged by shoddy working conditions, D'Mello started organising dock workers in the early 1940's and became a working member of the Socialist Party faction led by Lohia and JP. D'Mello was also marshalling the Socialist base in Southern India mainly in his hometown of South Kanara, through his links with noted Coastal Canarian Socialist and Freedon fighter Ammembala Balappa.

In 1949, D'Mello was arrested under Bombay Public Security Act and externed from Bombay. In April 1949, he arrived in Mangalore where he met George Fernandes. George used to considered D'Mello as his mentor.

On 22 February 1950, a motorman strike was called in South Canara which lasted for seven days. But on the night the strike began, D'Mello was arrested under Preventive Detention Act and was jailed in Vellore. He was released on 6 October 1950 and returned to Bombay where he was received by around five-thousand dockers at Victoria Terminus.

On 31 August 1951, D'Mello was arrested again along with other senior leaders like S. R. Kulkarni. While still in jail, he was put up as a candidate by Socialist Party in 1951 Bombay assembly election for Mazagaon Ghodapdeo constituency. He received 34.99% of the total votes polled, but lost. After one year of arrest, two-hundred dock workers led by George Fernandes walked from Bombay to Poona to meet Chief Minister Morarji Desai for the release of D'Mello. He was released in March 1953, after eighteen months of imprisonment.

== Death ==
Placid D’Mello died on 20 March 1958, at the age of thirty-nine, in Calcutta. He was buried at Sewri Christian Cemetery.
