= Barak Missile scandal =

2006 Indian Ministry of Defence scandal

The Barak Missile scandal was a case of alleged defence corruption relating to the purchase of Barak 1 Missile Systems by India. The Central Bureau of Investigation (CBI) investigated the case and several people including R. K. Jain, former treasurer of the Samata Party were arrested. The CBI investigated the case and filed a First Information Report (FIR) on 10 October 2006, accusing politicians Defence Minister George Fernandes, Jaya Jaitly, R. K. Jain of receiving kickbacks from arms dealer and former Indian Navy officer Suresh Nanda. In 2007, businessman Vipin Khanna also faced allegations from the CBI of being involved in the scandal.

On 24 December 2013, after investigating for more than seven years, the CBI decided to close the case as it did not find any evidence of the allegations.

== Background ==
The Barak missile system was jointly developed by Israel Aircraft Industries (IAI) and RAFAEL Armament Development Authority of Israel. On 23 October 2000, contracts had been signed by the Government of India to procure seven Barak systems at a total cost $199.50 million and 200 missiles at a cost of $69.13 million. This was done despite objections raised by several groups, including members of the team that had originally visited Israel to observe the missile performance, and APJ Abdul Kalam, then heading the Defence Research and Development Organisation. Though some of the objections were of a procedural nature, the Chief of the Naval Staff Admiral Sushil Kumar was accused of not considering these objections.

According to journalist Sandeep Unnithan, "as of 1999, the Trishul (a missile which the DRDO has since shelved) was nowhere near induction. The navy went in for the Barak because it was the only anti-missile capable of defending its warships from missile attack—during the Kargil deployment of 1999."

== Operation West End ==
In 2001, "Operation West End", a sting operation conducted by Tehelka, alleged that 15 defence deals made by the government had involved some sort of kickback and the Barak missile deal was one of them. Transcripts of conversations between the undercover Tehelka operative and former treasurer of the Samata Party, R. K. Jain, indicated that Jain accepted bribes from Suresh Nanda in the amount of ten million.

== Investigations ==
The Vajpayee government set up a commission to investigate the matter. After the 2004 Indian general election, the Manmohan Singh UPA government rejected the commission's partial report in October 2004 and assigned the Central Bureau of Investigation (CBI) to investigate the case. The CBI lodged a First Information Report (FIR) on 9 October 2006 and claimed that George Fernandes the Indian defence minister at that time, and the former navy chief Admiral Sushil Kumar were involved. The FIR notes that the Indian Defence Research & Development Organization had sought to block the import of the Barak system right until the end.

The FIR restated R.K. Jain's admission to Tehelka that three per cent of this cost went to Fernandes and Jaya Jaitly as kickbacks, while he himself was given 0.5 per cent. These commissions were paid to them by Suresh Nanda, the middleman in the deal, according to the Tehelka tapes. Suresh Nanda, his son Sanjeev Nanda, and two others were arrested on 9 March 2008 under section 120-B (criminal conspiracy) and section 201 (committing offence to cause disappearing of evidence) for "Ashutosh Verma, deputy director of I-T (investigations), with Rs 10 crore to keep under wraps the report of a series of I-T raids on his premises in 2007 which unearthed incriminating evidence of his involvement in the Barak case."

In 2007, the CBI filed a chargesheet against Vipin Khanna, a businessman, accusing him of receiving substantial kickbacks in exchange for facilitating the Barak missiles contract.

On 24 December 2013, after investigating for more than seven years, the CBI closed the case and filed a report in court as it did not find any evidence on the allegations. A day before, on 23 December, Defence Ministry headed by AK Antony approved the procurement of additional 262 Barak missiles. The BJP responded by saying: "This is the same case 'created' by Tehelka in 2001 to defame and discredit the then BJP-led NDA government" and demanded that the CBI should take action against Tehelka for "misleading and fabricating false evidence" in the case.
