= Bharathinagar Assembly constituency =

Former constituency in Karnataka, India

Coordinates: 12.49°N 77.03°E

Bharathinagar
- Former constituency for the Karnataka Legislative Assembly

Constituency details
- Country: India
- Region: South India
- State: Karnataka
- Division: Bangalore
- District: Bangalore
- Lok Sabha constituency: Bangalore Central
- Established: 1967
- Abolished: 2008
- Reservation: None

Bharathinagar Assembly constituency was one of the 225 constituencies in the Karnataka Legislative Assembly of Karnataka, a southern state of India. It was also part of Bangalore Central Lok Sabha constituency. It was abolished in 2008 and to form a new Assembly seat territorially, called Sarvagnanagar.

== Members of the Legislative Assembly ==
Election	Member	Party
1967	M. A. Amalorpavam	Indian National Congress
1972	D. Poosalingam	Independent politician
1978	Michael Fernandes	Janata Party
1983	Michael Fernandes	Janata Party
1985	K. J. George	Indian National Congress
1989	K. J. George	Indian National Congress
1994	N. Rajanna	Janata Dal
1999	Alexander. J	Indian National Congress
2004	Nirmal Surana	Bharatiya Janata Party

== Election results ==
=== Assembly Election 2004 ===
2004 Karnataka Legislative Assembly election : Bharathinagar
Party	Candidate	Votes	%	±%
BJP	Nirmal Surana	27,867	44.22%	▲26.65
INC	Alexander. J	22,986	36.48%	▼0.08
JD(S)	N. Rajanna	8,361	13.27%	▲2.02
Independent	Francis Jackson	1,622	2.57%	New
Independent	Ruth Manorama	1,026	1.63%	New
Margin of victory		4,881	7.75%	▼8.45
Turnout		63,027	49.83%	▼2.17
Total valid votes		63,018		
Registered electors		126,479		▲2.47
BJP gain from INC		Swing	▲7.66	

=== Assembly Election 1999 ===
1999 Karnataka Legislative Assembly election : Bharathinagar
Party	Candidate	Votes	%	±%
INC	Alexander. J	23,466	36.56%	▲18.11
JD(U)	R. Pradeep Kumar Reddy	13,067	20.36%	New
BJP	M. Narayanagowda	11,276	17.57%	▲5.58
JD(S)	N. Rajanna	7,220	11.25%	New
Independent	M. Paree	7,187	11.20%	New
AIADMK	V. A. Pugazhendi	850	1.32%	▼11.68
Independent	Harbansingh	690	1.07%	New
Margin of victory		10,399	16.20%	▲0.98
Turnout		64,189	52.00%	▼4.18
Total valid votes		64,189		
Registered electors		123,434		▲13.84
INC gain from JD		Swing	▲2.88	

=== Assembly Election 1994 ===
1994 Karnataka Legislative Assembly election : Bharathinagar
Party	Candidate	Votes	%	±%
JD	N. Rajanna	20,232	33.68%	New
INC	M. J. Victor	11,086	18.45%	▼39.08
AIADMK	V. Pugazhandi	7,810	13.00%	New
INC	K. J. George	7,642	12.72%	New
BJP	Philomena Peris	7,202	11.99%	New
Independent	Michael Fernandes	2,113	3.52%	New
Independent	Shanthakumar	1,282	2.13%	New
CPI	H. Mahadevan	927	1.54%	New
JP	Karunakaran	627	1.04%	New
Margin of victory		9,146	15.22%	▼22.62
Turnout		60,921	56.18%	▼0.36
Total valid votes		60,079		
Rejected ballots		842	1.38%	▼2.21
Registered electors		108,431		▼6.05
JD gain from INC		Swing	▼23.85	

=== Assembly Election 1989 ===
1989 Karnataka Legislative Assembly election : Bharathinagar
Party	Candidate	Votes	%	±%
INC	K. J. George	36,198	57.53%	▲14.43
CPI(M)	S. Suryanarayana Rao	12,387	19.69%	New
JP	N. Rajanna	10,021	15.93%	New
AIML	Ibrahimkhan	1,975	3.14%	New
Independent	R. Samuel	842	1.34%	New
Independent	T. J. Abraham	444	0.71%	New
Independent	M. Pushparajan	442	0.70%	New
Margin of victory		23,811	37.84%	▲30.16
Turnout		65,262	56.54%	▲2.23
Total valid votes		62,921		
Rejected ballots		2,341	3.59%	▲2.58
Registered electors		115,418		▲20.79
INC hold		Swing	▲14.43	

=== Assembly Election 1985 ===
1985 Karnataka Legislative Assembly election : Bharathinagar
Party	Candidate	Votes	%	±%
INC	K. J. George	22,141	43.10%	▲12.71
JP	Michael Fernandes	18,195	35.42%	▼5.08
Independent	V. Shivashankar	5,264	10.25%	New
Independent	M. Sundar	4,925	9.59%	New
Independent	Jaga	529	1.03%	New
Margin of victory		3,946	7.68%	▼2.43
Turnout		51,896	54.31%	▼6.07
Total valid votes		51,370		
Rejected ballots		526	1.01%	▼0.71
Registered electors		95,556		▲12.76
INC gain from JP		Swing	▲2.60	

=== Assembly Election 1983 ===
1983 Karnataka Legislative Assembly election : Bharathinagar
Party	Candidate	Votes	%	±%
JP	Michael Fernandes	20,369	40.50%	▲11.11
INC	K. J. George	15,285	30.39%	▲27.13
Independent	D. Poosalingam	11,806	23.47%	New
Independent	S. R. Prakash	845	1.68%	New
BJP	Sathyanarayana	568	1.13%	New
Independent	A. G. Mohammed Adam	447	0.89%	New
Margin of victory		5,084	10.11%	▲8.84
Turnout		51,173	60.38%	▼4.63
Total valid votes		50,295		
Rejected ballots		878	1.72%	▲0.03
Registered electors		84,745		▲12.84
JP hold		Swing	▲11.11	

=== Assembly Election 1978 ===
1978 Karnataka Legislative Assembly election : Bharathinagar
Party	Candidate	Votes	%	±%
JP	Michael Fernandes	14,106	29.39%	New
INC(I)	Muniswamy. M	13,498	28.12%	New
DMK	D. Poosalingam	9,434	19.66%	New
AIADMK	Padmanabhan. R	5,709	11.89%	New
Independent	Mohamad Dastagir	2,089	4.35%	New
INC	Gangaraj. H. D	1,566	3.26%	▼31.58
Independent	D. Bhashkaran	844	1.76%	New
RPI	Jayaram Alias Massay. M	401	0.84%	New
Margin of victory		608	1.27%	▼4.84
Turnout		48,821	65.01%	▲12.14
Total valid votes		47,997		
Rejected ballots		824	1.69%	▲1.69
Registered electors		75,103		▲0.46
JP gain from Independent		Swing	▼11.56	

=== Assembly Election 1972 ===
1972 Mysore State Legislative Assembly election : Bharathinagar
Party	Candidate	Votes	%	±%
Independent	D. Poosalingam	15,810	40.95%	New
INC	C. Sharada	13,450	34.84%	▲1.69
Independent	D. Bhashkaran	3,769	9.76%	New
INC(O)	S. Sunder Raj	3,724	9.65%	New
Independent	M. Jayaram Alias Musay	565	1.46%	New
Independent	P. C. G. Paul	345	0.89%	New
Independent	K. P. Mir Chandani	319	0.83%	New
Independent	Krishnakant Mishra	319	0.83%	New
SWA	M. S. Mases	303	0.78%	New
Margin of victory		2,360	6.11%	▲5.35
Turnout		39,527	52.87%	▲0.76
Total valid votes		38,604		
Registered electors		74,756		▲15.02
Independent gain from INC		Swing	▲7.80	

=== Assembly Election 1967 ===
1967 Mysore State Legislative Assembly election : Bharathinagar
Party	Candidate	Votes	%	±%
INC	M. A. Amalorpavam	10,808	33.15%	New
Independent	D. Poosalingam	10,560	32.39%	New
Independent	D. Bhashkaran	4,379	13.43%	New
Independent	S. S. Raj	3,941	12.09%	New
Independent	A. A. Michael	1,811	5.55%	New
Independent	P. R. Murthy	1,107	3.40%	New
Margin of victory		248	0.76%	
Turnout		33,869	52.11%	
Total valid votes		32,606		
Registered electors		64,993		
INC win (new seat)				

== See also ==
- Bangalore district
- List of constituencies of the Karnataka Legislative Assembly
