= Vipin Khanna =

Indian businessman, financier and army officer (1930–2019)

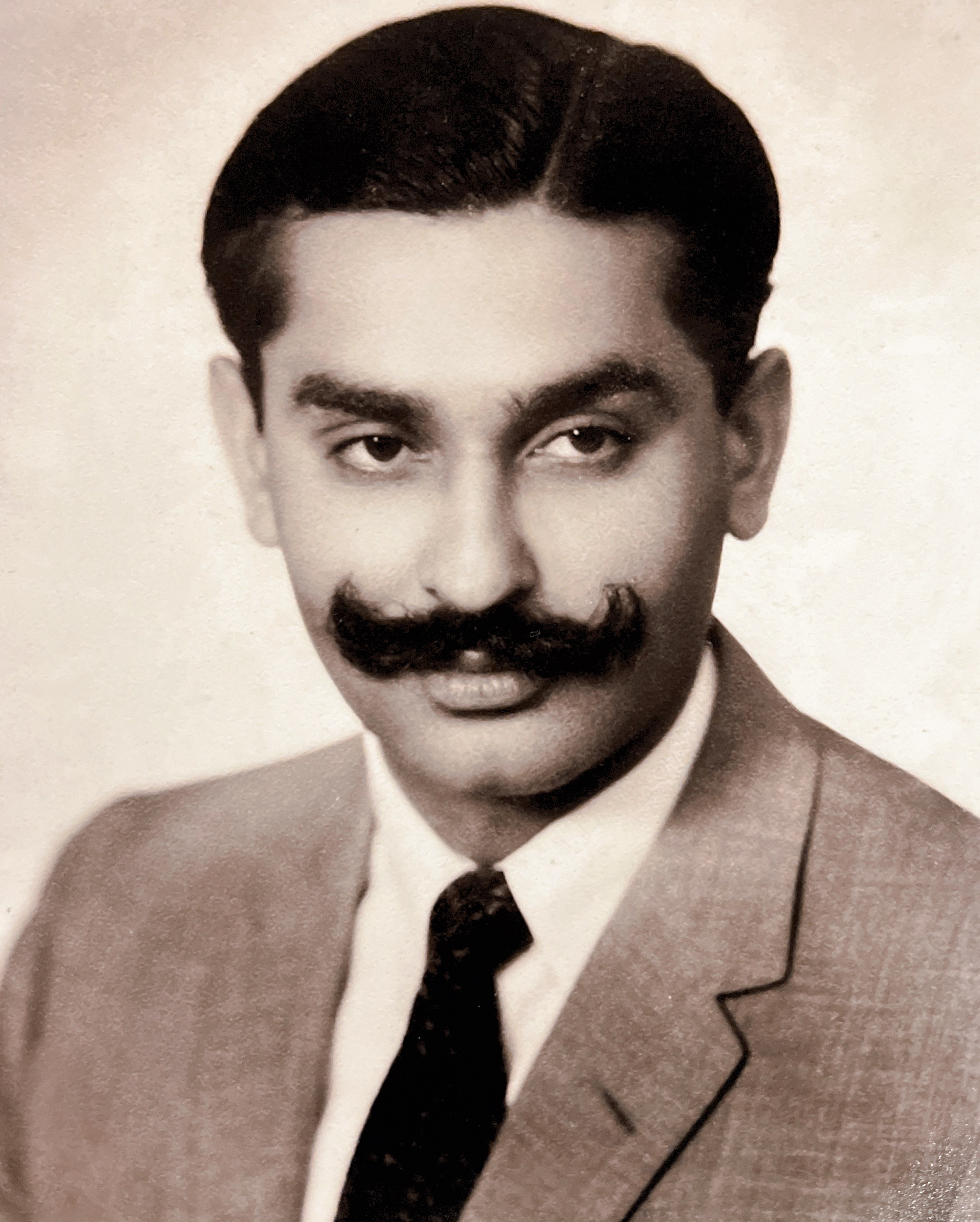
- Khanna in 1963
- Born: Vipin Kumar Khanna; 14 December 1930; Lahore, Punjab, British India
- Died: 7 November 2019 (aged 88); Delhi, India
- Occupations: Businessman; financier; army officer
- Spouse: Naginder Kumari Khanna
- Children: 4, including Arvind
- Parent: Shanti Lal Khanna (father)
- Military career
- Allegiance: India
- Branch: Indian Army
- Service years: 1950-1965
- Rank: Major
- Unit: Brigade of The Guards

Vipin Kumar Khanna (14 December 1930 – 7 November 2019) was an Indian businessman, financier and army officer. Khanna, referred to as an industrialist, had diverse business interests and was a Non-Resident Indian based in London, England. He was commissioned into the Indian Army in 1950, and eventually reached the rank of Major, before voluntarily retiring from the army in 1965. Noted by the Government of India to be a powerful person, Khanna had a controversial business career and faced allegations of operating as a deep state figure. His name was frequently associated with numerous controversies, including allegations of arms lobbying; however, investigations into these matters found no evidence of wrongdoing, and the allegations were subsequently dropped.

== Early life and military career ==
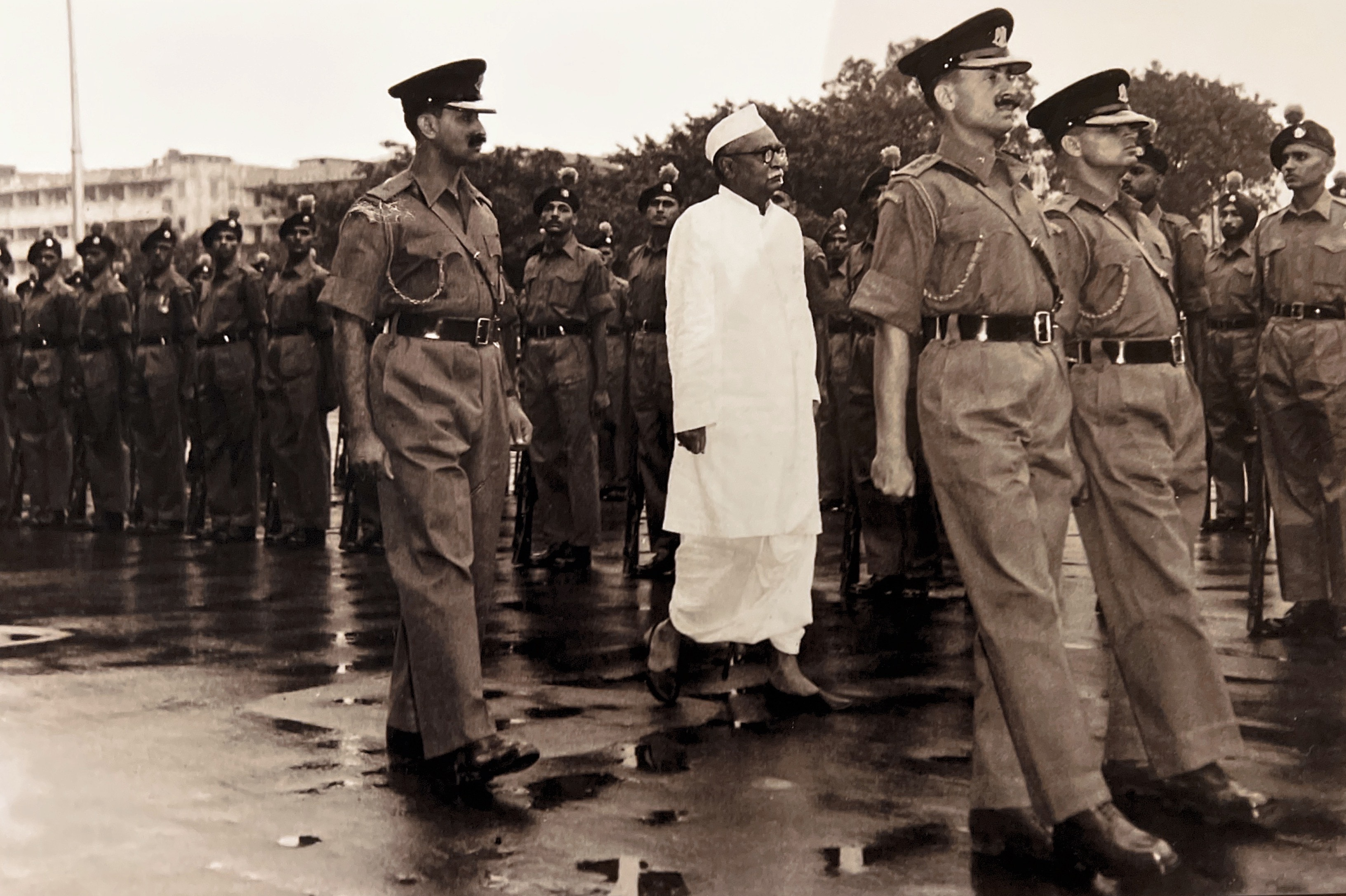
Khanna (near left), during his time in the Indian Army, circa 1950s

Vipin Kumar Khanna was born on 14 December 1930 in Lahore, Punjab Province, British India. Khanna was born into a Punjabi family. He was the son of businessman Shanti Lal Khanna, also known as S.L. Khanna and who had business interests in the manufacturing sector, and Vidya Khanna. His father, Shanti Lal, was also a Freemason. His mother, Vidya, was the daughter of Bhagat Ram Sahni, who founded the Arya Samaj movement in Srinagar, Jammu and Kashmir, and was awarded the title of Rai Sahib by the British Raj. Khanna's brothers were Ravi and Vinod. Khanna, along with his family, fled Lahore during the partition of India in 1947, and migrated to Delhi, India. According to his son, Arvind Khanna, he was from a wealthy family in Lahore, but the family lost their wealth when they fled the city during the Partition, and had to start anew after migrating to Delhi.

In 1950, Khanna was commissioned into the Indian Army after graduating from the Joint Services Wing of the Indian Military Academy, in Dehradun. He was commissioned into the Brigade of the Guards regiment. Khanna eventually rose to the rank of Major; however, he voluntarily retired from the Indian Army in 1965.

== Business career ==
In 1967, Khanna founded Dynamic Sales Service International (DSSI), which initially started as a commodities trading and marketing company. Eventually, DSSI's commodities and marketing business expanded to include commodities from the metals and mining, agriculture, steel, coal, fertilizers, and oil and gas industries. The company also entered the railways, oil, infrastructure, telecommunications equipment, and shipbroking industries.

In the 1980s, Khanna entered the arms and aerospace industries. His arms and aerospace businesses focused on manufacturing for offset agreements. In 1997, Khanna entered the drinks and alcohol industries through his company Clan Morgan, which was based in Alwar, Rajasthan. The company had its distilleries and bottling plants located in Rajasthan. Clan Morgan also had a joint venture with Allied Domecq, called Allied Domecq Spirit & Wine India, and owned 50% of the joint venture. In 2009, Khanna entered the software industry through his company V4 Security Service, which was based in Delhi.

Khanna also had foreign business interests. He expanded into the investment banking and asset management industries by founding FiNoble Advisors in 2005. FiNoble Advisors had offices in New York City, London, and New Delhi. During his business career, Khanna developed various international connections. In 1985, during a visit to India, United States Senator Richard Lugar met with Khanna to examine US foreign policy in India and South Asia. From 1996 to 2005, he served as the Honorary Consul of the Grand Duchy of Luxembourg in New Delhi and was awarded the Order of Merit by Grand Duke Henri of Luxembourg.

== Controversies ==
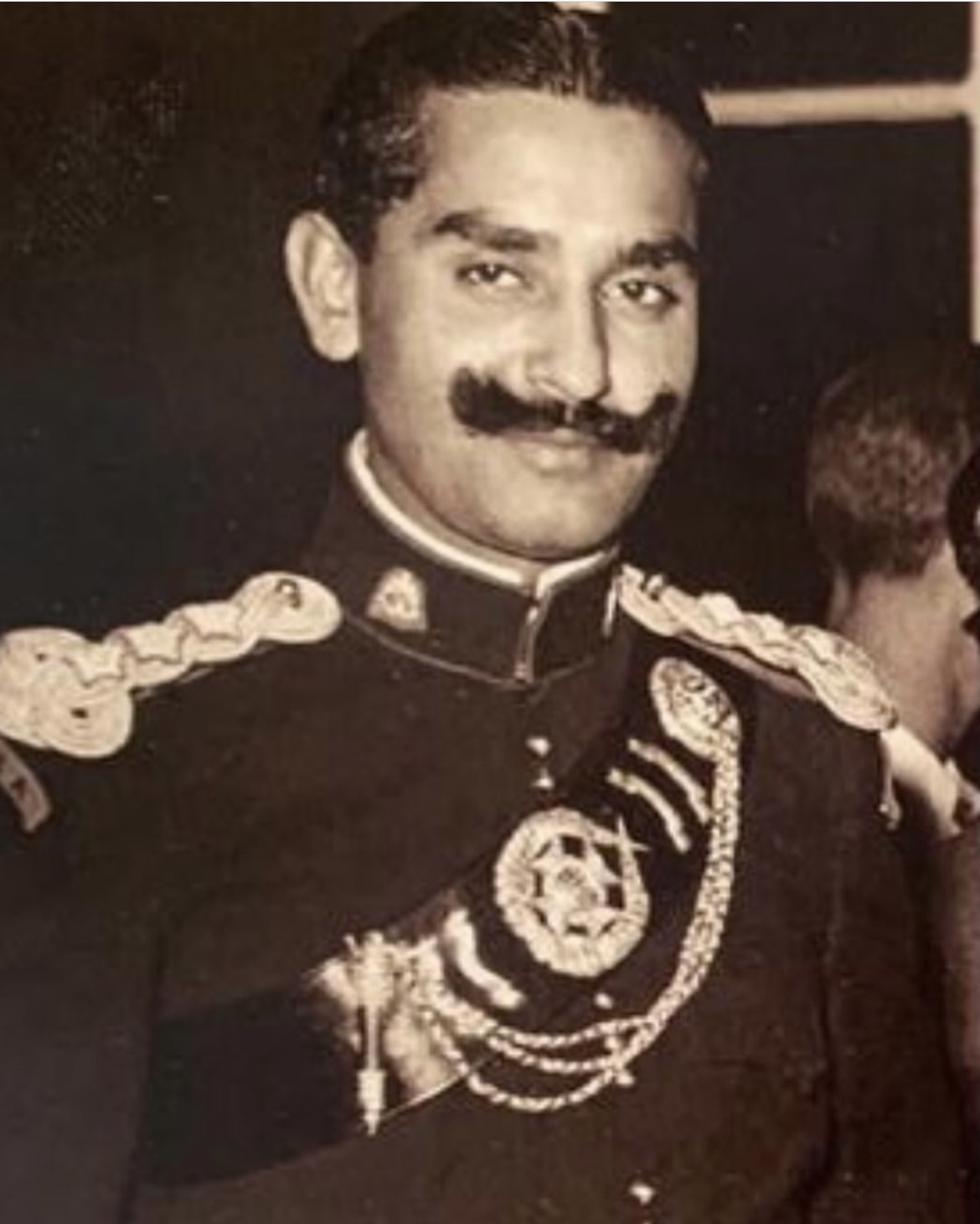
Khanna, circa early 1960s

=== Arms dealer allegations ===
Khanna and his family faced allegations of being one of the largest and most powerful arms dealers in India. Khanna was allegedly one of the three largest arms dealers in India, along with Sudhir Choudhrie and Suresh Nanda. In 2006, the Central Bureau of Investigation (CBI) claimed that the three families had been controlling business in the defence industry of India prior to the Bofors Scandal in the 1980s, and allegedly, their commissions from defence deals were possibly as much as 15%. Before the ban on lobbying for arms deals following the Bofors Scandal in the 1980s, the Ministry of Defence maintained a list of arms agents that was reviewed annually, and Khanna's name appeared on the list every year. In 2012, the Enforcement Directorate (ED) claimed that Khanna and his family's network in the Indian defence industry grew more powerful after the Bofors Scandal.

Khanna was allegedly an influential figure in the Indian defence industry and reportedly, played an instrumental role in the approval of defence deals. Allegations against Khanna suggested that he could influence deals in the defence procurement process by leveraging his network within the Indian bureaucracy and allegedly paying large bribes to politicians, military officials, and bureaucrats involved in the process. Khanna was allegedly linked to various foreign defence companies and was allegedly involved in various arms deals in India. However, the allegations levelled against him were never proven, and the investigations and cases against Khanna were dropped.

In 1986, officials from the Ministry of Finance conducted an investigation into Khanna for allegedly being an arms agent for Saab; however, officials from the ministry later dropped the investigation. In 1987, Khanna was again investigated by the Ministry of Finance for his alleged links to Saab; however, the officer in charge of the investigation was transferred. Khanna was reported in 1986 to have allegedly been the arms agent for Hughes Helicopters, an American helicopter manufacturer. In 1999, it was alleged that he was the arms agent for Thomson-CSF, a French defence, aerospace and electronics company in 2000. It was also alleged in 1999 that Khanna was the arms agent for British Aerospace and Rafael Advanced Defense Systems.

In 2001, Khanna's name appeared in Operation West End, a sting operation that was organised and carried out by Tehelka, an Indian news magazine. During the operation, Tehelka met Lieutenant Colonel V.K. Berry, who claimed that Khanna was allegedly the arms agent for several Israeli defence companies, among which were Elbit Systems and Tadiran Communications. Berry also claimed that he had worked for Khanna for 3 years and had met these companies during that time. Berry made a further claim that Khanna facilitated a deal in which Tadiran Communications supplied communications equipment to the Cabinet Secretariat and that Khanna received commission for this. Berry later recanted his claim about the communications deal, and Khanna testified under oath that Berry had never worked for him.

In 1999, it was alleged that Khanna was involved in the deal signed by the Indian government in 1996 to procure the avionics package for the MiG-21, a Soviet fighter aircraft designed by Mikoyan, with avionics manufactured by various Israeli defence and aerospace companies for which he was allegedly the arms agent.

In 2005, Khanna was accused of allegedly facilitating the arms deal that involved the sale of anti-materiel rifles from Denel, a South African company, to the Indian Army in 2003. The CBI and the ED claimed that Khanna allegedly used Varas Associates, an offshore company to receive a commission for securing the order for Denel. The CBI also claimed that Khanna allegedly influenced the Price Negotiation Committee of the Ministry of Defence. The CBI and ED eventually dropped the case against Khanna due to lack of evidence.

In 2007, Khanna was accused by the CBI of involvement in the Barak Missile scandal, which stemmed from a 2000 contract in which the Indian Navy agreed to purchase Barak anti-missile defence systems and Barak missiles from Israel Aerospace Industries (IAI). In 2007, the CBI filed a chargesheet against Khanna for allegedly receiving vast kickbacks for securing the contract for Israel, and the CBI also confiscated his passport. The CBI stated that Khanna was a very influential and highly connected person, who was powerful both in India and internationally, and so releasing Khanna's passport would adversely impact the investigation. The case against Khanna was eventually dropped due to lack of evidence.

In 2016, the CBI launched a probe into the purchase of three airborne early warning and control (AEW&C) aircraft from Embraer. Khanna was accused of swinging the aircraft deal, which was signed in 2008, in favour of Embraer by influencing the IAF and the Defence Research Development Organization (DRDO). The first information report (FIR) filed by the CBI mentioned that Khanna used an offshore company to channel payments from Embraer into India to use for kickbacks. In 2023, the CBI dropped the legal proceedings against Khanna due to his death in 2019. In 2024, it was reported that in 2005, Embraer had an agreement with a UK-based company stipulating that Khanna would receive a 9% commission on the total value of defence contracts secured from the Indian Air Force (IAF).

=== Other controversies ===
In 2005, it was alleged that Khanna and some members of his family were beneficiaries of corruption in the UN's Oil-for-Food Programme. Reportedly, Natwar Singh, the then-Minister of External Affairs and a family relative of Khanna's, received kickbacks, part of which allegedly went to Saddam Hussein's regime in Iraq. It was also reported that Natwar Singh allegedly helped procure oil contracts for some companies owned by Khanna's family members.

In 2006, amid an investigation into Khanna's alleged business dealings, the Indian Government asserted that he was powerful enough to influence global investigative agencies.

In 2007, Securency, a Reserve Bank of Australia subsidiary, was involved in bribing overseas officials so that Australia could win lucrative polymer banknote printing contracts. It was reported that David Twine, who was at the time Austrade's Asia regional director and one of Australia's senior most foreign trade promotion officials, met with Khanna to discuss work for Securency and to help the company secure government related contracts. The investigation into Securency was, at the time, Australia's largest foreign bribery scandal and investigation.

== Personal life and family ==
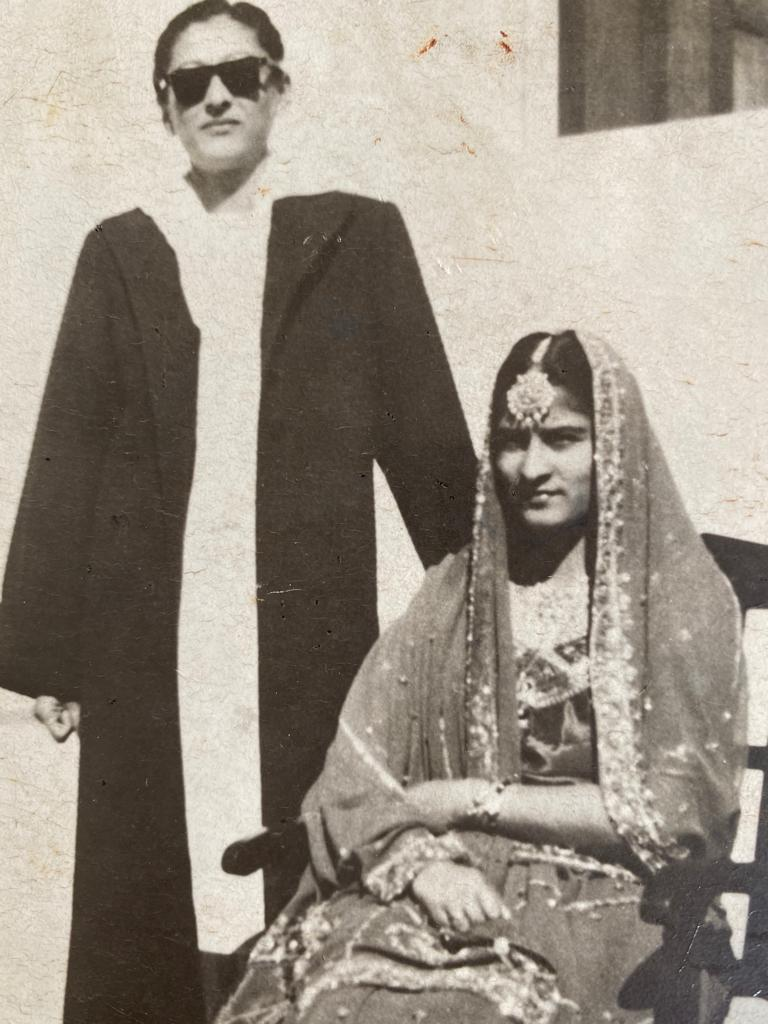
Khanna's wife, Naginder Kumari (right), with her mother, Maharani Manjula Devi of Darkoti (left), a wife of Maharaja Bhupinder Singh. Darkoti was a Kachhwaha Rajput ruled princely state, founded in the 11th century, whose rulers were directly descended from the ruling house of the Kingdom of Amber.

Khanna was married to Naginder Kumari, the daughter of Maharaja Bhupinder Singh of Patiala and a member of the historical Phulkian dynasty. The sister of Yadavindra Singh, the last Maharaja of Patiala, and the paternal aunt of Amarinder Singh, former Chief Minister of Punjab., Naginder held the title of princess until princely titles were abolished by the 26th Amendment to the Constitution of India in 1971. Khanna and Naginder had four children: Vinita, Navin, Arvind and Aditya. His daughter, Vinita, married Randhir Singh, a sports administrator.

Naginder, born in 1937, had family members and family relatives involved in various fields, including politics, bureaucracy, diplomacy, law, and sports administration, as well as affiliations with networks such as Freemasonry. Through one of her sisters, Kumudesh Bhandari, Naginder was the sister-in-law of Romesh Bhandari, former Foreign Secretary of India, former Lieutenant Governor of Delhi, and former Governor of Uttar Pradesh. Through another of her sisters, Kailash Kumari Devi, Naginder was the sister-in-law of Rajendra Narayan Singh Deo, former Chief Minister of Odisha. Among her sisters was Bhavenesh Kumari, an advocate at the Supreme Court of India who represented the then monarch of Sikkim and the Nizam of Hyderabad in brokering agreements with the Indian government. Naginder was also an aunt by marriage to Natwar Singh, former Indian Minister of External Affairs, who married to Naginder's niece. Khanna was a Non-Resident Indian who was based in London and he also had a base in New Delhi. Khanna died on 7 November 2019, at the age of 88, in New Delhi.
