= B. K. Kapur =

Indian businessman

Baljit K. Kapur
- Relatives: Sudhir Choudhrie (nephew); Bhanu Choudhrie (great-nephew)

B. K. Kapur is an Indian businessman and was the chairman of Hindustan Aeronautics Limited, the Indian state-owned aerospace and defence company. Kapur was also the chairman of Dr. B. L. Kapur Memorial Hospital (a unit of Lahore Hospital Society) in New Delhi inaugurated by Jawaharlal Nehru on 2 January 1958. Dr. B. L. Kapur was an eminent obstetrician and gynaecologist who set up a charitable hospital in 1930 at Lahore and a maternity hospital at Ludhiana after partition of India. Dr. B. L. Kapur Memorial Hospital is now known as BLK-Max Super Speciality Hospital.
