= The Life and Times of George Fernandes =

Indian biographical book

- Author: Rahul Ramagyndam
- Language: English
- Publisher: Penguin Random House India
- Publication date: 15 October 2022
- Publication place: India
- Pages: 624
- ISBN: 9780670092888

The life and times of George Fernandes is a biographical book about George Fernandes which is written by Rahul Ramagundam. The book is published by Penguin Random House India. The First Post wrote, "Rahul Ramagundam, who wrote Gandhi’s Khadi (2008) and Including the Socially Excluded (2017), is out with his new book The Life and Times of George Fernandes (2022). Published by Penguin, it is a biography of a trade unionist who became a parliamentarian and minister. Fernandes was often embroiled in controversy for the decisions he made and positions he took. The author, who is an Associate Professor at the Centre for the Study of Social Exclusion and Inclusive Policy at Jamia Millia Islamia, New Delhi, attempts to unpack various facets of the man’s life."

== Reception ==
The New Indian Express wrote in a review "The book provides a credible account of how Fernandes, coming from a Catholic family in Mangalore, abandoned his seminary education in Bangalore and joined the Socialist Party after the latter was forced to leave Congress by the right-wingers of the party".

The Hindu wrote in a review "Rahul Ramagundam’s The Life and Times of George Fernandes, therefore, is of interest not just in terms of one man’s life and political journey, but the coterminous streams of events and ideology that flowed with it".

The Hindustan Times wrote in a review "As Ramagundam writes early in the book, Fernandes is arguably the most important non-Congress and non-Hindutva politician in post-Independence India. His biography is not only his life story but also a subaltern narrative of modern India".

The Indian Express wrote in a review "Rahul Ramagundam’s book ‘The Life and Times of George Fernandes’ is based on 12 years of research, and offers a deep dive into the personal and political life of the leader".

The Telegraph wrote in a review "Ramagundam’s reconstruction and lucid narration of well-researched anecdotes engage readers with this new biography of George Fernandes, a fiery trade union leader, socialist, and an immensely successful politician for more than six decades."

Tribune India wrote in a review "This biography is the result of an exhaustive research and the writer admits that he got “too immersed in microscopic detail and was unable to see the whole picture”. He found himself “in a deep sea of historical facts, assailed from every direction with uncertainty and tentativeness”. The result is an apt introduction to the life and times of George Fernandes."
