= Michael Fernandes (politician) =

Indian politician

Michael Fernandes (born August 1934) is a trade union leader, socialist leader and a senior politician from Bangalore. He is the brother of former union minister George Fernandes.

Michael was born in August 1934 to John Joseph Fernandes and Alice Martha Fernandes (née Pinto), in Mangalore to a Mangalorean Catholic family. He was third of six children, his siblings are George, Lawrence, Paul, Aloysius, and Richard.

Michael is a physics graduate from Madras University and is a retired engineer from ITI Limited. He is married to Donna Fernandes, who is also a social and women's rights activist and is the founder of Vimochana, a women’s rights group based at Bangalore.

He was elected as a corporator from Bangalore for the first time in 1970, contesting as an independent. He was jailed during the Emergency like his brothers George, Lawrence and Aloysius. Arrested in December 1975 he was in jail for 15 months in 1975-77. Michael like his brother was tortured during his detention in Bangalore Central Jail during the Emergency but refused to divulge details of his elder brother George.

He became a member of the Karnataka Legislative Assembly from Bharathi Nagar constituency in 1978 from Janata Party, and won the next term from the same constituency in 1983 but served only for a short time as he lost in the mid-term polls held in 1985.

In 1988, he became a Member of Karnataka Legislative Council. He contested Lok Sabha elections under Janata Dal (United) ticket, as a part of NDA and placed second securing 3,50,000 votes in 1999.

Being a senior member of the Janata Dal (United) its Karnataka unit named Michael Fernandes as one of the party's senior vice-presidents in 2010.

However, in 2013 he joined Karnataka Janata Paksha and contested election from Sarvagna Nagar constituency under its party symbol but lost. Karnataka Janata Paksha merged into Bharatiya Janata Party in 2014. Michael continues his Trade Union work as he is the Advisor or President of numerous unions mostly in Karnataka, Tamil Nadu and Kerala besides other parts of India.

Michael is one of the trustees of the Lawrence Fernandes Foundation, set up for the welfare and benefit of the poor and needy. It was launched in memory of their deceased brother Lawrence by him and his brothers George Fernandes, Aloysius and others.

== See also ==
- Lawrence Fernandes
- Snehalatha Reddy
