= K. J. George =

Indian politician

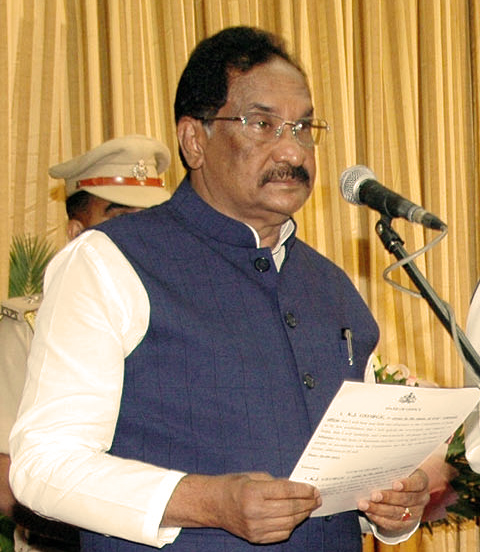

Cabinet Minister Government of Karnataka
- Incumbent
- Assumed office 3 June 2026
- Governor: Thawarchand Gehlot
- Cabinet: Shivakumar ministry
- Chief Minister: D. K. Shivakumar
- Ministry and Departments: Energy; Tourism
- Preceded by: H. K. Patil (Tourism)
- In office 20 May 2023 – 29 May 2026
- Governor: Thawarchand Gehlot
- Cabinet: Second Siddaramaiah ministry
- Chief Minister: Siddaramaiah
- Ministry and Departments: Energy
- In office 6 June 2018 – 23 July 2019
- Governor: Vajubhai Vala
- Cabinet: Second Kumaraswamy ministry
- Chief Minister: H. D. Kumaraswamy
- Ministry and Departments: IT, BT, Science & Technology and Large & Medium Scale Industries
- In office 2013–2016
- Governor: Vajubhai Vala
- Cabinet: First Siddaramaiah ministry
- Chief Minister: Siddaramaiah
- Ministry and Departments: Bengaluru Development and Town Planning and (31 October 2015 - 18 July 2016); Home (20 May 2013 - 29 October 2015)
- Preceded by: R. Ashoka (Home)
- Succeeded by: G. Parameshwara (Home)

Member of Karnataka Legislative Assembly
- Incumbent
- Assumed office 25 May 2008
- Preceded by: Constituency established
- Constituency: Sarvagnanagar

Personal details
- Born: Kelachandra Joseph George; 24 August 1949 (age 77) Chingavanam, Travancore (now in Kottayam, Kerala, India)
- Party: Indian National Congress
- Spouse: Suja George
- Children: 2
- Profession: Politician (1969–present)

Kelachandra Joseph George (born 24 August 1949) is an Indian politician from Karnataka. He is currently serving as Cabinet Minister of Energy & Tourism in Government of Karnataka and as a member of Karnataka Legislative Assembly representing Sarvagnanagar.

He was a minister of large and medium size industry in the cabinet of H D Kumaraswamy and was the Minister for Bengaluru Development and Town Planning. He was previously the Home Minister of Karnataka. He was also the Minister of State (Independent Charge) Transport, Food and Civil Supplies in the Veerendra Patil government and Cabinet Minister for Housing & Urban Development in the S. Bangarappa government.

== Early life ==
George was born on 24 August 1949 to K. C. Joseph and Mariamma Joseph of Chingavanam, in the Kingdom of Travancore (now in Kottayam district, Kerala). His family moved to the Kodagu district of Karnataka in the 1960s. He spent most of his childhood there before relocating to Bangalore. Joseph and his sons founded the Kelachandra Group in 1980. George is married to Suja and has two children.

== Political career ==
1. K. J. George joined the Indian National Congress in 1968. His political career started in 1969 when he was elected as the President of the Gonikoppal Town Youth Congress. During 1971–1972, he was the President of the Virajpet Taluk Youth Congress Committee.
2. From 1972 to 1973 he was the General of the Coorg District Youth Congress Committee and the President of this forum from 1973 to 1975.
3. In 1975 and through 1978 he became the Treasurer of the Karnataka Pradesh Youth Congress Committee.
4. In 1982, he was the General Secretary of the All India Youth Congress Committee where he served till 1985. He later served as the General Secretary- Karnataka Pradesh Congress Committee during and under the Presidentships of K. H Ranganath, N. Dharam Singh, S. M. Krishna, V. S. Kaujalgi, Allum Veerabhadrappa, Mallikarjun Kharge, Oscar Fernandes, Veerendra Patil and Janardhana Poojary.
5. In 1985, he was elected from the erstwhile Bharatinagar Assembly Constituency and became an MLA through 1994.
6. From 1985 to 1989, he was also the Secretary of the Congress Legislature Party. During the late 1980s and early 1990s, he was the Minister of State (Independent Charge) Transport, Food and Civil Supplies under Chief Minister Veerendra Patil and Cabinet Minister for Housing and Urban Development under Chief Minister Bangarappa.
7. Currently, he is a State Election Commission Member, the General Secretary K.P.C.C., a Member of the A.I.C.C. and Working Committee Member All India I.N.T.U.C.

K. J. George won from the Sarvagnanagar constituency at the assembly elections in 2013 by polling in 69,673 votes against his nearest rival Padmanabha Reddy of the Bharatiya Janata Party. During his tenure, the Bangalore Political Action Committee (B.PAC) rated him the best among legislators of Bangalore, using data sets available in the public domain (Attendance in assembly, Starred questions, Unstarred questions, Percentage of MLALAD fund utilization, Perception survey, Educational qualification, Criminal record and Social Media etc.).

In 2018 Assembly Polls, George won from the Sarvagnanagar constituency by a margin of over 53,000 votes against Bhartiya Janta Party’s MN Reddy who stood a distant second. He won 2023 elections in urban Bengaluru with 55,768 lead.
