= 1974 railway strike in India =

Strike by the workers of Indian Railways

Railway Strike 1974
- Date: 8 May 1974 - 27 May 1974
- Location: India
- Caused by: Stagnant long working hours of locomotive staff
- Goals: Eight-hour working day for locomotive staff
- Methods: Strike
- Result: suppression and failure

Parties
All India Railwaymen's Federation	Indian Railway Board

The 1974 railway strike in India was a major strike by the workers of Indian Railways in 1974. The strike lasted from 8 to 27 May 1974. The 20-day strike by 1.7 million workers is the largest recorded industrial action in the world.

== Reasons for the strike ==
The strike was held to demand an eight-hour working day for locomotive staff by the All India Railwaymen's Federation a raise in pay scale, which had remained stagnant over many years, in spite of the fact that pay scales of other government-owned entities had risen over the years. Furthermore, since British times the Railways termed the work of the locomotive staff as "continuous", implying that workers would have to remain at work as long as the train ran on its trip, often for several days at a stretch. The independence of India did not change this. The eight-hour work day had not been implemented in Indian railways by the Railway Board, a quasi-government bureaucracy despite having become a free country in 1947; this had led to dissatisfaction among workers, especially locomotive pilots. Traditional railway union leaders too were starting to get distant from worker demands and closer instead to politicians, thus leading to further discord.

The spread of diesel engines and the consequent intensification of work in the Indian Railways since the 1960s resulted in continuous working hours being extended by days, creating much resentment among the workers. The Railways, although government-owned, remained an organization in which the accepted worldwide standard of an eight-hour working day was violated with impunity. When the crafts unions raised the issue, they demanded a 12-hour working day for loco running staff. This led to railway strikes by rail workers across the country in 1967, 1968, 1970 and 1973, finally leading to the 1974 strike which was joined by 70% of the permanent workforce of railways. This was not the first railways strike in India, the earliest having occurred in British India in 1862 in Howrah, and a number of strikes having occurred in the private railway companies that operated in British India, most of them becoming part of the Indian freedom struggle.

As President of the All India Railwaymen's Federation, George Fernandes led the strike.

== Culmination ==
The strike commenced on 8 May 1974. The strike was brutally suppressed by the Indira Gandhi government with thousands being sent to jail and losing their jobs. The strike was called off on 27 May 1974.
