= Hind Mazdoor Sabha =

Trade union in India

Hind Mazdoor Sabha (HMS)
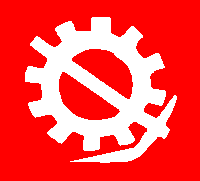
- Abbreviation: HMS
- Formation: 29 December 1948
- Founder: Basawon Singh, Ashoka Mehta, R.S. Ruikar, Maniben Kara, Shibnath Banerjee, R.A. Khedgikar, T.S. Ramanujam, V.S. Mathur, G.G. Mehta.
- Type: Trade union
- Headquarters: New Delhi
- Members: 3.3 million
- Leader: Harbhajan Singh (General Secretary) & C.A. Rajasridhar (President)
- Affiliations: ITUC
- Website: www.hindmazdoorsabha.co.in

The Hind Mazdoor Sabha (HMS) was formed by the Socialists in 1948 but has little real connection with the Socialist Party. It is one of the least political and most pragmatic trade-union federations in India. The HMS is affiliated with the International Confederation of Free Trade Unions.

== History ==
The HMS was founded in Howrah in West Bengal on 29 December 1948, by socialists, All India Forward Bloc followers and independent unionists. Its founders included Basawon Singh (Sinha), Ashoka Mehta, R.S. Ruikar, Maniben Kara, Sibnath Banerjee, R.A. Khedgikar, T.S. Ramanujam, V.S. Mathur, G.G. Mehta. R.S. Ruikar was elected president and Ashok Mehta general secretary. HMS absorbed the Royist Indian Federation of Labour and the Hind Mazdoor Panchayat, which was formed in 1948 by socialists leaving the increasingly communist dominated AITUC. In March 1949, HMS claimed to have 380 affiliated unions with a combined membership of 618,802.

== Membership ==
According to provisional statistics from the Ministry of Labour, HMS had a membership of 3,342,213 in 2002 (13% of the total trade union membership in the country).

All India Railwaymen's Federation, the largest trade union in the Indian Railways with a membership of 1.4 million is affiliated with Hind Mazdoor Sabha. All India Port and Dock Workers Federation, the largest trade union representing workers at India's 12 major government-owned ports is also affiliated with the Hind Mazdoor Sabha.

== International affiliations ==
In 1949 HMS became a founding member of the ICFTU. Currently, it is affiliated with the International Trade Union Confederation.
