= The Claridges =

5-star hotel in Lutyens Delhi

The Claridges, New Delhi

General information
- Location: 12 Aurangzeb Road, New Delhi
- Opening: 1955
- Owner: Suresh Nanda

Technical details
- Floor count: 3

Other information
- Number of rooms: 132

Website
- https://www.claridges.com/

The Claridges is a luxury hotel in New Delhi. Consisting of 132 rooms, it is located on Aurangzeb Road in Lutyens' Delhi, the capital's British-constructed administrative precinct. Built in 1955, the hotel's interior depicts historical artwork of royal India and is surrounded with lush green lawns and has been an important relic of independent India.

The hotel is spread across 3 acres of land, boasting of a low-rise building spanning three floors, and is bifurcated into two wings. It has an outdoor swimming pool, seven restaurants, a shopping arcade, health club, and art galleries.

In 2003, the hotel's ownership was changed, which was arranged by its chairman Suresh Nanda.

== Restaurants ==
=== Sevilla ===
Sevilla is a Spanish-themed restaurant in Claridges, which serves pizzas, tapas, paella and house special sangrias.

=== Dhaba By Claridges ===
Dhaba is a Punjabi highway themed restaurant serving rustic Indian cuisine. Sanjeev Nanda, CEO of The Claridges, sold the restaurant to Azure Hospitality in 2016.
