= All India Railwaymen's Federation =

Trade union in India

- Founded: 16 February 1925
- Headquarters: Railway Colony, Paharganj, New Delhi, Delhi 110002, India
- Location: India
- Key people: N. Kanniah, President
- Website: https://www.airfindia.org/

The All India Railwaymen's Federation (AIRF) is the largest trade union of Indian Railways workers with a membership of 1.4 million. AIRF was founded on 16 February 1925. It is affiliated with the socialist trade union centre Hind Mazdoor Sabha.

By the late 1940s, AIRF had begun to be dominated by socialists and communists. The union's president between 1947 and 1953 was the socialist Jayaprakash Narayan, while the future communist chief minister of West Bengal, Jyoti Basu was vice-president. Worried by this, the ruling Congress Party formed its own railway wing, the Indian National Railway Workers' Federation (INRWF) in 1948. In March 1949, AIRF was set to launch a strike but withdrew the strike notice after the government attempted conciliation. The communist wing of the union attempted to continue staging strikes. The government launched a crackdown. Troops were deployed, 7,000 workers were arrested and 2,000 were dismissed. Communist-linked unions and members were expelled from the union.In 1953, AIRF merged with INRWF to form the National Federation of Indian Railwaymen. This unity was short-lived and AIRF became independent again in 1955. Despite favouritism towards the Congress-aligned unions by the Indian Railways management, AIRF continued to maintain strong influence among railway workers.

Past AIRF presidents include Venkat Varah Giri (V. V. Giri, Ex President of India) Peter Alvares (1968–1973), George Fernandes (1973–1976), Priya Gupta (1976–1979) Umraomal Purohit (1979–2014) and Rakhal Dasgupta (2014-2020).

In May 1974, AIRF President George Fernandes led a nationwide railway strike that was suppressed by the Government of India. The strike lasted from 8 to 27 May 1974. The 20-day strike by 1.7 million (17 lakh) workers is the largest recorded industrial action in the world.

In 2007, Indian Railways was ordered by courts to hold secret ballot elections for the first time to determine union representation in each of its seventeen zones. The court case was precipitated by the then Bharatiya Janata Party-led government's decision in 2002 to unilaterally grant recognition to its affiliate Bharatiya Mazdoor Sangh. The criteria for recognition in a zone was 35% of the votes polled or 30% of the total electorate in a given zone. Unions winning over 50% of the votes would become the only recognized union. The elections saw AIRF emerge as the largest union, winning recognition in sixteen zones, including becoming the sole recognized union in four. NFIR affiliated with INTUC won recognition in nine. In the second elections held in 2013, AIRF again won recognition in sixteen zones, five as sole representative whereas NFIR won recognition in twelve.

AIRF is led by President N. Kanniah and General Secretary Shiva Gopal Mishra.
