= Lawrence Fernandes =

Socialist political leader from India

Lawrence Fernandes (1932-14 November 2005) was a socialist political leader from India. He was brother of George Fernandes.

Lawrence Fernandes was born on 1932 to John Joseph Fernandes and Alice Martha Fernandes (née Pinto), in Mangalore to a Mangalorean Catholic family. He was the second of six children, his siblings are George, Michael, Paul, Aloysius, and Richard.

During the Emergency, he was arrested on 1 May 1976 by the Government and brutally tortured and held in illegal custody before being transferred to the Bangalore Central Jail, to extract from him whereabouts of his elder brother George Fernandes. Madhu Dandavate, who was arrested and was in the same jail wrote a letter to Indira Gandhi that he is being inhumanely tortured and may even die. Even Lal Krishna Advani in his book mentions about torture Lawrence had to go through in jail during the Emergency. He was continuously beaten up leading to several fractures all over his body. At the time of his release at end of the Emergency he looked like a live skeleton. He was reduced to a mental and physical wreck in jail and after his release at the end of Emergency he lived many years as a wreck.

Lawrence later said

I did not break down despite third degree methods used by police. I was prepared to rather die than betray George and others.

He served as former Mayor of Bangalore in 1980 and as a corporator of the Richmond Town ward before 1980. In 1987-88 he unsuccessfully contested as a Janata Dal candidate for the Bangalore North Lok Sabha Constituency.

He died at Bangalore on 14 November 2005.

Lawrence Fernandes Foundation for the welfare and benefit of the poor and need was launched in his memory by his brothers George Fernandes, Michael, Aloysius and others.

== See also ==
- Snehalatha Reddy
- Michael Fernandes
