= Operation West End =

2001 exposé of Indian governmental corruption by Tehelka magazine

Operation West End was a sting operation conducted in 2001 by Indian news magazine Tehelka to expose corruption in defence deals conducted by the Bharatiya Janata Party (BJP)-led NDA government of Atal Bihari Vajpayee. Over a seven-and-half-month investigation, special correspondents of the magazine filmed several corrupt defence officials and politicians of NDA government, including the BJP President Bangaru Laxman, accepting bribes and discussing kickbacks. During Operation West End, individuals filmed in the sting operation made allegations and claims of who the most powerful arms dealers or agents in India were. Vipin Khanna, Sudhir Choudhrie and Suresh Nanda faced allegations and claims of being the three most powerful arms dealers in India.

== Sting operation ==
The magazine created a fictitious London-based arms manufacturing company called 'West End International'. Investigative journalists from the magazine would get in touch with junior officers of the Indian defence establishment and move upwards.

The operation started with Senior Section Officer P. Sashi Menon who was posted in the Ministry of Defence. After getting some monetary incentive, P. Sashi Menon took the team to Brigadier Anil Sehgal’s house in New Delhi. Sehgal was then the Deputy Director in Directorate General of Ordnance and Supply (DGOS) in the Indian Army, an important army procurement post. Sashi Menon and Sehgal provided the Tehelka team with information about the defence products being but the army and instructions on how to proceed in order to sell their products.

Brigadier Sehgal demanded to be entertained in a five-star hotel to which the team agreed. He also brought in Lt. Colonel Sharma, who was an army officer posted in procurement section of the Indian Air Force. procurement section. After the meeting, Brigadier Sehgal demanded Rs. 200,000 to give documents related to the procurement of hand-held thermal cameras and other equipment that the company might be interested in supplying to the Indian Army. After accepting the money he also advised on how to proceed in the matter of bidding for the hand-held thermal cameras. During the conversation, Brigadier Sehgal said that the company would have to pay to everyone and some percentage would also reach the then Defence Minister George Fernandes. P. Sashi Menon also provided confidential documents related to the procurement of ammunition, tubes, clothing and helicopters.

On 26 November 2000, the team was introduced to Deepak Gupta, the son of Rashtriya Swayamsevak Sangh (RSS) trustee R. K. Gupta. Deepak Gupta assured that he would help the UK based company bag the project and talked about his influence in the government. In the subsequent meetings he elaborated on his functioning and said that he worked from the Prime Minister's Office (PMO).

The team then met R. K. Gupta, the RSS trustee and a big defence middleman. He was quite vocal about his relationship with the Prime Minister Atal Bihari Vajpayee and Lal Krishna Advani and said that both of them were tenants at his properties. He had also helped establish the RSS headquarters in 1967 in Jhandewala, Delhi. He assured the team that he will get their work done and will pay the bribes on their behalf to the Defence Secretary, Joint Secretary, Under Secretary, BJP treasurer Ved Prakash Goyal, and president Bangaru Laxman. He did not want to involve Brajesh Mishra as his price was rupees one crore.

On 23 December 2000, journalists posing as representatives of the arms manufacturing company held their first meeting with the then BJP chief Bangaru Laxman. They then met him several times over the period of one week and promised to compensate him for his recommendation to the Defence Ministry on the supply of hand-held thermal imagers. On 1 January 2001, Laxman accepted one lakh rupees at the BJP’s office for pursuing their proposal. On 7 January 2001, the final meeting held between the fake representatives and Laxman.

== Bribes paid ==
The bribes paid during the operation:

- P. Sashi Menon, Senior Section Officer, Directorate General of Ordnance and Supply (DGOS) – Rs. 52,000.
- Brigadier Anil Sehgal, Director, Directorate General of Ordnance and Supply (DGOS) – Rs. 40,000.
- Brigadier Iqbal Singh, Prospective Procurement Officer (PPO) – Rs. 50,000.
- Lt. Colonel (Retd.) Sayal, former officer in the Directorate General of Ordnance and Supply (DGOS) and a defence middleman – Rs. 80,000.
- Major General (Retd.) S. P. Murgai, retired Additional Director General, Quality Assurance – Rs. 1,40,000.
- Narendra Singh – Rs. 10,000
- H. C. Pant, Deputy Secretary, Ministry of Defence – Rs. 60,000.
- Jaya Jaitly, president of Samta Party and partner of Defence Minister George Fernandes – Rs. 2,00,000
- R. K. Jain, treasurer of Samta Party – Rs. 50,000.
- Bangaru Laxman, president of Bharatiya Janata Party – Rs. 1,00,000.
- Sathyamurthi, secretary to Bangaru Laxman – A gold chain.
- Raju Venkatesh, secretary to Bangaru Laxman – Rs. 10,000.
- Surendra Sulekha, industrialist from Kanpur – Rs. 1,00,000.
- Major General Choudary, Additional Director General, Weapons and Equipment (ADE, W.E.) – Rs. 1,00,000 and a gold chain.
- Suresh – Rs. 7,000
- Raghupati – Rs. 16,000

== Aftermath ==
On 13 March 2001, Tehelka released video CDs of the sting operation that led to political storm in India. Bangaru Laxman had to resign from the position of BJP president. It emerged that the defence deals were not driven by considerations of national security, but by the greed of political and bureaucratic people. The defence minister George Fernandes was forced to resign. Jaya Jaitly resigned as president of the Samta party. Mamata Banerjee, an important ally of the coalition quit the government.

In Operation West End, individuals captured in the sting operation made claims and accusations regarding the identities of the most power arms dealers or agents in India. Among those named in the allegations, Vipin Khanna, Sudhir Choudhrie, and Suresh Nanda were alleged to be the three most powerful arms dealers or agents in the country. Others named in the allegations as allegedly smaller arms dealers were Mohinder Singh Sahani and R.K. Gupta. These individuals were later investigated due to the allegations and claims made against them in Operation West End.

The government booked Tehelka under many sections and used Inland Revenue, Enforcement Directorate and Intelligence Bureau but could not find anything. Investors of the website were also investigated and Tehelka’s financer Shanker Sharma was imprisoned without any charge. The journalists who carried out the investigation were also imprisoned.

== Court judgement ==
On 27 April 2012, a special CBI court convicted Bangaru Laxman of corruption charges. The next day, the court sentenced him to four years imprisonment and also imposed a fine of one lakh rupees.

== Controversy ==
The investigation into the sting operation took a dramatic turn when it was revealed that prostitutes were supplied to three defence officials. Both the BJP and Samata Party condemned it and raised the questions on ethical side of investigative journalism. However, Aniruddh Bahal, the journalist who was a part of the operation said, "When the demand came from armymen (to have prostitutes) we were foxed. We resisted it. We were baffled. But the demand was so forceful we could not proceed further without catering to their demand." They decided to provide prostitutes to show that officials were ready to go to any level.
