= Ammembala Balappa =

Indian freedom fighter and socialist leader

- Born: 23 February 1922; Bantwal, Dakshina Kannada, British India
- Died: 15 May 2014 (aged 92)
- Occupations: Activist, teacher, journalist
- Movement: Quit India Movement
- Father: Thaniya Moolya
- Awards: Swarna Swathanthrya by the Government of Karnataka

Ammembala Balappa (23 February 1922 – 15 May 2014) was an Indian freedom fighter and socialist leader who is known for participating in the Quit India Movement in 1942. He played an important role in drafting the Declaration of land policy (Land Reforms Act) by the D. Devaraj Urs government during prime minister Indira Gandhi's tenure. He is also credited for founding the first Tulu language newspaper Tulu Siri in 1970.

== Biography ==
Ammembala Balappa was born in Bantwal taluk of Dakshina Kannada on 23 February 1922. His father Thaniya Moolya died in childhood, his mother shifted to another village along with her children including Balappa.

Balappa was born in a family of potters at a time when casteism was at its peak and prevented him from studying after attending classes for just six months in Class I. Then he shifted to Mangalore to his uncle's home. Balappa was joined to work as a helper in a British officer, who was in-charge of administrative affairs in Mangalore.His work pleased the officer and helped him get a job in sanitation department. He also learnt to speak and read English.

At the age of 20, he took inspiration from Mahatma Gandhi and jumped into India's freedom struggle during the Quit India Movement in 1942. With the help of some of his friends, he planted a crude bomb that burnt down the office of the District Court Complex at Light House Hill Road in Bavutagudde of Mangalore. He was arrested and jailed in Vellore Central Prison, where he shared a ward with P. V. Narasimha Rao (who later became Prime Minister of India). He learnt to speak and read the Hindi language from PV Narasimha Rao and got in touch with Pandit Jawaharlal Nehru and Jayaprakash Narayan.

On 15 August 1947 Balappa hoisted tricolour flag at Sultan bateri watch tower in Mangalore.

Later, he opened a school in a remote village in southern Karnataka, where he worked as a Hindi teacher during the Unification movement. He became involved in the labour movement in Mangalore, started cooperative banks to help rural folk. He was one of the main contributors to the Declaration of Land Policy (Land reforms Act) by the D. Devaraj Urs's government during PM Indira Gandhi's tenure.

Balappa was also recognized as a journalist, as he published a Kannada language newspaper called Mithra in the year 1952. He also started the first Tulu language newspaper Tulu Siri in 1970. Mangalorean Author Chris Emmanuel Dsouza makes a point in his book Bandh Samrat about Balappa's initial days of Trade union activism, he nurtured and mentored George Fernandes in Nehru Maidan, George later went on to become a supreme Trade union leader in Bombay and a Union Minister. Balappa was George Fernandes's first guru.They also organised one of the first labour strikes in Mangalore City when they called on strike against Canara Public Conveyance.

Proficient in Tulu, Konkani, English, Kannada and Hindi languages, he worked as a Hindi teacher in Karkala during Unification movement.

Balappa founded Bantwal Society Service Co-operative Bank in 1980, to provide financial assistance to the rural folks. He had also served as a member of the Land Justice Board between 1975 and 1977, 1980–1983, 1985–1988. He was a member of the Karnataka state government's Backward Class Commission and Mangalore University Academy Council member from 1982 to 1992.

He was also the founder of Samaja Seva Sahakari Bank of Bantwal.

This bank was started with only 131 members with a share capital of INR 22.620 /- (Twenty six rupee and sixty two paisa only).

In 1989, he rejected offer from JD(S) to contest from Bantwal constituency.

He was honoured with the 'Swarna Swathanthrya' award by the State Government of Karnataka on the occasion of the 50th year of Indian Independence in 1997.

Balappa was also guru of trade unionist and union minister George Fernandes.

== Death ==
At the age of 93, he died on 15 May 2014 in Mangalore.
