= Indian Federation of Labour =

Former trade union federation in India

Indian Federation of Labour is a federation of trade unions in India. IFL was founded in 1941 by M.N. Roy, after a split from the All India Trade Union Congress. IFL strongly supported the British war effort. Maniben Kara was a prominent IFL leader in the railways and V.B. Karnik was a prominent IFL leader amongst the dock workers.

In 1944 IFL was widely discredited as it was revealed that the organisation had received funding from the British authorities. IFL was able to retain some influence in Bombay and maintained contacts in scattered pockets. After the war, both AITUC and IFL were recognised by the government, for the purpose of representing Indian labour in the ILO.

In 1945, A.K. Pillai spoke on behalf of the Federation in London at the World Trade Union Conference.

In December 1948 IFL merged into the Hind Mazdoor Sabha.
