= Bhanu Choudhrie =

Indian-born businessman (born 1978)

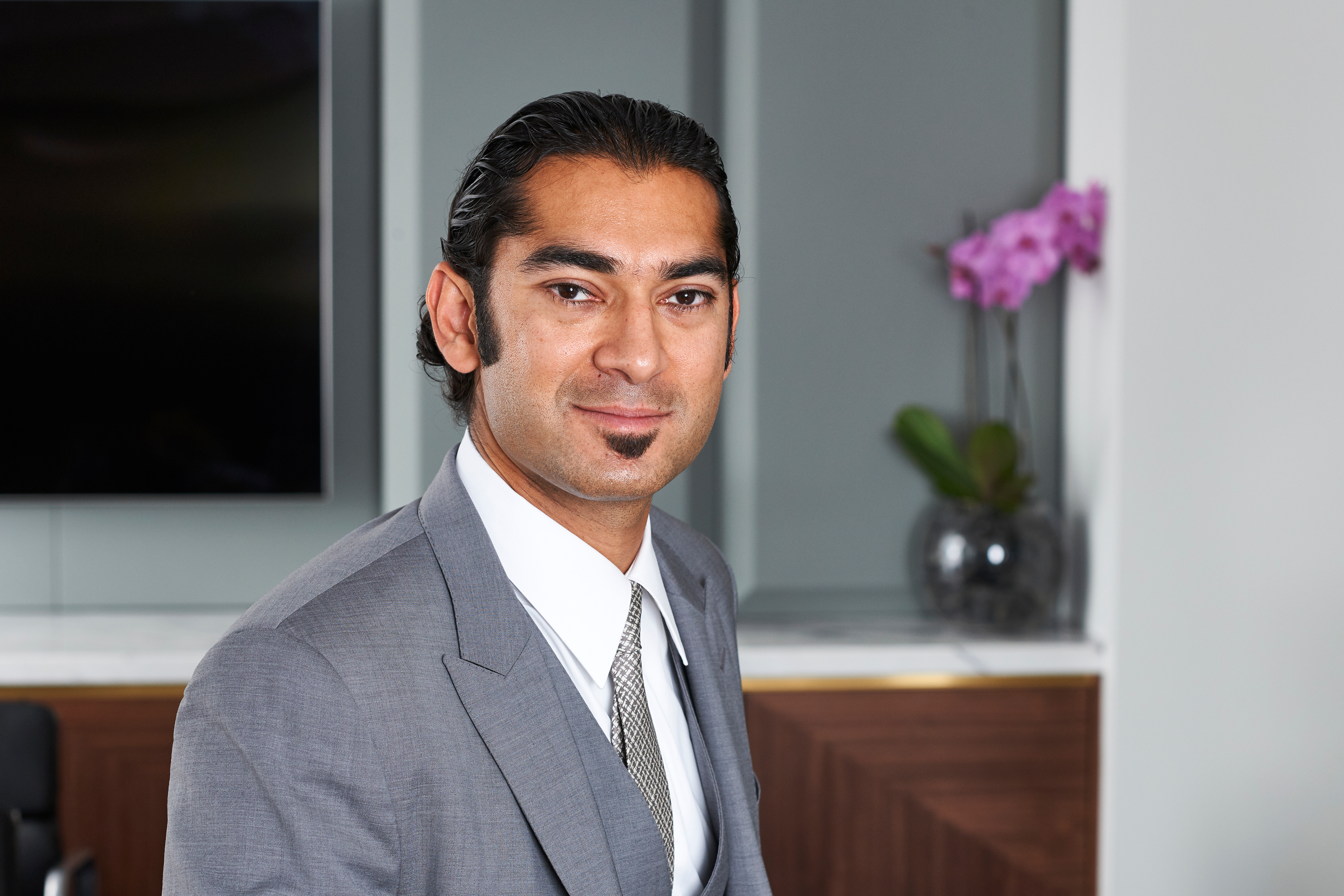
- Bhanu Choudhrie, June 2019
- Born: June 1978 (age 48); New Delhi, India
- Citizenship: British
- Education: University of Boston
- Occupation: Businessman
- Title: Executive director, C&C Alpha Group
- Spouse: Simrin Choudhrie (div. 2020)
- Children: 2
- Parent: Sudhir Choudhrie

Bhanu Choudhrie (born June 1978) is an Indian-born businessman based in the United Kingdom. He is the founder and executive director of C&C Alpha Group.

== Early life ==
Bhanu Choudhrie is the son of Sudhir Choudhrie and his wife Anita. He was born in New Delhi, India in June 1978 and moved to the UK in 2000. He was educated at the Boston University.

== Career ==
Choudhrie has been the executive director of the C&C Alpha Group since 2001.

In 2006, Choudhrie founded Alpha Aviation Group, an international pilot training provider training pilots for leading regional airlines, including Air Arabia, VietJet and Cebu Pacific.

Choudhrie is a director of the charity, Path To Success, founded by his mother Anita in 2005. It is known for its work helping disabled athletes. In 2018, it sponsored female athletes from Para Badminton, Para Powerlifting, Wheelchair Tennis and Wheelchair Basketball, who aspired to represent Team GB at the Tokyo Olympics.

In 2014, Choudhrie and his father Sudhir Choudhrie were arrested by the UK's Serious Fraud Office (SFO) in connection with its investigation into bribery in Rolls-Royce's overseas business. Both denied any wrongdoing and were released without charge. In February 2019, the SFO closed its inquiries into Choudhrie and his father without bringing charges.

He was a director of Atlantic Coast Financial Corporation, prior to its acquisition by Ameris in May 2018. Choudhrie was a co-founder of Megalith Capital Management.

== Personal life ==
Choudhrie lives in a £20 million Grade II listed house in London's Belgravia, with his son, who was born in February 2011.

Choudhrie has been a political supporter of the UK Liberal Democrats and donated to the Party prior to the 2010 General Election. In May 2020, Choudhrie's ex-wife Simrin was awarded a £60 million divorce settlement in London's High Court.

Since 2020, Choudhrie has been in a relationship with Australian fashion designer Tamara Ralph, the co-founder of British fashion house Ralph & Russo. They have a child together who was born on 28 January 2021.
