= International Ferro Metals =

International Ferro Metals Ltd
- Type: Public
- Traded as: LSE: IFL
- Industry: Mining
- Founded: 2002
- Headquarters: Sydney, Australia
- Key people: Anthony Grey, Chairman; Chris Jordaan, CEO; Xiaoping Yang, executive director
- Revenue: ZAR1,919.4 million (2008)
- Operating income: ZAR728.5 million (2008)
- Net income: ZAR578.2 million (2008)
- Website: www.ifml.com

International Ferro Metals (LSE: IFL) is a leading Australian-based ferrochrome producer operating in South Africa. Its product is used in stainless steel manufacturing. Listed on the London Stock Exchange, it is a former constituent of the FTSE 250 Index.

== History ==
The business was founded in 2002. It was first listed on the Alternative Investment Market in 2005. The listing process was initiated after the company gained investment from its strategic investor, also its single largest shareholder, Jiuquan Iron and steel (Group) Company (JISCO), who now takes an equity interests of approximately 26.1% of the enlarged share capital of the company. Construction on the production facility at Buffelsfontein in South Africa started in 2005 and it went into full production in 2007. It transferred to the full list of the London Stock Exchange in 2007.

During the year of 2008 as a result of booming commodity market and appetite for ferrochromes worldwide especially in China IFL recognized a net profit after tax of ZAR578.2 million and the company declared its maiden dividend of 1 pence per share.

== Operations ==
The company was two facilities:

- Buffelsfontein - in production
- Lesedi - under construction
