= All India Port and Dock Workers Federation =

Trade union in India

All India Port and Dock Workers Federation (AIPDWF), founded in 1949 is the largest trade union representing workers at India's 12 major government-owned ports. It is affiliated with the socialist trade union center Hind Mazdoor Sabha.

The union split in 1989 during a nationwide strike by port workers. The previous agreement between the port unions and the government had expired in January 1988. Frustrated with the lack of progress in negotiations, AIPDWF, as well as unions affiliated with INTUC and AITUC launched a strike in June 1989. After four days, a breakaway faction led by Shanti Patel, called off the strike and gained recognition from the government. AIPDWF ended its strike after another two days.

In recent times, AIPDWF has become a vocal opponent of the Indian government's plan to corporatize the various publicly owned ports, viewing the step as a give-away of public property to private firms.
