= George Fernandes =

Indian trade unionist and politician (1930–2019)

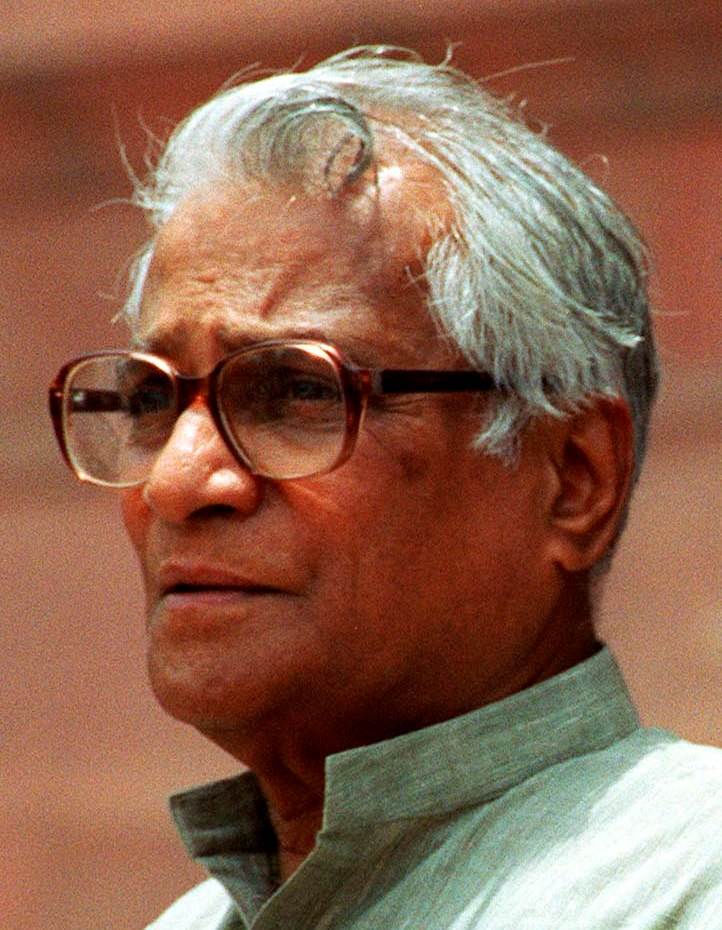
- Fernandes in 2002

Union Minister of Defence
- In office 21 October 2001 – 22 May 2004
- Prime Minister: Atal Bihari Vajpayee
- Preceded by: Jaswant Singh
- Succeeded by: Pranab Mukherjee
- In office 19 March 1998 – 16 March 2001
- Prime Minister: Atal Bihari Vajpayee
- Preceded by: Mulayam Singh Yadav
- Succeeded by: Jaswant Singh

Union Minister of Railways
- In office 2 December 1989 – 10 November 1990
- Prime Minister: V. P. Singh
- Preceded by: Madhav Rao Scindia
- Succeeded by: Janeshwar Mishra

Member of Parliament, Rajya Sabha
- In office 4 August 2009 – 7 July 2010
- Constituency: Bihar

Member of Parliament, Lok Sabha
- In office 16 May 2004 — 16 May 2009
- Preceded by: Jai Narain Prasad Nishad
- Succeeded by: Jai Narain Prasad Nishad
- In office 28 November 1989 — 9 May 1996
- Preceded by: Laliteshwar Prasad Shahi
- Succeeded by: Jai Narain Prasad Nishad
- In office 22 March 1977 — 28 December 1984
- Preceded by: Nawal Kishore Sinha
- Succeeded by: Laliteshwar Prasad Shahi
- Constituency: Muzaffarpur, Bihar
- In office 10 May 1996 – 16 May 2004
- Preceded by: Vijay Kumar Yadav
- Succeeded by: Nitish Kumar
- Constituency: Nalanda, Bihar
- In office 26 March 1967 – 27 March 1971
- Preceded by: Sadashiv Kanoji Patil
- Succeeded by: Kailas Narain Narula Shivnarain
- Constituency: Mumbai South, Maharashtra

Personal details
- Born: George Mathew Fernandes; 3 June 1930 Mangalore, Madras Presidency, British India (present-day Mangaluru, Karnataka, India)
- Died: 29 January 2019 (aged 88) New Delhi, Delhi, India
- Party: Praja Socialist Party (before 1967); Samyukta Socialist Party (1967–73); Socialist Party (1973–77); Janata Party (1977-79); Janata Party (S) (1979–80); Janata Party (1980–88); Janata Dal (1988–94); Samata Party (1994–2003); Janata Dal (U) (2003–19)
- Other political affiliations: National Democratic Alliance
- Spouse: Leila Kabir (m. 1971)
- Children: 1
- Awards: Padma Vibhushan (2020) (posthumously)

George Mathew Fernandes (3 June 1930 – 29 January 2019) was an Indian politician, trade unionist, statesman, and journalist, who served as the Minister of Defence (India) from 1998 until 2004. A veteran socialist, he was a member of the Lok Sabha for over 30 years, starting from Mumbai in 1967 till 2009 mostly representing constituencies from Bihar. He was the leader of the Samyukta Socialist Party and the Socialist Party, a key member of the Janata Party, the Janata Party (Secular) and the Janata Dal, and, finally, the founder of the Samata Party. Holding several prominent ministerial portfolios during his career, including communication, industry, railways, and defence, he was posthumously awarded the Padma Vibhushan, India's second highest civilian award, in 2020.

A native of Mangaluru, Fernandes was sent to Bengaluru in 1946 to be trained as a priest. In 1949, he moved to Mumbai, where he joined the socialist trade union movement. Becoming a trade union leader, Fernandes organised many strikes and bandhs in Mumbai in the 1950s and 1960s while working with the Indian Railways. He defeated S. K. Patil of the Indian National Congress in the 1967 parliamentary elections from the Mumbai South Lok Sabha constituency. As president of the All India Railwaymen's Federation, he led the 1974 railways strike. Fernandes went underground during the Emergency era of 1975, while challenging Prime Minister of India Indira Gandhi for imposing a state of emergency, but in 1976 he was arrested and tried in the infamous Baroda dynamite case.

In 1977, after the Emergency had been lifted, Fernandes won the Muzaffarpur Lok Sabha constituency seat in Bihar in absentia. As industries minister, he revoked the licences for multinationals IBM and Coca-Cola to operate in India, due to investment violations. As railways minister from 1989 to 1990 he was the driving force behind the Konkan Railway project. As defence minister in the Bharatiya Janata Party-led Second and Third Vajpayee ministry (1998–2004), he oversaw the outbreak of the Kargil War and the implementation of nuclear tests at Pokhran. Fernandes has been dogged by various controversies, including the Barak Missile scandal and the Tehelka affair. George Fernandes won nine Lok Sabha elections from 1967 to 2004. He died on 29 January 2019 at the age of 88.

== Early life ==
George Fernandes was born on 3 June 1930 to John Joseph Fernandes and Alice Martha Fernandes (née Pinto), in Mangalore to a Mangalorean Catholic family. The eldest of six sons, his brothers are Lawrence, Michael, Paul, Aloysius, and Richard. His mother was a great admirer of King George V (who was also born on 3 June), so she named her first son George. His father was employed by the Peerless Finance group as an insurance executive, and headed their office of South India for several years. George was fondly called "Gerry" in close family circles. He attended his first few years of schooling at a government school near his house called "Board school", a municipal school and a church school.

He studied from fifth grade at the school attached to St. Aloysius College, Mangalore, where he completed his Secondary School Leaving Certificate (SSLC).

In an interview with ETV, Fernandes described his decision to stop studies after matriculation despite his father wishing him to study and become a lawyer. His premise was that he did not want to become a lawyer and fight cases for his father who often evicted tenants from a patch of land that they owned on the outskirts of Mangalore. He was instead enrolled in a seminary for studies to become a priest. He went to St Peter's Seminary in Bangalore at the age of 16, to be trained as a Roman Catholic priest, studying philosophy for two and a half years from 1946 to 1948. At the age of 19, he left the seminary due to sheer frustration because he was appalled that the rectors ate better food and sat at higher tables than the seminarians. He later confessed that, "I was disillusioned, because there was a lot of difference between precept and practice where the Church was concerned."

Fernandes began work at the age of 19, organising exploited workers in the road transport industry and in the hotels and restaurants in Mangalore. For some time, he worked as an insurance agent and also tried wholesale businesses of shaving blades. His first guru was a Mangalorean activist and a freedom fighter Ammembala Balappa (1922–2014). Balappa identified and groomed a young Fernandes, who had taken refuge at places surrounding Nehru Maidan in Mangalore city, after being thrown out of the house. Initially, with Balappa's mentorship Fernandes gathered hotel workers and other menial labourers in the city. He was associated with Ram Manohar Lohia-led Praja Socialist Party (PSP) in its Mangalore division. Fernandes and few other union workers led Mangalore's earliest labour strikes on behalf of the workers of Canara Public Conveyance (CPC)in 1949. The strike was cracked down as the police resorted to lathi charge. After the strike, Fernandes came in contact with renowned Bombay-based Trade Union leader Placid D'Mello (1919–1958). Fernandes later left to Bombay in 1950 and faced tremendous hardships. Here again, he became a protégé of D'Mello, who was handling the arduous Dock unions. After D'Mello's death in 1958, Fernandes succeeded in managing dock Unions and other major labour force unions in the city that included Taximen unions, textile mills and Mazdoor Unions.

== Career ==
=== Brief history of participating in elections ===
He first contested Lok Sabha election in 1967 as a socialist, and defeated the Congress stalwart Sa Kaa Patil in Bombay in a famous upset, earning the sobriquet 'George the Giant-killer'. He contested from Muzaffarpur, Bihar in 1977 while still in jail as a Janata Party candidate, and won. He was made minister in the first non-Congress govt in India. In 1979, he resigned from Janata Party, joined Charan Singh's breakaway Janata Party (S), and won again from Muzaffarpur in 1980. In 1984 he fought from Bangalore on Janata Party's ticket but lost to Jaffar Sharif of Congress. He lost a bye-poll from Banka in 1985 and again in 1986. In 1989 and 1991, he shifted back to Bihar and won both times from Muzaffarpur as Janata Dal candidate. In 1994, he left Janata Dal after differences with Lalu Yadav and formed Samata Party which allied with BJP. In 1996 and 1998 elections, he won from Nalanda as Samata Party candidate. Samata Party merged with Janata Dal (United) and he won again from Nalanda in 1999. In 2004 he won from Muzaffarpur. In 2009 he was denied ticket by his party, contested from Muzaffarpur as an independent and lost. Later he was elected to Rajya Sabha in 2009. In the 2010s he was afflicted for many years with Alzheimer's and died in January 2019.

- Bombay: 1967 (Lost in 1971)
- Muzaffarpur: 1977, 1980, 1989, 1991, 2004. (Lost in 2009 as rebel)
- Bangalore: Lost in 1984
- Banka: Lost bye-polls in 1985 and 1986.
- Nalanda: 1996, 1998, 1999
- Rajya Sabha: 2009

=== Life in Mumbai ===
After leaving the seminary, Fernandes moved to Bombay in 1949 in search of a job. He went to the office of Socialist Party in Bombay and met Madhu Dandavate to ask him for staying there for some time but was not welcomed. His life was tough in Bombay, and he had to sleep on the streets, until he got a job as a proofreader for The Times of India newspaper. He relates to the beginning of his career by saying, "When I came to Bombay, I used to sleep on the benches of Chowpatty Sands. In the middle of the night policemen used to come and wake me up and ask me to move on." He came into contact with veteran union leader Placid D'Mello, and the socialist Rammanohar Lohia, who were the greatest influences on his life. Later, he joined the socialist trade union movement. He rose to prominence as a trade unionist and fought for the rights of labourers in small scale service industries such as hotels and restaurants. Emerging as a key figure in the Bombay labour movement in the early 1950s, Fernandes was a central figure in the unionisation of sections of Bombay labour in the 1950s.

In 1951, Fernandes joined Bombay Dock Worker's Union and worked to revive the publication of a newsletter The Dockman. When in August 1951, Placid D'Mello was arrested, he organised foot march of around two-hundred dock workers from Bombay to Poona to meet Chief Minister Morarji Desai for the release of D'Mello. As a labour organiser, he served many prison terms when his workforce engaged in fights with company goons. He served as a member of the Bombay Municipal Corporation from 1961 to 1968. He won in the civic election in 1961 and, until 1968, continuously raised the problems of the exploited workers in the representative body of the metropolis.

On his first day at Bombay Municipal Corporation, 10 April 1961, he requested that the proceedings to be conducted in Marathi instead of English language. On 4 April 1963, George was arrested along with Sardar Parsbag Singh and Janardhan Upadhyay under Defence of India act because of their demand to change the taxi fair structure. He was jailed at Nasik Central Jail. On 9 August 1963, Madhu Limaye along with other trade union leaders organised a big rally in Bombay for his release. On 13 December 1963, he was released from Nagpur Central Jail.

The moment that thrust Fernandes into the limelight was his decision to contest the 1967 general election. He was offered a party ticket for the Bombay South constituency by the Samyukta Socialist Party against the more well-known S. K. Patil of the Indian National Congress in Bombay. Patil was a seasoned politician, with two decades of experience. Nevertheless, Fernandes won by garnering 48.5 per cent of the votes, thus earning his nickname, "George the Giantkiller". The shocking defeat ended Patil's political career.

Fernandes emerged as a key leader in the upsurge of strike actions in Bombay during the second half of the 1960s but, by the beginnings of the 1970s, the impetus of his leadership had largely disappeared. In 1969, he was chosen General Secretary of the Samyukta Socialist Party, and in 1973 became the chairman of the Socialist Party. After the 1970s, Fernandes failed to make major inroads in Bombay's growing private-sector industries.

=== 1974 railway strike ===
The most notable strike organised by Fernandes, when he was President of the All India Railwaymen's Federation, was the All India Railway strike of 1974, where the entire nation was brought to a halt. The strike was the result of grievances by railway workers that had been built up over two decades before the strike. Though there were three Pay commissions between 1947 and 1974, none of them increased the standard of living of the workers. In February 1974, the National Coordinating Committee for Railwaymen's Struggle (NCCRS) was formed to bring all the railway unions, the central trade unions and political parties in the Opposition together to prepare for the strike to start on 8 May 1974. In Bombay, electricity and transport workers, as well as taxi drivers joined the protests. In Gaya, Bihar, striking workers and their families squatted on the tracks. More than 10,000 workers of the Integral Coach Factory in Madras marched to the Southern Railway headquarters to express their solidarity with the striking workers. Similar protests erupted across the country.

The strike, which started on 8 May 1974, at the time of economic crisis, provoked strong government reactions and massive arrests. According to Amnesty International, 30,000 trade unionists were detained, most held under preventive detention laws. Those arrested included not only members of the strike action committee and trade unionists, but also railwaymen who participated in the strike. The strike was called off unilaterally on 27 May 1974 by the Action Committee. As explained later by Fernandes, "the strike was called off because those conducting the strike had started speaking in different voices." Although large number of prisoners were released, among them Fernandes, thousands remained in detention, charged with specific offences. The strike led to a sense of insecurity and threat that led to Indira Gandhi's imposition of the Emergency era in 1975. Previous strikes were aimed at companies or industries, but this strike was aimed at the government and from its ramifications proved to be the most successful of disastrous industrial actions in Indian history.

=== Emergency era and union ministry ===
George Fernandes arrested in the Baroda dynamite case

The reigning Prime Minister of India, Indira Gandhi, induced the president to declare a state of emergency on 25 June 1975 due to internal political disturbances. Accordingly, all fundamental rights enjoyed in the Indian Constitution were suspended. Political dissidents, newspaper reporters, opposition leaders who opposed the emergency were jailed. Fernandes, along with like-minded leaders, opposed what he saw as a blatant misuse of power. A day before the emergency Fernandes had arrived in Berhampur City in Odisha (on 24 June 1975) and was staying at his father-in-law Humayun Kabir's house on Gopalpur-On-Sea beach near Berhampur City, Odisha. Kabir was the education minister in former prime minister Pandit Jawaharlal Nehru's cabinet.

Fernandes's 25 June schedule in Berhampur city was packed. He attended a meeting of the Berhampur University Employees Association, a meeting with socialist leaders and workers and a gathering of intellectuals in the evening. He was scheduled to attend a meeting of the Railways Workers Association of Odisha on 26 June in Berhampur City, but before that he hid himself there secretly. A warrant was issued in Fernandes' name and subsequently he went underground to escape arrest and prosecution. When the police failed to capture him, they arrested and tortured his brother, Lawrence Fernandes, to reveal his brother's whereabouts. Snehalata Reddy, a chronic asthmatic, was arrested for being in touch with Fernandes and, as she was not given adequate care in the prison, died soon after her release.

In July 1975, Fernandes arrived in Baroda. There, he met Kirit Bhatt, who was president of Baroda Union of Journalists, and Vikram Rao, a staff correspondent of The Times of India at Baroda, both who opposed the Emergency. They used to meet and discuss on what could be done to topple the autocratic Indira Gandhi Government. An industrialist friend, Viren J. Shah, managing director of Mukand Ltd., helped them find contacts for procuring dynamite, used extensively in quarries around Halol (near Baroda). They aimed at blowing up toilets in government offices and cause explosions near the venue of public meetings to be addressed by Indira Gandhi. The idea was not to injure anybody, but only create a scare. The explosions were to be carried out either late in the night or hours before the public meeting was to begin to avoid injury. A plan was hatched to blow up a dais four hours before Indira Gandhi was to address a meeting in Varanasi. The conspiracy later came to be known as the infamous Baroda dynamite case.

According to Bhatt, there were two more plans that never worked out. Fernandes also wanted to rob a train used to carry weapons from Pimpri (near Poona) to Bombay. The weapons were to be used to blast government offices. Yet another plan was to take the help of other countries by using ham radio.

On 10 June 1976, he was finally arrested in Calcutta on charges of smuggling dynamite to blow up government establishments in protest against the imposition of emergency, in what came to be known as the Baroda dynamite case. After his arrest, Amnesty International members cabled the Government requesting that he be given immediate access to a lawyer and that his physical protection be guaranteed. Three world leaders from Germany, Norway and Austria were believed to have cabled Indira Gandhi and cautioned her against harming Fernandes. From Baroda, the accused were shifted to Tihar Jail. The accused were never chargesheeted.

==== Union Minister and Muzaffarpur MP post-1977 ====
After the emergency was lifted, elections were held in India from 16 to 20 March 1977. The Congress Party, led by Indira Gandhi, suffered a defeat at the hands of the Janata Party, a coalition created in 1977 out of several small parties that opposed Gandhi's Emergency era. The Janata Party and its allies came to power, headed by Morarji Desai, who became the first non-Congress Prime Minister of India. Fernandes won the Muzaffarpur seat in Bihar by an over 300,000 vote margin in 1977 from jail where he was lodged in the Baroda dynamite case, despite his not even visiting the constituency.

On 2 March 1977, he was appointed Minister of Post and Telegraph. In his speech, on 31 March 1977, in Lok Sabha, he emphasised on expanding postal services to rural areas. On 7 July 1977, he was appointed the Union Minister for Industries. During his union ministership, he clashed with American multinationals IBM and Coca-Cola insisting they implement FERA, the Foreign Exchange Regulation Act, which had been passed under Indira Gandhi's government. Under the FERA, foreign investors could not own more than 40 per cent of the share capital in Indian enterprises. The two multinationals decided to shut down their Indian operations, when Fernandes pressed ahead with rigid enforcement of FERA. On 1 May 1978, he launched District Industrial Centre to provide employment in rural areas.

During his first tenure as MP, Fernandes set up a Doordarshan Kendra (1978), Kanti Thermal Power Station (1978) and the Lijjat papad factory to generate employment in Muzaffarpur. Fernandes also insisted on women's empowerment. In November 2014, Kanti Thermal Power Station was renamed as George Fernandes Thermal Power Station (GFTPS).

In November 1978, he sent his resignation letter to Desai to work for the organization of Janata Party, which was rejected. On 12 July 1979, speaking on Motion of no confidence brought by Yashwantrao Chavan, George Fernandes defended Morarji Desai's government. But on 15 July 1979, George along with other ministers like Biju Patnaik, Purushottam Kaushik, Bhanu Pratap Singh resigned from Desai's cabinet.

=== Party memberships and railway ministry ===
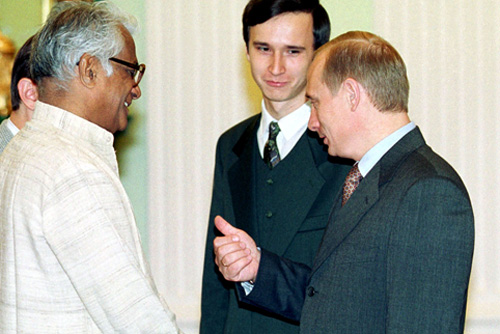
Fernandes (left) with Russian president Vladimir Putin in 2000

During his tenure as a minister in the Janata Party, he continued to be uncomfortable with certain elements of the broad-based Janata coalition, especially with the leaders of the erstwhile Hindu nationalist Bharatiya Jan Sangh in the Union Cabinet. In a debate preceding a vote of confidence two years into the government's tenure in 1979, he vehemently spoke out against the practice of permitting members to retain connections to the Rashtriya Swayamsevak Sangh (RSS) while being in the ministry in the Janata Party. The leaders of the Bharatiya Jan Sangh, among them Atal Bihari Vajpayee and Lal Krishna Advani, refused to give up their allegiance with the RSS, leading to a split within the Janata Party. The issue of "dual membership" caused Morarji Desai to lose the vote of confidence, and his government was reduced to a minority in the Lok Sabha. After the Janata Party started disintegrating in 1979, Charan Singh left it to form the Janata (Secular) Party and with support from the Congress Party, replaced Desai as prime minister.

In the seventh general elections held in 1980, the Janata (Secular) ministry failed to maintain a majority in the Lok Sabha, and Congress once again became the ruling party. Fernandes retained his Parliamentary seat from Muzaffarpur in 1980, and sat in the opposition. He contested for the Lok Sabha in 1984 from Bangalore North constituency against future Railway minister and Congress candidate C. K. Jaffer Sheriff, but lost the election by a margin of 40,000 votes. He then decided to shift his base to Bihar in 1989, when an anti-Congress wave was sweeping the country in the wake of the Bofors scandal, and won Muzaffarpur in the 1989 and 1991 general elections, He later joined the Janata Dal, a party which was formed from the Janata Party at Bangalore in August 1988. His second tenure as Minister of Railways in the V. P. Singh's government from 1989 to 1990, though short-lived, was quite eventful. He was one of the driving forces behind the Konkan Railway project, the first major development in the Rail transport in India#History since independence.

Fernandes broke away from the erstwhile Janata Dal and formed the Samata Party in 1994, which became a key ally of the Bharatiya Janata Party (BJP). BJP formed a short-lived government in the 1996 general elections along with the Samata Party and other allies. The government survived only for 13 days, since the BJP could not gather enough support from other parties to form a majority. Fernandes later served in the opposition along with BJP during the two United Front governments (1996–1998) led by Janata Dal ministers H. D. Deve Gowda and Inder Kumar Gujral. After the collapse of the United Front ministry led by Gujral, BJP and its allies won a slender majority in the 1998 general elections. The government lasted only for 13 months, due to the non-co-operation of All India Anna Dravida Munnetra Kazhagam (AIADMK) leader Jayalalithaa.

After the collapse of the second BJP-led coalition government, BJP and its allies formed a 24 party alliance called National Democratic Alliance (NDA), which became the first non-Congress coalition government in post-independence India to survive a full five-year term (1999–2004). Later, Fernandes became the convenor of NDA. On 27 July 1999, the Janata Dal again split into two factions, the Janata Dal (United) and the Janata Dal (Secular). In 2003, Fernandes reunited with the Janata Dal (United), and also merged his Samata Party with it.

=== Defence minister ===
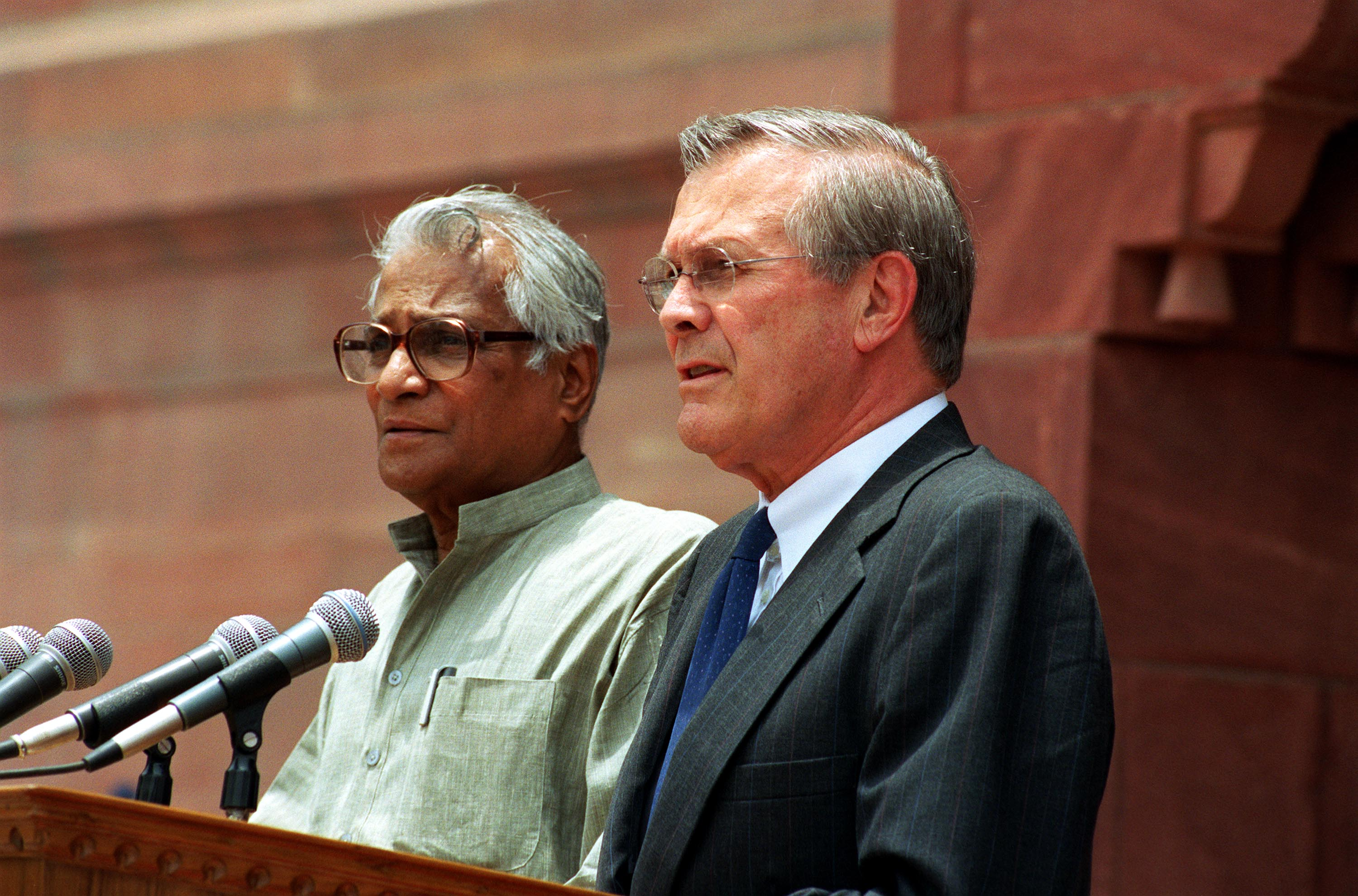
Fernandes (left) with US Secretary of Defense Donald Rumsfeld in 2002

Fernandes served as the Defence Minister of India in both the first and second National Democratic Alliance governments (1998–2004). During his tenure as the defence minister, the Kargil war over Kashmir broke out between India and Pakistan in 1999. The war began when heavily armed Pakistan-backed intruders dug themselves in at heights of 16,000 feet (4,900 m) – 18,000 feet (5,500 m) on the Indian side of the Line of Control (LOC) along an 80 kilometres (50 mi) stretch north of Kargil. They began attacking the strategic highway linking Srinagar and Leh. As a result, the Indian army undertook the Operation Vijay to push back the Pakistani intruders and regain the occupied territories. The inability of the Indian intelligence and military agencies to detect the infiltration early received criticism, both by the opposition as well as the media. However, Fernandes refused to acknowledge the failure of intelligence agencies in detecting infiltration along Kargil sector.

In May 1998, India conducted five nuclear tests at the Pokharan range in Rajasthan. Earlier a staunch supporter of nuclear disarmament, Fernandes openly endorsed the NDA government's decision to test the nuclear bombs. He was also involved in skirmishes with the then Chief of Naval Staff of the Indian Navy, Vishnu Bhagwat, over promotion of Vice-Admiral Harinder Singh as Deputy Chief of the Naval Staff. Bhagwat was subsequently sacked over the issue. After the Tehelka defence scandal broke out in March 2001, Fernandes quit as defence minister, but was reappointed to the post later. Fernandes is the only defence minister of a nuclear power who had a picture of Hiroshima bombing in his office. He made 18 visits to the icy heights of the 6,600 metres (4.1 mi) Siachen glacier in Kashmir, which holds the record of being "the world's highest battlefield". He was known for overseeing a huge increase in India's defence budget as compared to the allocations made by previous governments.

=== After the defence ministership ===
The NDA Government lost power to the Congress-led United Progressive Alliance (UPA) in the 2004 general elections.

Later, political observers alleged that Fernandes was locked in a bitter party rivalry with his one-time friend, Samata Party co-founder, Nitish Kumar. In the 2009 general elections, he contested from Muzaffarpur as an independent candidate after being denied a ticket by the Janata Dal (United) on health grounds, but he lost the election. On 30 July 2009, Fernandes filed his nomination as an independent candidate for the mid-term poll being held for the Rajya Sabha seat vacated by Janata Dal (United) president Sharad Yadav. The Janata Dal (United) did not field any candidate against him, which led to his being elected unopposed. He was sworn in on 4 August 2009.

== Reception ==
=== Support to secessionist groups in Sri Lanka ===
Fernandes supported and endorsed many secessionist movements and groups. He was a long time supporter of the Liberation Tigers of Tamil Eelam (LTTE), an organisation which sought to create an independent state in the north and east of Sri Lanka. Before 1997, he organised a controversial public convention of pro-LTTE delegates in New Delhi. In July 1998, he reportedly prevented the Indian Navy from intercepting ships that were suspected of carrying illegal weapons to Tamil guerrilla groups. Fernandes was also a patron of the Fund Raising Committee backed by the LTTE, with an objective to help the 26 accused in the Rajiv Gandhi assassination case. The Sri Lankan government stated that, "the LTTE's biggest supporter in India is Defence Minister George Fernandes."

=== Support for Tibetan and Burmese Groups ===
He also expressed support for Tibetan refugees fighting for freedom against China, and Burmese pro-democratic rebel groups fighting against the military government in Myanmar. He revealed the infamous "Operation Leech" incident, which resulted in the capture of Arakan Army insurgents in the Andaman and Nicobar Islands. He also fought for the welfare and release of anti-Burmese rebels held by the Indian Government.

=== CIA funding ===
During the Emergency, as chairman of the Socialist Party of India, he faced prosecution for alleged conspiracy against the government of Prime Minister Indira Gandhi. He allegedly sought to obtain funding from the US Central Intelligence Agency and the French government to organise underground sabotage activities. US diplomatic cables said that after an initial request to seek funding from the French government was turned down, he was "prepared to accept money from the CIA".

=== Tehelka scandal ===
Fernandes' name figured prominently in Operation West End, a sting operation in which journalist Mathew Samuel, armed with hidden cameras, from a controversial investigative journal, Tehelka, posing as representatives of a fictitious arms company, appeared to bribe the Bharatiya Janata Party President, Bangaru Laxman, a senior officer in the Indian Army and Jaya Jaitly, the General Secretary of the Samata Party and Fernandes' companion.

The scandal caused uproar all over India and Fernandes was forced to resign from his post as Defence Minister. He was subsequently cleared by the one man commission headed by retired Justice Phukan. The Phukan Committee Report was rejected by the United Progressive Alliance (UPA) Government headed by the Congress Party and a new committee headed by Justice K Venkataswami was appointed. The Committee investigated the case in detail, but Justice Venkataswami resigned before submitting the report in the case.

=== Barak Missile scandal ===
On 10 October 2006, the Central Bureau of Investigation (CBI) registered a First information report (FIR) against Fernandes, his associate Jaya Jaitly, and former navy chief Admiral Sushil Kumar for alleged irregularities in purchasing the ₹7 billion (US$73 million) Barak 1 system from Israel in 2000. Fernandes, however, said that the scientific adviser to the Defence Minister in National Democratic Alliance (NDA) Government (1998–2004), who later became the president of India, A. P. J. Abdul Kalam, had cleared the missile deal.

=== As defence minister ===
Following the Pokhran nuclear tests in 1998, he openly branded China as "India's enemy number one". He later expressed regret for his statements, saying it was wrongly interpreted by the media. He has also criticised China for providing sophisticated weapons to Pakistan to build its missiles, and has rapped the Chinese for strengthening their military across the Himalayas in Tibet.

Fernandes has claimed that he was strip searched twice at Dulles Airport in the US Capital area, when he was defence minister—once on an official visit to Washington in early 2002 and another time while en route to Brazil in mid-2003. The details of the strip-search were mentioned in American foreign policy analyst Strobe Talbott's book Engaging India – Diplomacy, Democracy and the Bomb. However, the US embassy in Delhi issued a formal denial that Fernandes had been strip-searched, and said that, "Fernandes was not strip-searched but a security wand was waved over him when a key in his pocket set off the metal detector." Subsequently, the then United States Deputy Secretary of State, Richard Armitage, personally apologised to Fernandes over the matter. This was one in a series of incidents involving the detention and search of Indian VIPs at US airports that marred Indian–US relations post 9/11.

He was accused in the 2002 coffin scam, following allegations that 500 poor quality aluminium caskets were bought from the United States at rates 13 times more than the actual price, to transport the bodies of slain soldiers, after the Kargil War. However, the CBI gave a clean sheet to Fernandes in the scam in its 2009 charge sheet.

== Positions held ==
Positions held
Position	Duration
Member, Standing Committee on Rural Development	5 Aug. 2007
Member, Committee on External Affairs	
Member, 14th Lok Sabha	Re-elected in 2004 (9th term)
Union Cabinet Minister, Defence	15 Oct. 2001 – May 2004
Member, General Purposes Committee	
Union Cabinet Minister, Defence	13 Oct. 1999 – 16 March 2001
Leader, Janata Dal (U), Parliamentary Party, Lok Sabha	
Member, 13th Lok Sabha	Re-elected in 1999 (8th term)
Member, General Purposes Committee	
Union Cabinet Minister, Defence	1998–1999
Member, 12th Lok Sabha	Re-elected in 1998 (7th term)
Member, Consultative Committee, Ministry of Human Resource Development	
Member, Committee on External Affairs	1996–1997
Member, 11th Lok Sabha	Re-elected in 1996 (6th term)
President, Samata Party	1994 onwards
Member, Consultative Committee, Ministry of Home Affairs	
Member, Committee on Finance	1993–1996
Member, 10th Lok Sabha	Re-elected in 1991 (5th term)
Member, Railway Convention Committee	1990–1991
Minister of Kashmir Affairs (Additional charge)	March–May 1990
Union Cabinet Minister, Railways	1989–1990
Member, 9th Lok Sabha	Re-elected in 1989 (4th term)
Member, 7th Lok Sabha	Re-elected in 1980 (3rd term)
Union Cabinet Minister, Industry	1977–1979
Union Cabinet Minister, Communications	March–July 1977
Member, 6th Lok Sabha	Re-elected in 1977 (2nd term)
President, All India Railwaymen's Federation	
Chairman, Socialist Party	1973–1977
General Secretary, Samyukta Socialist Party	1969–1973
Member, Committee on Petitions	1967–1970
Member, 4th Lok Sabha	Elected in 1967

== Writings, journalism and other contributions ==
Fernandes liked writing and journalism in his student days. He was the editor of a Konkani language monthly Konkani Yuvak (Konkani Youth) in 1949. The same year, he was the editor of the Raithavani weekly in Kannada. The Dockman weekly in English, which had ceased publication, reappeared under the editorship of Fernandes in 1952–53. Though not a prolific writer, Fernandes wrote several books on politics including What Ails the Socialists (1972), Socialist Communist Interaction in India, In the year of the disabled: India's disabled government (1981), Dignity for All: Essays in Socialism and Democracy (1991), and his autobiography titled George Fernandes Speaks (1991). He was the editor of an English monthly, The Other Side, and the chairman of the editorial board of the Hindi monthly Pratipaksh. A human rights activist, Fernandes had been a member of Amnesty International, the People's Union for Civil Liberties and the Press Council of India. In the year 2022, a Canada-based Mangalorean origin writer Chris Emmanuel Dsouza published a book titled Bandh Samrat – Tales of eternal rebel that chronicled George Fernandes's early days of Trade union activism in his hometown of Mangalore, his early slog in his adopted city of Bombay and his association with stellar socialist figures of Mangalore like the noted Ammembala Balappa and Placid D’Mello.

== Family and personal life ==
Fernandes met Leila Kabir, the daughter of former Union minister Humayun Kabir, on a flight back to Delhi from Calcutta. Fernandes, then the general secretary of the Samyukta Socialist Party, was returning from Bangladesh while Kabir was on her way back from the battlefront where she had gone as an assistant director of the Red Cross. They began dating and were married on 22 July 1971. They had a son, Sean Fernandes, who is an investment banker based in New York. Fernandes and Kabir separated in the mid-1980s. Jaya Jaitly was Fernandes' companion from 1984.

Fernandes spoke ten languages—Konkani, English, Hindi, Tulu, Kannada, Marathi, Tamil, Urdu, Malayalam, and Latin. Konkani was his mother tongue. He learnt Marathi and Urdu in jail, and Latin while he was in the seminary in his early youth. He was fluent in Hindi and English.

Fernandes was reported to be suffering from Alzheimer's and Parkinson's diseases, and in January 2010 was undergoing treatment at Baba Ramdev's ashram at Haridwar for the diseases at the request of Leila Kabir, who had recently returned to his life. In February 2010, Fernandes' brothers were reported to have been considering a court order for medical treatment and visitation; Kabir and Sean Fernandes are alleged to have forcibly removed Fernandes to an undisclosed location. In July 2010, the Delhi High Court ruled that Fernandes would stay with Kabir and that Fernandes' brothers would be able to visit.

In August 2012 the Supreme Court of India granted permission to Jaya Jaitly, a former aide, to visit him, a move which was opposed by his wife on the grounds of her locus standi.

He died at the age of 88 on 29 January 2019, in Delhi following a swine flu infection.

== See also ==
- National Democratic Alliance (India)
- Freethought

Lok Sabha
Preceded by Sadashiv Kanoji Patil	Member of Parliament for Mumbai South; 1967–1971	Succeeded by Kailas Narain Narula Shivnarain
Preceded by Nawal Kishore Sinha	Member of Parliament for Muzaffarpur; 1977–1984	Succeeded by Laliteshwar Prasad Shahi
Preceded by Laliteshwar Prasad Shahi	Member of Parliament for Muzaffarpur; 1989–1996	Succeeded by Jai Narain Prasad Nishad
Preceded by Vijay Kumar Yadav	Member of Parliament for Nalanda; 1996–2004	Succeeded by Nitish Kumar
Preceded by Jai Narain Prasad Nishad	Member of Parliament for Muzaffarpur; 2004–2009	Succeeded by Jai Narain Prasad Nishad
Political offices
Preceded by Madhav Rao Scindia	Minister of Railways; 1989–1990	Succeeded by Janeshwar Mishra
Preceded by Mulayam Singh Yadav	Minister of Defence; 1998–2001	Succeeded by Jaswant Singh
Preceded by Jaswant Singh	Minister of Defence; 2001–2004	Succeeded by Pranab Mukherjee
