= Jaya Jaitly =

Indian politician (born 1942)

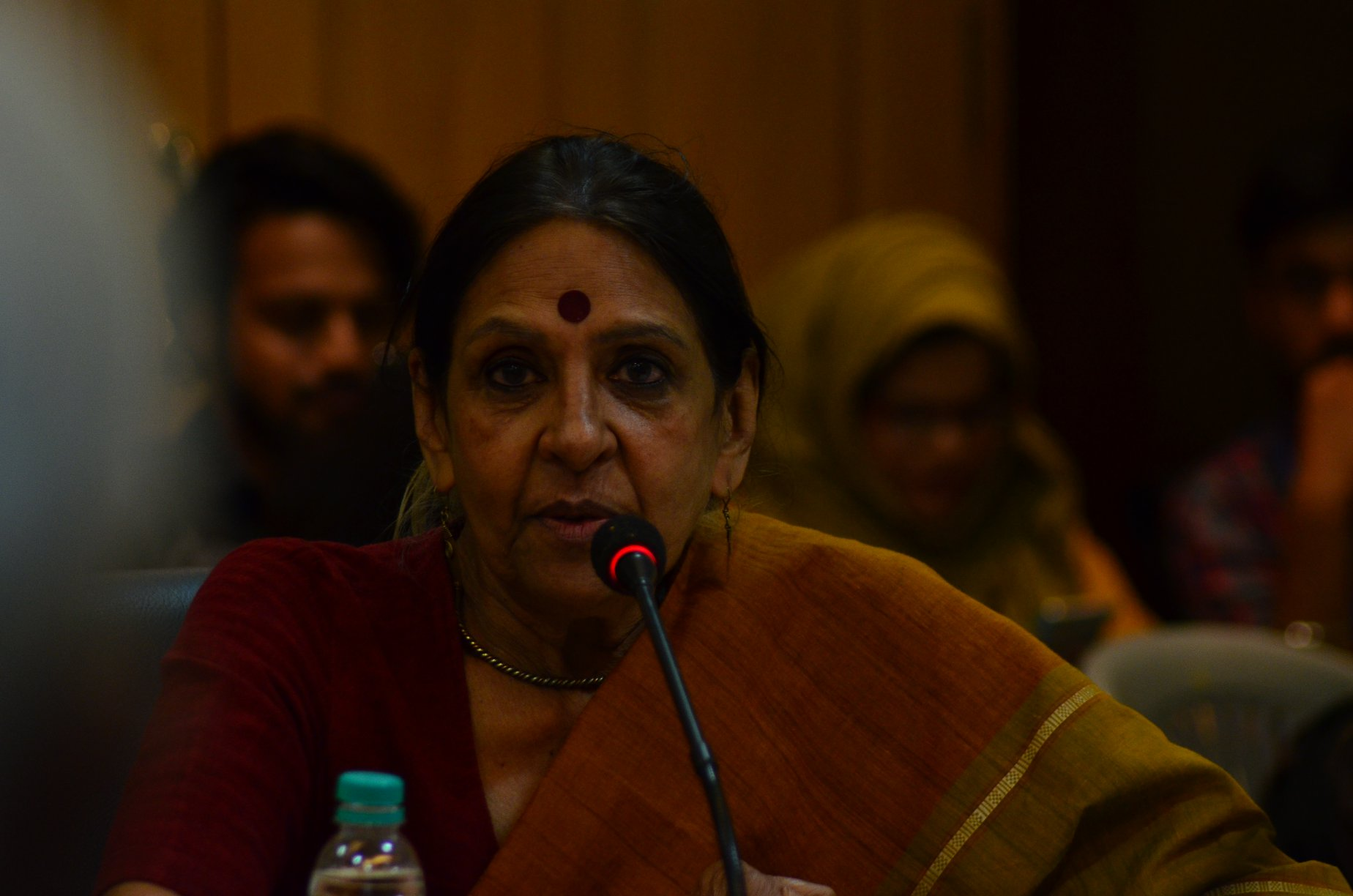
- Education: Smith College
- Occupations: Politician, Activist, Author, Indian handicrafts Curator and former President of Samata Party.

Jaya Jaitly (born 14 June 1942) is an Indian politician, activist, author, Indian handicrafts curator and former President of Samata Party.

She stepped down as party president because of the Operation West End controversy in 2002. In 2020 she was sentenced to 4 years in prison for her role in the Operation West End bribery case.

== Biography ==
Jaya Jaitly was born on 14 June 1942 in Simla, British India. Her father K. K. Chettur, from Kerala, and was independent India's first ambassador to Japan. Jaitly travelled with him to Japan and Burma. Her father died when she was thirteen.

Jaitly and her mother moved to Delhi where she attended the Convent of Jesus and Mary school. Jaitly was awarded a scholarship to study at the Smith College in the United States.

== Political career ==
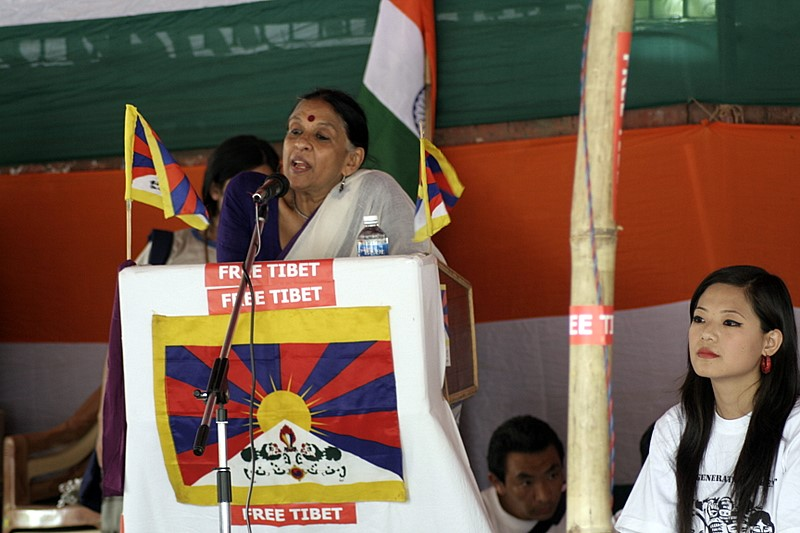
Jaya Jaitly addressing students in May 2008

Jaitly met the politician George Fernandes when her husband started working for him. On Fernandes' request, she joined the Socialist Trade Union. After the 1984 anti-Sikh riots, she became active in politics; referring to Fernandes and Madhu Limaye as mentors. In the same year, she joined the Janata Party. It split to form the Janta Dal and later, she and Fernandes formed the Samata Party.

=== Handicrafts curator ===
Jaya Jaitly supported the development of Indian arts and crafts cottage industries. In 1986, she founded the Dastkari Haat Samiti (Arts and Crafts Market) to enable rural artisans of traditional Indian crafts to gain confidence in the marketplace through innovative strategies. Her work brought artisans of India, Pakistan and Vietnam and was taken up by the Indian government as an instrument of diplomacy to bring together crafts practitioners from all over the globe to share their skills and assist in capacity building.

She has authored and published books including Crafts of Jammu, Kashmir and Ladakh, the Craft Traditions of India, Viswakarma's Children, a socio-economic study of crafts people, and Crafting Nature. A selection of her articles on politics, social issues, women, human rights, foreign affairs, etc. was compiled into a book titled Podium on the Pavement. She has assisted NCERT in creating a syllabus for the craft heritage of India's schools. She edits and publishes a monthly political journal of democratic socialist thought and action called The Other Side. She has been deeply involved in heritage issues at all levels and has received awards from PHD Chamber and FICCI for her work in culture and arts and as a role model for women leaders.

=== Operation West End ===
After Tehelka's scandal Operation West End broke out, where she was accused of accepting a bribe of two lakh rupees. Fernandes' name figured prominently in Operation West End, a sting operation in which journalist Mathew Samuel, armed with hidden cameras, from a controversial investigative journal, Tehelka, posing as representatives of a fictitious arms company, appeared to bribe the Bharatiya Janata Party President, Bangaru Laxman, a senior officer in the Indian Army and Jaya Jaitly, the General Secretary of the Samata Party and Fernandes' companion. She stepped down as president of the Samata Party in 2002.

In 2020, she was sentenced to 4 years in prison for her role in the Defence Contract bribery case. She was convicted under Section 120B (criminal conspiracy) of the IPC and Section 9 (taking gratification for exercise of personal influence with public servant) of the Prevention of Corruption Act, 1988.

== Personal life ==
She met Ashok Jaitly while in college. They married in 1965 and have two children - Akshay and Aditi (who later married cricketer Ajay Jadeja). She and Ashok Jaitly divorced, with Jaya Jaitly holding her active role in politics as the main reason for the split. For more than 25 years, George Fernandes remained her partner.

In 2012, she was allowed to visit Fernandes, who had Alzheimer's, after her having to petition the High court against Fernandes' relatives who opposed her.

== See also ==
- Samata Party
