= Sarvagnanagar Assembly constituency =

Constituency of the Karnataka legislative assembly in India

Coordinates: 12.988°N 77.637°E

Sarvagnanagar
- Constituency No. 160 for the Karnataka Legislative Assembly

Constituency details
- Country: India
- Region: South India
- State: Karnataka
- District: Bengaluru Urban
- Lok Sabha constituency: Bangalore Central
- Established: 2008
- Total electors: 366,876 (2023)
- Reservation: None

Member of Legislative Assembly
- 16th Karnataka Legislative Assembly
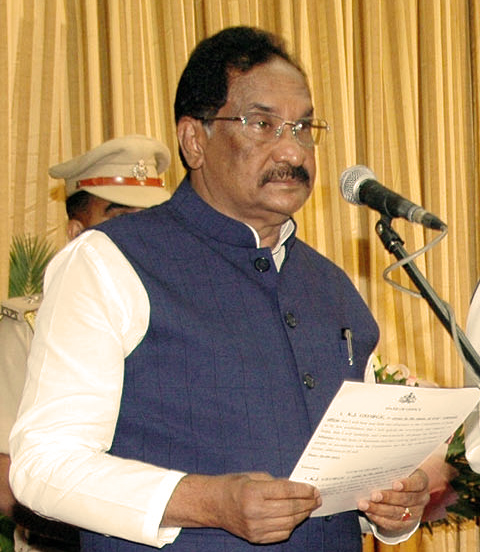
- Incumbent K. J. George
- Party: Indian National Congress
- Elected year: 2023

Sarvagnanagar Assembly constituency is one of the 224 constituencies in the Karnataka Legislative Assembly of Karnataka, a southern state of India. It is also part of Bangalore Central Lok Sabha constituency. The constituency has 32% Muslims, 14.01% Dalits and 9% Christians.

== Members of the Legislative Assembly ==
Election	Member	Party
2008	Kelachandra Joseph George	Indian National Congress
2013	Kelachandra Joseph George	Indian National Congress
2018	Kelachandra Joseph George	Indian National Congress
2023	Kelachandra Joseph George	Indian National Congress

== Election results ==
=== Assembly Election 2023 ===
2023 Karnataka Legislative Assembly election : Sarvagnanagar
Party	Candidate	Votes	%	±%
INC	Kelachandra Joseph George	118,783	61.04%	▼0.70
BJP	Padmanabha Reddy	63,015	32.38%	▲0.57
JD(S)	Mohammed Mustafa	3,839	1.97%	▼0.80
SDPI	Abdul Hannan	2,995	1.54%	New
NOTA	None of the above	2,116	1.09%	▼0.26
AAP	Mohamed Ibrahim	1,488	0.76%	▼0.28
Margin of victory		55,768	28.66%	▼1.27
Turnout		194,605	53.04%	▲1.80
Total valid votes		194,604		
Registered electors		366,876		▲5.56
INC hold		Swing	▼0.70	

=== Assembly Election 2018 ===
2018 Karnataka Legislative Assembly election : Sarvagnanagar
Party	Candidate	Votes	%	±%
INC	Kelachandra Joseph George	109,955	61.74%	▼3.88
BJP	M. N. Reddy	56,651	31.81%	▼12.29
JD(S)	Anwar Sharieff	4,926	2.77%	▼4.49
NOTA	None of the above	2,405	1.35%	New
AAP	Prithvi Reddy	1,861	1.04%	New
Margin of victory		53,304	29.93%	▲8.41
Turnout		178,091	51.24%	▲1.00
Total valid votes		178,091		
Registered electors		347,559		▲24.10
INC hold		Swing	▼3.88	

=== Assembly Election 2013 ===
2013 Karnataka Legislative Assembly election : Sarvagnanagar
Party	Candidate	Votes	%	±%
INC	Kelachandra Joseph George	69,673	65.62%	▲23.48
BJP	Padmanabha Reddy	46,820	44.10%	▲22.90
SDPI	Mahboob Shariff	11,161	10.51%	New
JD(S)	Syed Mohid Altaf	7,711	7.26%	▼8.98
KJP	Michael. B. Fernandes	2,223	2.09%	New
Margin of victory		22,853	21.52%	▲0.58
Turnout		140,703	50.24%	▲14.83
Total valid votes		106,178		
Registered electors		280,059		▼8.14
INC hold		Swing	▲23.48	

=== Assembly Election 2008 ===
2008 Karnataka Legislative Assembly election : Sarvagnanagar
Party	Candidate	Votes	%	±%
INC	Kelachandra Joseph George	45,488	42.14%	New
BJP	R. Shankar	22,880	21.20%	New
JD(S)	Padmanabha Reddy	17,532	16.24%	New
BSP	Ismail Sharieff	15,797	14.63%	New
ANC	Syed Umraj Pasha	1,768	1.64%	New
Independent	Vivek Menon	1,291	1.20%	New
Independent	A. Sathya	836	0.77%	New
CPI	G. Gilbert Selvin	816	0.76%	New
Margin of victory		22,608	20.94%	
Turnout		107,946	35.41%	
Total valid votes		107,941		
Registered electors		304,880		
INC win (new seat)				

== See also ==
- Sarvagnanagar
- Bangalore Urban district
- List of constituencies of Karnataka Legislative Assembly
