= Sudhir Choudhrie =

Indian-born London-based businessman

- Born: September 1949 (age 76–77); India
- Citizenship: Indian / British
- Education: University of Delhi
- Spouse: Anita
- Children: Bhanu and Dhairya

Sudhir Choudhrie (born September 1949) is an Indian-born and London-based businessman with interests in healthcare, aviation, and hospitality.

== Early life ==
Sudhir Choudhrie was born in September 1949, and raised in Delhi by his mother, after his father’s early death. Choudhrie has described his mother as his "role model" in life.

He has a bachelor's degree in Economics from the University of Delhi.

His uncle B. K. Kapur was the chairman of Hindustan Aeronautics Limited, the Indian state-owned aerospace and defence company, from at least as early as 1982, until 2013.

== Career ==
After completing his education, Choudhrie chose not to join his grandfather's Delhi real estate business, and began his own business career buying TV equipment from the UK to sell on to the Indian government to develop the country's growing television network in the 1960s and 70s. His business developed as an exporter of consumer goods including farm machinery, initially particularly focused on the Soviet Union, then India’s largest trading partner.

Choudhrie founded the Magnum International Trading Company Ltd in 1975, where he focused on export markets.

Choudhrie has served as vice chairman of Alpha C&C Group, a holding company for investments he founded over 30 years ago. He was a director of the chartered airline companies Deccan Aviation Ltd (2007–08) and Kingfisher Airlines (2008-). Choudhrie was a non-executive director of Ebookers, a travel website, from 1999 to 2005.

From 1993 to 2004, Choudhrie served as Latvia's Honorary Consul General to India.

In 2013, Theresa May awarded him the "Asian Business Lifetime Achievement Year Award 2013".

In July 2013 the Daily Telegraph alleged that Choudhrie had been denied a peerage because of concerns about the treatment of patients by the Alpha Hospital Group. The company responded by saying "Sudhir Choudhrie does not run or manage Alpha Healthcare or Alpha Hospitals. He retired from being a director of both companies in 2007". In July 2014 the Guardian published a correction to a similar story, accepting that there was no evidence to suggest that his peerage was blocked because concerns about Alpha.

Choudhrie is thought to have a long-term interest in the defence trade and has been described as "one of India’s key arms dealers". He was allegedly blacklisted by the Indian government due to being suspected of "corrupt or irregular practice", following several investigations into his companies. In February 2014, Choudhrie was detained by the Serious Fraud Office (SFO) in a bribery investigation into Rolls-Royce Holdings. He denied any wrongdoing, was never charged and was released on bail without conditions. The Sunday Times reported that the bail was completely lifted in July 2014. It also indicated that Choudhrie was unlikely to be a part of the inquiry any further.

=== Author ===
In 2017 Choudhrie published From My Heart: A Tale of Love, Life and Destiny, an autobiographical work focusing on his early life, long term heart condition and experience of a heart transplant operation.

== Philanthropy ==
Choudhrie has been a longstanding benefactor of Green Templeton College at the University of Oxford, where a Library has been named in his honour. Choudhrie holds an honorary Radcliffe fellowship at the college and has supported the annual GTC Emerging Markets Symposium since it began in 2007.

Choudhrie is a benefactor of the Columbia University Medical Center in New York City, where a professorship in Cardiology has been established in his name.

The Choudhrie family support several charities. Their UK based Path to Success charity works to promote educational opportunities and provide assistance for disabled people, and to help the homeless. Led by Choudhrie's wife Anita, the charity ran a campaign to fund sixty wheelchairs for sixty UK NHS hospitals in 2013. It supports the Amar Jyoti Trust in India providing educational, sporting and cultural activities for disabled and able bodied children.

== Personal life ==
Choudhrie is married to Anita and they have two sons, Bhanu and Dhairya. The family lives in London.

Choudhrie suffered from the same genetic heart condition that led to the early death of his brother Rajiv in 1998. Following years of ill health, in 1999 Choudhrie's heart also failed and he underwent an emergency heart transplant operation at Columbia University Medical Centre in New York. The surgeon was Dr Mehmet Oz who has talked about the operation on his The Dr Oz Show. Choudhrie is now one of the longest surviving heart transplant recipients in the world and has described surviving the operation as his "greatest achievement".

The wealth of the Choudhrie family is estimated at US$2 billion.

=== Arts ===
Choudhrie enjoys restoring vintage cars and has one of the finest private collections in India.

Choudhrie and his wife Anita collect Indian art, particularly M. F. Husain ("the Picasso of India"). They founded the Stellar International Art Foundation in 2008, which has collected over 600 pieces, including many by Husain. The Foundation held an exhibition of Husain's art in London in 2015. Choudhrie owns works by Damian Hirst, Andy Warhol and Anish Kapoor.

=== Politics ===
Choudhrie is a long term backer of the UK Liberal Democrats and has supported the party financially since 2004, making over £1.5million in donations (personal and company).

In 2015 Liberal Democrat leader Tim Farron appointed Choudhrie as his adviser on India, a role involving helping the party develop its relationship with the British-Indian community and providing advice on Britain's foreign and business relationships with India.
