= Harinagar =

Harinagar may refer to:

- Harinagar, Bihar
- Harinagar, Manipur
- Harinagar, Mayabunder, Andaman Islands
- Harinagar Poonkunnam, Kerala
- Harinagar, Uttar Pradesh
- Harinagara Rural Municipality, Nepal
