= Praja Socialist Party =

- Leader: Jayaprakash Narayan; Rambriksh Benipuri; Surendranath Dwivedy; Srinibas Mishra; Acharya Narendra Deva; Basawon Singh (Sinha); Shyam Sunder Das; Yugal Kishore Pathak; Hariprasad C.; J. B. Kripalani
- Founded: September 1952; 74 years ago
- Dissolved: 1972
- Merger of: Socialist Party and Kisan Mazdoor Praja Party
- Merged into: Samyukta Socialist Party (Fraction)
- Succeeded by: Socialist Party
- Headquarters: 18, Windsor Place, New Delhi
- Ideology: Socialism
- Political position: Left-wing
- International affiliation: Asian Socialist Conference
- ECI status: Dissolved

Election symbol
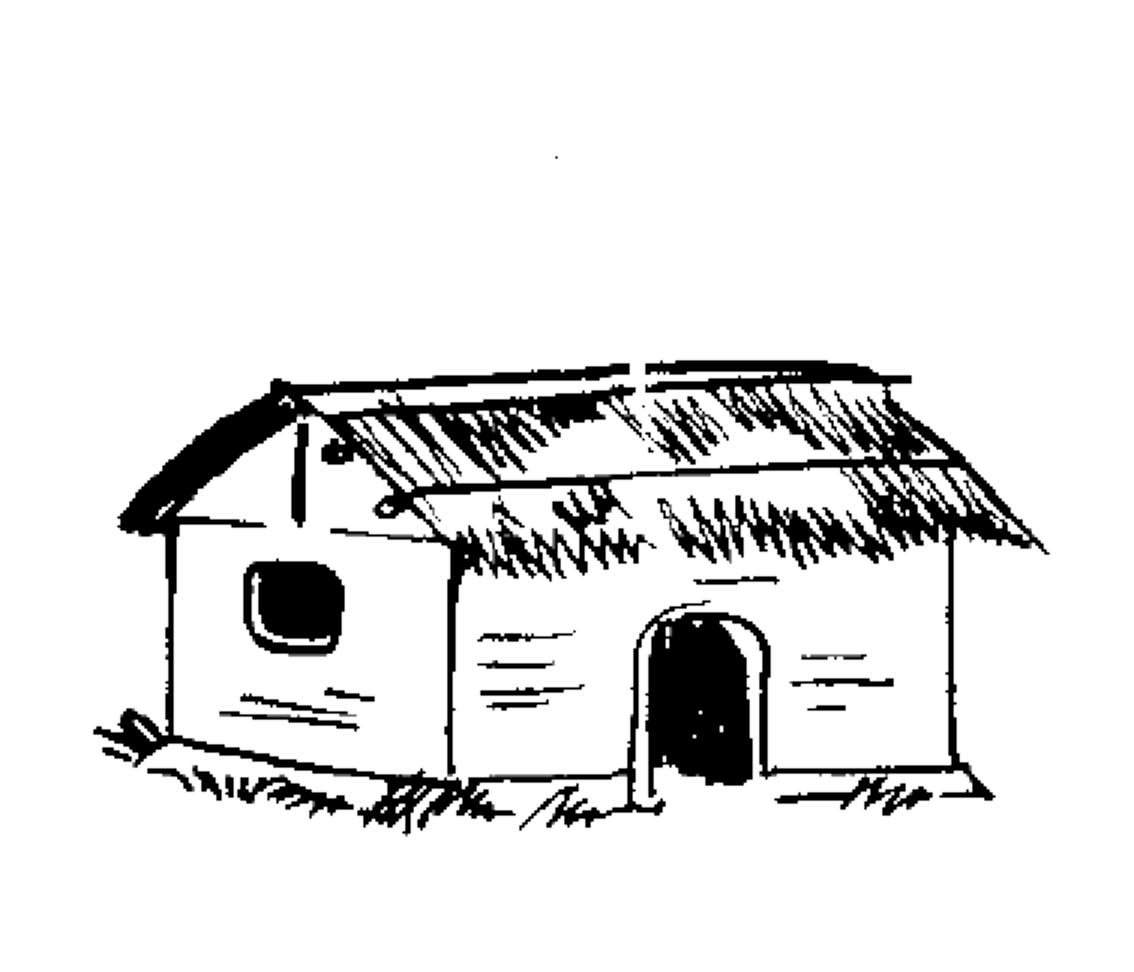

Party flag

The Praja Socialist Party, abbreviated as PSP, was an Indian political party that was active between 1952 and 1972. It was founded in 1952 when the Socialist Party, led by Jayaprakash Narayan, Rambriksh Benipuri, Narendra Deva and Basawon Singh, merged with the Kisan Mazdoor Praja Party led by J. B. Kripalani (former president of the Indian National Congress and a close associate of Jawaharlal Nehru).

== History ==
In September 1952, the Kisan Mazdoor Praja Party merged with the Socialist Party with J. B. Kriplani as the chairman and Asoka Mehta as the general secretary.

The PSP led the cabinet under Pattom A. Thanu Pillai as chief minister of the State of Travancore-Cochin from March 1954 to February 1955. In 1955 a faction led by Ram Manohar Lohia broke from the party, reusing the name "Socialist Party". The PSP again came to power in the new state of Kerala under Pattom A. Thanu Pillai from February 1960 to September 1962. In 1960, Kripalani left the party and in 1964, Asoka Mehta joined Congress after his expulsion from the party.

Another section of the party, led by the trade union leader George Fernandes, broke off to join the Samyukta Socialist Party in 1967. In 1972, a section merged with Fernandes's party to become the Socialist Party once more, before becoming part of the Janata coalition in 1977 following the proclamation of Emergency by Indira Gandhi.

== Elections ==
At the party's first general election in 1957, the PSP won 10.41% of the total votes and 19 seats in the Lok Sabha. However, the party's vote share continued to decline over the next few elections. It won 6.81% of the total votes and 12 seats in the Lok Sabha in 1962, 3.06% of the total votes and 13 seats in the Lok Sabha in 1967 and only 1.04% of the total votes and only 2 seats in the Lok Sabha in 1971.

== See also ==
- List of political parties in India
