= Ramdhari Singh Dinkar =

Indian poet (1908–1974)

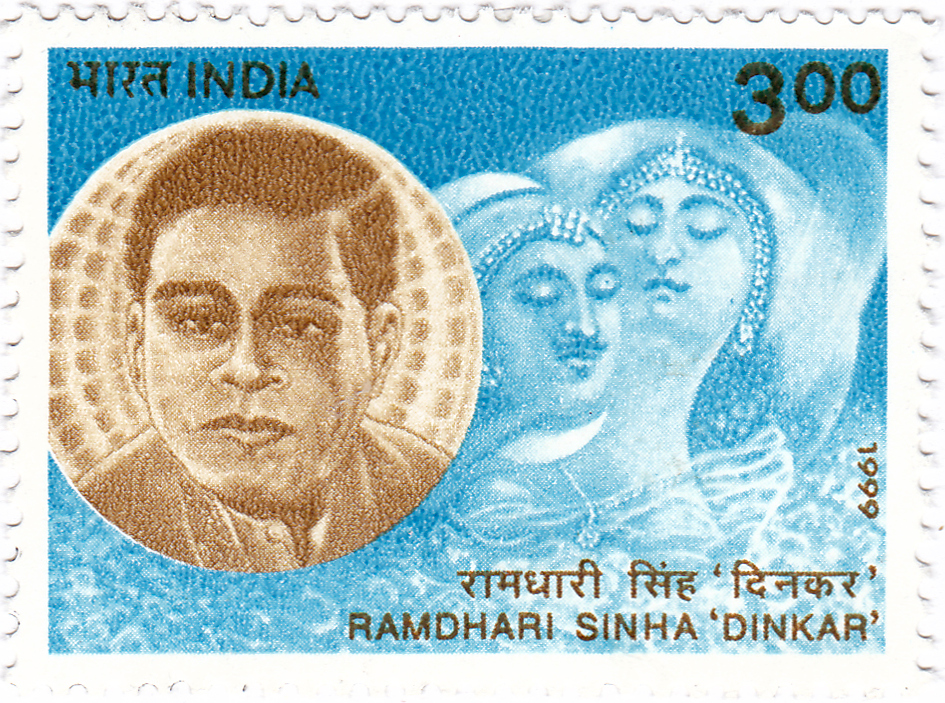
- Dinkar on a 1999 stamp of India
- Born: Ramdhari Singh; 23 September 1908; Simaria, Bengal Presidency, British India (present-day Begusarai, Bihar India)
- Died: 24 April 1974 (aged 65); Madras (present-day Chennai), Tamil Nadu, India
- Education: Patna College, University of Patna
- Occupations: Poet; freedom fighter; politician; essayist; literary critic; journalist; satirist
- Spouse: Shyamavati Devi
- Children: 4
- Writing career
- Pen name: Dinkar
- Language: Hindi
- Notable works: Parshuram Ki Pratiksha; Rashmirathi; Hunkar
- Notable awards: 1959: Sahitya Akademi Award; 1959: Padma Bhushan; 1972: Bharatiya Jnanpith
- Movement: Indian Independence movement

Member of Parliament, Rajya Sabha
- In office 3 April 1952 – 2 April 1964
- President: Sarvepalli Radhakrishnan (1962–1964); Rajendra Prasad (1952–1962)
- Chairman: Zakir Husain (1962–1964); Sarvepalli Radhakrishnan (1952–1962)
- Constituency: Bihar

Personal details
- Party: Indian National Congress

Signature
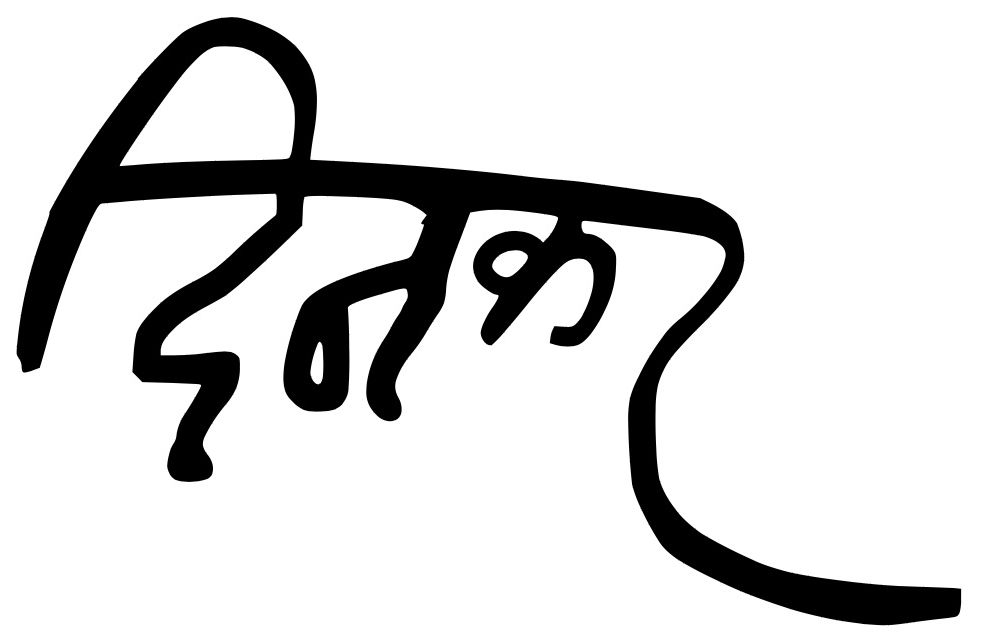

Ramdhari Singh (23 September 1908 – 24 April 1974), known by his pen name Dinkar, was an Indian Hindi language poet, essayist, freedom fighter, patriot and academic. He emerged as a poet of rebellion as a consequence of his nationalist poetry written in the days before Indian independence. His poetry exuded Veer Rasa (heroic sentiment), and he has been hailed as a Rashtrakavi ('national poet') and Yuga-Chāraṇa (Charan of the Era) on account of his inspiring patriotic compositions. He was a regular poet of Hindi Kavi Sammelan and is hailed to be as popular and connected to poetry lovers for Hindi speakers as Pushkin for Russians.

One of the notable modern Hindi poets, Dinkar was born in Simaria village of the Bengal Presidency, British India, now part of Begusarai district in Bihar state. The government honored him with the Padma Bhushan in 1959 and nominated him three times to the Rajya Sabha. Similarly, his political thought was greatly shaped by both Mahatma Gandhi and Karl Marx. Dinkar gained popularity in the pre-independence period through his nationalist poetry.

Dinkar initially supported the revolutionary movement during the Indian independence struggle, but later became a Gandhian. However, he used to call himself a "Bad Gandhian" because he supported the feelings of indignation and revenge among the youth. In Kurukshetra, he accepted that war is destructive but argued that it is necessary for the protection of freedom. He was close to prominent nationalists of the time such as Rajendra Prasad, Anugrah Narayan Sinha, Sri Krishna Sinha, Rambriksh Benipuri and Braj Kishore Prasad.

Dinkar was elected three times to the Rajya Sabha, and he was the member of this house from 3 April 1952 to 2 April 1964, and was awarded the Padma Bhushan in 1959. He was also the Vice-Chancellor of Bhagalpur University (Bhagalpur, Bihar) in the early 1960s.

During The Emergency, Jayaprakash Narayan had attracted a gathering of one lakh (100,000) people at the Ramlila grounds and recited Dinkar's famous poem: Singhasan Khaali Karo Ke Janata Aati Hai ('Vacate the throne, for the people are coming').

== Biography ==
Dinkar was born on 23 September 1908, in Simaria village, Bengal Presidency, British India, (now in Begusarai district in Bihar) in a Bhumihar family to Babu Ravi Singh and Manroop Devi. He was married in Tabhka village of Samastipur district in Bihar. As a student, his favourite subjects were history, politics and philosophy. At school and later in college, he studied Hindi, Sanskrit, Maithili, Bengali, Urdu and English literature. Dinkar was greatly influenced by Rabindranath Tagore, Keats and Milton and translated works of Rabindranath Tagore from Bengali to Hindi. The poetic persona of the poet Dinkar was shaped by the pressures and counter-pressures of life during the Indian freedom movement. A tall man at 5 ft 11 in (1.80 m), with a fair complexion, prominent nose, large ears and broad forehead, he had a distinctive appearance. He worked as a Hindi teacher at Langat Singh College, Muzaffarpur, Bihar from 1950-1952.

As a student, Dinkar had to battle day to day issues, some related to their family's economic circumstances. When he was a student of Mokama High School, it was not possible for him to stay on until school closed at four p.m. as he had to leave the class after the lunch break to catch the steamer back home. He could not afford to be in the hostel which would have enabled him to attend all periods. How could a student who had no shoes on his feet manage the hostel fees? His poetry later showed the impact of poverty. This was the environment in which Dinkar grew up and became a nationalist poet of radical views. In 1920, Dinkar saw Mahatma Gandhi for the first time. About this time, he founded Manoranjan Library at Simariya. He also edited a handwritten pamphlet.

=== Creative struggle ===
When Dinkar stepped into his adolescence, the Indian freedom movement had already begun under the leadership of Mahatma Gandhi. In 1929, when after matriculation, he entered Patna College to study intermediate; this movement started becoming aggressive. In 1928, the Simon Commission, against which nationwide demonstrations were being held, arrived. Demonstrations were held in Patna too led by Maghfoor Ahmad Ajazi and Dinkar too signed the oath-paper. Thousands came to the rally at Gandhi Maidan in which Dinkar also participated. During the protest against Simon Commission, the police of the British government mercilessly lathi charged the Lion of Punjab, Lala Lajpat Rai, who succumbed to the injuries. The whole country was in turmoil. The youthful mind of Dinkar became increasingly radical due to these agitations. His emotional nature was charged with poetic energy.

Dinkar's first poem was published in 1924 in a magazine called Chhatra Sahodar ('Brother of Students'), a monthly journal published from Jabalpur by noted littérateur Beohar Rajendra Simha together with Narsinghdas Agrawal. In 1928, the peasant's satyagraha under the leadership of Sardar Vallabhbhai Patel proved successful in Bardoli of Gujarat. He wrote ten poems based on this Satyagraha which was published in a book form under the title Vijay-Sandesh ('Message of Victory'). This composition is now available. Right in front of Patna College, the office of Yuvak functioned. To escape the wrath of the government, Dinkar's poems were published under the pseudonym "Amitabh". On 14 September 1928, a poem of his, on the martyrdom of Jatin Das, was published. Around this time he wrote two small works of poetry called Birbala and Meghnad-Vadh, but neither of them are traceable now. In 1930, he composed a poem called Pran-Bhang ('The Breach of Vow'), which was mentioned by Ramchandra Shukla in his history. So the journey of his poetic career should be deemed to have begun with Vijay-Sandesh. Before this his poems had become a frequent feature of the magazine Desh, published from Patna and of Pratibha, which was published from Kannauj.

Dinkar's first collection of poems, Renuka, was published in November 1935. Banarsi Das Chaturvedi, the editor of Vishal Bharat, wrote that Hindi-speaking people should celebrate the publication of Renuka. Around this time, Chaturvediji went to Sevagram. He took with him a copy of Renuka. The copy was given to Mahatma Gandhi.

The famous historian Dr. Kashi Prasad Jaiswal is said to have loved him like a son. During the early days of Dinkar's poetic career, Jaiswal helped him in every way. Jaiswal died on 4 August 1937, which was a great blow to the young poet. Much later, he wrote in Kalpna, a magazine published from Hyderabad, "It was a good thing that Jaiswalji was my first admirer. Now when I have savoured the love and encouragement of the Sun, Moon, Varun, Kuber, Indra, Brihaspati, Shachi and Brahmani, it is clear that none of them was like Jaiswalji. As I heard the news of his death, the world became a dark place for me. I did not know what to do." Jaiswalji was the first person to appreciate the historical sense in the poetry of Dinkar.

== Work ==
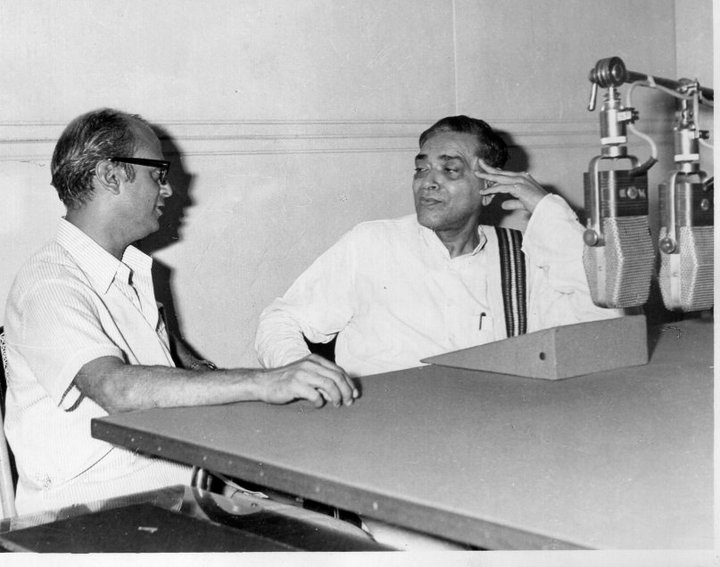
Dinkar in conversation with KC Sharma at All India Radio

His works are mostly of Veer Rasa, or the 'brave mode', although Urvashi is an exception to this. Some of his greatest works are Rashmirathi and Parashuram ki Prateeksha. He is hailed as the greatest Hindi poet of 'Veer Rasa' since Bhushan.

Acharya (teacher) Hazari Prasad Dwivedi wrote that Dinkar was very popular among people whose mother-tongue was not Hindi and he was a symbol of love for one's own mother-tongue. Harivansh Rai Bachchan wrote that for his proper respect, Dinkar should get four Bharatiya Jnanpith Awards – for poetry, prose, languages and for his service to Hindi. Rambriksh Benipuri wrote that Dinkar is giving voice to the revolutionary movement in the country. Namvar Singh wrote that he was really the sun of his age.

Hindi writer Rajendra Yadav, whose novel Sara Akash also carried a few lines of Dinkar's poetry, has said of him, "He was always very inspiring to read. His poetry was about reawakening. He often delved into Hindu mythology and referred to heroes of epics such as Karna." He was a poet of anti-imperialism and nationalism, says well-known Hindi writer Kashinath Singh.

He also wrote social and political satires aimed at socio-economic inequalities and exploitation of the underprivileged.

A progressive and humanist poet, he chose to approach history and reality directly and his verse combined oratorical vigour with a declamatory diction. The theme of Urvashi revolves round love, passion, and the relationship of man and woman on a spiritual plane, distinct from their earthly relationship.

His Kurukshetra is a narrative poem based on the Santi Parva of the Mahābhārata. It was written at a time when the memories of the Second World War were fresh in the mind of the poet. Nine verses from this larger poem were excerpted to form the power-packed short poem Shakti aur Kshama, which would form part of NCERT's Hindi syllabus for class VII. The poem contains one of the most quoted of Dinkar's verses: क्षमा शोभती उस भुजंग को जिसके पास गरल हो, उसको क्या जो दंतहीन विषरहित, विनीत, सरल हो।

His Samdheni is a collection of poems reflecting the poet's social concern transcending the boundaries of the nation.

His Rashmirathi (1952) is considered among the best retellings of the life of Karna of the Hindu epic Mahābhārata. A section from it describing the events immediately leading up to the Kurukshetra War in the Mahābhārata is often excerpted under the title Krishna Ki Chetavani [Krishna's Warning].

=== Sanskriti ke Char Adhyaya ===
In his Sanskriti ke Chaar Adhyaya, he said that despite various cultures, languages and topography, India stands united, because "however different we may be, our thoughts are one and the same". Dinkar made the understanding of historical perspectives much more direct by looking at the history of India's culture in terms of four major encounters: the autochthons (indigenous people); between Vedic beliefs and the philosophy propounded by the Buddha, as well as by Mahavira; between Hinduism and Islam; and finally between European civilisation and the Indian way of life and learning. These encounters at different periods of history have imparted strength to India's culture. The most striking feature of India's civilizational history has been its marked tolerance and human approach with its potential to impart a message to the world.

History is not merely a compilation of facts. History is written from an ideological perspective. The poet Dinkar wrote Sanskriti ke char adhyaya in the context of values emerging from the freedom movement. The nationalist view of history, which was propounded in the field of history, is propounded by Dinkar in the field of culture. The values which developed in the context of the freedom movement determine the perspective of this book. Those values are anti-colonialism, secularism and the idea of integrated culture. This book has been written around these very values. Dinkar is the nationalist historian of Indian culture.

Divided into four vast chapters, in the first chapter, the form and development of the culture of India from pre-Vedic times to around the middle of the 20th century has been discussed. In the second chapter the Buddhist and Jain religions which grew as a revolt against ancient Hinduism have been analysed. In the third chapter, the influence of Islam on Hindu culture after its advent along with the influence of Islam on Hindu-Muslim relations, like – nature, language, art and culture has been studied. In this chapter a very authentic investigation into the mutual relation between the Bhakti movement and Islam has been presented. In this context, it has also been considered how the culture of India acquires an integrated form. In the fourth chapter, a comprehensive account of the colonialisation of education and the clash of Christianity with Hinduism, etc., since the arrival of Europeans in India has also been given. In this chapter, along with an inquiry into the Renaissance of the 19th century, the contributions of the leading leaders of the Renaissance have been comprehensively discussed. A leading characteristic of this chapter is also that a copious account of the Hindu Renaissance and with it of the Muslim Renaissance and its limitations have been presented.

Dinkar :

Examples of inter-mixture and cultural harmony among peoples belonging to different races, languages and faiths are available in some other countries too (such as Mexico and Ancient Greece), but not to the same extent as in India. In the world there are but four colours of people – white, wheatish, black and yellow – and all four are profusely inter-mixed in the Indian populace. Even linguistically, the offspring of all the major language families live together in this country. And as for religion, India as a whole has always been, from the beginning, a land common to all the major religions of the world. The Indians of Tiruvankur had become Christian long before the people of England, and Islam had perhaps already arrived among the Moplas while Prophet Mohammad was still alive. Similarly, the followers of Zoroaster have been inhabiting India since the tenth century. When the Arab Muslims occupied Iran and began to propagate their own religion there, the Parsis fled Iran and came to settle in India. When the Jewish temples began to crumble under the Roman tyranny, a number of Jews fled to India in order to save their faith, and ever since they have been living happily in South India. Therefore, Christianity, Islam, Judaism and Parsi religions have as much a claim over India as Hinduism or Buddhism has.

The vast panoramic overview of Dinkar's historiography of India's composite culture verges on a kind of Darwinist evolutionism. The idea of India of Dinkar's imagination is reminiscent of the American 'melting pot' model of assimilative nationalism.

== Awards and honours ==
He received awards from Kashi Nagri Pracharini Sabha, Uttar Pradesh Government and also an award by the Government of India for his epic poem Kurukshetra. He received the Sahitya Akademi Award in 1959 for his work Sanskriti ke char adhyay. He was also a recipient of Padma Bhushan in 1959 by the Government of India. He was awarded the LLD degree by Bhagalpur University. He was felicitated as Vidyavachaspati by Gurukul Mahavidyalaya. He was felicitated as Sahitya-Chudaman by Rajasthan Vidyapeeth, Udaipur on 8 November 1968. Dinkar was awarded the Jnanpith Award in 1972 for Urvashi. He also became a nominated member of the Rajya Sabha, in 1952. Dinkar's fans widely believe that he truly deserved the honour of RashtraKavi (poet of India).

== Death ==
Dinkar died on 24 April 1974 in Madras (now Chennai) after suffering a heart attack. His body was flown to Patna on 25 April and cremated on the bank of river Ganges.

== Legacy ==
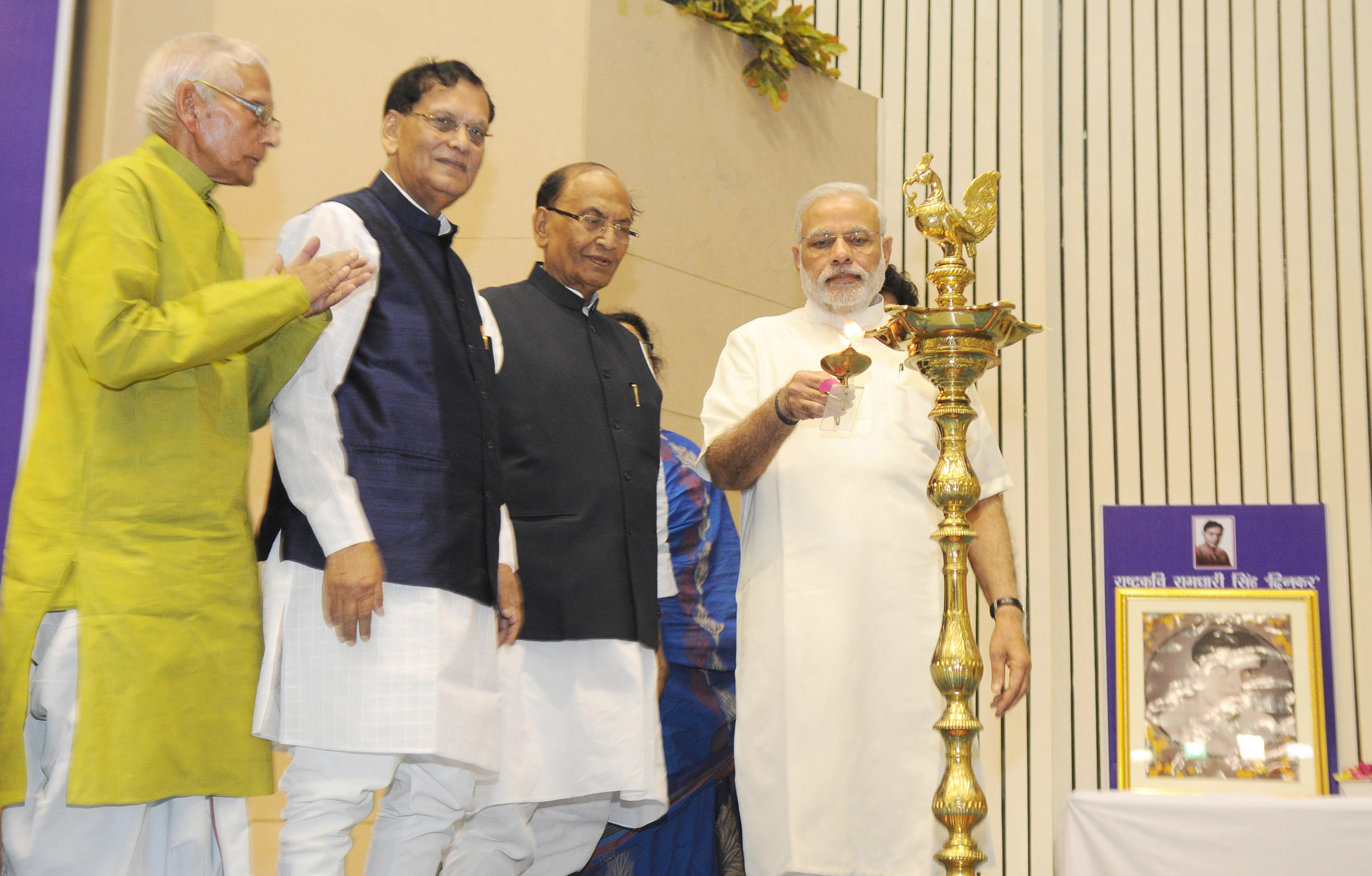
The Prime Minister, Shri Narendra Modi lighting the lamp at the Golden Jubilee celebrations of the works of Rashtrakavi Ramdhari Singh Dinkar, in New Delhi on 22 May 2015

On 30 September 1987, to mark his 79th birth anniversary, tributes were paid to him by the then President of India, Shankar Dayal Sharma.

In 1999, Dinkar was one of the Hindi writers featured on a set of commemorative postal stamps released by Government of India to celebrate the linguistic harmony of India, marking the 50th anniversary since India adopted Hindi as its official language.

The government released a book on Dinkar's birth centenary authored by Khagendra Thakur.

At the same time a statue of him was unveiled in Patna at the Dinkar Chowk, and a two-day national seminar was organised in Calicut University.

The Chief Minister of Bihar, Nitish Kumar, inaugurated an engineering college Rastrakavi Ramdhari Singh Dinkar College of Engineering in the district of Begusarai named after the legendary Hindi poet Ramdhari Singh Dinkar.

On 22 May 2015 Prime Minister Narendra Modi inaugurated golden jubilee celebrations of Dinkar's notable works Sanskriti ke Chaar Adhyaye and Parshuram ki Pratiksha at Vigyan Bhavan, New Delhi.

== Major poetic works ==
Dinkar's first published work of poetry was Vijay Sandesh (1928). His other works are:

- Pranbhang (1929)
- Renuka (1935)
- Hunkar (epic poem) (1938)
- Rasavanti (1939)
- Dvandvageet (1940)
- Kurukshetra (1946)
- Dhoop Chhah (1946)
- Saamdheni (1947)
- Baapu (1947)
- Itihas ke Aansoo (1951)
- Dhup aur Dhuan (1951)
- Mirch ka Mazaa (1951)
- Rashmirathi (1952)
- Dilli (1954)
- Neem ke Patte (1954)
- Suraj ka Byaah (1955)
- Neel Kusum (1954)
- Samar Shesh Hai (1954)
- Chakravaal (1956)
- Kavishri (1957)
- Seepee aur Shankh (1957)
- Naye Subhaashit (1957)
- Ramdhari Singh 'Dinkar'
- Urvashi (1961)
- Parashuram ki Pratiksha (1963)
- Koylaa aur Kavitva (1964)
- Mritti Tilak (1964)
- Atmaa ki Ankhe (1964)
- Haare ko Harinaam (1970)
- Bhagvaan Ke Daakiye (1970)

== Anthologies ==
- Lokpriya Kavi Dinkar (1960)
- Dinkar ki Suktiyan (1964)
- Dinkar ke Geet (1973)
- Sanchayita (1973)
- Rashmilok (1974)
- Urvashi tatha anya shringarik kavitayen (1974)
- Amrit Manthan, Lokbharti Prakashan, New Delhi, 2008.
- Bhagn Vina, Lokbharti Prakashan, New Delhi, 2008.
- Sapnon ka Dhuan, Lokbharti Prakashan, New Delhi, 2008.
- Samanantar, Lokbharti Prakashan, New Delhi, 2008.
- Rashmimala, Lokbharti Prakashan, New Delhi, 2008.
- Kavita ki Pukar, Vani Prakashan, New Delhi, 2017.

== Major prose works ==
Dinkar's major analytical and other prose works are:

- Mitti ki Or (1946)
- Chittaur ka Saakaa (1948)
- Ardhanaarishwar (1952)
- Reti ki Phool (1954)
- Hamaari Saanskritik Ekta (1954)
- Bhaarat ki Saanskritik Kahaani (1955)
- Raashtrabhaasha aur Raashtriya Ekta (1955)
- Ujli Aag (1956)
- Sanskriti ke Chaar Adhyaay (1956)
- Kaavya ki Bhumikaa (1958)
- Pant, Prasad aur Maithilisharan (1958)
- Venu Van (1958)
- Dharma, Naitikataa aur Vigyan (1959)
- Vat-Peepal (1961)
- Lokdev Nehru (1965)
- Shuddh Kavitaa ki Khoj (1966)
- Saahityamukhi (1968)
- He Ram! (1968)
- Samsmaran aur Shraddhaanjaliyan (1970)
- Meri Yatrayen (1971)
- Bhaaratiya Ekta (1971)
- Dinkar ki Daayri (1973)
- Chetana ki Shilaa (1973)
- Vivah ki Musibaten (1973)
- Aadhunik Bodh (1973)

== Literary criticism ==
- Sahitya aur Samaj, Lokbharti Prakashan, New Delhi, 2008.
- Chintan ke Aayam, Lokbharti Prakashan, New Delhi, 2008.
- Kavi aur Kavita, Lokbharti Prakashan, New Delhi, 2008.
- Sanskriti Bhasha aur Rashtra, Lokbharti Prakashan, New Delhi, 2008.
- Kavita aur Shuddh Kavita, Lokbharti Prakashan, New Delhi, 2008.

== Biographies ==
- Sri Aurobindo: Meri Drishti Mein, Lokbharti Prakashan, New Delhi, 2008.
- Pandit Nehru aur anya mahapurush, Lokbharti Prakashan, New Delhi, 2008.
- Smarnanjali, Lokbharti Prakashan, New Delhi, 2008.
- Dinkarnama, Dr Diwakar, 2008.

== Translations ==
- Meghduta translated by Ramdhari Singh Dinkar. In Rabindra Rachna Sanchayan, edited by Asit Kumar Bandopadhyaya, Sahitya Akademi, Delhi.
- Rabindranath ki kavitayen (101 selected poems of Tagore) translated by Ramdhari Singh Dinkar along with Hazari Prasad Dwivedi, Hans Kumar Tiwari, and Bhawani Prasad Mishra, Sahitya Akademi, ISBN 81-260-1216-1, 2001 (reprint).

== Translations into Hindi and other languages ==
- Dinkar's Urvashi: a saga of human love and Vedanta. Trans. by Krishna Kumar Vidyarthi. (New Delhi: Siddharth Publications, 1994. 165 p.)
- Reflections on men and things (essays). (Ajmer: Krishna Brothers, 1968. 80 p.)
- Kurukshetra. Trans. by R.K. Kapur. London: n.p., 1967.
- [Rasmirathi] Sun charioteer. Trans. by R.D. Dunda, D. Nelson and P. Staneslow. (Minnesota: Nagari Press, 1981.)
- Voices of the Himalaya: poems. Trans. by the author, Kamala Ratnam, V.K. Gokak and others. (Bombay: Asia Publishing House, 1966. vi, 70 p.)
- Himalayas Xotros Poems (Spanish), Collection of thirty poems, Publisher – University of Conceyeion, Chile.
- Sining Potos [Blue Lotus] (Russian), Collection of sixty poems, Progress Publishers, Moscow, Russia.
- Kurukshetra: an aftermath of war, a new search for peace from the classical thought : light radiates through dialogue; translated by Winand M. Callewaert, P. Adeswara Rao; Heritage Publication Division, 1995.
- Ramdhari Singh Dinkar, Reflections on men and things, Krishna Bros., 1968.

== See also ==
- List of Indian writers
- List of Indian poets
