= Basawon Singh =

Indian independence activist (1909–1989)

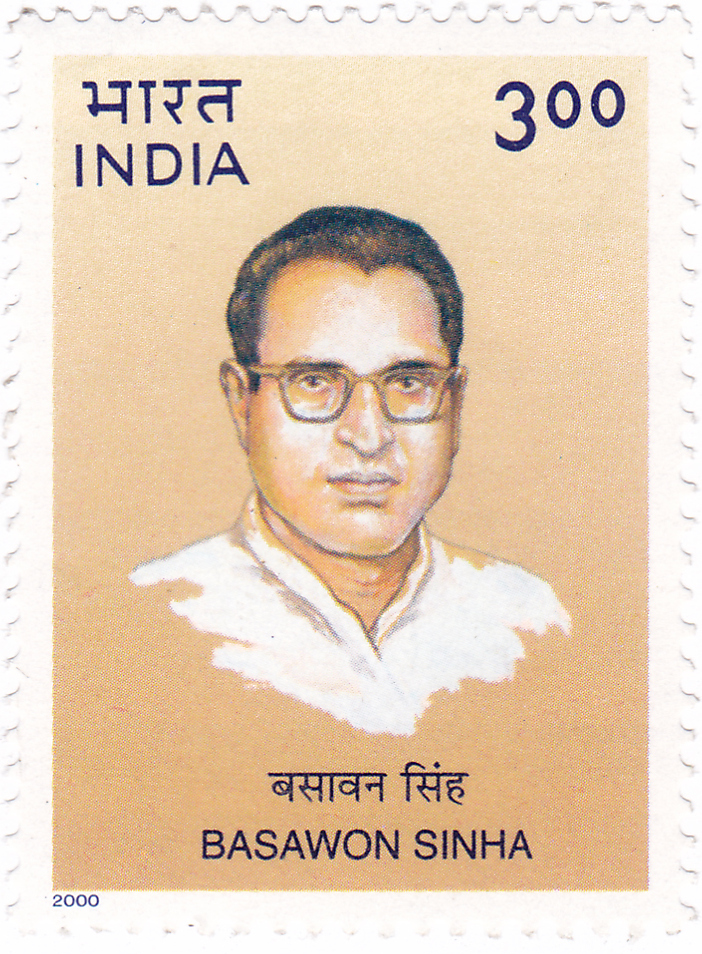
Basawon Singh on a 2000 stamp of India

Basawon Singh or Basawan Singh, also known as Basawon Sinha (23 March 1909 – 7 April 1989), was an Indian independence activist and a campaigner for the rights of the underprivileged, and industrial and agricultural workers.

He spent a total of 18 and a half years in prisons in British India as a consequence of his support for independence and he was committed to democratic socialism.

Along with Yogendra Shukla, he was a founder member of the Congress Socialist Party, a socialist caucus within the Indian National Congress, in Bihar. Among his revolutionary colleagues and friends he was called Lambad because of being very tall.

== Early life ==
Basawon Singh was born in Jamalpur (Subhai), Hajipur, Bihar on 23 March 1909 in a poor family. An only son, he lost his father at the age of Eight. He had come from a small farmer's family Background. At the age of ten he ran off to Hajipur to see and hear Mahatma Gandhi. A brilliant student, he secured scholarships in both primary and middle schools. Thereafter, he joined Dighi High School. He used to teach older boys for food and lodging. His mother sold a bamboo every month for two rupees to meet his other school expenses.

Singh passed Matriculation Examination with a high first division in 1926 and began studies at G. B. B. College.

== Revolutionary ==
During last two years of school Singh came in close contact with revolutionaries, with Yogendra Shukla, the head of the Hindustan Socialist Republican Army (HSRA), as his mentor. Soon after joining the HSRA in 1925, Singh was rusticated from G. B. B. College, thus ending his formal education. He was subsequently involved with Bihar Vidyapeeth at Sadakat Ashram in Patna, where he undertook intensive military training with a small group of youths.

Singh absconded in 1929 after the Lahore Conspiracy Case. He was co-accused in the Bhusawal, Kakori, Tirhut and Deluaha conspiracy cases. He carried on the movement along with Chandrashekhar Azad and Keshab Chakravarty. He was sentenced to seven years in prison but escaped from Bankipore Central jail in June 1930 after three days. He was re-arrested and sent to Bhagalpur Central Jail.

While at Bhagalpur, Singh undertook a fast unto death as a protest against what he thought were the prevailing inhuman conditions in jail. On the 12th day of the fast he was moved to Gaya Central Jail and kept in solitary confinement. Soon he was shifted to the jail's hospital. All efforts of forced feeding him failed, Sir Ganesh Dutt, the then minister of Bihar, asked Singh's mother, Daulat Kuer, to attend to urge him to give up his fast. When she attended, on the 50th day of the fast, she blessed him.

People waited daily at the jail gate to receive Singh's body should he die. All political prisoners in the jail were also on fast for the last few days in solidarity with him but on the 58th day he broke his fast after being informed by Gandhi that his demands had been met. He was released from jail in June 1936 because of his poor health but the city act was imposed on him to restrict his movement. He violated the restrictions and was again arrested.

Singh studied subjects such as history, geography, political science, philosophy, social sciences and natural sciences during his imprisonments. He had a photographic memory.

=== Politics and trade union work ===
Singh was active in the trades union movement from 1936 until his death in 1989. He joined the Congress Socialist Party in December 1936 and was appointed its labour secretary. He established trade unions in the coal fields, sugar mills, mica mines and railways of Bihar. He formed Japla labour union and Baulia Labour union in 1937, organised the workers of Jamalpur Workshop along with Shivnath Bannerjee, formed the Gaya cotton and Jute Mill Labour Union, formed the Tata Collieries Labour Association along with Subhas Chandra Bose and went on to become the latter organisation's president when Bose left India in 1941. He organised coal workers of Talcher with close co-ordination and support of Dukhabandhu Mishra (founder member of HMS union in Talcher coalfields), Rajgangpur (Orissa) and Satna (MP); established Mica Workers Union, Gomia Labour Union (Explosives), later these unions affiliated to HMS. He was active in AIRF from 1936, president of OT Railway Union from Agra to Nefa and NE Railway Mazdoor Union.

He was rearrested in April 1937 along with Jayaprakash Narayan, Benipuri and others in Patna for "unconstitutional" works for six months. During the Second World War he was the first man in Bihar to be arrested under Defence of India Ordinance on 26 January 1940 in Husainabad, Palamu and released after eighteen months. During the Quit India Movement, after the interception of Jayaprakash Narayan's Deoli letter addressed to him, he went underground in 1941 and went to Afghanistan to collect firearms and ammunition. He attended the Bombay AICC session (9 August 1942) and conducted the movement from the underground. He was held in Delhi on 8 January 1943 to be freed only on 3 April 1946 after which he continued his nationalist and trade union work.

=== Trade union movement ===
With Shibnath Bannerjee he worked very hard to form the railway men's union from 1936 onwards. He unionized the workers of Japla, Baulia, and Dalmianagar in Shahabad; Gaya, Jamshedpur and Kanda; of the coalfields of Jharia, Hazaribagh, Kumardhubi; workers of Patna City, Jamalpur; the sugar factory workers of Harinagar and Marhawra; the workers of Talcher and Rajgangpur in Orissa; and Satna in the Central Provinces.

Subsequent to the Second World War, the trade union movement gained urgency and strength on account of the untiring efforts of Basawon Singh. He organised the workers on various fields such as sugar, coal, cement, mica, explosives, aluminium, iron and steel industries, railways, post-offices and banks, etc. He was one of the founders of the Hind Mazdoor Sabha, and its president at the state and central levels.

Basawon Singh was actively involved with the All India Railwaymen's Federation since 1936 onwards. He was the President of the Oudh Tirhoot (O.T.) Railway Union and the North East Railway Mazdoor Union for several years and since 1946 the vice-president (acting President because Subhas Chandra Bose was the President and he had escaped from India by then) of the All-India Railwaymen's Federation.

=== Dalmianagar and 30 Days' Fast Unto Death ===
Before independence Basawon Singh worked in the trade union movement with unabated zeal for the cause of democratic socialism, because trade unionism was one of the major factors for social change and social justice. Early in October 1938, he was arrested in Dalmianagar under Section 107 of C.P.C. with 6 other leaders for his regular meetings and organising an intensive strike of about 2400 men. In the course of the trade union movement, this prominent socialist leader often resorted to the Gandhian method of fasting to protest against the injustice meted out to workers. On 12 January 1949 he was arrested in Dalmianagar under the Bihar Maintenance of Public Order Act and he was released at the end of March. Afterwards he undertook hunger strike for 30 days in Dalmianagar for the cause of workers. Prime Minister of India, Jawaharlal Nehru and his friend and socialist colleague Jayaprakash Narayan intervened and Rajendra Prasad became the arbitrator, only then Basawon Babu broke his fast on the 31st day.

=== Second World War and Quit India Movement ===
Subsequent to the making of India a participant in the Second World War, the Congress Ministry in Bihar headed by Shri Krishna Sinha tendered resignation on 31 October 1939. Singh was the first Bihari who observed the Independence Day on 26 January 1940 by taking out an unlicensed procession and delivering an anti-war speech at Japla. Consequently, a warrant was issued by the Deputy Commissioner of Palamau. A case was instituted against him under the Defence of India Rules for an objectionable speech delivered at Japla. He was convicted at Daltonganj and sentenced to suffer 18 months rigorous imprisonment under the Defence of India Rules. He was kept in the T. Cell of the Hazaribagh Central Jail while Narayan was arrested on 18 February 1940. Narayan and other socialist leaders, including Ganga Sharan Singh, were kept in different cells. Basawon Singh was released in July 1941.

Basawon Singh played an important role in the Quit India Movement. On 12 April 1942, he addressed the Palamau District Political Conference attended by thousands of people including a large number of tribal people mostly consisting of Kherwars and Kisans. In the next week he delivered a speech with Reasat Karim of Dehri in the conference of Socialist group of Kisan Sabha held on 18 and 19 April 1942 at Patepur in Muzaffarpur which was presided over by Abdul Hayat Chand of Patna. On the eve of the August Rebellion, Singh was blacklisted in Group "A" as Labour, Socialist and Terrorist Leader, classification I with Deep Narayan Singh, Rambriksh Benipuri, Narayan Prasad Verma, Bir Chand Patel and other leaders of Muzaffarpur District by the colonial government of Bihar Province. He went underground and organised his guerilla band of freedom fighters in the dense forest of Palamau. The subsequent activities of Singh encouraged the escape of six socialist leaders, namely Shukla, Narayan, Pandit Ramnandan Mishra, Suraj Narayan Singh, Shaligram Singh, Gulab Chand Gupta and Gulali Sonar from Hazaribagh Central Jail on Diwali night on 9 November 1942. Narayan was willing to meet with Singh to spell out the programme to overthrow the British Raj through armed struggle.

Singh was again rounded up in Delhi on 7 January 1943. He was incarcerated in cross-bars and fetters in the condemned cells of the Red Fort dungeons, Delhi Jail, and Bankipur, Gaya, Bhagalpur and Hazaribagh Central Jail. He was released in April 1947 subsequent to the formation of the Congress Ministry in Bihar headed by Shri Krishna Sinha on 2 April 1946.

== In independent India ==
He was a member of the National Executive of the Socialist Party. He is the founder of HMS (Hind Mazdoor Sabha), one of the six national federations affiliated to the Socialists. He was held for Gomia strike in 1965 fighting for the rights of workers.

=== Socialist leadership ===
In February 1948, the Congress Socialist Party delinked itself from the Congress. Singh was a prominent leader of Socialist Party until its merger with other political parties to form the Janata Party and its government in Bihar as well as in India in 1977. He was a member of the national executive of the Socialist Party from 1939 till 1977 and for many years as its state President.

He won from Dehri-on-Sone in the first General Elections of 1952 and became an important opposition leader from 1952 until 1962. He was a Member of legislative Council from 1962 to 1968. He became one of the most powerful Cabinet Ministers (Cabinet Minister of Labour, Planning and Industry) in the 1967 Coalition Government. During the Emergency of 1975 he stayed underground for 20 months conducting the movement and his wife was jailed under MISA as a potential "threat" to the Government.

In 1977 he was elected from Dehri-on-Sone and again becomes the Cabinet Minister for Labour, Planning and Industry in the Janata Party government in the state. He died on 7 April 1989.

His wife Kamala Sinha, a grandniece of Jan Sangh founder Syama Prasad Mukherjee was also an Indian politician and diplomat. She was twice elected to the Rajya Sabha from 1990 to 2000, and later served as Ambassador to Suriname and Barbados. She also became the first woman Union Minister of State (MoS) for external affairs in the cabinet of I. K. Gujral.

=== Travels abroad ===
Basawon Singh had broad knowledge and was known for his scholarship among the Indian Independence Movement activists. He represented the country on various occasions. For the first time he paid a visit to Rangoon in 1950. In 1951, he was a delegate to the First Asian Socialist Conference held at Rangoon. In 1954, he went to China and he led the Indian Delegation to participate in the May Day Celebration. In 1956, he represented the Hind Mazdoor Sabha in the annual conference of the Japan Trade Union at Domei. In the same year, he went to the Soviet Union and led the Indian delegation to participate in the May Day celebration. He visited the United States in 1984 on the invitation of the American Federation of Labour Congress of Industrial Workers Organization.

== Recognition ==
The Government of India issued a commemorative stamp in his name on 23 March 2000. There is an indoor stadium named Basawan Singh Indoor Stadium in the city of Hajipur in Bihar.
