= Asoka Mehta =

Indian politician

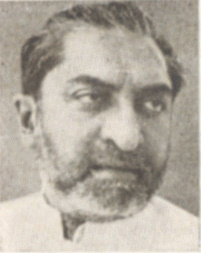

Member of parliament, Lok Sabha
- In office 1954-1962, 1967–1971

Minister of Planning, Petroleum and Chemicals
- In office 1966-1969
- Preceded by: Bali Ram Bhagat (Minister of Planning)
- Succeeded by: unknown
- Preceded by: O. V. Alagesan (Minister of Petroleum and Chemicals)
- Succeeded by: unknown

Personal details
- Born: 24 October 1911 Bhavnagar, Bhavnagar State, British Raj
- Died: 10 December 1984 (aged 73) New Delhi, India
- Party: Indian National Congress

Asoka Mehta (24 October 1911, Bhavnagar – 10 December 1984, New Delhi) was an Indian political activist and socialist politician. He helped organize the socialist wing Congress Socialist Party of the Indian National Congress, along with Rambriksh Benipuri, Jaya Prakash Narayan, and was heavily involved in the politics and government of the city of Bombay.

== Early life and education ==
Ashok Mehta was born in Bhavnagar on 24 October 1911 to Ranjitram Mehta, a Gujarati writer. He completed his primary education from Ahmedabad and Sholapur. He graduated from Bombay University in 1931 where he was introduced to Swadeshi Movement.

== Career ==
He was imprisoned in 1932 for participating in Civil Disobedience Movement. Mehta was an active participant during the Quit India Movement in 1942 and was arrested by the British. He was sentenced to rigorous imprisonment five times.

After India's independence, he helped organize trade unions in Bombay and was one of the founders of Indian National Trade Union Congress.

He also served as Mayor of Bombay city from 1946 to 1947. Mehta retired from active politics in the early 1950s, and wrote several books on his experiences, on India's freedom struggle, and on the importance of socialist reforms. In 1950, he was elected as the president of the eighth session of Socialist Party.

Ashoka Mehta was a founder member of Socialist Party and when, in September 1952, the Kisan Mazdoor Praja Party and the Socialist Party merged to form the Praja Socialist Party (PSP) in which the major cementing role was played by Ram Manohar Lohia and Mehta, Asoka Mehta was appointed the General Secretary of the Praja Socialist Party (PSP) and later served as the President of the party from the year 1959 to 1963.

He was a founding member of the first Governing Body of National Council of Applied Economic Research in New Delhi, India’s first independent economic policy institute, established in 1956. In 1963, he served as deputy chairman of the Planning Commission. He also served as a Union Minister after 1964. He agreed to be appointed the Deputy Chairman of the Planning Commission.

He joined Indian National Congress in 1964, after his expulsion from Praja Socialist Party. After Congress split in 1969 and the faction Congress (I) was led by Indira Gandhi, Mehta was part of the Congress (O) faction.

He was a member of 1st and 2nd Lok Sabha during 1954-1957 and 1957-1962. He was elected third time for 4th Lok Sabha from Bhandara. He was a member of Rajya Sabha from 3 April 1966 to 26 February 1967.

He was arrested during the Emergency on 26 June 1975 and detained in Rohtak Jail, Haryana.

In 1977 he was the Chairman of Ashok Mehta Committee under the Janata government.

He died in New Delhi on 10 December 1984.

== Major works ==
He is author of following noted books:

- Economic Planning in India
- Who Owns India? (1950)
- Democratic Socialism (Bharatiya Vidya Bhavan)
- Studies in Socialism (Bharatiya Vidya Bhavan)
- Reflections on Socialist Era (C. Chand and Co.)
