= Loknayak (film) =

- Directed by: Prakash Jha
- Screenplay by: Prakash Jha
- Story by: Prakash Jha
- Produced by: Prakash Jha
- Starring: Chetan Pandit; Tisca Chopra; Tom Alter
- Cinematography: Arvind Kumar
- Edited by: Irene Dhar Malik
- Release date: 6 December 2004
- Running time: 112 minutes
- Country: India
- Language: Hindi
- Budget: ₹90 lakh

Loknayak is a 2004 biographical film based on the life of Jayaprakash Narayan. It was directed by Prakash Jha. Chetan Pandit played the role of Jayaprakash Narayan and Tisca Chopra played role of Prabhavati Devi, wife of JP Narayan.

== Cast ==
- Chetan Pandit as Jayaprakash Narayan
- Tisca Chopra as Prabhavati Devi
- Tom Alter as Abul Kalam Azad
- Gyan Dev Singh as Vinoba Bhave
- Ashok Chauhan as Mahatma Gandhi
- Meenakshi Thakur as Kasturba
- Ashok Banthia as Ram Manohar Lohia
- Atul Srivastava as Lal Bahadur Shastri

=== Filming ===
Loknayak was shot in Hazaribag, Patna, Sitab Diara, Chhapra (birthplace of JP), Mumbai and Satara. The film was made at the budget of ₹90 lakh for the Ministry of Culture. Prakash Jha made the story on the basis of in-depth research along with interviews of eminent personalities like Sachchidananda Sinha, Chandra Shekhar, Atal Bihari Vajpayee, L. K. Advani and Bimal Prasad.

Prakash Jha shot a scene in Jayaprakash Narayan Central Jail (earlier named Hazaribagh Central jail) to re-create the incident when JP, with Shaligram Singh, Suraj Nayaran Singh, Ramanandan Mishra, Yogendra Shukla and Gulab Chand Gupta (Gulabi Sonar) escaped from the jail on 9 November 1942.
