= Kamala Sinha =

Indian politician and diplomat

Personal details
- Born: 30 September 1932 Dhaka, Bengal Presidency, British India
- Died: 31 December 2014 (aged 82) Syracuse, New York, U.S.

Kamala (Kamla) Sinha (30 September 1932 – 31 December 2014) was an Indian politician and diplomat. She was twice elected to the Rajya Sabha from 1990 to 2000, and later served as Ambassador to Suriname and Barbados. She was also Union Minister of State (MoS) for external affairs (Independent Charge) in the cabinet of I. K. Gujral. She died in Syracuse, New York, on December 31, 2014, aged 82.

== Personal life ==
Born in Dhaka (now in Bangladesh) on September 30, 1932, Sinha, a grandniece of Jan Sangh founder Syama Prasad Mukherjee, was married to Basawon Sinha, revolutionary, nationalist, socialist, trade unionist and the first leader of opposition in Bihar.

== Politics ==
A two-term member of Bihar legislative council between 1972–84 and also a two-term member of Rajya Sabha, she had been a member of various committees. Her husband Basawon Sinha was a freedom fighter and colleague of Jayaprakash Narayan and Karpoori Thakur. She was detained under Maintenance of Internal Security Act (MISA) during the JP-led movement. She had been president of Hind Mazdoor Sabha for several years (the only woman to have ever become President of a central labour federation) and travelled extensively across the world in several capacities.
