= Hunkar (epic poem) =

Poem by Ramdhari Singh Dinkar

Hunkar is an epic poem by Rashtrakavi Ramdhari Singh 'Dinkar'. In this work, Dinkar referred to himself for the first time as the Yuga-Chāraṇa or 'Charan of the Era'. Himalaya is from the collection Hunkar (A Roar) which has been described by a critic as burning coals in the shade of playful rainbow. Here, the loftiness of the Himalayas reflects metaphorically the Mahatma, whom he invokes to rise to action, leaving the path of the mystical meditation of the ascetic.

Selected translated stanzas include:

My king of mountains! My magnificent one!
Radiant embodiment of great glory!
Flame of fierce, accumulated prowess!
Snowy diadem of my motherland!
Effulgent brow of my Bharat!
My king of mountains! My magnificent one!

Unvanquished, unfettered, free through the ages,
Sacred, righteously proud and great through the ages,
What glory have you been radiating
Through the ages in the limitless sky?
How unbroken is your eternal meditation!
Sages of sages! How unending your concentration!
Pouring into infinite space, what intricate problems
Do you seek to solve?
What intractable web of perplexities?
My king of mountains! My magnificent one!

O sage engrossed in silent tapasya!
Open your eyes at least for a moment!
Our country is burning, in flames
Writhing restlessly at your feet!
The blessed Indus, the five rivers, Brahmaputra
Ganga and Yamuna - the nectar-swept streams
That flow to the blessed land
Are abundant with your melting compassion.
At the gates of that land,
You, the guardian of its borders,
Have challenged, 'You must cut off my head
Before you can trample over this land.
O pious sage, a great misfortune has fallen today
On that same land of piety!
Afflicted, the children are writhing
Bitten by countless snakes from four directions.
My king of mountains! My magnificent one!
