= Parshuram Ki Pratiksha =

Epic poem

- Author: Ramdhari Singh 'Dinkar'
- Language: Hindi
- Publisher: Lok Bharatiya Prakashan ,Prayagraj
- Publication date: 1993
- Publication place: India
- Media type: Print
- ISBN: 9788185341132

Parshuram ki Pratiksha(Hindi: परशुराम की प्रतीक्षा) is a collection of poems and a book of poetry written by Ramdhari Singh Dinkar based on a social theme. About eighteen poems are included in this poetry collection.
