= Rashmirathi =

Hindi epic poem

- Author: Ramdhari Singh 'Dinkar'
- Original title: रश्मिरथी
- Language: Hindi
- Publisher: Lok Bharti Prakashan, Prayagraj (1st edition)
- Publication date: 1952
- Publication place: India
- Media type: Print
- ISBN: 978-81-8031-362-2

Rashmirathi (Hindi: रश्मिरथी, lit. Rider of the chariot of light; from Rashmi – ray of light and Rathi – one who rides a chariot) is a Hindi epic poem written in 1952 by the poet Ramdhari Singh 'Dinkar'.

The poem narrates the story of Karna, one of the central characters of the Hindu epic Mahabharata.

== About the poem ==
Karna was the first-born son of Kunti. She abandoned him at birth, as he was conceived before her marriage. Karna was born through a boon granted by Surya (the Sun God). He was raised in the household of charioteers and faced lifelong struggles to rise above his perceived lowly status, eventually becoming a renowned warrior and a central figure in the Mahabharata.

During the Kurukshetra War, Karna fought on the side of Duryodhana, who had recognized his abilities, made him a king, and accepted him as a close friend. Karna’s presence on the Kaurava side caused great concern for the Pandavas, as he was reputed to be nearly unconquerable in battle.

On the eve of the war, Kunti approached Karna and urged him to join the Pandavas, revealing that he was her firstborn and therefore their elder brother. According to Ramdhari Singh 'Dinkar' in Rashmirathi, Karna replied that although he foresaw the Kauravas’ defeat, his loyalty to Duryodhana bound him to fight on their side. He described the war as ultimately futile, yet considered it his destiny to fulfill his role.

== Adaptations ==
The Hindi film Gulaal (2009), directed by Anurag Kashyap, features a rendition of Dinkar's poem "Ye dekh gagan mujh mein lay hai" (part of Krishna ki Chetavani from Rashmirathi chapter 3), performed by Piyush Mishra.

A stage adaptation of Rashmirathii has been directed by Dr. Shakuntala Shukla and Vyomesh Shukla under the banner of Roopvani, Varanasi. The play presents the story from the perspective of Kunti and has reportedly been performed 47 times.

The Prime Minister of India, Narendra Modi, praised the English translation of Rashmirathi by Mauritian cultural activist Leela Gujadhur Sarup, describing it as "the story of a man blessed by the Gods but rejected by Destiny." He called Rashmirathi the magnum opus of Dinkar and commended Sarup’s translation as a labor of love that would allow non-Hindi readers to appreciate Dinkar's poetry.

== Translations ==
- Dinkar, Ramdhari Singh; Muṇḍā, Ramadayal (1981). The Sun Charioteer. Nagari Press.
