= White House Compound (Gaya) =

White House Compound व्हाइट हाउस कंपाउंड (Hindi) وائٹ ہاؤس کمپاؤنڈ (Urdu)
- Neighbourhood
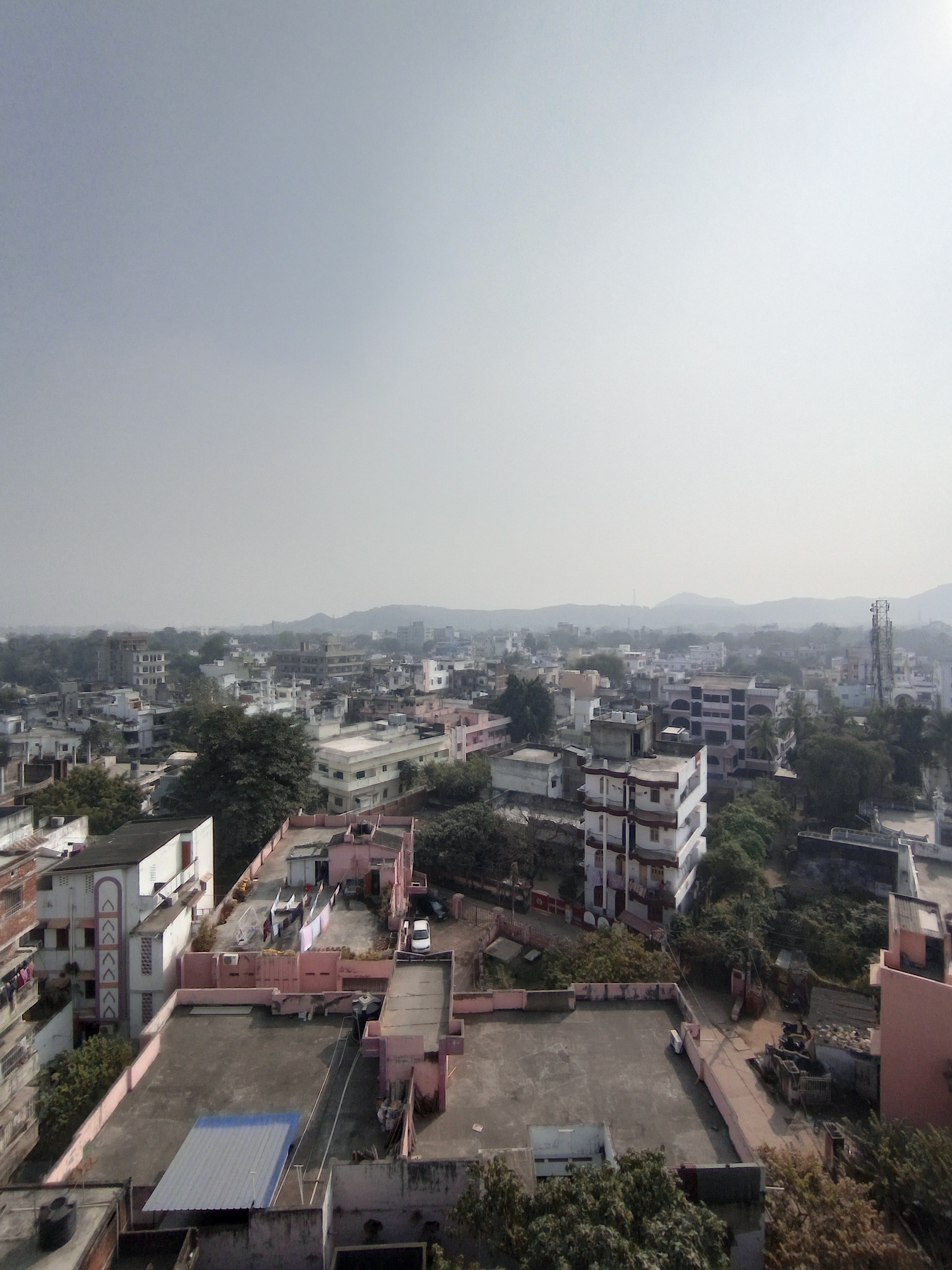

- Location within Bihar
- Coordinates: 24°47′20″N 84°59′29″E
- Country: India
- State: Bihar
- City: Gaya

Government
  - Body: Gaya Nagar Nigam

Language
  - Official: Hindi, Urdu
  - Spoken: Magadhi, Hindi, Urdu
- Time zone: UTC+5:30
- PIN: 823001

White House Compound (Hindi: व्हाइट हाउस कंपाउंड, Urdu: وائٹ ہاؤس کمپاؤنڈ) is a residential locality in Judges Colony under the Rampur thana jurisdiction of Gaya, Bihar, India. It serves the Mirza Ghalib College and Smart Bazaar earlier Big Bazaar Mall.
