= Asoka Mehta Committee =

Indian government committee on local governance

In December 1977, the Janata Government appointed a committee on Panchayati Raj institutions under the chairmanship of Asoka Mehta. The committee submitted its report in August 1978 and made 132 recommendations to revive and strengthen the declining Panchayati Raj system in the country. As a result of this report, the Indian states of Karnataka, Andhra Pradesh, and West Bengal passed new legislation. However, the flow of politics at the state level did not allow the institutions to develop their own political dynamics.

== Recommendations ==
The main recommendations of the committee were:

1. The 3-tier system of Panchayati Raj should be replaced by the 2-tier system: Zilla Parishad at the district level, and below it, the Mandal Panchayat consisting of a group of villages covering a population of 15000 to 20000.
2. A district should be the first point for decentralisation under popular supervision below the state level.
3. Zila Parishad should be the executive body and made responsible for planning at the district level.
4. There should be an official participation of political parties at all levels of Panchayat elections.
5. The Panchayat Raj institutions should have compulsory powers of taxation to mobilise their own financial resources.
6. There should be a regular social audit by a district level agency and by a committee of legislators to check whether the funds allotted for the vulnerable social and economic groups are actually spent on them.
7. The state government should not supersede the Panchayat Raj institutions. In case of an imperative supersession, election should be held within 6 months from the date of supersession.
8. The Nyaya Panchayats should be kept as separate bodies from that of development panchayats. They should be presided over by a qualified judge.
9. The chief electoral officer of a state in consultation with the Chief Election Commissioner should organise and conduct the Panchayati Raj elections.
10. Development functions should be transferred to the Zila Parishad and all development staff should work under its control and supervision.
11. The voluntary agencies should play an important role in mobilising the support of the people for Panchayati Raj.
12. A minister for Panchayati Raj should be appointed in the state council of ministers to look after the affairs of the Panchayati Raj institutions.
13. Seats for SCs and Sts should be reserved on the basis of their population.1/3rd seats should be reserved for women.

1. A Constitutional recognition should be accorded to the Panchayati Raj institutions. This would give them the requisite status and an assurance of continuous functioning.
