= Yusuf Meherally =

20th-century Indian independence activist and socialist political leader

Mayor of Bombay
- In office 1942–1943
- Preceded by: Joseph A. Collaco
- Succeeded by: M. D. D. Gilder

Personal details
- Born: Yusuf Meherally Merchant; 23 September 1903 Bombay, Bombay Presidency, British India
- Died: 2 July 1950 (aged 47)
- Party: Congress Socialist Party
- Other political affiliations: Indian National Congress
- Education: Elphinstone College; Government Law College, Bombay

Yusuf Meherally Merchant (23 September 1903 – 2 July 1950) was an Indian independence activist and socialist leader. He was elected Mayor of Bombay in 1942 to 1943 while he was imprisoned in Yerawada Central Prison.

He was the founder of the National Militia, Bombay Youth League and the Congress Socialist Party and played a role in several peasant and trade union movements. He coined the term 'Simon Go Back'.

He was a part of the Quit India Movement along with Mahatma Gandhi for India's last nationwide campaign for independence from the British Empire. He was a participant of underground movement and was in forefront of Quit India Movement. He coined the term "Quit India" which found the approval of Mahatma Gandhi. In his book Gandhi and Bombay, K. Gopalaswami describes how "Quit India" came to be adopted as the slogan amidst other contenders. Shantikumar Morarji noted that during a meeting in Bombay, Gandhi and his colleagues discussed slogans for independence. Suggestions like "Get out" and "Retreat" were rejected by Gandhi as they sounded impolite. Finally, Yusuf Meherally proposed "Quit India," for which Gandhi said in approval, "Amen."

== Early life ==
Yusuf Meherally, born on 23 September 1903 in Bombay, came from a prosperous family with a history in textile mills. Influenced by revolutionary movements and the struggles of the working class in different nations and the role of youth in the same, he became a strong supporter of the freedom struggle, despite his pro-British family's disapproval. After finishing high school at Bharda High School he became an independence activist. After earning a degree in History and Economics from Elphinstone College, he was studying law at Government Law College in 1928 when the Simon Commission, lacking any Indian members, arrived in Bombay, causing widespread discontent among Indians. Due to his political views, he was denied a licence to practice law.

== Political career ==
In 1928, Meherally founded the Bombay Youth League and organized a protest against the Simon Commission, famously shouting "Simon Go Back" at the Bombay port. He and other young men were dressed as coolies to get access to the port. His courage gained widespread recognition, including from Mahatma Gandhi, leading the British to debar him from practicing law. In 1938, he led the Indian delegation to the World Youth Congress in New York and attended the World Cultural Conference in Mexico. Noticing a lack of literature on contemporary Indian issues, he wrote the "Leaders of India" series, translating them into Gujarati, Hindi, and Urdu. On 14 July 1942, he coined the slogan "Quit India," which was approved by Gandhi at Wardha. Yusuf Meherally mobilized his socialist colleagues, including Rammanohar Lohia, Aruna Asaf Ali, and Achyut Patwardhan, to continue the Quit India movement while underground after Congress leaders were arrested. He was arrested with Gandhi on August 9, 1942. Released in 1946, he became an MLA in Independent India and founded the Congress Socialist Party.

== Death ==
Meherally was admitted to the hospital for treatment of heart trouble, which he got after his detention during the Quit India movement in 1942. On 2 July 1950, Yusuf Meherally died at the age of 47 years. Bombay mourned his death with great emotions.

== List of works ==
1. What to Read: A Study Syllabus (1937)
2. Leaders of India (1942)
3. A Trip to Pakistan (1944)
4. The Modern World: A Political Study Syllabus, Part 1 (1945)
5. The Price of Liberty (1948)
6. Underground Movement(1942)
