= Simaria =

Village in Bihar state in India

Simaria सिमरिया
- Village
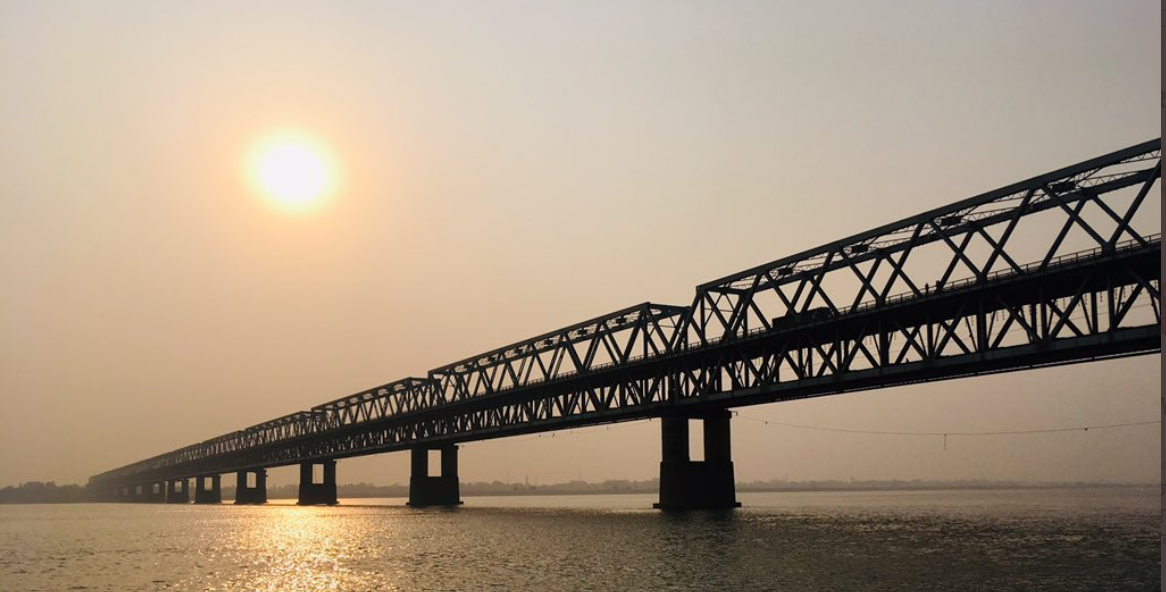
- The Rajendra Setu bridge
- Interactive map of Simaria
- Coordinates: 25°22′52.022″N 86°0′36.114″E
- Country: India
- State: Bihar
- District: Begusarai
- Region: Mithila

Government
  - Type: City Council
  - Body: Bihat Nagar Parishad
- PIN: 851126

Simaria is an Indian village on the Ganges river. It is in the Begusarai District and near BTPS, Barauni. It is also called Kumbhasthali, Amritbhumi, Welcome Gate of Mithila, and known as the birthplace of the Hindi poet Ramdhari Singh Dinkar.
