= Lok Nayak Jai Prakash Narayan Central Jail =

Prison in Jharkhand, India

Coordinates: 24.0188°N 85.3594°E

Lok Nayak Jai Prakash Narayan Central Jail is a prison located in Hazaribagh, Jharkhand, India. The 100-acre facility has a five-layer security wall.

Chandrashekhar Suman is the Jail Superintendent in December 2025.

== History ==
Established in 1832, it is one of the oldest jails in India. Freedom fighter Lok Nayak Jai Prakash Narayan was imprisoned in this jail during the Bharat Chhoddo Andolan in 1942. Khan Abdul Gaffar Khan was also imprisoned here. Marxist Leninist revolutionary Charu Mazumdar was an inmate in 1973-74 and a jail break attempt by him was foiled by the authorities at that time. The ward which housed Lok Nayak and the cell where he died was converted into an heritage building.

On 9 November 1942, Jai Prakash Narayan, along with five other inmates, escaped from this jail with the help of 56 dhotis to jump off the 17-feet high jail wall.

== Facilities ==
The jail also houses a facility for juvenile correction home. On 27 December 2025, Justice Sujit Narayan Prasad of the Jharkhand high court visited the jail to inspect the facilities. The central jail has a library, medical and counselling rooms, meeting facilities, and a layered security system.
