= Mirza Ghalib College =

College in Bihar, India

Coordinates: 24.7912°N 84.9928°E

- मिर्जा गालिब कॉलेज (Hindi) مرزا غالب کالج (Urdu)
- Motto: Spread Education to Minority and All
- Type: College
- Established: 1969; 57 years ago
- Academic affiliations: UGC; NAAC; Magadh University
- Principal: Dr. Ali Hussain
- Location: White House Compound, Gaya, Bihar, India
- Campus: Urban
- Colours: Red & white
- Website: mirzaghalibcollegegaya.ac.in

Mirza Ghalib College (MGC) (Hindi: मिर्जा गालिब कॉलेज, Urdu: مرزا غالب کالج) is a government-aided minority college in Gaya, Bihar, India offering courses in various subjects up to post graduation (in arts, science, commerce). It was established in year 1969 and is affiliated to Magadh University, Bodh Gaya.

== History ==
Efforts of philanthropists Khan Bahadur Abdul Hafeez (Founder President) and Abdus Salam (Founder Secretary), Mirza Ghalib College, Gaya, a Government Aided Muslim Minority P.G. Unit of Magadh University, Bodh-Gaya, Bihar, came into existence in 1969, centenary year of Mirza Asadullah Begh Khan Ghalib, a great Urdu poet. Khan Bahadur Abdul Hafeez was a retired Deputy Commissioner of Excise of North Bihar under the British government. He received his title of Khan Bahadur from the British Government for his work and report of the toddy survey of Bihar.

Ever since its establishment, the college has been imparting education in the faculties of Science, Arts and Commerce up to the graduation level. The State Government has granted permanent affiliation in Science, Arts & Commerce up to Degree level. The college also provides Post Graduation education in Botany, Chemistry, Zoology and Psychology. This UGC-enlisted college also offers vocational courses in Computer Application, Management and Interdisciplinary Biotechnology (B.C.A., B.B.M. & Bachelor of Biotechnology Hons.). It has the distinction of being the first college in the Magadh division of Bihar to start Biotechnology course in 2005. Some major departments of this college have provision of seminar library. This college has separate arrangement for the education of girl students in the morning shift.

== Departments ==
- English
- Hindi
- Persian
- Urdu
- Botany
- Chemistry
- Mathematics
- Physics
- Zoology
- Ancient history
- Economics
- Geography
- History
- Philosophy
- Political science
- Psychology
- Sociology
- BBM
- BCA
- Bio-Technology

== Facilities ==
- Indoor Games
- Common Rooms for Teachers
- Hostels
- sports facility
- canteen for Students
- library
