= Harinagar, Uttar Pradesh =

Coordinates: 26.5000°N 87.1167°E

Harinagara is a Rural Municipality and the village of Sunsari district in Koshi State Of Nepal

== Location ==
Harinagar is 5 km east of the GT Road NH 58 Purkazi after crossing Upper Ganga Canal Expressway. Its other nearby localities are Randavali, Suwaheri, Godhana, Tuglakpur-Kamhera, Jhabarpur, Samasnagar, Sherpur Khadar, Badhiwala and Khanpur block of Uttarakhand state. The other important and famous places near this village are Shukrataal, Roorkee, Laksar, Haridwar, Rishikesh. It is covered by Police Station Purkazi, Pargana Pur Chhapar, Tehsil Muzaffarnagar. It is situated on a state highway Purkazi-Laksar Road a by pass to Haridwar, and is 24 km from Roorkee railway station. To the East flows the river Solani.

== Demographics ==
At the time of the 2011 Indian census, Harinagar had a population of 3850 people living in 877 individual households. The literacy rate of the village is above 70%. Many people work in government jobs like banking, UP police, and teaching. The people belong to the Hindu and Muslim religions. The main language spoken is Hindi.

== Economy ==
This is a main zone for production of sugar cane and Jaggery (गुड़), known as raab in Western UP. It is a very rich region to grow sugar cane, wheat, rice and pulses, and many types of vegetables and fruits like mango, guava, pear, and plum. The main occupation of the people is agriculture and livestock farming. Many fairs and festivals are celebrated in this village.

There are many Reserve Forests which increase its beauty and provide fresh air, and shelter to wild animals. Its whole area is well irrigated by canal Gang Nahar and tube wells. There are many pataltod wells (पाताल तोड़ कुआं) in Khadar region.

== Public institutions ==
There is a junior high school in the village. Colleges in the vicinity include Jai Bharat Inter College at Chhapar, and Barla Inter College.
