= Prabhavati Devi =

Indian independence activist (1904–1973)

Prabhavati Devi Narayan
- Born: Prabhavati Devi Prasad; 1904; Srinagar, Saran district, Bengal Presidency, British India (present-day Siwan district, Bihar, India)
- Died: 15 April 1973 (aged 68–69); Patna, Bihar, India
- Spouse: Jayaprakash Narayan
- Parents: Brajkishore Prasad (father); Phool Devi Prasad (mother)

Prabhavati Devi Narayan (née Prasad; 1904 – 15 April 1973) was an Indian independence activist from the present-day state of Bihar, and wife of compatriot independence and social activist, Jayaprakash Narayan.

== Early life and family ==
She was born to prominent lawyer, Brajkishore Prasad and Phool Devi in Srinagar in the present-day district of Siwan in Bihar. Brajkishore Prasad was himself an ardent Gandhian, perhaps the first Congress party member in Bihar, who had given up a lucrative legal practice to devote himself to the freedom struggle. She was married to Jayprakash Narayan when she was 16 in October 1920.

After their marriage, Jayaprakash Narayan went to the USA to initially study science in California but instead enrolled at University of Wisconsin to study Marxism. She moved to Gandhi's ashram where she devoted herself completely to Gandhi's wife, Kasturba Gandhi who started regarding Prabhavati as her daughter.

When her husband returned, he was regarded a revolutionary and this led to several differences with her because of her Gandhian orientation. She had also asked to take a vow by Mahatma Gandhi to be a celibate. Being a close associate of Mahatma Gandhi, Prabhavati was one of the women to take part in his controversial celibacy tests. Nevertheless, the couple respected each other and jointly decided not to have any children until the country was free from foreign yoke. She was jailed by the British colonial authorities on several occasions.

== Friendship with the Nehru family ==
Prabhavati developed a very close relationship with Jawaharlal Nehru's wife, Kamala Nehru and became her confidante. Kamala wrote several personal letters to her. Most of the letters were returned to Kamala's daughter, Indira Gandhi by Narayan following Prabha's death. One hangs on the wall of the home in the Kadam Kuan locality of Patna where Narayan and his wife both spent their last years. This was a handwritten letter by Nehru to Prabhavati during 1958 in Hindustani. The content of the letter summarizes as "Prabhavati had wished to start a school for girls and name it for Kamala Nehru. She had written to Jawaharlal asking whether he would inaugurate it. Nehru, in reply, said that he was delighted that this school was being planned, for he had long been an advocate of education for girls. But, he added, he had taken a vow that in the case of any school, project, or programme started in memory of his father (Motilal Nehru) or his wife, he would not participate in its inauguration. He asked Prabhavati to go ahead and start the school, with another chief guest if required. He added by way of consolation that when the place was up and running, he would come visit it anyway".

== Life after Indian independence ==
It was under her influence that Jayaprakash joined the Sarvodaya movement and actively participated in peace overtures in the Northeast India and the Middle East. She established Mahila Charkha Samiti in Patna to involve deserted and abandoned women in the charkha or the spinning wheel movement on the Gandhian model.

== Later life and death ==
The last few years were especially painful for Prabha after she was discovered to be suffering from advanced cancer. She died on 15 April 1973.
