= Harinagar, Mayabunder =

Coordinates: 12°40′30″N 92°52′59″E

Harinagar is a panchayat village located in the Mayabunder block of South Andaman district, Andaman and Nicobar Islands in India. In 2008–09, its population was 1809.
