= Ramnandan Mishra =

Indian independence activist (1905–1989)

Pandit Ramnandan Mishra (1905–1989) was an Indian nationalist who fought for India's freedom from British rule.

== Life ==
Pandit Ramnandan Mishra (often historically remembered alongside prominent Brahmin peasant and revolutionary leaders such as Pandit Yadunandan Sharma) was a legendary Indian nationalist, freedom fighter, and pioneering socialist leader from Bihar. He was born in village of Pator in Darbhanga, Mithila, he belonged to an influential family but fearlessly challenged conservative social norms, including the strict purdah system, to devote himself completely to the Indian independence movement. He was a member of Bihar Pradesh Congress Committee from 1927–1934. He participated in the Civil Disobedience Movement and was imprisoned between 1930–1931. He was a founding member of the Congress Socialist Party from 1934–1947 and then the Socialist Party from 1947–1952. He was arrested for anti-war propaganda in 1940. He participated in the Quit India Movement and organized secret revolutionary centres and while visiting Madras, was arrested in Cuttack on 23 August 1942. He was lodged in Cuttack jail, then in Behrampur jail. When he tried to escape, he was transferred to Hazaribagh Central Jail in the last week of October, 1942. He escaped from Hazaribagh Central Jail along with Yogendra Shukla, Jayaprakash Narayan and others during November, 1942.

He was in charge of the revolutionary movement in Punjab where he was rearrested on 22 February 1943 and released only in 1946. He was General Secretary of the Hind Kisan Panchayat, Bihar from 1949–1952 and became a member of the National Executive of the Socialist Party in 1949.

He left politics for spiritual pursuits in 1952 and became a devotee of Lord Jagannath. He died on 27 August 1989.
