= Rambriksh Benipuri =

Indian Writer (1899–1968)

Ramavriksha Benipuri
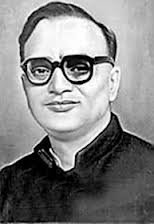
- Born: 23 December 1899; Benipur Village, Muzaffarpur, India
- Died: 9 September 1968 (aged 68); Muzaffarpur, India
- Occupations: Freedom fighter; socialist leader; editor; writer; dramatist; essayist; novelist; politician
- Children: Dr. Prabha Benipuri
- Relatives: Shyam Sunder Das
- Writing career
- Notable works: Ambpali, Patiton Ke Desh Mein, Genhu Aur Gulab, Maati Ki Muratien, Zanjeerein Aur Deewarien, Vijeta, Shakuntala etc.
- Notable awards: Lifetime Achievement Award For Contribution In Literature From Rashtra Bhasha Parishad
- Movements: Kisan Mahasabha, Quit India Movement, Janaue Todo Abhiyaan

Ramavriksha Benipuri (23 December 1899 – 9 September 1968) was an independence activist, socialist leader, editor and Hindi writer. He was born in a small village named Benipur in Muzaffarpur district in a Bhumihar family in the Indian state of Bihar. He spent nine years in prison for fighting for India's independence.

== Work ==
He was the founder of Bihar Socialist Party in 1931 and the socialist wing Congress Socialist Party of the Indian National Congress, in 1934. He served as the president of Patna District Congress Committee of Indian National Congress from 1935 to 1937 during the 1937 Indian provincial elections. He was elected as the Member of the Legislative Assembly (India) from Katra North in 1957. In 1958, he was elected as the Syndicate Member of Bihar University (Now Babasaheb Bhimrao Ambedkar Bihar University), Muzaffarpur.

Ramvriksha Benipuri hailed from Muzaffarpur in Bihar and took active part in the Indian freedom movement. He was also a journalist of Hindi Literature and started several newspapers like Yuvak in 1929 and regularly contributed in various others to spread the idea of nationalism and freedom from British rule.

== Writing career ==
Benipuriji's first writing was published in Pratapa of Kanpur in 1916. Since then, till the attainment of Independence of India, his was a life of political activities and struggle. In 1928–29, Benipuri established Yuvaka-Ashram in front of Patna College in Patna with his friends and lifelong colleagues Ganga Sharan Singh and Pandit Ramnandan Mishra. In 1929, Benipuri started the publication of Yuvaka, a Hindi monthly from this organization, under his editorship.

Benipuri started his literary career in 1921 with a weekly Hindi journal Tarun Bharat of which he was an associate editor. He also worked as an associate editor of the Kisan Mitra weekly in 1922, Golmal in 1924 and as an editor of the monthly journal Balak in 1926, but the publication of Yuvak made him more popular.

=== Yuvak Hindi Journal ===
Yuvak, an illustrated Hindi monthly magazine, was launched in January 1929 by Rambriksh Benipuri, a distinguished Hindi writer, critic, poet, journalist and freedom fighter. He was assisted by Ganga Sharan Singh (Sinha), Ambica Kant Sinha and Jagdish Narayan in its publication. Devoted to 'strength, courage and culture', Yuvak was edited, printed and published by Rambriksh Benipuri from the Patna Yuvak Ashram. It was printed at the Searchlight Press. Yuvak was the official organ of the Patna Yuvak Sangh founded in 1927 by Manindra Narayan Roy, a journalist of The Searchlight.

Yuvak made Benipuri an eyesore of the colonial British government as its mission was to secure Swaraj for India promoting armed revolution and overthrowing the British regime. Its writings had a clear impact of Marxism as its contributors were political elites, avowed nationalists and Marxist revolutionaries.

=== As a Playwright ===
Ramvriksha Benipuri stands in a class apart as a playwright. He wrote Ambapalai during his detention in the Hazaribagh Central Jail. Later on he wrote a series of one-act plays and radio-dramas, more notable being: the Netra-dan, Tathagat, Sanghamitra, Singhal Vijay and Vijeta. Benipuri had a forceful pen and was a prolific writer. Main attraction of Benipuri's plays lies in his way of writing. There is a delightful mixture of romanticism and idealism in his plays.

=== Short stories ===
In most of Ramvriksha Benipuri's short stories pictures of rural life of north Bihar, specially that of Muzaffarpur district have been vividly presented. His Mati ki Mooraten, though not a story book in strict sense of the term, actually presents persons of flesh and blood, each throbbing with life, on a rural canvas.

=== Style and influence ===
Benipuri wrote mostly big stories and essays. His dramas covered mostly ancient events. For example, Amipure depicts the life of the famous courtesan Ambipure who adopted and converted to Buddhism after meeting Buddha. Likewise Netradaan (that is, Gift of Eyes), another drama, is based on a historical legend involving Ashoka and his son Kunal.

He was also a distinguished playwright.

A stanza from one of his famous poems, "Shahido – tumhari yaad me" goes like this:

"Hey, the Martyrs of August Revolution,

We shall forever keep the flag high

For which thy hath given the lives;

We shall always esteem the path of martyrdom

Sanctified by the blood of the supreme sacrifice."

The eminent Hindi writer, poet, play-wright, journalist and nationalist Rambriksh Benipuri, who spent more than eight years in prison fighting for India's independence writes of Non-co-operation movement as:

When I recall Non-Cooperation era of 1921, the image of a storm confronts my eyes. From the time I became aware, I have witnessed numerous movements, however, I can assert that no other movement upturned the foundations of Indian society to the extent that the Non-Cooperation movement did. from the most humble huts to the high places, from villages to cities, everywhere there was a ferment, a loud echo.

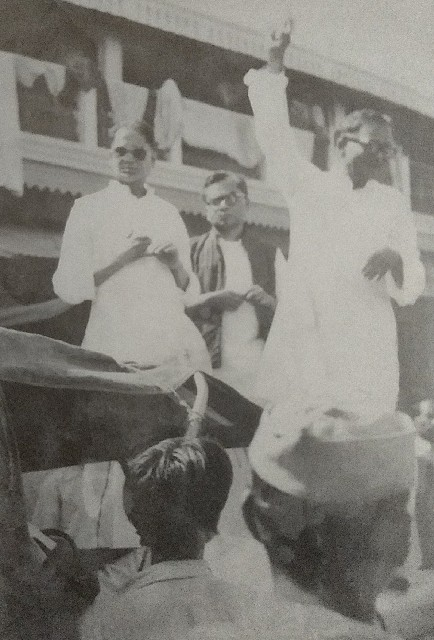
Benipuri (right) at Kisan Sabha CSP Patna rally, August 1936

== In the freedom movement ==
Benipuri was a close associate of Jayaprakash Narayan and a leading light of the Congress Socialist Party. He took active part in the agitation against the Rowlatt Act and participated in the Non-cooperation movement launched by Mahatma Gandhi in 1920. He was an active member of the Bihar Pradesh Congress Committee, a member of the Indian National Congress, one of the founder members of the Bihar Socialist Party and a member of the working committee of the All India Congress Socialist Party. He had also been the President of the Bihar Provincial Kisan Sabha and the Vice-President of the All India Kisan Sabha. At the 50th session of the All India Congress Committee held at Faizpur in 1937 he moved a resolution on the abolition of Zamindari. Again, it was Benipuri who helped Jayaprakash Narayan escape from the Hazaribagh Central Jail along with Jogendra Shukul, Suraj Narayan Singh, Gulali Sonar, Pandit Ramnandan Mishra, and Shaligram Singh on 9 November 1942 keeping the prisoners engaged in Diwali Celebration.

== Homage ==
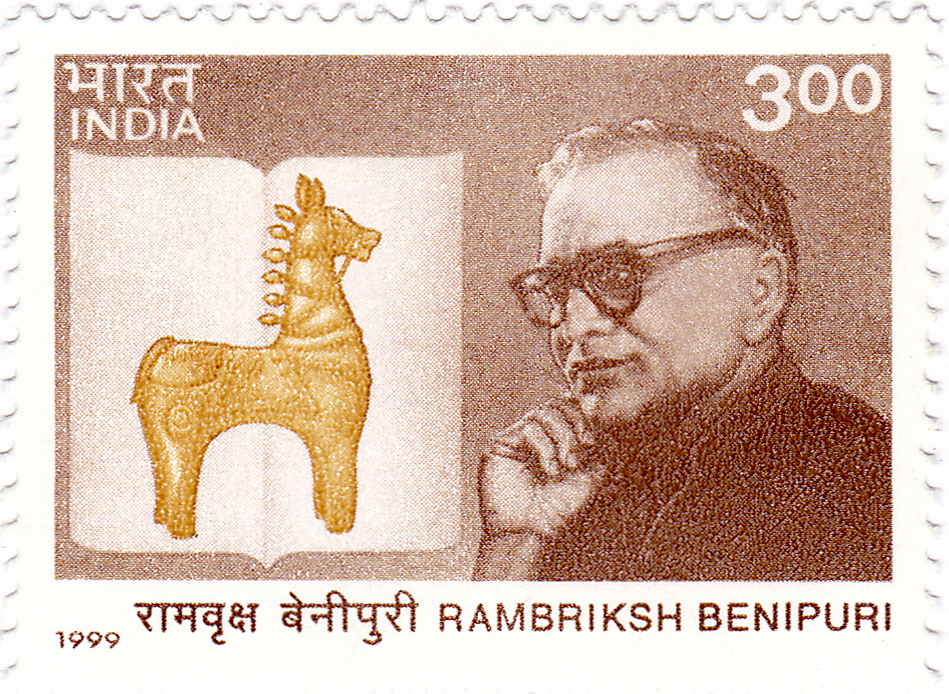
Benipuri on a 1999 stamp of India

In 1999, Benipuri was one of the Hindi writers depicted in a set of commemorative postal stamps released to celebrate the "Linguistic Harmony of India," marking the 50th anniversary since India adopted Hindi as its official language.

== Centenary celebrations ==
The chief guest on the occasion of the birth centenary of Benipuri held in zonal railway training centre at Muzaffarpur, held under the auspices of railway ministry, was the former Prime Minister of India Chandra Shekhar. The main speakers included litterateur Namwar Singh and journalist Prabhash Joshi. Namwar Singh described Benipuri as only the second litterateur who preferred to associate his name with that of his village.

Prabhash Joshi ranked Benipuri with Makhanlal Chaturvedi and Ganesh Shankar Vidyarthi, who were both contemporary writers and journalists as well. He said '"Benipuri was not like today's journalists who work only to earn. Benipuri had a desire to create a "samtawadi samaj" and fight against imperialism."

== Major literary works ==
=== Memoirs and essays ===
- Patiton Ke Desh Mein-1930-33
- Chita Ke Phool-1930-32
- Lal Taaraa-1937-39

Lal Tara is the symbol of a new light of the morning. The light is very near and therefore the darkness has increased. The writer wants to say that the darkness would disappear within a short time and a new rising light would come out. There are 16 such sketches in the collection. Benipuri tries to search out a new society, a new way of living and a new culture.

- Kaidee Ki Patni-1940
- Maate

-1941-45

- Gehun Aur Gulaab- 1948–50

It was published in 1950. This composition also brought much laurels and fame to Benipuri and was welcomed in the Hindi world like the former two titles, "Lal Tara" and "Mati ki Murten".

- Zanjeeren Aur Deewaren
- Udate Chalo, Udate Chalo

=== Dramas ===
- Ambpali-1941-46
- Sita Ki maan-1948-50
- Sanghamitra-1948-50
- Amar Jyoti-1951
- Tathaagat
- Singhal Vijay
- Shakuntala
- Ramrajya
- Netradaan-1948-50
- Gaao Ke Devata
- Nayaa samaaj
- Vijeta-1953.
- Baiju Mama, National Book Trust, 1994

=== Editing and critical ===
- Vidyapati Ki Padaavali
- Bihari (poet) satsai Ki Subodh Teekaa

=== Biography ===
- Jayaprakash Narayan only with the initials Jayaprakash

=== Lalit Gadya ===
- Vande Vaani Vinayaka −1953-54.

=== Collected works ===
- Collected Works of Rambriksh Benipuri, 8 volumes, Radhakrishna Prakashan

=== Selected works/anthology ===
- Rambriksh Benipuri Rachna Sanchayan, Sahitya Akademi

== Works on Rambriksha Benipuri ==
- Gajanan Pandurang Chavan, Ramvriksha aur unka sahitya, 1984.
- Dr. Prabha Benipuri, Benipuriji ke natakon me samajik chetna, 1989.
- Ram Bachan Rai, Ramvriksh Benipuri, Sahitya Akademi, 1995, ISBN 81-7201-974-2.
- Raśmi Caturvedī, Rāmavr̥ksha Benīpurī ke rekhācitra, eka adhyayana, Sāhitya Nilaya, 2005.
- Indu Prakash Pandey, Hindi Literature: Trends & Traits, Firma K. L. Mukhopadhyay, 1975.

== See also ==
- List of Indian writers
