= Jayaprakash Narayan =

Indian independence activist (1902–1979)

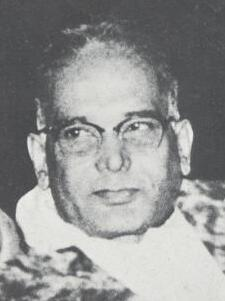
- Born: Jayaprakash Narayan Srivastava; 11 October 1902; Sitab Diara, Chhapra district, Bengal Presidency, British India (now in Ballia district, Uttar Pradesh, India)
- Died: 8 October 1979 (aged 76); Patna, Bihar, India
- Other names: JP, Jay Prakash Narayan, Lok Nayak
- Education: University of Wisconsin (M.A., sociology); Ohio State University (B. A., behavioural science); University of Iowa (CHE, discontinued); U.C. Berkeley (chemistry, discontinued)
- Occupations: Activist; theorist; politician
- Political party: Indian National Congress; Janata Party
- Other political affiliations: Congress Socialist Party
- Movement: Quit India, Sarvodaya, JP Movement, Bihar Movement
- Spouse: Prabhavati Devi
- Relatives: Brajkishore Prasad (father-in-law)
- Awards: Ramon Magsaysay Award (1965); Bharat Ratna (1999) (posthumously)

Jayaprakash Narayan Srivastava (11 October 1902 – 8 October 1979), also known as JP and Lok Nayak (Hindi for "People's leader"), was an Indian politician, theorist and independence activist. He is mainly remembered for leading the mid-1970s opposition against Prime Minister Indira Gandhi and calling for her overthrow in a "total revolution". In 1999, Narayan was posthumously awarded the Bharat Ratna, India's highest civilian award, in recognition of his social service. His other awards include the Ramon Magsaysay Award for public service in 1965.

== Early life ==
Jayaprakash Narayan Srivastava was born on 11 October 1902 in the village of Sitab Diara, Chhapra district, Bengal Presidency, British India (present-day Ballia district, Uttar Pradesh, India). (Note: Sitabdiara is a large village straddling two states and three districts—Saran and Bhojpur in Bihar, and Ballia in Uttar Pradesh.) His house was near the banks of the flood-prone Ghaghara river; every time the river swelled, the house would be slightly damaged, eventually forcing the family to move a few kilometres away to a settlement that is now known as Jayaprakash Nagar, Uttar Pradesh.

Narayan came from a Kayastha family of Srivastava clan. He was the fourth child of Harsu Dayal and Phul Rani Devi. His father was a junior official in the canal department of the state government and often toured the region. When Narayan was nine years old, he left his village to enroll in the seventh class of the collegiate school at Patna. This was his first break from village life. Narayan stayed at Saraswati Bhawan, a student hostel where most of the boys were older than him and included some of Bihar's future leaders, such as its first chief minister, Krishna Singh, his deputy Anugrah Narayan Sinha and several others who became politicians and academics.

In October 1920, Narayan married independence activist Prabhavati Devi. After their wedding, because Narayan was working in Patna and it was difficult for his wife to stay with him, Mahatma Gandhi invited Prabhavati to become an inmate at Sabarmati Ashram (Ahmedabad). Jayaprakash, along with some friends, went to listen to Maulana Abul Kalam Azad speak about Gandhi's non-cooperation movement against the passing of the Rowlatt Act of 1919. Azad was a brilliant orator and his call to give up English education was "like leaves before a storm: Jayaprakash has swept away and momentarily lifted up to the skies. That brief experience of soaring up with the winds of a great idea left imprints on his inner being". Inspired by Azad's words, Jayaprakash left Bihar National College with just 20 days remaining to his examinations. Jayaprakash joined the Bihar Vidyapeeth, a college founded by Rajendra Prasad, and became among the first students of Gandhian Anugraha Narayan Sinha.

== Higher education in the United States ==
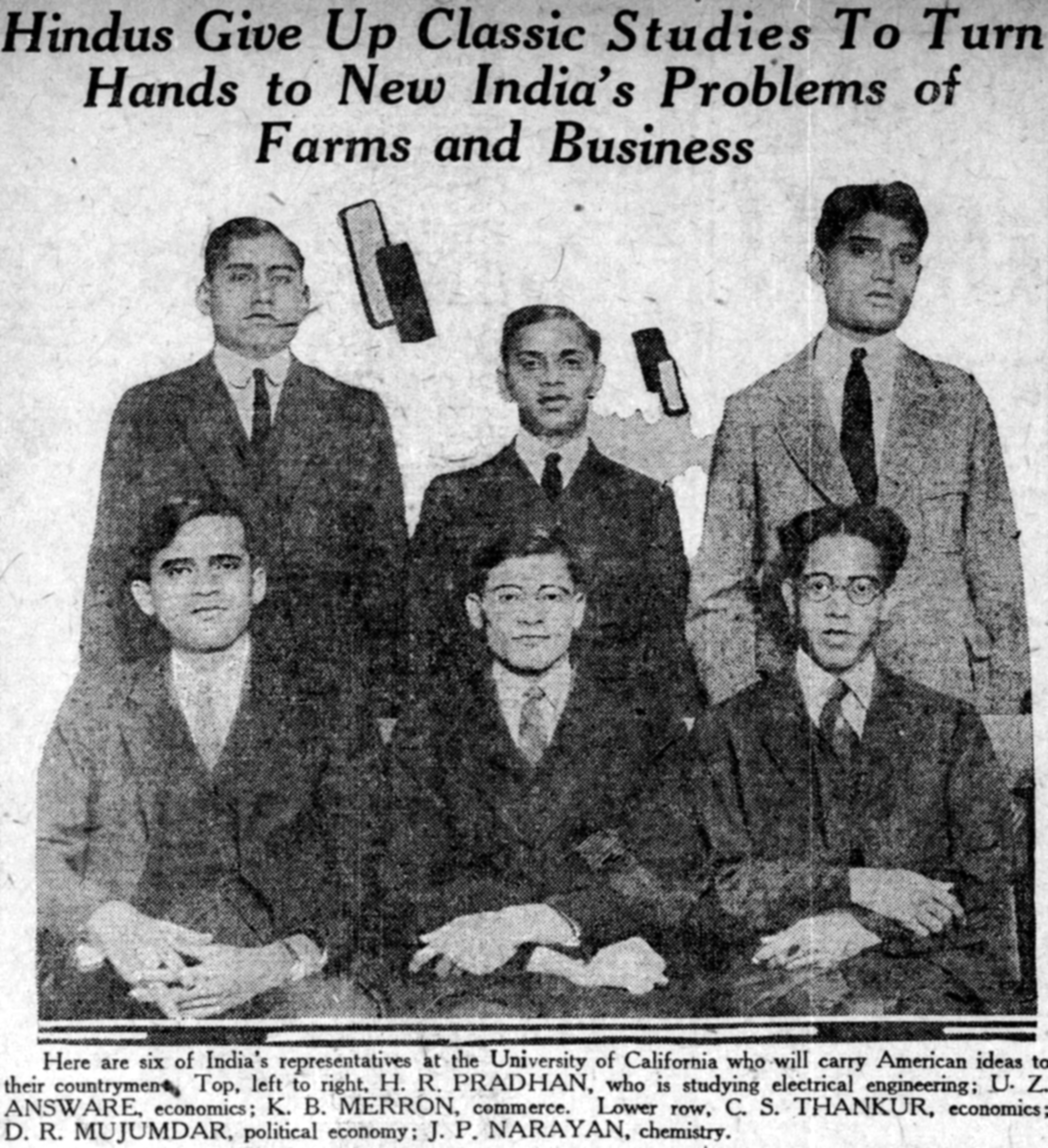
Narayan (top row, right) in The Oakland Post Enquirer, April 17, 1923

After exhausting the courses at the Vidyapeeth, Narayan decided to continue his studies in the United States. At age 20, Jayaprakash sailed aboard the cargo ship Janus while Prabhavati remained at Sabarmati. Jayaprakash reached California on 8 October 1922, and was admitted to the University of California, Berkeley (UC Berkeley) in January 1923 as a chemistry undergraduate. To pay for his education, Narayan picked grapes, packed fruits at a canning factory, washed dishes, and worked as a garage mechanic. These jobs gave Narayan an insight into the difficulties of the working class. While at Berkeley, Narayan, then one of 45 students from India, joined the university's Hindustan Club. At the end of the semester, however, his fees doubled and he was forced to transfer to The University of Iowa, where he continued his studies in applied science and his activities with the Hindustan Association of America, a national association of Indian students studying in the United States. Narayan chaired the association's 1923 national convention, which was held at the university at the end of December 1923.

In Wisconsin, Narayan was introduced to Karl Marx's book Das Kapital. News of the success of the Bolsheviks in the Russian Civil War made Narayan conclude Marxism was the way to alleviate the suffering of the masses. He studied books by Indian intellectuals and Communist theoreticians M. N. Roy. Narayan's paper on sociology Cultural Variation was declared the best of the year. Narayan graduated from University of Wisconsin with a MA in sociology, and from Ohio State University with a BA in behavioural science. While in the United States, he met K. B. Menon, then teaching at Harvard, ultimately persuading him to return to India and join the independence movement there.

== Politics ==
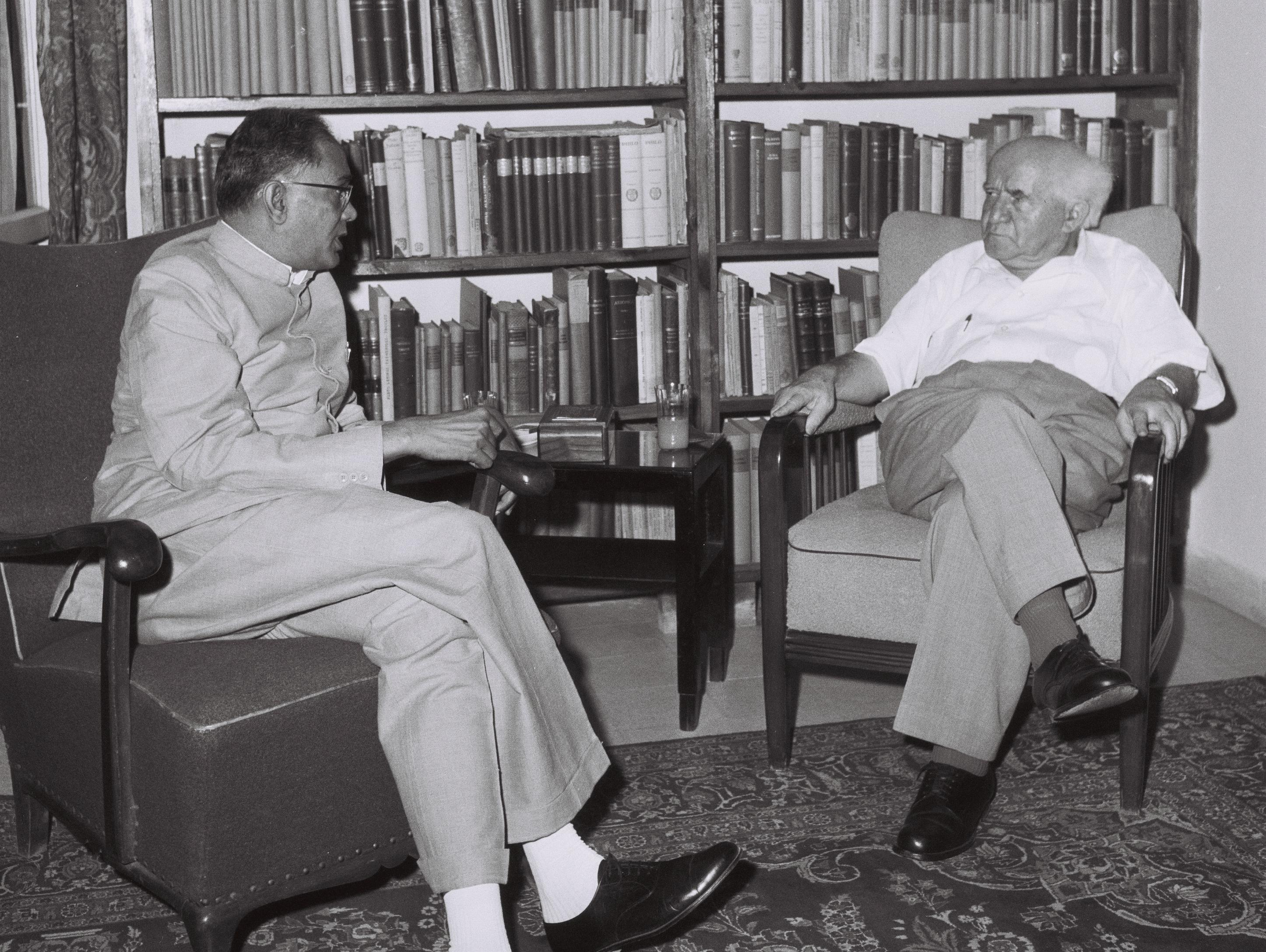
Narayan with Israeli prime minister David Ben-Gurion in Tel Aviv, 1958

Having become a Marxist, Narayan returned from the US to India in late 1929. The same year, he joined the Indian National Congress on the invitation of Jawaharlal Nehru; Mahatma Gandhi became Narayan's mentor in the Congress. Narayan shared a house at Kadam Kuan in Patna with his close friend and nationalist Ganga Sharan Singh (Sinha) with whom he shared a lasting friendship.

After being jailed in 1930 for civil disobedience against British rule, Narayan was imprisoned in Nashik Jail, where he met Ram Manohar Lohia, Minoo Masani, Achyut Patwardhan, Asoka Mehta, Basawon Singh, Yusuf Desai, C K Narayanaswami and other national leaders. After his release, the Congress Socialist Party (CSP), a left-wing group within the Congress, was formed with Narendra Deva as president and Narayan as general secretary.

When Mahatma Gandhi launched the Quit India Movement in August 1942, Narayan, along with Yogendra Shukla, Suraj Narayan Singh, Gulab Chand Gupta, Ramnandan Mishra, Shaligram Singh and Shyam Barthwar, scaled the wall of Lok Nayak Jai Prakash Narayan Central Jail, Hazaribagh with a goal of starting an underground movement for freedom. Many young socialist leaders like Ram Manohar Lohia, Chhotubhai Puranik and Aruna Asaf Ali took part in the movement. Because Narayan was ill, Yogendra Shukla walked to Gaya with Narayan on his shoulders, a distance of about 124 km (77 mi). Narayan also served as the chairman of Anugrah Smarak Nidhi (Anugrah Narayan Memorial Fund).

After the PRC's crackdown on the 1959 Tibetan uprising, in accordance with his Gandhian worldview, Narayan stated in 1959 that, "Tibet may be a theocratic state rather than a secular state and backward economically and socially, but no nation has the right to impose progress, whatever that may mean, upon another nation."

== After Independence ==
Between 1947 and 1953, Jayaprakash Narayan was President of All India Railwaymen's Federation, the largest labour union in Indian Railways.

== Emergency ==
In the year 1975, Allahabad High Court found Indira Gandhi guilty of violating electoral laws. Narayan called for Gandhi and the CMs to resign, and the military and police to disregard unconstitutional and immoral orders. He advocated a program of social transformation, which he termed Sampoorna kraanti (total revolution). Immediately afterwards, Gandhi proclaimed a national Emergency on the midnight of 25 June 1975. Desai, opposition leaders, and dissenting members of Gandhi's own party were arrested that day.

Jayaprakash Narayan gathered a crowd of 100,000 people at Ramlila grounds and recited Rashtrakavi Ramdhari Singh 'Dinkar''s poem Singhasan Khaali Karo Ke Janata Aaati Hai.

Narayan was detained at Chandigarh; he asked for one month of parole to mobilise relief in flooded parts of Bihar. His health suddenly deteriorated on 24 October 1975, and he was released on 12 November the same year. At Jaslok Hospital, Bombay, Narayan was diagnosed with kidney failure; he would be on kidney dialysis for the rest of his life.

In the UK, Surur Hoda launched "Free JP", a campaign for the release of Jayaprakash Narayan that was chaired by Nobel Peace Prize winner Philip Noel-Baker.

On 18 January 1977, Indira Gandhi revoked the emergency and announced elections. The Janata Party, a vehicle for the broad spectrum of the opposition to Gandhi, was formed under JP's guidance. The Janata Party was voted into power and became the first non-Congress party to form a central government. In the 1977 Indian presidential election, Narayan was proposed as President of India by Janata Party leaders but he refused and Neelam Sanjiva Reddy, then Speaker of the Lok Sabha, became president.

== Private life ==
At the age of 17, Jayaprakash was married to Prabhavati Devi, daughter of lawyer and nationalist Brij Kishore Prasad in October 1919. Prabhavati was very independent and on Gandhi's invitation, went to stay at his ashram while Jayaprakash continued his studies. Prabhavati Devi died on 15 April 1973 after a long battle with cancer.

== Death ==
In March 1979, while he was in the hospital, Narayan's death was erroneously announced by the Indian prime minister Morarji Desai, causing a wave of national mourning, including the suspension of parliament and regular radio broadcasting, and the closure of schools and shops. When he was told about the mistake a few weeks later, Narayan smiled. Narayan died in Patna, Bihar, on 8 October 1979, three days before his 77th birthday, due to the effects of diabetes and heart disease.

== Awards ==
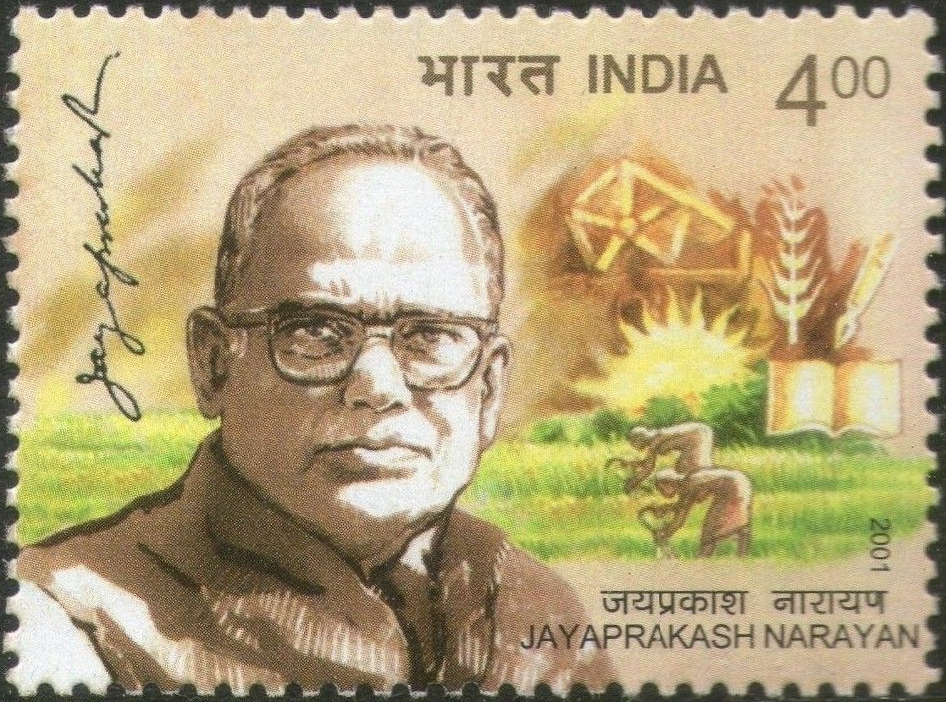
Narayan on a 2001 stamp of India

- Bharat Ratna, 1999 (Posthumous) for Public Affairs: It is India's highest civilian award.
- Rashtrabhushan Award of FIE Foundation, Ichalkaranji
- Ramon Magsaysay Award, 1965 for Public Service.

== Sites named after Jayaprakash Narayan ==
Jayaprakash Narayan's statue near Mirza Ghalib College in Gaya, Bihar, India

- Jay Prakash Narayan Airport in Patna
- On 1 August 2015, the Chhapra-Delhi-Chhapra Weekly Express was renamed as Loknayak Express in his honour.
- JP Setu the Digha-Sonpur Bridge, a rail-road bridge across river Ganga in Bihar
- Jayaprakash Nagar, Bengaluru (JP Nagar) a residential area in Bangalore.
- Jayaprakash Nagar, Mysore (JP Nagar) a residential area in Mysore.
- Lok Nayak Hospital (hospital in New Delhi)
- Lok Nayak Jayaprakash Narayan National Institute of Criminology & Forensic Science (college in New Delhi)
- JPN Centre of Excellence in Humanities (Indian Institute of Technology Simrol, Indore)
- Loknayak Jai Prakash Institute of Technology (Engineering college in Chhapra, Bihar).

== Artistic depictions of Jayaprakash Narayan ==
- Prakash Jha directed a 112-minute film "Loknayak", based on the life of Jayaprakash Narayan. Chetan Pandit played the role of JP in that film.
- Achyut Potdar played Narayan in ABP News show Pradhanmantri and Aaj Tak Aandolan.
- Anupam Kher portrayed Narayan in the 2025 film Emergency directed by Kangana Ranaut.

== See also ==
- Aklu Ram Mahto

== Further reading and bibliography ==
- Braja Kishore Prasad: The Hero of Many Battles by Sachidanand Sinha; National Book Trust, India, New Delhi; 2018; ISBN 978-81-237-8176-1
- Red Fugitive: Jayaprakash Narayan by H L Singh Dewans Publications Lahore 1946
- Life and Time of Jayaprakash Narayan by J S Bright Dewans Publications Lahore 1946
- J.P: His Biography, Allan and Wendy Scarfe, Orient Longmans New Delhi 1975
- Jayaprakash Narayan - Jankranti Ke Loknayak by Dr. Riteshwar Nath Tiwari, Rajmangal Prakashan, April 2023
- Jayaprakash: Rebel Extraordinary, by Lakshmi Narayan Lal, Indian Book Company New Delhi 1975
- Loknayak Jayaprakash Narayan, by Suresh Ram Macmillan Co. Delhi 1974
- Loknayak Jayaprakash Narayan by Farooq Argali Janata Pocket Books Delhi 1977.
- Bimal Prasad (editor). 1980. A Revolutionary's Quest: Selected Writings of Jayaprakash Narayan. Oxford University Press, Delhi ISBN 0-19-561204-3
- Jai Prakash Narain, Jayaprakash Narayan, Essential Writings, 1929–1979: A Centenary Volume, 1902–2002, Konark Publishers (2002) ISBN 81-220-0634-5
- Dr. Kawaljeet, J.P.'s Total Revolution and Humanism (Patna: Buddhiwadi Foundation, 2002). ISBN 81-86935-02-9
- Dr. Ramendra (editor), Jayaprakash Vichar Sankalan [Hindi] (Patna: Rajendra Prakashan, 1986).
- Satyabrata Rai Chowdhuri, Leftism in India: 1917–1947 (London and New Delhi: Palgrave Macmillan, 2008).
- Radhakanta Barik, Politics of the JP Movement (Radiant Publications, Delhi, 1977)
- MG Devashayam, JP Movement Emergency and India's Second Freedom (Vitasta Publishing Pvt. Ltd., New Delhi, 2012). ISBN 978-93-80828-61-9
- Why Socialism, 1936
- War Circulars, 1–4 CSP, Lucknow
- Inside Lahore Fort, Sahityalaya Patna 1947
- Nation Building in India – JP Narayan
- Three Basic Problems of India. From Socialism to Sarvodaya, Sarva Seva Sangh Prakashan, Varansi 1957
- A Plea for Reconstruction of Indian Polity, Sarva Seva Sangh Prakashan, Varanasi 1959
- Swaraj for the People, Sarva Seva Sangh Prakashan, Varansi 1961
- Sarvodaya Answer to Chinese Aggression, Sarvodaya Prachuralaya Tanjore 1963
- Face to Face, Navchetna Prakashan, Varansi 1970
- Prison Diary, Samajwadi Yuvjan Sabha Calcutta 1976 and Popular Prakashan, Bombay 1977.
- Towards Struggle, edited by Yusuf Meherally, Padma Publications, Bombay 1946, 47
- Socialism, Sarvodaya and Democracy edited by Bimal Prasad, Asia Publishing House Bombay 1964
- Communitarian Society and Panchayati Raj, edited by Brahmanand Navchetna Prakashan Varanasi 1970
- Nation-Building in India, edited by Brahmanand Navchetna Prakashan Varanasi 1974
- Towards Revolution, edited by Bhargava and Phadnis, Arnold-Heinemann New Delhi 1975
- J.P's Jail Life (A Collection of Personal Letters) translated by G S Bhargava, Arnold-Heinemann New Delhi 1977
- Towards Total Revolution, edited by Brahmanand Popular Prakashan Bombay 1978
- J P:Profile of a non-conformist, Interviews by Bhola Chatterji, Minerva Associates, Calcutta, 1979
- To All Fighters of Freedom II, A Revolutionary's Quest-selected writings of Jayprakash Narayan, edited by Bimal Prasad Oxford University Press New Delhi 1980
- Concept of Total Revolution: An Introductory Essay(JP and social change) by Bimal Prasad
