= Congress Socialist Party =

1934–1948 socialist caucus within the Indian National Congress

- Founder: Jayaprakash Narayan, Ram Manohar Lohia, Yusuf Meherally Merchant, Acharya Narendra Deva
- Founded: 1934
- Dissolved: 1948
- Political position: Left-wing

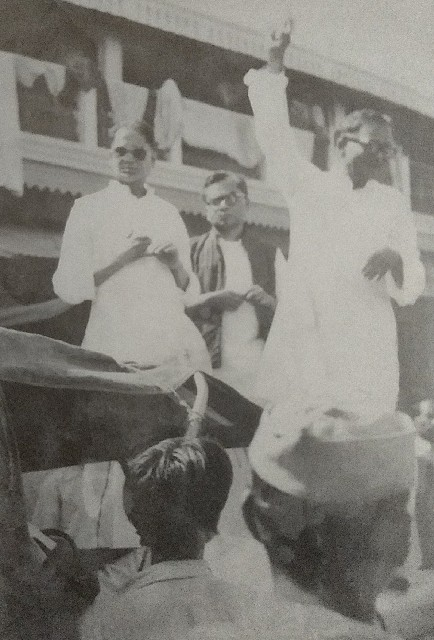
JP, Lohia & Benipuri at Kisan Sabha CSP Patna Rally, August 1936

The Congress Socialist Party (CSP) was a socialist caucus within the Indian National Congress. It was founded in 1934 by Congress members who rejected what they saw as the anti-rational mysticism of Gandhi as well as the sectarian attitude of the Communist Party of India towards the Congress. Influenced by Fabianism as well as Marxism-Leninism, the CSP included advocates of armed struggle or sabotage (such as Yusuf Meherally, Jayaprakash Narayan, and Basawon Singh (Sinha) as well as those who insisted upon Ahimsa or Nonviolent resistance (such as Acharya Narendra Deva). The CSP advocated decentralized socialism in which co-operatives, trade unions, independent farmers, and local authorities would hold a substantial share of the economic power.

As Marxists, they hoped to transcend communal divisions through class solidarity. Some, such as Narendra Deva or Basawon Singh (Sinha), advocated a democratic socialism distinct from both Marxism and reformist social democracy. During the Popular Front period, the communists worked within CSP.

== History ==
Jayaprakash Narayan and Minoo Masani were released from jail in 1934. Narayan convened a meeting in Patna on 17 May 1934, which founded the Bihar Congress Socialist Party. He was a Gandhian Socialist. Narayan became general secretary of the party and Acharya Narendra Deva became president. The Patna meeting gave a call for a socialist conference which would be held in connection to the Congress Annual Conference. At this conference, held in Bombay October 22–23 October 1934, they formed a new All India party, the Congress Socialist Party. Narayan became general secretary of the party, and Masani joint secretary. The conference venue was decorated by Congress flags and a portrait of Karl Marx.

In the new party the greeting 'comrade' was used as it was CSP. Masani mobilized the party in Bombay, whereas Kamaladevi Chattopadhyaya and Puroshottam Trikamdas organized the party in other parts of Maharashtra. Ganga Sharan Singh (Sinha) was among the prominent leaders of the Indian National Congress Party as among the founders of the Congress Socialist Party. The constitution of the CSP defined that the members of CSP were the members of the Provisional Congress Socialist Parties and that they were all required to be members of the Indian National Congress.

Members of communal organizations or political organizations whose goals were incompatible with the ones of CSP, were barred from CSP membership. The Bombay conference raised the slogan of mobilising the masses for a Constituent Assembly.

In 1936 the Communists joined CSP, as part of the Popular Front strategy of the ComIntern. In some states, like Kerala and Orissa, communists came to dominate CSP. In fact communists dominated the entire Congress in Kerala through its hold of CSP at one point.

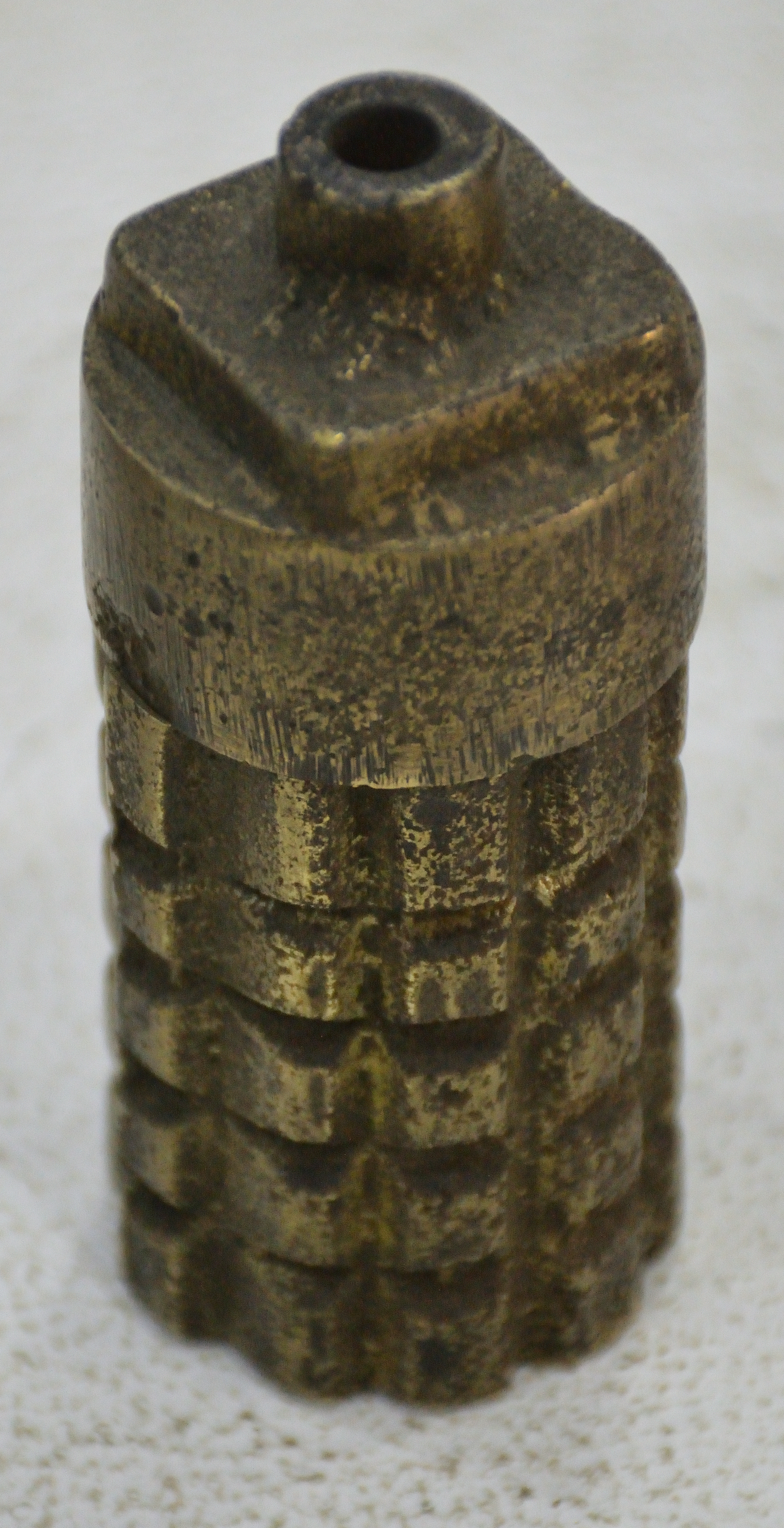
Congress Socialist Party possessed countrymade pipe bomb that recovered in 1943.

In 1936, the CSP began fraternal relations with the Lanka Sama Samaja Party of Ceylon. In 1937 the CSP sent Kamaladevi Chattopadhyaya on a speaking tour of the island.

The CSP had adopted Marxism in 1936 and their third conference in Faizpur they had formulated a thesis that directed the party to work to transform the Indian National Congress into an anti-imperialist front.

During the summer of 1938 a meeting took place between the Marxist sector of the Anushilan movement and the CSP. Present in the meeting were Jayaprakash Narayan (leader of CSP), Jogesh Chandra Chatterji, Tridib Kumar Chaudhuri and Keshav Prasad Sharma. The Anushilan marxists then held talks with Acharya Narendra Deva, a former Anushilan militant. The Anushilan marxists decided to join CSP, but keeping a separate identity within the party. With them came the Anushilan Samiti, not only the Marxist sector. The non-Marxists (who constituted about a half of the membership of the Samiti), although not ideologically attracted to the CSP, felt loyalty towards the Marxist sector. Moreover, around 25% of the membership of the Hindustan Socialist Republican Association joined the CSP. This group was led by Jogesh Chandra Chatterji. The Anushilan marxists were however soon to be disappointed by developments inside the CSP. The party, at that the time Anushilan marxists had joined it, was not a homogeneous entity. There was the Marxist trend led by Narayan and Deva, the Fabian socialist trend led by Minoo Masani and Asoka Mehta and a Gandhian socialist trend led by Ram Manohar Lohia, and Achyut Patwardan. To the Anushilan marxists differences emerged between the ideological stands of the party and its politics in practice. These differences surfaced at the 1939 annual session of the Indian National Congress at Tripuri. At Tripuri, in the eyes of the Anushlian marxists, the CSP had failed to consistently defend Subhas Chandra Bose. Jogesh Chandra Chatterji renounced his CSP membership in protest against the action by the party leadership.

Soon after the Tripuri session, Bose resigned as Congress president and formed the Forward Bloc. The Forward Bloc was intended to function as a unifying force for all leftwing elements. The Forward Bloc held its first conference on 22–23 June 1939, and at the same time a Left Consolidation Committee consisting of the Forward Bloc, CPI, CSP, the Kisan Sabha, League of Radical Congressmen, Labour Party and the Anushilan marxists. At this moment, in October 1939, J.P. Narayan tried to stretch out an olive branch to the Anushilan marxists. He proposed the formation of a 'War Council' consisting of himself, Pratul Ganguly, Jogesh Chandra Chatterjee and Acharya Narendra Deva. But few days later, at a session of the All India Congress Committee, J.P. Narayan and the other CSP leaders pledged not to start any other movements parallel to those initiated by Gandhi. The Left Consolidation Committee soon fell into pieces, as the CPI, the CSP and the Royists deserted it. The Anushlian marxists left the CSP soon thereafter, forming the Revolutionary Socialist Party.

Narayan organized the CSP relief work in Kutch in 1939.

On the occasion of the 1940 Ramgarh Congress Conference CPI released a declaration called Proletarian Path, which sought to utilize the weakened state of the British Empire in the time of war and gave a call for general strike, no-tax, no-rent policies and mobilising for an armed revolution uprising. The National Executive of the CSP assembled at Ramgarh took a decision that all communists were expelled from CSP.

Members of the CSP were particularly active in the Quit India movement of August 1942. Although a socialist, Jawaharlal Nehru did not join the CSP, which created some rancor among CSP members who saw Nehru as unwilling to put his socialist slogans into action. After independence, the CSP broke away from Congress, under the influence of JP, and Lohia to form the Socialist Party of India.

== See also ==
- Triveni Sangh
- Arjak Sangh
