= Harinagar, Bihar =

Village in Bihar, India

Harinagar is a small village in Bihar, India.

== Language ==
Maithili is primary spoken all over the village and no other language is being practiced. The officers, who are outside of the Maithili speaking territory, use Hindi as a connecting language. Maithili is recognized as an official language in India in the 8th Schedule of the Indian Constitution.

== Population ==
The population of the village is composed of various varna people. All four varna (i.e. Brahman, Kshatriya, Vaishya, and Shudra) are represented in the village, out of which the Brahmans are in the majority. According to the census of 2011, the total population of the village is 6,895.

== Demographics ==
The population of the village is also classified on the basis of caste, geographical position and other factors.

=== Local division ===
The village is divided into Lakshmipur (popularly - Puwari Tola), Jagir Tola, Rajua Tola, Dharisham Tola, Mallah tola, Chamartoli or Musahari (the place for lower caste people outside of the village), Kursham, etc. Dharisham also contains Paasi people.

=== Administration ===
Harinagar comes under Samastipur parliamentary constituency, and it comes under Kusheshwar West Assembly constituency. Both constituencies are kept reserved for Scheduled Caste and Scheduled Tribe people.

== Public amenities ==
The village is equipped with the Higher Secondary Kasturaba Gandhi Girls School with a hostel facility for the girls from lower caste backgrounds. There is a secondary high school. There are three primary schools up to 5th class.

The village has four Anganbaadi centers, and four Asha Kiran runs with the collaboration of UNICEF. There is a railway connectivity. The station code is HIR.

The village also enjoys electricity supply for a long time.

== Transport ==
Harinagar is connected by road as well as by railway. Anyone can reach the village by bike, car, buses or rail via Darbhanga Junction. There are two popular places near the village; one is Ber Chock and another is Supaul Bazar. From these two places, anyone can get a vehicle to reach the village. However, these facilities are only available up to 6:00 PM local time.

== Festivals ==
The villagers celebrate almost all Hindu festivals like Holi, Diwali/Deepawali, Kali Puja (worship), Chhath Puja, Maha Shivratri, and Basant Panchami. Among all the festivals, Judi-Sheetal is the most famous one in Harinagar. It is celebrated on 14 or 15 April each year.

== Temples ==
Harinagar contains One Shiv Temple, two Hanuman temples, a Kali temple, a Radha Krishna Campus and three Deehbaar Palaces.

It is notable that the whole population of Harinagar is of Hindu belief. No people with other religious beliefs reside there. Most of them are Bhaman by caste.

== Economy of village ==
The economy of the village is largely dependent on agriculture and pastoral work, as the villagers do not have any other option to work with industry. The villagers go out of the village in the quest of jobs in big cities where they work in industries and drive auto-rickshaws. The educated people work as teachers, doctors, supervisors, team-leaders, and engineers.

== Challenges before the villagers ==
The villagers are facing many challenges to fulfill the needs of their family. Employment problems are the biggest issue.

Struggling for quality education is the most important obstacle which hinders the development of the village. It is a big misfortune of the village that in spite of having so many educational institutions, the villagers still have to struggle for quality education. The teachers in these schools are less qualified as their degrees say. If one or two of them are qualified, they have been given extra educational duties to attain. In spite of all these difficulties, a significant change has occurred in the education system of the village. The majority of the students go for higher education, showing victory in several fields of study.

The position of women in the village is deteriorating, as Pardah systems are still prevalent, and they are not allowed to get higher education. In the last few years a significant check has been seen, but the treatment of women still has far to go.
