= Brajkishore Prasad =

Indian activist (1877–1946)

- Born: 1877; Srinagar, Bengal Presidency, British India (now Bihar, India)
- Died: 1946 (aged 68–69)
- Occupations: Lawyer, Freedom fighter
- Known for: Role in Indian Independence Movement, Champaran and Kheda Satyagraha
- Spouse: Phuljhari Devi
- Children: Vishwa Nath, Shiv Nath Prasad (SN Prasad), Prabhavati Devi, Vidyawati

Brajkishore Prasad (1877–1946) was a lawyer inspired by Mohandas Gandhi during the Indian Independence Movement.

== Early life and education ==
Born in a Kayastha family in Srinagar, Bengal Presidency (now in Siwan district), Prasad gained his early education in Chhapra and Patna before moving to Presidency College in Calcutta, where he completed his legal training.

He married Phuljhari Devi. He set up a legal practise in Darbhanga and had two sons, Vishwa Nath and Shiv Nath Prasad, more commonly known as SN Prasad, and two daughters, Prabhavati Devi and Vidyawati.

== Career ==
He met with Mahatma Gandhi in 1915 and was inspired. He decided to get involved full-time in the freedom struggle and gave up his legal practice. He was instrumental in Gandhi taking up the Champaran and Kheda Satyagraha, in which Gandhi handpicked Rajendra Prasad and Anugrah Narayan Sinha along with him to successfully lead the movement. Gandhi was so impressed by Prasad's dedication that he set aside a full chapter on him in his autobiographical book, The Story of My Experiments with Truth, called "The Gentle Bihari".

Prasad remained at the forefront of the freedom struggle in Bihar, and his collaboration with several colleagues was instrumental in the setting up of the Bihar Vidyapeeth. For the last ten years of his life he was severely infirmed, and died in 1946.

The National Book Trust, India, recently published a biography titled Braja Kishore Prasad: The Hero of Many Battles, authored by Sachidanand Sinha.
