= Trolley Times =

Indian newspaper founded in 2020

- Type: Bi-weekly
- Format: Broadsheet
- Owner: Trolley Times
- Publisher: Trolley Times
- Founded: 18 December 2020; 5 years ago
- Language: Hindi and Gurmukhi
- Headquarters: Tikri, Delhi-Haryana Border, Haryana, India
- Country: India
- Circulation: 5000 (as of 22 December 2020)
- Website: trolleytimes.com

Trolley Times is a four-page biweekly newspaper in Gurmukhi and Hindi. It was founded on 18 December 2020 to represent farmers at the Delhi-Haryana border protesting in response to alleged attempts by mainstream media to malign and misrepresent the 2020–2021 Indian farmers' protest.

== History ==
The newspaper was started by a team of activists including a freelance journalist, a film writer, a video director, two documentary photographers, a physiotherapist, and a farmer. The first edition of the broadsheet was issued on 18 December 2020, the 23rd day of the protest. The first issue had a print order of 2,000 copies while the second issue had a print order of 5,000 copies.

== Objective ==
The objective of Trolley Times is to provide a platform to farmers. It also provides hard copies for older farmers who are not familiar with digital and social media. The editors of Trolley Times have stated that the newspaper is run by volunteers and operates 'without any political or monitory pressure'. They also stated that is not an official publication of the Sanyukt Kisan Morcha, the umbrella organization representing 40 farmer's unions.

== Content ==
The founders have said that Trolley Times aims to provide news and commentary about the farmers movement to the participants and supporters. The farm movement "stretches across 25-30 km and touches half a dozen borders". The paper also aims to be an alternative voice as the protestors have little faith in mainstream media. The first issue of the Trolley Times had 'pictures, opinion pieces, editorials, poems, cartoons, and speeches'.

Ajay Natt said on 18 December that "the first page of the paper will carry the editorial as well as the daily developments and announcements, the second page will have photographs and artwork and the third page will have news and views from across the world in support of the farmers' agitation while the fourth page will be for light reading as it will have interesting events unfolding at the agitation sites such as wrestling matches between Punjab and Haryana, or classrooms set up to educate the poor students." While there were apprehensions about regularly curating and creating content for the newspaper, there has been an overwhelming response with hundreds of people sending in different types of content.

The second edition featured reports and photographs from various protest sites, including Palwal, Singhu, Ghazipur, Bikaner, Patiala, Tarn Taran, and New York. The fourth edition has reports on the workers movement including Mazdoor Mukti Morcha. The fifth edition, published on 5 January, carried a story on Bikramdeep Singh Pannu, a protester who has a Ghadar Party flag on his trolley and had participated in the Shaheen Bagh Protest.

== Digital and online publications ==
The Trolley Times has a digital version in Gurmukhi-Punjabi and Hindi. The first and second editions have been translated into English and are accessible online. The second edition of the paper was uploaded on 22 December 2020. Since then eleven editions of the Trolley Times have been published.

In a March 2021 interview Trolley Times editor and photojournalist Navkiran Natt told Germany's Deutsche Welle News that for godi-media, "their primary platform is social media but our audience is an old farmer, for whom media is synonymous with a physical newspaper."

In addition to the Trolley Times, the team has launched "Trolley Talkies", an "alternate medium" for people to express "solidarity with the farmers". Since 2 January 2021, the Trolley Times started screening documentaries and movies at their makeshift hall. Movies have included; Peepli Live, Punjab 1984, Chaar Sahibzade 2, Sajjan Singh Rangroot, The Legend of Bhagat Singh, Manthan.The team is exploring starting "talk shows by farmers which will also be up on Instagram, YouTube and Facebook.”

== Slogans ==
The slogan on the First Edition of the English version of the paper reads, "The sword of revolution is sharpened on the whetstone of ideas" by Bhagat Singh. The rallying call for the second edition of Trolley Times read, "O Martyrs, to complete your pending work… We shall give our heart and soul."

== See also ==
- 2020–2021 Indian farmers' protest
- Sanyukt Kisan Morcha
- Community journalism
- Journalism
