= Godi media =

Term for pro-government media in India

Godi media (Hindi pronunciation: [ˈɡoːd̪iː]; lit. 'media sitting on lap'; idiomatic equivalent: 'lapdog media') is a term coined and popularised by veteran Indian journalist Ravish Kumar to describe biased Indian print and TV news media, which has openly supported the ruling Bharatiya Janata Party government since 2014. The term is sometimes said to be a pun on the name of Indian prime minister Narendra Modi and has become a common way to refer to television and other media that are perceived as "mouthpieces of the ruling party" (i.e. the BJP).

== Coinage ==
The term was coined and popularised by a veteran journalist Ravish Kumar, which translates to "media sitting on the lap like a lapdog". In one of his shows, Kumar used silent actors to mime "godi media". This was accompanied by miming what the currently ruling party leaders wanted to listen to, using the Hindi film song "Bagon Mein Bahar Hai" (translation: "There is spring in the gardens"). It is viewed by some as a pun on the name of Indian prime minister Narendra Modi.

Detractors of Godi media allege that instead of practising honest journalism, such media publishes fake news and inflammatory stories, which are often untrue, working in the interest of the BJP government and Hindutva ideology of the Sangh Parivar or corporate and elite sources for their benefit. Media houses and news entities alleged as Godi media include Zee News, Times Now, India Today, Republic Bharat, Republic TV, Aaj Tak, ABP News, Sudarshan News, CNN-News18, India TV, the TV Today Network, NDTV, Firstpost and others.

== Background ==
As per an opinion piece by Debasish Roy Chowdhury for Time magazine, Modi's ascension to national power in 2014 led to the taming of India's media. His rise coincided with a reorganisation of the editorial authority of some of India's most important news institutions, particularly national television networks. The previous generation of senior editors, who were viewed as more devoted to India's liberal outlook than the BJP's Hindutva ideology, were moved out on charges of having left-wing biases, and new channels and news anchors with devotion to the BJP and Modi were developed. Because of their large state and party advertising budgets, India's state and central governments hold considerable control over media companies, more so since the decline in television viewership and the rise of online news and YouTube resulting from increased access to the Internet. In the 2019–20 fiscal year, the central government alone spent roughly ₹1.95 crore (equivalent to ₹2.5 crore or US$260,000 in 2026) on advertisements per day. Access to power and business favours are additional incentives for the media to continue with the pro-BJP messages. This ensures that bad news never affects the government or goes public. With a few exceptions, the government has made sure that the media outlets seek government approval for their reporting and in exchange, the channels are rewarded with contracts to host advertisements of government schemes and products of corporate entities. The term was also widely used at the time of the Citizenship Amendment Act protests and the 2020–2021 Indian farmers' protest, with the claim that the protests and the farmers were not being represented fairly and were instead being vilified as Khalistani supporters.

Godi media is actively involved in promoting the personality cult of Narendra Modi. Many such outlets pictured Modi as an invincible figure, the 2024 general elections as a 'foregone conclusion' and instead focused on the 2029 general elections. Modi also rarely appears on media interviews and only attends interviews conducted by journalists that hold favorable views towards him which has been criticized as an exercise of cultivating personality. Modi notably claimed himself to be of divine origins in one such interview.

According to a report by CMS Media Lab, a nonpartisan subsidiary of the research organisation, during 2019 general election, Modi, received 33.21% of the primetime news coverage while leaders of competing political parties such as Arvind Kejriwal, representing Aam Aadmi Party and Rahul Gandhi, representing Indian National Congress received 10.31% and 4.33% prime-time news telecast coverage respectively. This aspect has been criticised for providing unfair advantage in BJP's subsequent victory. The ruling NDA Alliance was reduced from 353 to 293 seats in the 543 member Lok Sabha in the 2024 Indian general elections, contrary to their exit poll estimates of several outlets obtaining around or even more than 400 seats in line with the BJP campaigning slogan, 'Abki Baar 400 Paar' which has also been criticised as crowd manipulation orchestrated by the media.

During the 2024 Bangladesh anti-Hindu riots, several Godi media outlets were involved in spreading fake news, disseminating disinformation related to the events, and discrediting the interim government. Canada's Rapid Response Mechanism submitted a report in 2024 criticising the reporting on Canadian Prime Minister Justin Trudeau by several Indian news outlets, which they characterised as "Modi-aligned media (engaging in) foreign interference in Canada's federal elections" and accusing Trudeau of converting Canada into another haven of 'anti-India terrorists'. The report also claimed that these media outlets amplified narratives against Trudeau during the 2023-25 Canada-India diplomatic row.

== Protests ==
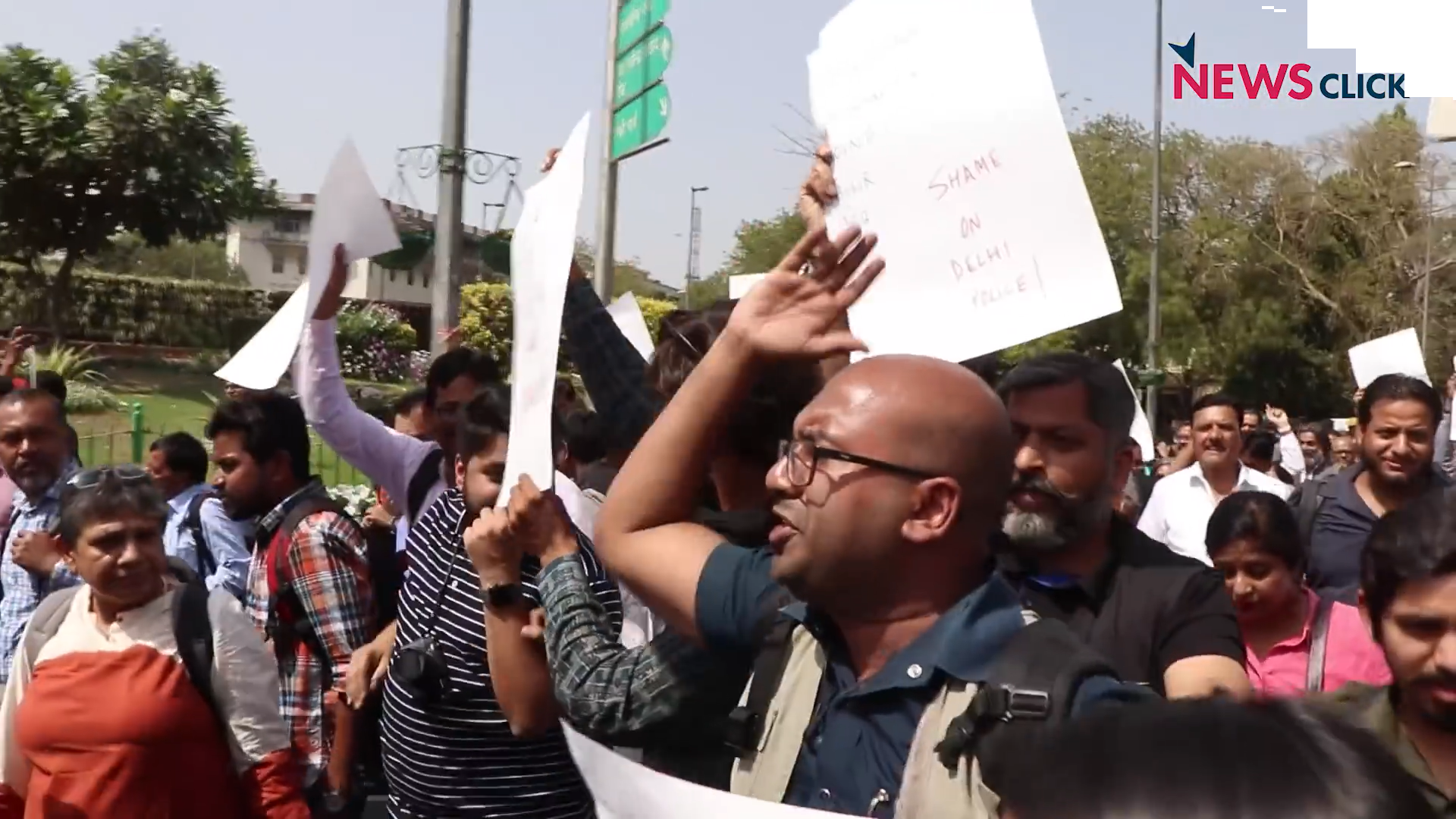
Journalists marching in Delhi for press freedom, March 2018

In 2018, on World Press Freedom Day, many journalists and social activists held a demonstration which protested, among other things, against the "godi media".

The News Broadcasting and Digital Standards Authority (NBDSA) called for several television news programmes to be taken down and fine paid, for their role in spreading Islamophobia and communal disharmony.

In the aftermath of 2025 Pahalgam attack, residents of Kashmir Valley gathered for protests against 'Godi media' near Lal Chowk in Srinagar and shouted slogans against ABP News and its news anchor Chitra Tripathi for its communal coverage of the attack.

A youth satirical political movement, Cockroach Janta Party, that gained significant traction in India due to Chief Justice of India, Surya Kant's remarks comparing youth social media activists and independent journalists (termed as the fifth estate) to cockroaches in May 2026, declared in its manifesto "All media houses owned by the Adani Group and Reliance Industries shall have their licences cancelled to make way for independent media. Bank accounts of "Godi media anchors" shall be investigated".

=== Boycott of Journalists ===
In the run-up to the 2024 general elections, a 14 journalist boycott was announced on 18 September 2023, by the Indian National Developmental Inclusive Alliance (INDIA), a 28-party opposition bloc based on allegations that these journalists and channels are sycophants of the ruling Bharatiya Janata Party (BJP) and that were considered as the representative faces of "godi media", biased against the opposition, promote hate speech and spread misinformation.

- Arnab Goswami (Republic TV)
- Navika Kumar (Times Now)
- Sushant Sinha (Times Now Navbharat)
- Sudhir Chaudhary (Aaj Tak)
- Chitra Tripathi (ABP News)
- Aman Chopra (News18)
- Amish Devgan (News18)
- Anand Narasimhan (News18)
- Rubika Liyaquat (Bharat24)
- Gaurav Sawant (India Today)
- Shiv Aroor (India Today)
- Prachi Parashar (India TV)
- Aditi Tyagi (Bharat Express)
- Ashok Shrivastav (DD News)

The alliance has also alleged that the journalists and channels have used their platforms to attack the opposition and its leaders. The 14 journalists boycotted by the INDIA Alliance have all denied the allegations against them, claiming they are committed to fair and unbiased journalism, and that they will not be silenced by the boycott. The BJP has also accused the alliance of trying to silence the media and of being intolerant of dissent. The boycott has been met with criticism from some quarters, including the News Broadcasters and Digital Association (NBDA) and also international organisations like Reporters Committee for Freedom of the Press, Committee to Protect Journalists (CPJ), Amnesty International, criticising the boycott as an attack on freedom of the press. However, the INDIA alliance has defended its decision, arguing that it is necessary to protect democracy from the harmful effects of biased and hateful media coverage.

== Impact ==
French NGO, Reporters Without Borders (RSF) cited "recent rise of Godi media" in its Press Freedom Index report on India, while placing it 157th out of 180 countries in 2026. The dominance of Godi media within the mainstream news media of the country has led to the rise of alternative media, such as Trolley Times, produced by activists, for news coverage during 2020–2021 Indian farmers' protest. Many alternative media have also taken to Internet platforms like online newsreporting, web feeding and YouTube as their main platforms of connecting with the masses without government interference. Prominent media outlets that have arisen directly to oppose the Godi media are The Wire, The Quint, Scroll.in, and Newslaundry. Many of these outlets are operated by those media persons who were removed from their positions in news media channels after 2014 following premiership of Modi. Several YouTubers like Akash Banerjee, Abhisar Sharma, Dhruv Rathee, and Ravish Kumar have also emerged as competitors of traditional media in their individual capacities.

== See also ==
- Freedom of press in India
- Fake news in India
- Public image of Narendra Modi
- Media bias
- Yellow journalism
- Politico-media complex
- Presstitute
- Saffronisation
- Manufacturing Consent
- While We Watched
