= Public image of Narendra Modi =

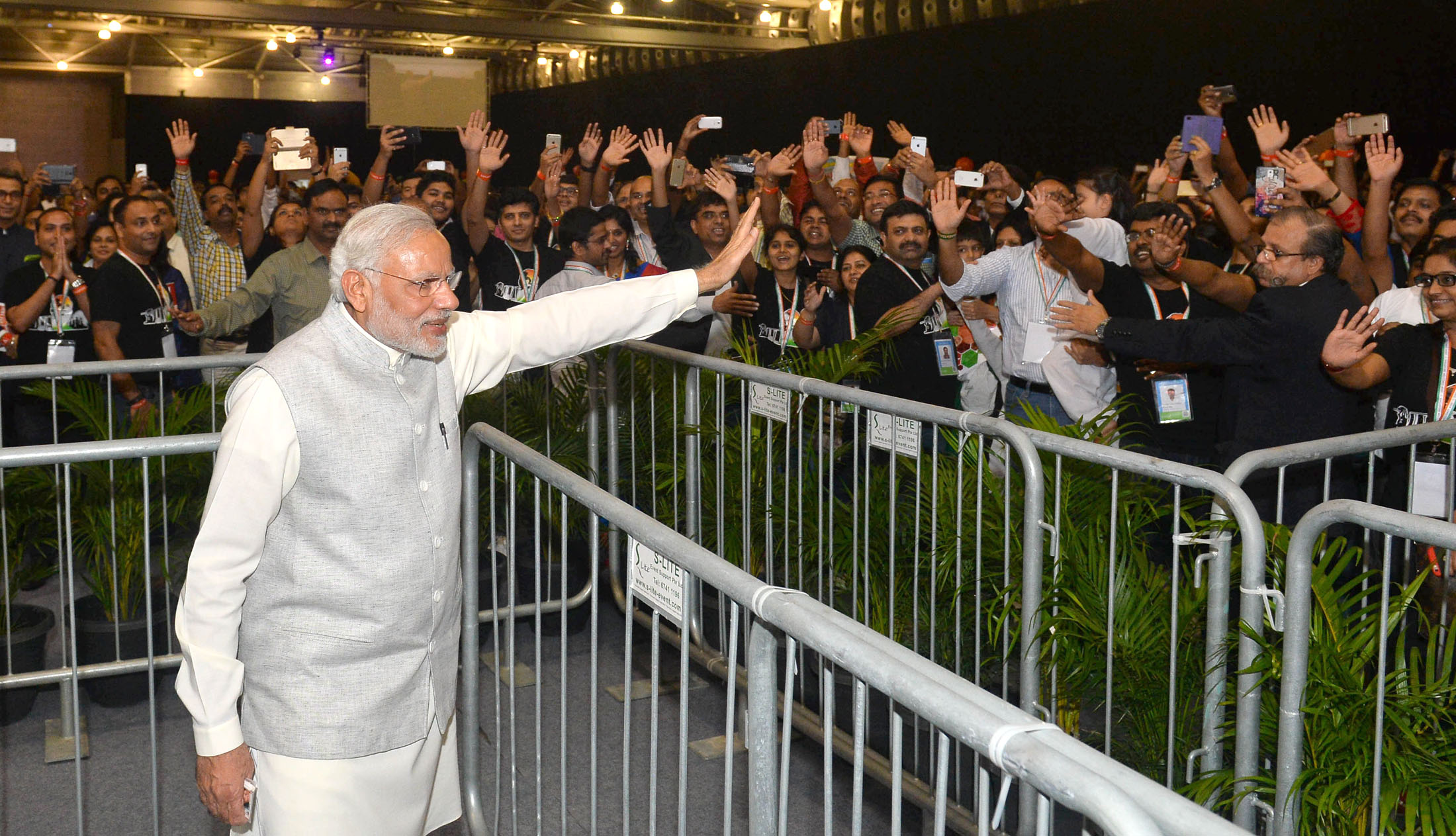
Narendra Modi at an Indian Community Reception event in Singapore, November 24, 2015

Narendra Modi, the prime minister of India since 2014, has elicited a number of public perceptions regarding his personality, image, background, and policies.

Modi started his public career in the Rashtriya Swayamsevak Sangh (RSS), a far-right Hindutva paramilitary organisation, in the 1970s as a Pracharak (transl. propagator). He was deputed by the RSS to their political arm, the Bharatiya Janata Party (BJP) in the 1980s. Modi's skills at organising successful political campaigns saw him rising in the party hierarchy through the 1990s in his native state of Gujarat. He served as the chief minister of Gujarat from 2001 to 2014. The beginning of his tenure as the chief minister saw the sectarian riots of 2002, and the subsequent visa ban by many foreign governments. His overall tenure as chief minister saw faster economic development in Gujarat relative to other Indian states. This gave him the moniker, Vikas Purush (transl. development man). Elections in India to the Lok Sabha since 2014 Indian general election have been fought with Modi at the center of the campaigns. Modi has served as the prime minister of India since 2014.

Modi has received consistently high approval ratings during his premiership. He has consistently topped in the list of most popular leaders in surveys done in the leaders' own countries. Similarly he has received criticism for his divisive politics and misleading statements.

The BJP, for its national and regional elections in the last ten years, has used Modi as the central figure of their campaigns. Modi has used social media, government media outlets, and a careful control over his appearances, to cultivate his image.

== Perception through the years ==
Journalist Ashis Nandy, who is also a trained psychologist, was one of the first to interview Modi when the latter was an RSS pracharak (propagator) at the height of the Ram Janmabhoomi campaign in the early 1990s. At that time in Modi, he found "a classic, clinical case of a fascist".

Soon after becoming the chief minister of Gujarat, the state was convulsed by sectarian riots in 2002.The complicity of Modi's government in the pogrom against the Muslim minorities made Modi a pariah for many years. The United States and many European countries imposed visa bans on Modi after the riots. These remained in force for many years and were lifted shortly before he became prime minister in 2014

After the Gujarat riots, Modi embarked on a strategy to make the state a friendly place to set up business and rebrand his image from being a Hindu hardliner to a development oriented leader. This led to him being dubbed as Vikas Purush (transl. development man). This was the main theme during his successful campaign in 2014.

In September 2013 Modi was named the BJP's candidate for prime minister ahead of the 2014 Lok Sabha election. Several BJP leaders initially expressed opposition to Modi's candidature, including BJP founding member L. K. Advani. Contrary to the strategies used by the party during previous elections, Modi personally played the dominant role in the BJP's presidential style election campaign. The 2014 election campaign was the first time he declared that he was married but had remained estranged from his wife, Jashodaben almost from the beginning of their married life. Upon the disclosure, lawsuits were filed against him for forging previous election documents as against prescribed rules of the Representation of the People Act.

Modi has for years presented himself as an able administrator with an eye for detail. But his reputation as a vigilant administrator started to lose its shine in 2016 when his demonetisation policy caused distress to millions of Indians who largely relied on cash. Some critics termed this as "Tughalakīfaramāna" (transl. Tughlaq's diktat) after Mohammed Tughlaq, the 14th century erratic sultan of Delhi. His reputation took a further hit in March 2020 when he imposed a complete lockdown in the country at four hours notice to stop the spread of COVID-19. This led to millions losing their jobs and many lost their lives. The Indian economy also shrunk in percentage terms by double digit numbers, although he received high approval ratings for his COVID-19 response in 2020. However by May 2021, his ratings had sharply fallen to 63% during the second COVID-19 wave, the lowest since 2019, according to an US firm that had been tracking his ratings since. For foreign observers, his nationalist impulses are always paired with a sense of technocratic competence. But according to Christopher Clary, assistant professor of political science at the State University of New York, technocratic competence was entirely missing from his response to the second wave of the COVID-19 pandemic in India in early 2021.

Right at the beginning of the Covid pandemic in March 2020, Modi set up the PM CARES Fund with himself, and his senior cabinet colleagues, namely the ministers of defence, home, and finance as the trustees of the fund. The Government of India had initially claimed that the fund is a private fund, and denied that the PM CARES Fund is a public fund for the purposes of transparency laws such as the Right to Information Act 2005, even though the Fund uses government infrastructure and the national emblem of the Government of India. The total amount of funds donated and the names of donors have not been publicly disclosed, and the fund is privately audited. The lack of transparency and accountability has been continuously criticised.– In December 2020, the Government of India reversed its stance and admitted that the PM CARES Fund was a public fund, but still refused to disclose information regarding it under the Right to Information Act 2005. Modi was criticised for hiding out of view when the deadly second wave of Covid hit India in April 2021 which the WHO estimates caused 4.7 million deaths. A report by the Center for Global Development also indicated that excess deaths in India could be up to 4.9 million during the second COVID-19 wave. Modi observers have noted that he has a tendency to shy away from bad news when faced with a turmoil.

Although India is a parliamentary democracy, Modi has a penchant for passing laws with minimum or no debate in the two houses of Parliament. The controversial farm reform laws were passed with less than three hours of debate in either house in September 2020. After a year long protests, Modi in November 2021 repealed the laws in three minutes in the Lok Sabha and nine minutes in the Rajya Sabha. In both cases, without any discussion.

Modi has often used a messianic tone in his speeches such as saying that his leadership qualities came from God. His latest claim to divinity was during the 2024 Lok Sabha elections when he said that while his mother was alive, he believed that he was born biologically but after her death he got convinced that God had sent him.

== Communication strategies ==
Modi has been an early adopter of communication technology since his days as the chief minister of Gujarat. In 2007, he hired Washington based APCO, one of the largest PR and lobbying firms in the world to help with his communication strategy. Modi has used multiple strategies to build up his image. These include use of Social media, government media outlets, a distinct attire, and be front and centre of Indian public life. Also he rarely gives interviews or holds a press conference. The machinery for this works also includes ad makers, speechwriters and assorted spinners managing Modi's image and campaigns. During his years in power as the prime minister, Modi has made it sure that his images appear everywhere including on billboards, newspapers, TV advertisements, vaccine certificates, and in 2025 at car showrooms to have his image on notice announcing reduction in GST on vehicles. Modi's picture on the government issued COVID vaccine certificate has riled many people in India. In criticising it, Mamata Banerjee, the chief minister of West Bengal demanded Modi's picture to be on death certificates too. Modi also uses a messianic tone in his speeches such as saying that his leadership qualities came from God. The Modi administration has also made numerous changes in government-approved history textbooks that de-emphasised the role of the former prime minister Jawaharlal Nehru and glorified that of Modi. . The Indian government uses a number of public relations and lobbying agencies including in the United States of America. In 2026, it was ascertained that Mercury Public Affairs, an American lobbying firm had been hired with a retainer fee of $75,000 per month after the re-election of Donald Trump. It was revealed by the company that they had organized Trump's X post congratulating Modi for his tenure as the longest-serving Indian prime minister. Another firm, SHW Partners LLC, had organized eight phone calls and had been contracted by the Indian government for $150,000 per month from April 2025 to June 2026.

=== Inauguration ceremonies ===
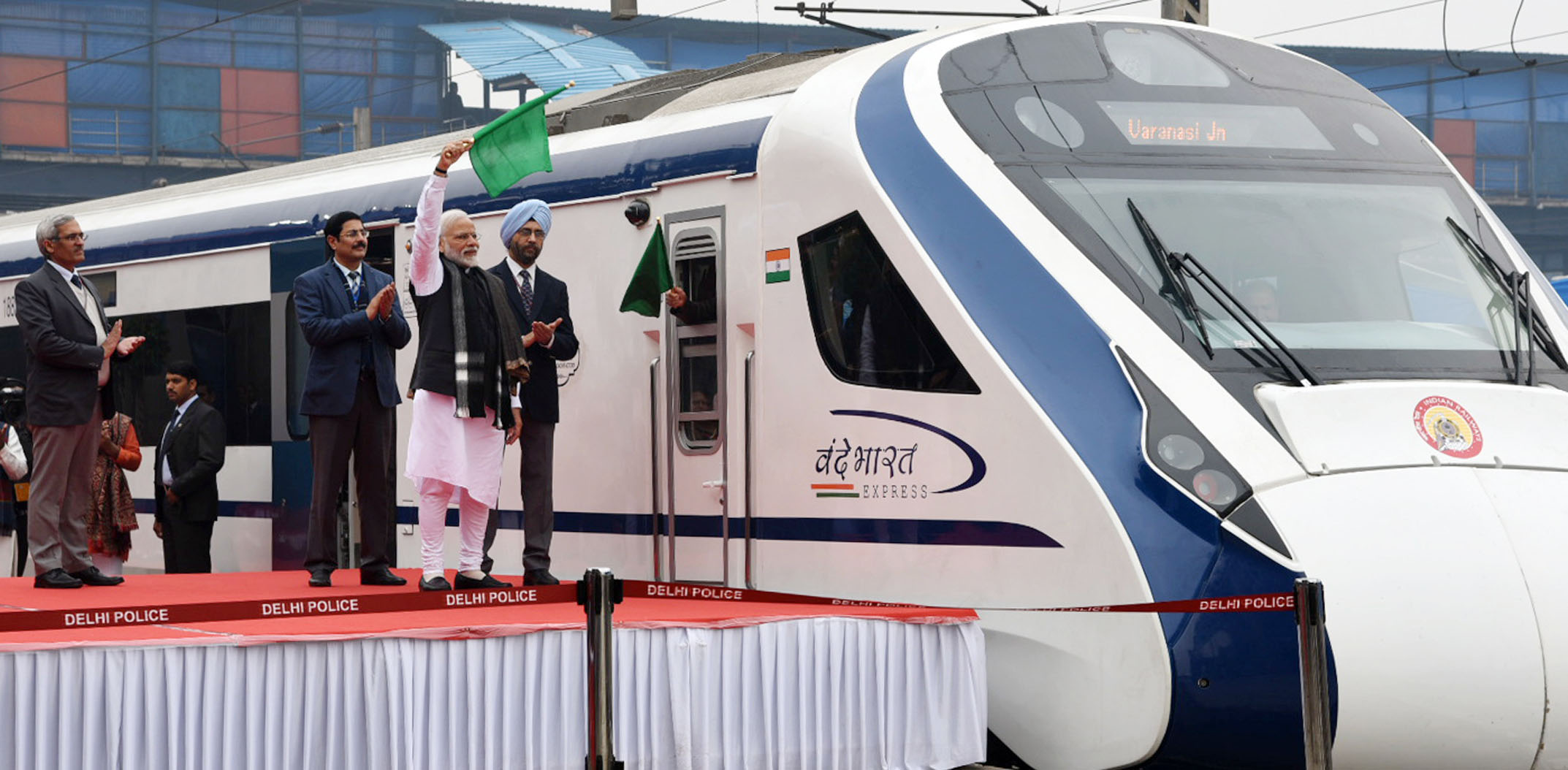
Modi flagging off the first Semi High Speed Train “Vande Bharat Express”, at New Delhi Railway Station on February 15, 2019

Since becoming prime minister, Modi and his team has made sure that he presides over all the important public events such as the inauguration of the new Indian parliament building, the ground breaking ceremony of the Ayodhya temple, the opening of a new corridor going towards the Kashi Vishwanath temple and the installation of the statue of Lord Ram in the newly built Ayodhya temple. He also flags off all the new services of the high speed "Vande Bharat" trains. He has faced criticism from the opposition for violating the protocol by opening the new parliament complex himself rather than by the president of India, the highest executive of the country. Many religious figures stayed away from the opening of the Ayodhya temple because construction was not complete at the time of the consecration, and therefore against Hindu scriptures in their opinion.

=== Social media ===
One of the main strategies used by Narendra Modi and his government has been the extensive use of Social media to directly communicate with the public. In September 2014 Modi became the second-most-followed leader in the world with 5 million Twitter followers. Modi's 31 August 2012 post on the, now defunct, Google Hangouts made him the first Indian politician to interact with the public on live chat. Modi was the second-most-followed leader in the world (with over 30 million followers on Twitter, as of June 2017 behind only Barack Obama. For the 2014 elections, The BJP's National Digital Operations Centre (NDOC) led a group of volunteers for the social media campaign. The volunteers were charged with trolling and attacking mainstream journalists considered unfavorable to Modi. The group was headed by Arvind Gupta. Gupta joined the team in 2009 and for 2014 election campaign, he was in charge of websites, uploading videos of rallies and meetings, distributing them to media houses, and posting comments and releases and trolling opponents online.

As of July, 2024, Modi is the most-followed world leader and head of government on Instagram, with over 91 millions followers. His Instagram account is the 42th most followed account on the platform. In July 2024, Modi became the most followed world leader on X (Twitter) with 100 millions followers. Elon Musk, the chairman of X, congratulated him.

There has been concern over misinformation and fake news being spread on social media platforms, particularly on WhatsApp, by the BJP under Modi.

=== Mann Ki Baat ===
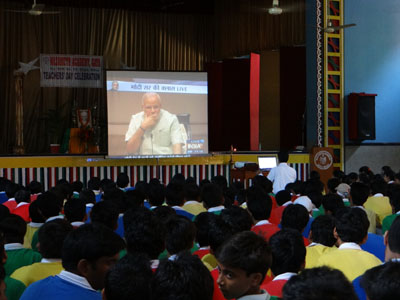
Students watching Modi presenting Mann ki Baat

Modi's use of social media has been at the expense of traditional media such as Television and print media. Since coming to power in 2014, Modi has also been hosting a monthly monologue called Mann Ki Baat on the government owned All India radio and Doordarshan. His supporters applaud the use of an old fashioned medium like radio to promote positive social causes while his detractors call it another propaganda tactic by Modi to reach out to millions of people untouched by the internet.

=== Mainstream Media ===
Modi has been called a controversial, polarising and divisive figure by many media sources. There are reports that Modi and his government are highly anxious to avoid negative media attention. Journalists and public figures have lost their jobs following criticism of Modi. In January 2023, the Modi led Indian government ordered YouTube and Twitter to block links to a BBC documentary India: The Modi Question critical of Modi's handling of 2002 Gujarat riots. Modi rarely gave interviews in his 10 years as prime minister. On occasions he did, pliant journalists typically allowed him to project himself as the leader of a flourishing democracy. The journalists who ended up talking to him adopted an uncritical approach and they seldom questioned him on issues of national importance and, instead, cheerleading him and his policies. Modi changed his policy on media interviews during the 2024 Lok Sabha campaign where he granted nearly 70 interviews to friendly media outlets. Critics claimed that this may have been done in order to stem his waning popularity. Choosing the media outlets have been easier since Modi came to power because most of these outlets are now owned corporations that rely on government patronage

=== Selfie booths ===
Since 2022, one of the new strategies adopted by the BJP government has been to install selfie booths, showcasing the country’s development with large cut-out images of Modi, at public places such as Railway stations, defence establishments, and colleges. Opposition leader, Mallikarjun Kharge has criticised this waste of public money and Modi's self-obsession.

== Personal appearance ==
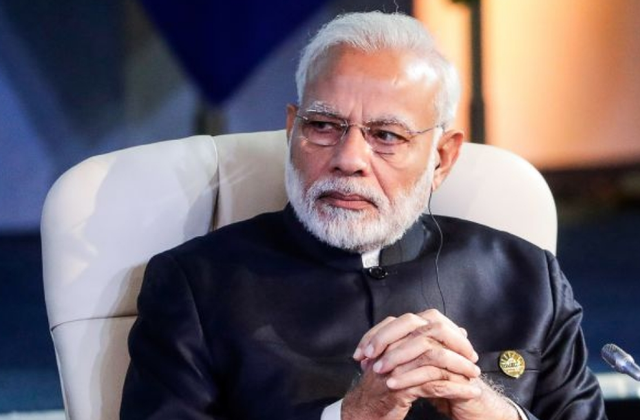
Narendra Modi

God has gifted me the sense of mixing and matching colours. So I manage everything on my own. Since I'm God gifted I fit well in everything. I have no fashion designer but I'm happy to hear that I dress well.

— Narendra Modi, in The Modi Effect by Lance Price

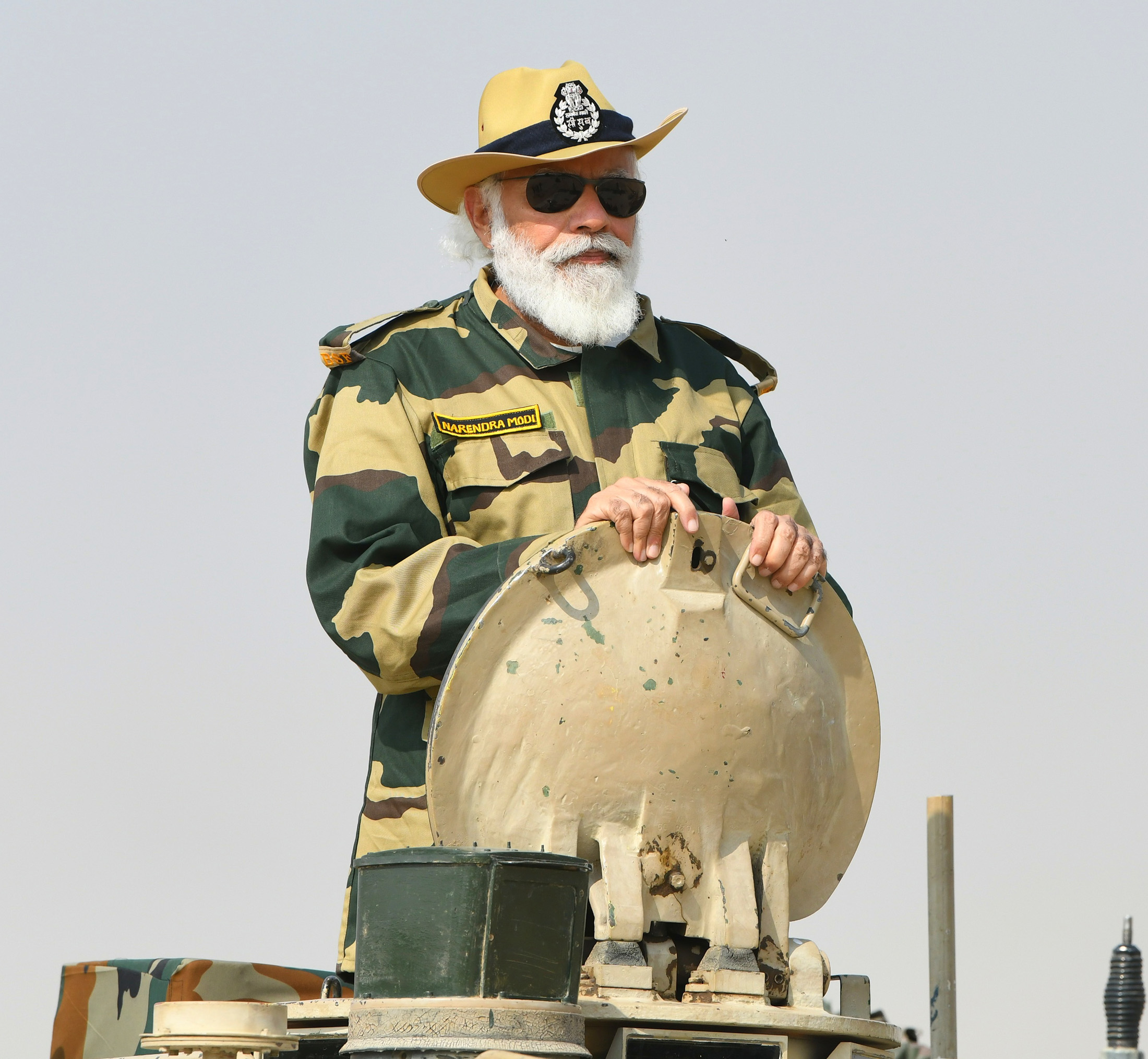
Modi in full army fatigues riding in an Army tank at Longewala in Jaisalmer, Rajasthan on November 14, 2020

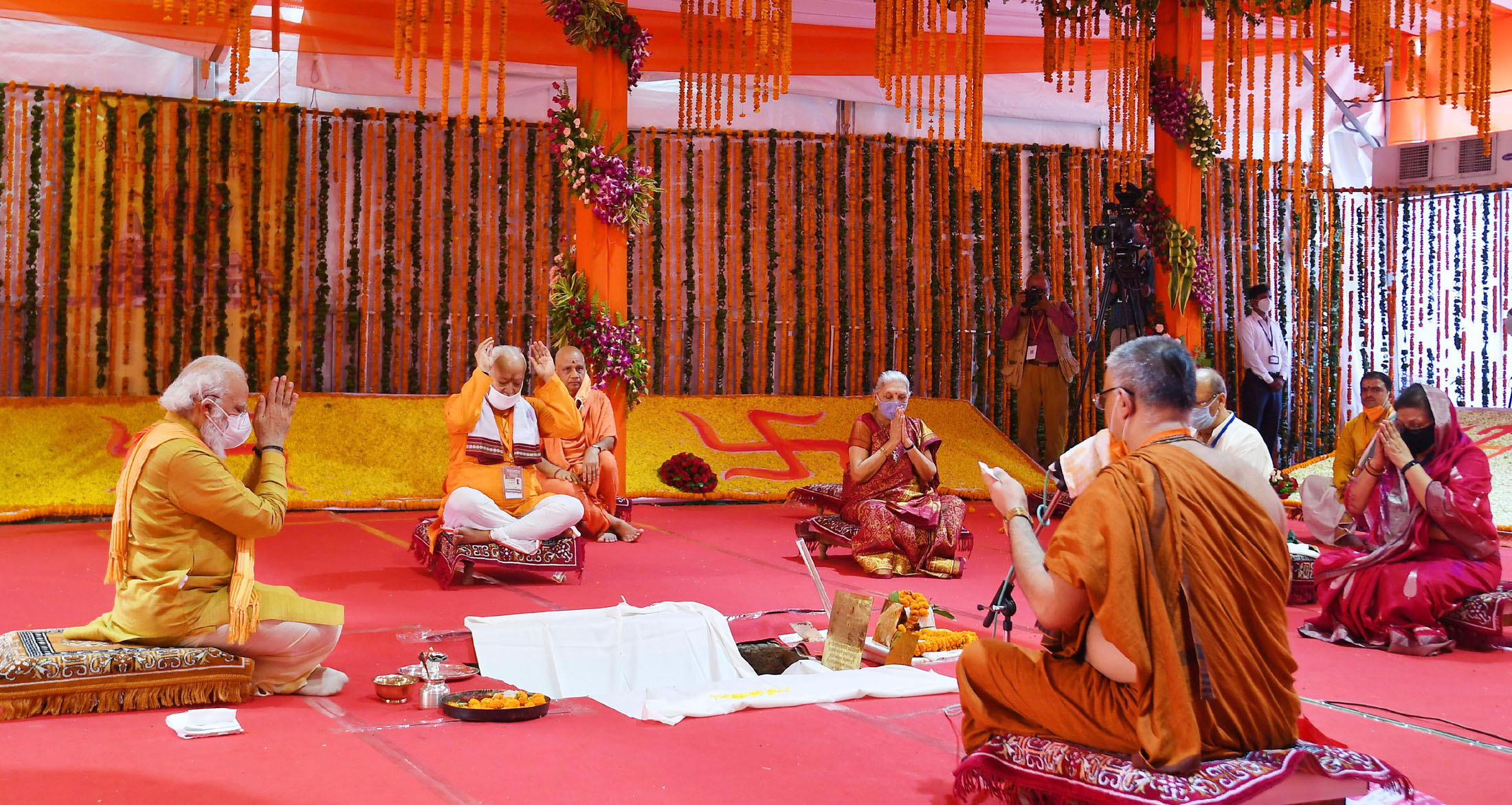
Modi performing the groundbreaking ceremony at Ram Mandir in Ayodhya, Uttar Pradesh on 5 August 2020

Modi has used his choice of clothes at different occasions to make visual statements. As a populist leader he uses his choice of clothes to appeal and identify with the people, show his outsider or anti-elite credentials, and project a strong leadership. To show support for Indian designed weapons, in November 2023, Modi donned a flight suit and took a flight over Bangalore in the locally designed Tejas fighter jet. He likes to project an image of the saviour of Hindu India. This was seen in his appearances in 2020 at foundation stone ceremonies at Ayodhya and the New parliament building in New Delhi where he donned saffron color outfits and presided over various Hindu religious rituals. Modi has been careful in how his images appear since his days as the chief minister of Gujarat. He always avoids raising his right palm because that is the symbol of the rival Congress party. He also avoids the color green because that is associated with Islam and also black. Modi donned safron robes with a flowing beard at the end of the election campaign in May 2019, when he travelled to a mountain cave in the Himalayas at Kedarnath for meditation. He was heavily mocked by national and international media for conducting his meditation (tapasya in Sanskrit) in a cave that had an attached toilet, a heater, a bathing area, an electric geyser, a telephone, WiFi, and a grand view. A cameraperson was allowed to record the session. After the conclusion of voting in the 2024 general election, Modi decided to conduct his meditation in full media glare at the Vivekanand memorial in Kanyakumari.

Early during his premiership, Modi was called a fashion leader in India, and his clothing choices were discussed internationally. The type of vest regularly worn by Modi has become popular, and been called Modi Jacket. Modi's usual attire is a kurta and a vest, and his half-sleeve kurta is sometimes called the Modi Kurta. Modi's clothes are made of silk or cotton, are crisply ironed and are handmade in Gujarat. When he was chief minister he wore bold, bright colours, changing to pastels as prime minister. For holidays, Modi wears a traditional turban from wherever he is. Some of his clothing has been created by Bollywood fashion designer Troy Costa.

In January 2015 while receiving United States president Barack Obama in a state visit at the Hyderabad House, Modi wore a Nehru jacket with his name embroidered repeatedly in the pinstripes. Modi claimed that the suit was gifted to him. Modi's political opposition criticised his wearing the suit, complaining that he campaigns on an image of coming from a poor background and living without money while at the same time wearing luxury products such as this suit. Other commentators said that in choosing this suit Modi was being a parvenu, at the height of vanity, going to a ridiculous extreme, and political opposition party leader Jairam Ramesh said that he was a megalomaniac. A month later, the suit was auctioned for US$695,000 and amount was directly donated to the Clean Ganga Mission. Journalist Siddharth Varadarajan commented on the public support for the auction by saying "the manner in which Mr. Modi's leadership has been projected is extremely unhealthy in any democratic society". The making of the suit was done free of cost by Jade Blue, however he still managed to auction the suit for US$695,000 and contributed the entire amount for Clean Ganga project.

In 2009, Modi's clothing was said to be Bollywoodesque and indicative of Gujarat's modernism. According to Vogue India editor Priya Tanna in a New York Times blog, "Never before has there been such a strong convergence between what a politician in India stands for and his clothing." Tanna called his clothing choice "100% India": democratic, supportive of Indian industry (separating him from politicians in Western suits), emblematic of his humble birth, clean and hygienic. Responding to Tanna, another commentator said that Modi's fashion choice has no particular meaning and there is no need to interpret it.

One of the strategies that Modi and his handlers had used in the 2014 election was to project his "Hero" status is his "56-inch Chest". Although a masculine attribute, the 56-inch chest seems to have garnered him support from female voters. Author Manjima Chatterjee claims that Modi's perceived decisiveness makes him a sex symbol for women. His detractors, however, lampoon this attribute or try to demolish the myth by saying that it is only 44 inch.

== Popularity and influence ==
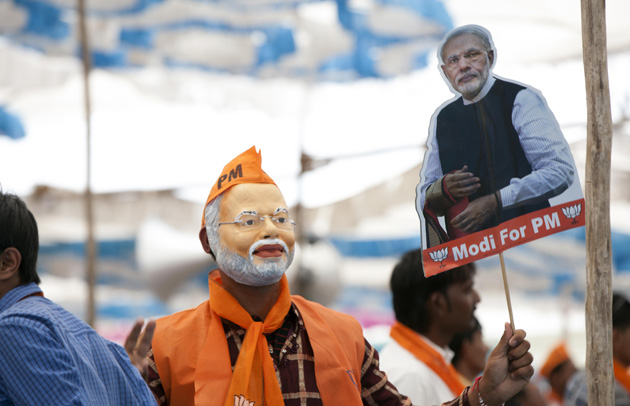
Mask wearing at a Modi election rally.

=== Opinion polls in India ===
In a nationwide survey concerning Indian Chief Ministers, Modi was named Best Chief Minister in 2007 by India Today. He has been considered the most popular and best prime minister of India according surveys conducted by many English language publications in India.

=== International opinion ===
In March 2012 and June 2014, Modi appeared on the cover of the Asian edition of Time Magazine, becoming one of the few Indian politicians to have done so. In 2014, CNN-News18 (formally CNN-IBN) news network awarded Modi Indian of the Year. In 2017, Gallup International Association (GIA) conducted a poll and ranked Modi third-top leader of the world. In 2014 was ranked the 15th-most-powerful person in the world by Forbes. In November 2017, a survey of Pew Research Center showed Modi to be the "by far" most popular figure in Indian politics. In this survey, Modi (88%) was ahead of Rahul Gandhi (58%), Sonia Gandhi (57%) and Arvind Kejriwal (39%).

Modi has consistently topped in the list of most influential global leaders in the world. In June 2015, Modi was featured on the cover of TIME Magazine and in 2014, 2015, 2017, 2020 and 2021, he was named one of Time magazine's 100 Most Influential People in the World. Forbes Magazine ranked him the 15th Most Powerful Person in the World in 2014 and the 9th Most Powerful Person in the World in 2015, 2016 and 2018. In 2015, Modi was ranked the 13th Most Influential Person in the World by Bloomberg Markets Magazine. Modi was ranked fifth on Fortune Magazine's first annual list of the "World's Greatest Leaders" in 2015. In 2021, TIME called Modi the third "pivotal leader" of independent India after Jawaharlal Nehru and Indira Gandhi who "dominated the country's politics like no one since them". Modi was featured in a cover story written by journalist and novelist, Aatish Taseer in a Time magazine article titled "India's divider in chief" in the May 20, 2019 issue. This was followed by an article, in the same magazine, written by Modi's British advisor, Manoj Ladwa titled, "Modi united India like no PM in decades" in the May 30, 2019 issue of Time magazine. In 2015, Modi was one of Time's "30 most influential people on the internet" as the second-most-followed politician on Twitter and Facebook, although as of July 2024, he is the most followed politician on Twitter, Instagram and Facebook in the world. In 2015, Modi was ranked 5th on Forbes magazine's list of 'World's Greatest Leaders'.

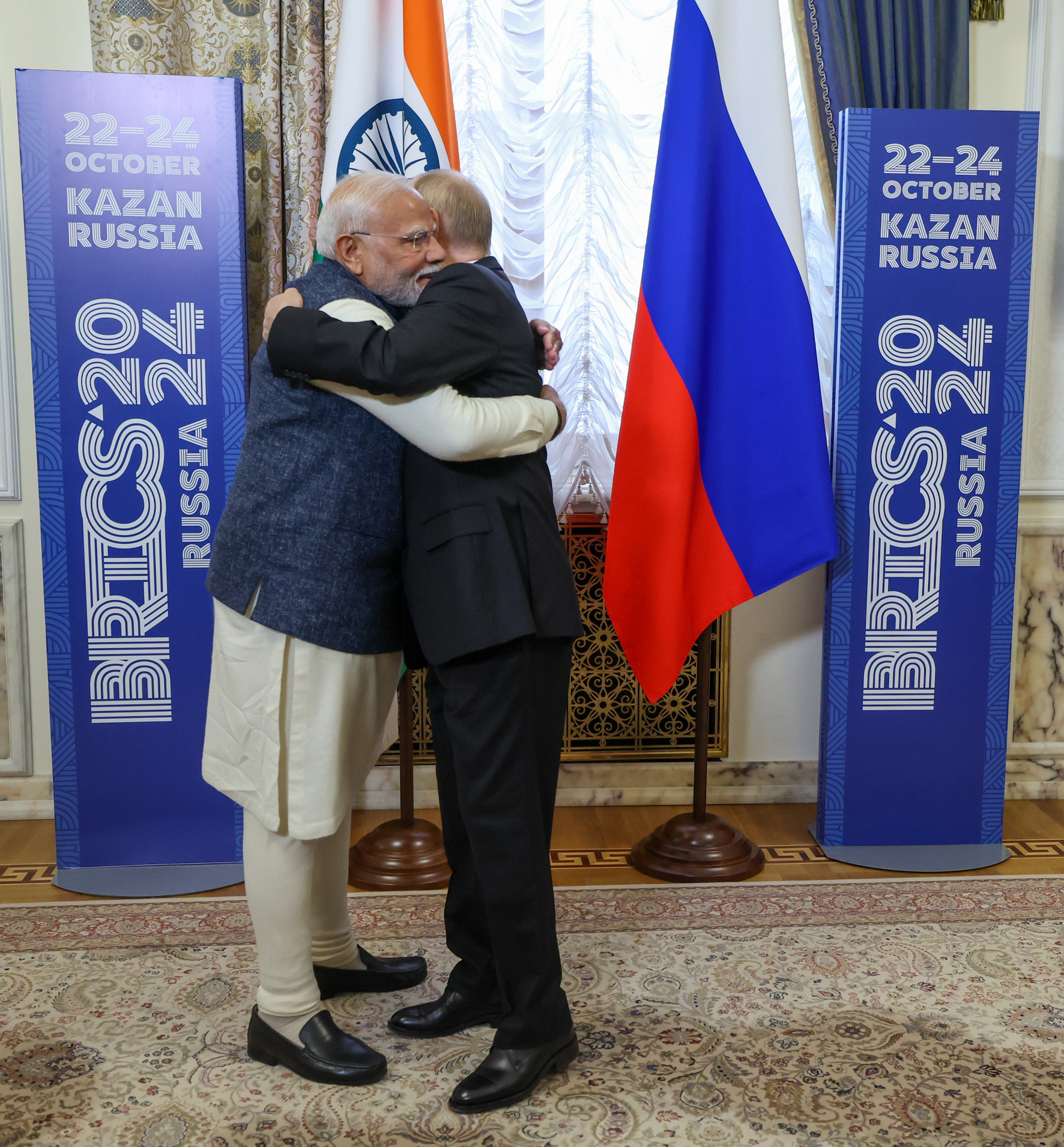
Modi's hug diplomacy with Vladimir Putin

In May 2023, during the Modi's visit to Australia, Australian Prime Minister Anthony Albanese called, "PM Modi is the boss" in Sydney on the stage of Qudos Bank Arena. He also added, "The last time I saw someone on the stage here was Bruce Springsteen, and he didn’t get the welcome that Prime Minister Modi has got". In November 2024, Guyana President Mohammed Irfaan Ali called, "Modi is a champion among the global leaders".

In September 2023, Modi was criticised over human rights after the US president Joe Biden said in Vietnam that he raised the issues over human rights and free press in India during his meeting with Modi. Earlier in June 2023, former US president Barack Obama said he on Modi that "if you don’t protect the rights of ethnic minorities in India, there is a strong possibility that India would at some point start pulling apart".

Modi and Donald Trump, the US President had a close friendly relationship during Trump's first term (2017-2021). Both visited each others countries and attended huge rallies in Houston and Ahmedabad respectively.The relationship between the two has cooled down during Trump's second term which began in January 2025.Very high tariffs on India has been one reason, the other has been Trump's insistence that he brokered peace between India and Pakistan to stop their military conflict of May 2025. India vehemently denied that Trump had any role in negotiating the cease fire.Some analysts have linked the firmness of India’s response to the importance placed on maintaining Mr. Modi’s image as a strong and decisive leader. Although Trump imposed tariffs on all countries of the world in April 2025, he singled out India for particularly high punitive rate of 50% for buying Russian oil. A distinctive feature of Modi’s unconventional diplomatic style has been hugging foreign leaders in public settings.These embraces have been carefully deployed as instruments of signaling trust, and personal rapport. Modi’s hugs with leaders such as Russian President Vladimir Putin, French President Emmanuel Macron, Israeli prime minister Benjamin Netanyahu, and US President Donald Trump exemplify this approach. Modi, however, has been selective in these gestures, for example, he has never embraced the Chinese leader Xi Jinping which observers say signifies caution and distance.

=== Electoral popularity ===
Modi has represented Varanasi in the Lok Sabha since 2014. He won the seat by huge margins in 2014 and 2019, however in 2024 the margin was much smaller than these two previous elections. Although building of the Ayodhya temple is considered an important accomplishment for Modi, the BJP lost the Faizabad constituency in the 2024 Lok Sabha election. The constituency includes five Vidhan sabha seats with four of them in Ayodhya district.

== Architectural and cultural projects ==
During his long political career as the chief minister of Gujarat and later as the prime minister, Modi initiated many notable architectural projects that will leave for him an enduring legacy lasting centuries. These include the colossal statue of Vallabhbhai Patel, the New Parliament building, Kashi Vishwanath Corridor, Bharat Mandapam, and the construction of the Ayodhya Ram temple. Modi's critics see in these projects an underlining theme of diminishing or erasing the legacy of previous rulers including that of the Islamic, British, and also of the post-1947 Congress party governments . He has presided at the ground breaking ceremony or the inauguration of all these projects.He also consented to a stadium in Ahmedabad being named after him as Narendra Modi Stadium.

== Criticism and controversies ==
Modi has been a polarising figure in both political and social circles. Under Modi's tenure, India has reportedly experienced democratic backsliding. (Note: Sources describing that India has experienced a backslide in democracy:) His administration introduced the Citizenship Amendment Act, Abrogation of Article 370, updated NRC in Assam which resulted in widespread protests across the country. Described as engineering a political realignment towards right-wing politics, Modi remains a figure of controversy domestically and internationally over his Hindu nationalist beliefs and his alleged role during the 2002 Gujarat riots, cited as evidence of an exclusionary social agenda. (Note: Sources discussing the controversy surrounding Modi.) Modi has often times been labelled as the "butcher of Gujarat" by domestic as well as foreign critics for his role in the 2002 Gujarat violence.

Reporters Without Borders in 2021 characterised Modi as a predator for curbing press freedom in India since 2014. In January 2023, Modi government banned the BBC documentary India: The Modi Question which criticised him.

== Journal and further reading ==
- Price, Lance (2015), The Modi Effect: Inside Narendra Modi's campaign to transform India, Hodder & Stoughton, ISBN 978-1-473-61088-0
- Marino, Andy (2014), Narendra Modi: A Political Biography, HarperCollins, ISBN 978-93-5136-217-3

== See also ==
- List of most-followed Twitter accounts
- List of most-followed Instagram accounts
