= India: The Modi Question =

2023 British documentary TV series

- Title card
- Genre: Documentary
- Country of origin: United Kingdom
- Original language: English
- No. of episodes: 2

Production
- Executive producers: Richard Cookson; Mike Radford
- Running time: 60 minutes (per episode)

Original release
- Network: BBC Two; BBC iPlayer
- Release: 17 January – 24 January 2023

India: The Modi Question is a 2023 two-part documentary series aired by BBC Two about the Indian Prime Minister Narendra Modi and his relationship with the Muslim minority in the country. The first part covers Modi's early political career and his role in the 2002 Gujarat violence, which occurred when he was the chief minister of Gujarat. It discusses documents found by the BBC, including a UK government report stating that the violence in Gujarat showed "all the hallmarks of an ethnic cleansing". The second part examines the activities of Modi's administration following his first re-election in 2019. It covers a series of controversial policies, including the revocation of Kashmir's autonomy and a new citizenship law. It also depicts the violent response to protests against the new laws, and the aftermath of the 2020 Delhi riots.

The Government of India banned the documentary from being screened, describing it as "hostile propaganda and anti-India garbage", and asked social media sites to take down snippets of the documentary shared by users. In response to the government's ban, the BBC said that the documentary had been researched "rigorously", and that it depicted a "wide range of voices", including the opinions of figures within Modi's Bharatiya Janata Party. The ban was frequently circumvented, and several student organisations held screenings in various parts of the country. The ban was criticised by opposition politicians as censorship, and described as an assault on freedom of the press by commentators and human rights groups.

== Background ==
Anti-Muslim violence occurred in the Indian state of Gujarat in 2002. Over one thousand people were killed, most of them Muslim, and 150,000 people were displaced. The violence followed the deaths of Hindu pilgrims on a train in Godhra, for which the state's Muslim minority was blamed. The incident was among the worst religious violence since India became an independent country in 1947. Narendra Modi, a member of the Hindu-nationalist Bharatiya Janata Party (BJP), was at the time the chief minister of Gujarat. His administration is considered complicit in the violence, or otherwise criticised for its management of the crisis. A Special Investigation Team appointed by the Supreme Court of India found no evidence to initiate prosecution proceedings against Modi personally.

Modi's role in the violence remains a source of controversy. After the BJP won the 2014 Indian general election and Modi was appointed prime minister, Indian Muslims have been the target of increased violence, on which Modi has largely not commented. The policies of the Modi administration have been seen as discriminatory toward India's Muslim minority, and as entrenching a right-wing Hindu-nationalist image of the country. Reporters Without Borders says that press freedom in the country has declined, and that the government has shut down criticism of it on social media. The Modi administration has often put pressure on Twitter to remove tweets the government perceives as critical of Modi or the BJP.

== Content ==
The first segment of the documentary, approximately an hour in length, covered Modi's early political career in the BJP, his appointment as chief minister of Gujarat in 2001, and his role in the 2002 anti-Muslim violence. It discussed documents found by the BBC, which showed that Modi's conduct was criticised at the time by diplomats and the Government of the United Kingdom. These include a report stating that the violence in Gujarat showed "all the hallmarks of an ethnic cleansing". The documents also cited police officers who stated that the police were prevented from aiding Muslim rape victims by pressure from the state government, and noted religious bias in how relief funds were distributed. Jack Straw, at the time the UK Foreign Secretary, is depicted saying that there were "serious claims" that Modi was actively restricting the activities of the police, and also "tacitly encouraging the Hindu extremists".

The second part, released on 24 January 2023, and also an hour long, examines the activities of Modi's administration following his re-election to a second term as prime minister of India in 2019. It examines a series of controversial policies, including the revocation of Kashmir's autonomy in 2019 and a new citizenship law. It depicts the violent response by security forces to protests against the new laws, and interviews the family members of people who died in the 2020 Delhi riots.

== Release and reaction ==
The first part of the two-part documentary was released by the BBC on 17 January 2023, and the second part on 24 January. It was not scheduled to be broadcast in India. The Indian Ministry of Information and Broadcasting described the documentary as propaganda, stated that it lacked objectivity, and "reflected a colonial mindset." A government minister stated that watching the documentary was treasonous. It was later banned in India, with the government invoking a 2021 law that increased its power to censor social media. Twitter and YouTube blocked posts linking to the documentary on their platforms following demands from the Indian government. The BBC acted to restrict the content on YouTube on copyright grounds and invoked DMCA to obtain a removal of a copy of the first part of the documentary from the Internet Archive. The government ban on the documentary has been frequently circumvented; clips from the documentary circulated on WhatsApp, Telegram, and Twitter, and VPNs were used to circumvent the ban. Commentators argued that the ban had drawn more attention to the documentary than it would otherwise have received, a phenomenon known as the Streisand effect. The ban was challenged in the Supreme Court of India. The court agreed on 3 February to hear petition by N. Ram, Mahua Moitra and Prashant Bhushan. (Note: Case Number (W.P.(C) No. 000116 – / 2023). Next court hearing scheduled in second week of January 2025.) Right-wing Hindu-nationalist groups also petitioned the Supreme Court to ban the BBC altogether; the court described the petition as "absolutely meritless", and rejected it. In March, the Assam Legislative Assembly, majority-controlled by the BJP, adopted a resolution put forward by the BJP MLA Bhubon Pegu, who alleged that the documentary raised doubts over Indian press freedom, the country's judicial system and the government, seeking an action against the BBC.

Screenings of the documentary were organised in late January by a Fraternity Movement students' group at Hyderabad Central University and the Democratic Youth Federation of India (DYFI) screened it in various parts of Kerala. Discussing its decision, DYFI stated: "Let people see the fascist face of the Sangh Parivar outfits. We will go ahead with the plan and more screenings will be done at other places also in the coming days." The Indian Youth Congress said that it too would screen the documentary in Kerala. The Jawaharlal Nehru University Students' Union also decided to screen the documentary. However, electricity and internet access to the room where the screening was to take place were cut by university authorities, leading to students streaming the documentary on their cell phones. After students at Jamia Millia University planned a screening, at least a dozen students were arrested, and the university entrances blocked. Witnesses stated that policemen with riot gear and tear gas had been sent into the university campus. The All India Students Association also screened the documentary in late January, with students attending from several colleges in Bangalore including Christ College, Indian Institute of Science, and Azim Premji University. The documentary was screened at the Parliament House in Australia by lawmakers and activists, during Modi's Australia trip in May 2023 to meet the Australian Prime Minister Anthony Albanese.

The ban on India: The Modi Question was described as an assault on freedom of the press by independent commentators, human rights groups, and opposition parties. Trinamool Congress leaders Derek O'Brien and Mahua Moitra, who tweeted video links to the documentary, criticised the move as censorship. The Guardian wrote that the ban on the documentary had occurred during a period of restricted press freedom in India, during which journalists had experienced harassment by the government and the judiciary. According to Human Rights Watch (HRW), the ban was an example of the harsh treatment of religious minorities under Modi's administration. HRW stated that the government under Modi had often used "draconian" laws to silence critics of the government. Slate described the ban as an example of "pervasive" hostility to freedom of the press and censorship of criticism. In response to the first part of the documentary, more than three hundred Indian former judges, bureaucrats, and soldiers released a statement which criticised the BBC for "unrelenting hostility" towards India. More than five hundred Indian scholars signed a petition criticising the ban, stating that it "violates our rights, as Indians, to access and discuss important information about our society and government". A New York Times editorial described the ban as the most recent example of the Modi government's suppression of press freedom.

The BBC's offices in Mumbai and New Delhi were the targets of searches by the Income Tax Department of India in February 2023. The searches began on 14 February, and continued for three days. Phones and laptops belonging to employees were searched. The searches were seen by commentators as being in retaliation for the documentary, and received condemnation from the Editors Guild of India, a nonprofit organisation of journalists promoting press freedom, Amnesty International India, and opposition parties. Reporters Without Borders said that the Indian tax department raids "have all the appearance of a reprisal" and denounced the "government’s attempts to clamp down on independent media." Supporters of Modi protested outside the BBC headquarters on London's Portland Place. The BBC was also sued by a non-profit organisation from Gujarat, which claimed the documentary defamed India.

== Reception ==
A review of India: The Modi Question in the Deccan Herald was positive, stating that the documentary had notably given space to a variety of opinions, including those of BJP members. It described the portrayal of the Gujarat violence as "comprehensive", and called the documentary "sharp". However, it stated that the documentary had fallen short in assessing other shortcomings of the Modi administration, and in understanding the links between religious majoritarianism and gender and caste. Political scientist Christophe Jaffrelot, among the scholars interviewed in the documentary, stated in an interview that the BBC had produced an "incredibly rigorous" piece of work.

A commentary in The News Minute was critical, stating that while the documentary had "interviewed the best voices", it had failed to uncover substantive new ground, and therefore allowed the Modi administration to "use the films for one more round of propaganda – painting themselves as victims". The author wrote that the first segment failed to interrogate open questions about the Godhra train burning. She was more positive about the second segment, but criticised it for not being sufficiently bold, particularly with its footage of Hindu extremists fomenting violence and of Muslims being beaten by the police during the 2020 Delhi riots.

Discussing the first segment of the documentary, a commentary in the Telegraph noted that the majority of the narrative covered the well-documented history of the Rashtriya Swayamsevak Sangh, Modi's career, and the Gujarat violence, with the only new material being British government reports. The author criticized the documentary for failing to interrogate why Western governments were willing to engage with Modi when documents in their position called him a violator of human rights, an opinion echoed by The News Minute review. The author was also critical of the ban on the documentary, stating that any criticism of Modi and the Sangh Parivar was being derided as "colonial" by these same organisations even though they had acted as raj-toadies during the colonial period and did "precious little to remove colonialism from India".

== See also ==
- Final Solution, a 2004 documentary on the 2002 Gujarat violence
