= Tikri, Tundla =

Village in Uttar Pradesh, India

Tikri
- Village
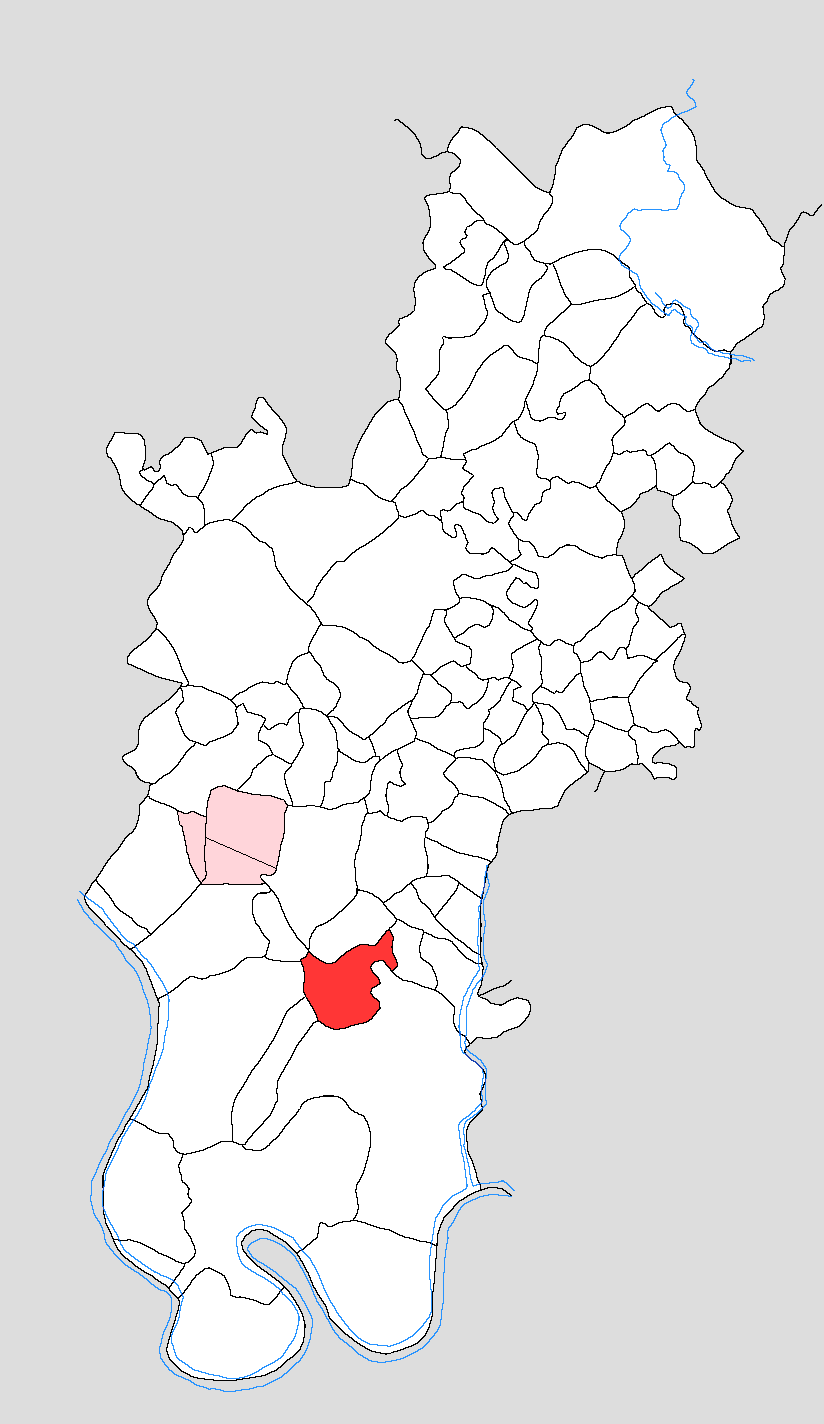
- Map showing Tikri in Tundla block

- Location in Uttar Pradesh, India
- Coordinates: 27.17572°N 78.27335°E
- Country: India
- State: Uttar Pradesh
- District: Firozabad
- Tehsil: Tundla

Area
  - Total: 4.37 km^{2} (1.69 sq mi)

Population (2011)
  - Total: 5,216
  - Density: 1,190/km^{2} (3,090/sq mi)
- Time zone: UTC+5:30 (IST)

Tikri (Ṭikrī) is a village in Tundla block of Firozabad district, Uttar Pradesh. As of 2011, it has a population of 5,216, in 857 households.

== Demographics ==
As of 2011, Tikri had a population of 5,216, in 857 households. This population was 54.1% male (2,822) and 45.9% female (2,394). The 0-6 age group numbered 866 (442 male and 424 female), making up 16.6% of the total population. 1,185 residents were members of Scheduled Castes, or 22.7% of the total.

The 1981 census recorded Tikri (as "Tikari") as having a population of 3,219 people (1,773 male and 1,446 female), in 544 households and 536 physical houses.

The 1961 census recorded Tikri as comprising 3 hamlets, with a total population of 2,250 people (1,201 male and 1,049 female), in 350 households and 223 physical houses. The area of the village was given as 1,047 acres.

== Infrastructure ==
As of 2011, Tikri had 3 primary schools; it did not have any healthcare facilities. Drinking water was provided by hand pump; there were no public toilets. The village had a public library but no post office; there was at least some access to electricity for all purposes. Streets were made of both kachcha and pakka materials.
