= Tikri, Gurugram =

Village in Haryana, India

Tikri
- village
- delhi india Tikri (India) Tikri (Asia)
- Coordinates: 28°25′12″N 77°2′10″E
- Country: India
- State: Haryana
- District: Gurugram district

Population
  - Total: 1,100

Languages
  - Official: Hindi
- Time zone: UTC+5:30 (IST)
- PIN: 122101
- Vehicle registration: HR
- Website: haryana.gov.in

Tikri is a mid-sized village located in the NH 248A Sohna Road Sector 48 in the Gurgaon district of the Indian state of Haryana. It has a population of about 1100 people living in around 500 households. There are mostly 'Yadav' Community. Its pin code is 122101. It comes in Municipal Corporation Gurgaon.
