= Freedom of the press in India =

Constitutionally protected fundamental right

Freedom of the press in India is legally protected as a fundamental right under Article 19(1)(a) of the constitution of India, while the sovereignty, national integrity, and moral principles are generally protected by the law of India to maintain a hybrid legal system for independent journalism. In India, media bias or misleading information is restricted under the certain laws on grounds listed in the Article 19(2) of the constitution.

Nevertheless, freedom of the press in India is subject to certain restrictions, such as defamation law, a lack of protection for whistleblowers, barriers to information access and constraints caused by public and government hostility to journalists. The press, including print, television, radio, and internet are nominally amended to express their concerns under the selected provisions such as Article-19 (which became effective from 1950), though it states freedom of "occupation, trade or business" and "freedom of speech and expression" without naming "press" in clause "a" and "g". The article allows a journalist or media industries to cover any story and bring it to the audiences without impacting the national security of the country.

To protect the intellectual, moral, and fundamental rights of the citizens, the government has taken several countermeasures to combat circulating fake news and restricting objectionable contents across the multiple platforms. The law of India prohibits spreading or publishing fake news through social or mass media, and could lead to imprisonment of a journalist or newspaper ban.

== Overview ==
In 2023, India's ranking slipped from 150 in 2022 to 161, out of 180 countries, in terms of press freedom according to the Reporters Without Borders' Press Freedom Index, with the organization stating that the situation for journalists was "very serious" in the country. India's global index rank has declined for several reasons, such as targeting of journalists including physical abuse, intimidation, prejudice and murder, and restrictions imposed on news media, particularly censorship in Kashmir and conflict in Jammu and Kashmir which has been a subject of dispute between India and Pakistan. The Ministry of Information and Broadcasting criticized the report published by the Reporters Without Borders in 2020 citing "the surveys portray a bad picture about freedom of press in India" and the index has also been criticized by Indian news outlets such as The Hindu to portray press freedom in India as comparable to absolute dictatorships like Turkey and occupied state of Palestine.

A report by Clooney foundation for justice, National Law University, Delhi, and Columbia Law School published an analysis of 423 criminal cases against journalists ranging from 2012-2022, finding at least 40% of journalists being arrested, 90% of cases registered having multiple offense, 65% of a subset of 244 cases having relevant data marked not completed as of 2023, 40% of which had not even started police investigation, with only 16 cases (6%) seeing a concluded trial. Of 427 journalists, 60 had more than one cases, with 36 of them having multiple cases relating to the same incident. While 65% of metropolitan based journalists were able to secure interim protection from arrest, only 3% of small town journalists were able to do the same, also correlating to a higher arrest rate of 58% compared to 24% in metropolitan cities. The report recognized that vaguely worded and broad laws were used against journalists and that authorities do not generally involve careful consideration of the offense, but rather slap a wide range of offense against them. Observing 73% of interviewed journalists reporting negative impact on personal lives, the report criticized 'the process is the punishment' ethos surrounding such cases.

The Coalition of Women in Journalism documented 145 threats and intimidation against women, the third highest number of intimidation cases against female reporters. Committee to Protect Journalists’ 2019 Global Impunity Index, records that India comes 13th in its list of countries where murderers of journalists do not face justice.

== History ==
In 1956, a private bill introduced by Feroz Gandhi called Parliamentary Proceedings became a crucial law in the history of Indian press freedom, but this law was repealed by the then Indian Prime Minister Indira Gandhi during the Emergency in 1975. As part of the Emergency, Indira Gandhi heavily restricted the press, banning all domestic and international news, expelling many foreign journalists and correspondents and revoking the accreditation of over 40 Indian reporters. Many historians believe that she was intimidated by the growing criticism of her government and feared that the press was supporting the movement started by Jayaprakash Narayan.

== Background ==
The constitution of India protects freedom of speech and freedom of the press, however, critics state that press freedom is restrained, and the government only encourages speech that supports it and the prevailing ruling party. Media reports in India that support the ruling party are criticized as being often one-sided and exaggerated, playing little or no role in gathering true information and providing propaganda on their platforms.

The media have consistently upheld the personality cult of the leaders since the country's formation. It reported on the activities of the leader, regularly reporting on their political campaigns, frequently including "advertisements" to ruling parties through radio, television and Newspaper display ads. In the current day, news journalism that shows bias in covering news favorable to the ruling BJP government is subject to criticism in the country, often discussed under a popularized name, Godi media, meaning 'lapdog media' as well as a play on words for the Indian prime minister, Narendra Modi. In 2020, the CMS Media Lab, a nonpartisanism subsidiary of the research organisation stated in its report that the prime minister of India, Modi, received 33.21% of the primetime news coverage during 2019 general election while the competitors' political parties such as Aam Aadmi Party led by Arvind Kejriwal received 10.31% media coverage and the Indian National Congress candidate Rahul Gandhi received 4.33% prime-time news telecast coverage, an aspect that is criticized for providing unfair advantage in their subsequent victory.

Journalists that covers the economic and political problems in the country, or criticize the government are sometimes subject to threats by government bodies utilizing colonial-era laws relating to sedition, defamation and anti-state activities, a tactic that has become increasingly common. Journalists critical of the government often suffer from criminal prosecutions, with India's colonial era sedition law, Section 124A of the Indian Penal Code often being cited by prosecutors. Under Unlawful Activities (Prevention) Act, (UAPA act) individuals accused of anti-state activities can be arrested without a trial and it also makes procuring bail difficult, allowing release to be delayed for years. The act is criticized for abysmally low conviction rate which is around 2%, with 97.5% of the people arrested under UAPA in 2016–2020, remained under prison awaiting trial. It has been used against journalists and is documented to be rapidly rising in the number of cases. The BJP government has been criticized for frequent and excessive misuse of act and has recorded 73 of 154 of documented cases in 2010–2020, being issued in BJP ruling states. The National Investigation Agency (NIA) has also been criticized to interrogate journalists, sometimes over an extended period of time, as an intimidation tactic.

Regulatory bodies can often enforce pressure on news media under influence of political power. For example, in February 2023, the government raided the offices of the BBC, accusing it of corruption and tax evasion, shortly after it aired a documentary (which the government banned) critical of Modi for his involvement in the alleged state-sponsored anti-Muslim violence in his home state of Gujarat, in 2002 during his chief-ministership. After the three day raid, the Enforcement Directorate ordered investigation on the BBC for violations of Foreign Exchange Management Act, which it was fined for in 2025. The Press Club of India (PCI), called the case a "clear cut case of vendetta" although government officials have denied connections to it. Newslaundry observed 44 cases involving journalists and media houses in a span of five years, 2018-2023, involving raids, money laundering cases and summons, 9 of which were linked to Income Tax Department, 15 to Enforcement Directorate and 20 to National Investigation Agency, which it criticized as a pattern of intimidation of press. Bobby Ghosh, resigned as the editor of the Hindustan Times, shortly after the Prime Minister Narendra Modi reportedly met Shobhana Bhartia, the owner of the newspaper. Ghosh had also started a crowdsourced hate crime tracker on the site, which was pulled shortly after. It was widely reported that the incident was result of pressure by ruling party members, however Ghosh declined to specify the reason and officials involved have denied any involvement. Several other instances of resignations under similar circumstances have raised question regarding pressure by political parties on news organizations in India.

The Modi government has also introduced several laws that give the government extraordinary power to control the media, including the Telecommunications Act, 2023, the Broadcasting Services (Regulation) Bill, 2023, and the Digital Personal Data Protection Act (DPDP), 2023. The government is also criticized for undermining Right to Information Act (RTI Act), 2005 where chief positions in the concerned regulatory body, Central Information Commission (CIC), appointed are often from favorable political background sometimes bypassing standard process, regularly withholds information citing handful of Supreme Court and High Court judgements, long and unjustified delays in the process, and lack of accountability or even use of existing accountability measures. The recently implemented DPDP Act expands definition of "personal information" to limit disclosure of information under RTI, an aspect criticized to further limit RTI act. Journalists and activists involved in application of RTI for their investigation are often harassed, abducted or even murdered. Use of laws regarding right to be forgotten pose as emerging new methods through which individuals take action of censorship as well as to hide publicly available legal documents.

The government also enforces content blocking and censorship, using Section 69A of the Information Technology Act (IT Act), 2000 which is increasingly used to target news organizations and takedown content. The IT act is also subject to amendments over the years that grant extraordinary powers to governing agencies such as Ministry of Information Broadcasting (MIB) or Ministry of Electronics and Information Technology (MEITy). Internet censorship is facilitated through MEITy's sahyog portal which is used to send takedown requests to various platforms which are forced to comply in removal of content within as little as 3 hours since 2026 IT act amendments. Various news organizations and journalists are critical of these developments, including US trade representative (USTR) which oversees US trade relations which has been critical of India's stringent takedown requirements and has termed them as "impractical and politically motivated", a pattern it has been critical of since 2021.

Indian news media is primarily funded by advertising revenue which the government forms a majority contribution. The government enforces pressure on offending news journals through removal of advertising funding or cooperation with organized events. News media landscape in India also shows centralization of media ownership. Indian billionaires, Gautam Adani led Adani group's acquisition of NDTV news media and Mukesh Ambani's takeover of India's largest news broadcaster, Network18, is criticized as two "oligarchs" stifling critical journalism and independent news broadcasters by various journalists and prominent western media outlets. Media bias due to lack of diversity in journalistic positions is also a subject of criticism.

In Jammu and Kashmir, termed as “world’s most repressive spots for the press” by journalism watchdog organization International Press Institute (IPI), due to special interest on the region to secure border threats and terrorism threats, special laws concerning the region provide more authority and control over news and reporting from the region. Under Public Safety Act, authorities are allowed to detain people without evidence and judicial review which has been used to often interrogate journalists with some being charged and arrested over national security reportage and nominally defamatory news stories involving government which is criticized as a retaliation for their investigative work by organizations such as Amnesty International. India also shuts down internet in the region frequently, making it the world's biggest offender of internet shutdowns for the fourth consecutive time in 2021, according to AccessNow. Indian media has been criticized for carrying media war during military conflicts, and expressing one-sided identification with vigorous support for their interests.

== Attacks on journalists ==
Reporters Without Borders, states that followers of Hindutva are attempting to censor claimed "anti-national" thoughts through coordinated hate campaigns that sometimes involves death threats by Hindutva followers against journalists critical of Hindutva, emboldened by arrest and persecution of journalists and individuals without proper basis. In one instance described as the most high-profile murder of a journalist in recent years by the BBC, Gauri Lankesh, a proponent of secularism and an important figure criticizing right-wing Hindu extremism, was shot dead by members of a Hindu nationalist group in 2017, prompting nationwide protests and outrage over her death.

A report stated that between 2014 and 2019, 40 journalists were killed and at least 198 severe attacks on journalists were reported, of which, 36 occurred in 2019 alone. Several journalists such as Sagarika Ghose, Ravish Kumar have said that they were subjected to harassment, intimidation including death and rape threats when they were skeptical of the Bharatiya Janata Party government.

In January 2025, freelance journalist Mukesh Chandrakar was found murdered in Bijapur district, Chhattisgarh, after reporting on alleged corruption in a local road construction project. His body was discovered in a septic tank at the residence of a private contractor whom he had investigated. Authorities arrested multiple individuals, including some of Chandrakar's relatives, in connection with the crime. The incident drew condemnation from journalist associations and press freedom organizations, highlighting the increasing risks faced by investigative journalists in India, particularly those reporting on corruption and misconduct in remote regions. The International Federation of Journalists (IFJ) and the Committee to Protect Journalists (CPJ) urged the Indian government to ensure a thorough investigation and stronger protections for journalists working in high-risk environments.

== See also ==
- Godi media
- Editors Guild of India
- Censorship in India
- Internet censorship in India
- Freedom of the press in British India
- Freedom of expression in India
