= Premiership of Narendra Modi =

Period of the Government of India since 2014

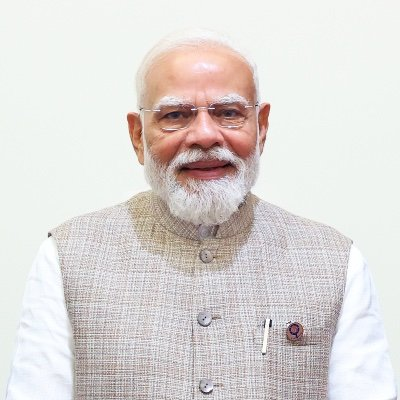
- Prime Minister of India Narendra Modi
- Premiership of Narendra Modi; 26 May 2014 – present
- Prime Minister: Narendra Modi
- Party: Bharatiya Janata Party
- First term 26 May 2014 – 30 May 2019
- Cabinet: First Modi ministry
- Election: 2014
- Appointed by: President Pranab Mukherjee
- Seat: Varanasi
- Second term 30 May 2019 – 9 June 2024
- Cabinet: Second Modi ministry
- Election: 2019
- Appointed by: President Ram Nath Kovind
- Seat: Varanasi
- Third term 9 June 2024 – Present
- Cabinet: Third Modi ministry
- Election: 2024
- Appointed by: President Droupadi Murmu
- Seat: Varanasi

The premiership of Narendra Modi began 26 May 2014 with his swearing-in as the prime minister of India at the Rashtrapati Bhavan. He succeeded Manmohan Singh of the Indian National Congress (INC).

In 2019, he was elected as the prime minister of India for a second term and sworn in at the Rashtrapati Bhavan on 30 May 2019. His second cabinet consisted of 54 ministers and initially had 51 ministers, which was expanded to 77 ministers during a reshuffle on 7 July 2021. Modi was sworn in for a third term as prime minister, heading a coalition government, on 9 June 2024.

His premiership has, to a considerable extent, embodied a high command culture. India has experienced significant democratic backsliding under his tenure. (Note: Sources: Brunkert, Lennart; Kruse, Stefan; Welzel, Christian (3 April 2019). "A tale of culture-bound regime evolution: the centennial democratic trend and its recent reversal". Democratization. 26 (3): 422–443. doi:10.1080/13510347.2018.1542430. ISSN 1351-0347. S2CID 148625260. Archived from the original on 10 October 2021.; Khaitan, Tarunabh (26 May 2020). "Killing a Constitution with a Thousand Cuts: Executive Aggrandizement and Party-state Fusion in India". Law & Ethics of Human Rights. 14 (1): 49–95. doi:10.1515/lehr-2020-2009. hdl:11343/241852. ISSN 2194-6531. S2CID 221083830.; "India Is 'One of the Worst Autocratisers in the Last 10 Years,' Says 2023 V-Dem Report". The Wire. 7 March 2023.; Blank, Jonah (8 August 2019). "India Just Put Democracy at Risk Across South Asia". The Atlantic.; Biswas, Soutik (16 March 2021). "'Electoral autocracy': The downgrading of India's democracy". BBC.; Sirnate, Vasundhara (27 November 2021). "The democratic backsliding of India". The Hindu. Archived from the original on 30 August 2022.; Bala, Sumathi (16 May 2024). "Modi's strongman rule raises questions about India's 'democratic decline' as he seeks a third term". CNBC.)

Modi is the longest serving non-Congress prime minister of India. In 2024, Modi became the first non-Congress leader to win three consecutive general elections and secure a third consecutive term as prime minister of India, with Jawaharlal Nehru being the only other person to do so. As of August 2025, Modi is the third longest serving prime minister of India, after Jawaharlal Nehru and Indira Gandhi in terms of number of days in office. His first cabinet consisted of 45 ministers, 25 fewer than the previous United Progressive Alliance (UPA) government. A total of 21 ministers were added to the council of ministers on 9 November 2014.

== Economic policies ==
=== Overall ===
The economic policies of Modi's government focused on privatisation and liberalization of the economy, based on a neoliberal framework. Modi liberalised India's foreign direct investment policies, allowing more foreign investment in several industries, including in defence and the railways.

The first eight years of Modi's premiership, India's GDP grew at an average rate of 5.5% compared to the rate of 7.03% under the previous government.

The level of income inequality increased significantly, while an internal government report said that in 2017, unemployment had increased to its highest level in 45 years. This was attributed to the 2016 demonetisation, which was an issuance of new banknotes in an effort to curtail the black market, as well as the effects of the Goods and Services Tax, the biggest tax reform in the country since independence.

One of the major impacts of Modi's economic reforms has been introduction of UPI payment service, an indigenous payment system that made India a leading nation in cashless transactions. UPI has visibly contributed to reduced corruption and increased financial inclusion.

=== Labour and employment ===
Modi's labour reforms received support from institutions such as the World Bank, but opposition from socialist and communist parties, scholars, and worker rights groups within the country. The labour laws also drew strong opposition from unions: on 2 September 2015, eleven of the country's largest unions went on strike, including one affiliated with the BJP. The strike was estimated to have cost the economy $3.7 billion. In 2025, Modi's government announced reforms to the country's labour laws.

=== Healthcare ===
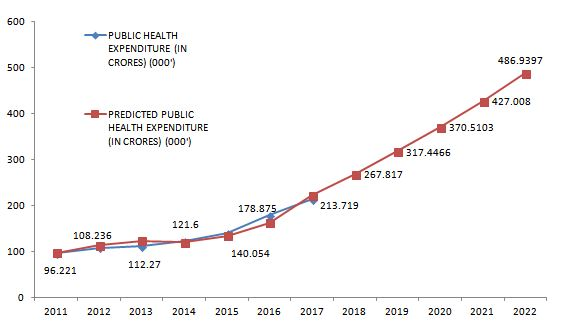
Forecasting public healthcare expenditure by Government of India

India's health budget increases under Modi's premiership have been criticised as disappointing despite new measures such as expanded health insurance, a national dialysis programme, and more government-run pharmacies offering low-cost generic medicines. While private healthcare welcomed these steps, public health experts expressed concerns that public healthcare funding remains inadequate, and that public health services were being outsourced to the private sector.

=== Public transportation ===
The government entered into significant agreements with General Electric and Alstom to supply India with 1,000 new diesel locomotives as part of a broader effort to reform the Indian railway system, which also encompassed privatisation initiatives.

In December 2015, the Modi administration signed an agreement with Japan to jointly develop a high-speed rail network connecting Mumbai and Ahmedabad.

Under his leadership, the Railway Budget was merged with the Union Budget of India. Additionally, the date for presenting the budget was changed from 28 February to 1 February, and the financial year was adjusted from July to April. Moreover, the distinction between planned and non-planned expenditure was abolished. The Modi government also dismantled the Foreign Investment Promotion Board (FIPB), which had been viewed as a barrier to foreign direct investments.

=== Other major reforms and policies ===
The government has increased the Budget for National Mission for Green India from Rs. 290 Crore($38,511,333.00 in USD) to 361.69 Crore($48,034,782.98 in USD). The public expenditure on education including technical education as a percentage of GDP for the year 2013-2014 was 4.44% which was later reduced to 4.35% in the year 2014-2015 and was later increased to 4.56% in the year 2015–2016 by Modi Government.

The government substantially increased the percentage of central revenue directly granted to states, while decreasing the amount granted through various central government programs. Overall, states' share of revenue increased marginally. The criteria upon which individual states' allocation was determined were changed, such that the revenue to 19 states increased, and that of 10 states decreased. Only one of the ten states was ruled by the BJP when the policy was enacted.

On 25 June 2015, Modi launched a program intended to develop 100 smart cities. The "Smart Cities" program is expected to bring IT companies an extra benefit of ₹20 billion (US$210 million). He also launched a "smart villages" initiative, under which villages would be given Internet access, clean water, sanitation, and low-carbon energy, with Members of Parliament overseeing the program's implementation. The program had a stated goal of at least 2,50 smart villages by 2019.

Give up LPG subsidy was a campaign launched by Modi in March 2015. It was aimed at motivating LPG users who can afford to pay the market price for LPG to voluntarily surrender their LPG subsidy. As at 23 April 2016 1 crore ( 10 million) people had voluntarily given up the subsidy. The surrendered subsidy is being used by the government to provide cooking gas connections to poor families in rural households free of cost. Maharashtra, Uttar Pradesh, Karnataka, Delhi and Tamil Nadu are the top five states to give up the subsidy.

=== Social welfare ===
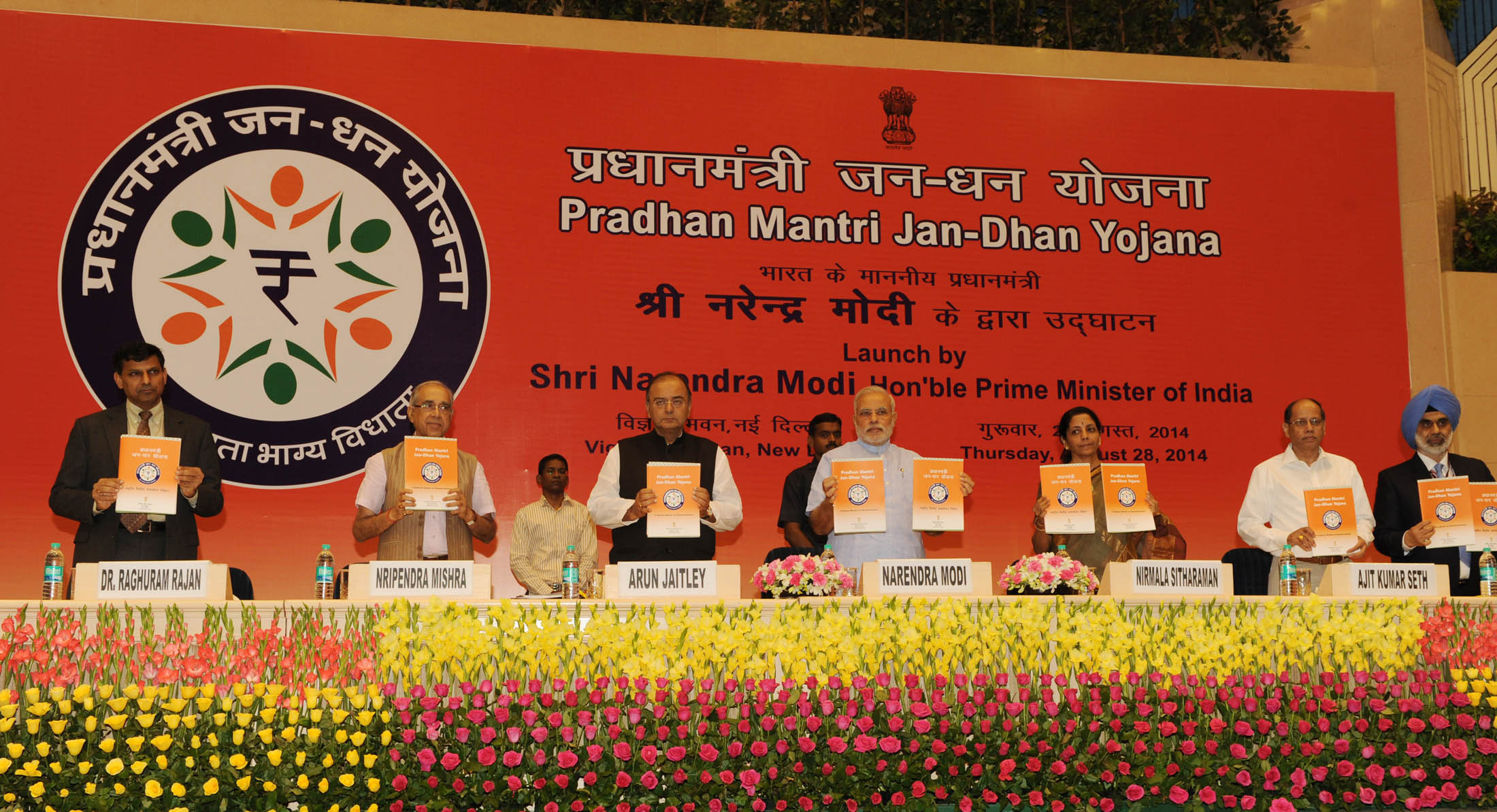
PM Modi launches the " Pradhan Mantri Jan Dhan Yojana"

Modi launched Pradhan Mantri Jan Dhan Yojana (PMJDY) in August 2014. The initiative aimed to create bank accounts and debit cards for 150 million families, and to allow them an overdraft of ₹5,000 (US$53) and accident insurance. After the launch, 125.4 million accounts were opened by January 2015. The scheme has failed to improve the economic prosperity across states. "Poor usage of financial services" and "a rise in the number of dormant accounts" have been cited as the limitations of the scheme, with 30% of accounts remaining dormant.

Narendra Modi launching the Pradhan Mantri MUDRA (Micro Units Development and Refinance Agency) Yojana.

Modi government launched the Pradhan Mantri Mudra Yojana (PMMY) in April 2015. Under this scheme, loans up to ₹1 million (US$11,000) are given for non-agricultural activities under the three categories: Shishu (loans up to ₹50,000 (US$530)); Kishore (loans from ₹50,000 (US$530) to ₹500,000 (US$5,300)) and Tarun (loans from ₹500,000 (US$5,300) to ₹1 million (US$11,000)). According to a report by the SKOCH Group, this scheme has generated 1.68 crore incremental jobs in the first two years until September 2017.

The Prime Minister, Modi launches Pradhan Mantri Awas Yojana – Gramin, in Agra, Uttar Pradesh.

In June 2015, Modi launched the "Housing for All By 2022" project, which intends to eliminate slums in India by building about 20 million affordable homes for India's urban poor. A total of 4,718 camps were held from 2014 to 2017, benefiting 6.40 lakh beneficiaries under Assistance to Disabled Persons for Purchase/Fitting of Aids/Appliances (ADIP) scheme, as compared to 37 camps from 2012 to 2014.

In 2019, a law was passed to provide 10% reservation to Economically weaker sections.

Modi also launched Pradhan Mantri Ujjwala Yojana (PMUY) on 1 May 2016 to distribute 50 million LPG connections to women of BPL families. A budgetary allocation of ₹800 billion (US$8.5 billion) was made for the scheme. In the first year of its launch, the connections distributed were 22 million against the target of 15 million. As of 23 October 2017, 30 million connections were distributed, 44% of which were given to families belonging to scheduled castes and scheduled tribes. The number crossed 58 million by December 2018.

The Prime Minister, Shri Narendra Modi at the launching ceremony of the 'Pradhan Mantri Ujjwala Yojana', at Ballia, Uttar Pradesh.jpg

In 2018 Union Budget of India, its scope was widened to include 80 million poor households. 21,000 awareness camps were conducted by oil marketing companies (OMC). The scheme led to an increase in LPG consumption by 56% in 2019 as compared to 2014.

== Hindutva ==
During the 2014 election campaign, Modi publicly expressed hopes for a tenure without communal violence. The BJP sought to identify itself with political leaders known to have opposed Hindu nationalism, including B. R. Ambedkar, Subhas Chandra Bose, and Ram Manohar Lohia. The campaign also featured BJP leaders in some states using rhetoric rooted in Hindutva, a far-right Hindu nationalist ideology.

PM Modi at Sri Arulmigu Ramanathaswamy Temple in Rameswaram, Tamil Nadu

Prime Minister Modi at Kashi Vishwanath Temple

Communal tensions were played upon especially in Uttar Pradesh and the states of Northeast India. A proposal for the controversial Uniform Civil Code was a part of the BJP's election manifesto. The BJP increasingly employed rhetoric rooted in Hindutva during the 2019 and 2024 elections.

PM releases a specially designed commemorative postage stamp and coin during the centenary celebrations of the Rashtriya Swayamsevak Sangh (RSS) in New Delhi on October 01, 2025.

Several state governments headed by the BJP have enacted policies aligned with Hindutva after the election of Modi as prime minister. The government of Haryana made changes to its education policy that introduced Hindu religious elements into the curriculum. External affairs minister Sushma Swaraj suggested after the election that the Bhagavad Gita, an ancient Hindu scripture, be adopted as India's "national book". There has been an increase in the activities of a number of other Hindu nationalist organisations, sometimes with the support of the government. The incidents included a campaign against "Love Jihad", a Hindu religious conversion programme conducted by members of the Rashtriya Swayamsevak Sangh (RSS), a far-right Hindutva paramilitary organisation, alongside other organisations such as the Hindu Mahasabha, a right-wing to far-right Hindu nationalist political party. The attempts at religious conversion have been described by the Vishva Hindu Parishad (VHP) and other organisations involved with them as attempts at "reconversion" from Islam or Christianity. However, no evidence was found by police in many states to support the "love-jihad" narrative. There have been a number of reports of intimidation or coercion of the subjects during these attempts. There were additional incidents of violence targeted at religious minorities by Hindu nationalists. Modi refused to remove a government minister from her position after a popular outcry resulted from her referring to religious minorities as "bastards". Commentators have suggested, however, that the violence was perpetrated by radical Hindu nationalists to undercut the authority of Modi.

The Modi administration appointed Yellapragada Sudershan Rao, who had previously been associated with the RSS, chairperson of the Indian Council of Historical Research. In reaction to his appointment, other historians and former members of the ICHR, including those sympathetic to the ruling party, questioned his credentials as a historian. Several stated that the appointment was part of an agenda of cultural nationalism.

On 8 January 2019, India's lower house of parliament approves a bill that would grant residency and citizenship rights to non-Muslim immigrants who entered the country before 2014 – including Hindus, Sikhs, Buddhists, Jains, Parsis and Christians from three Muslim-majority countries (Bangladesh, Pakistan and Afghanistan) – and make them eligible for Indian citizenship. The Bill excludes Muslims.

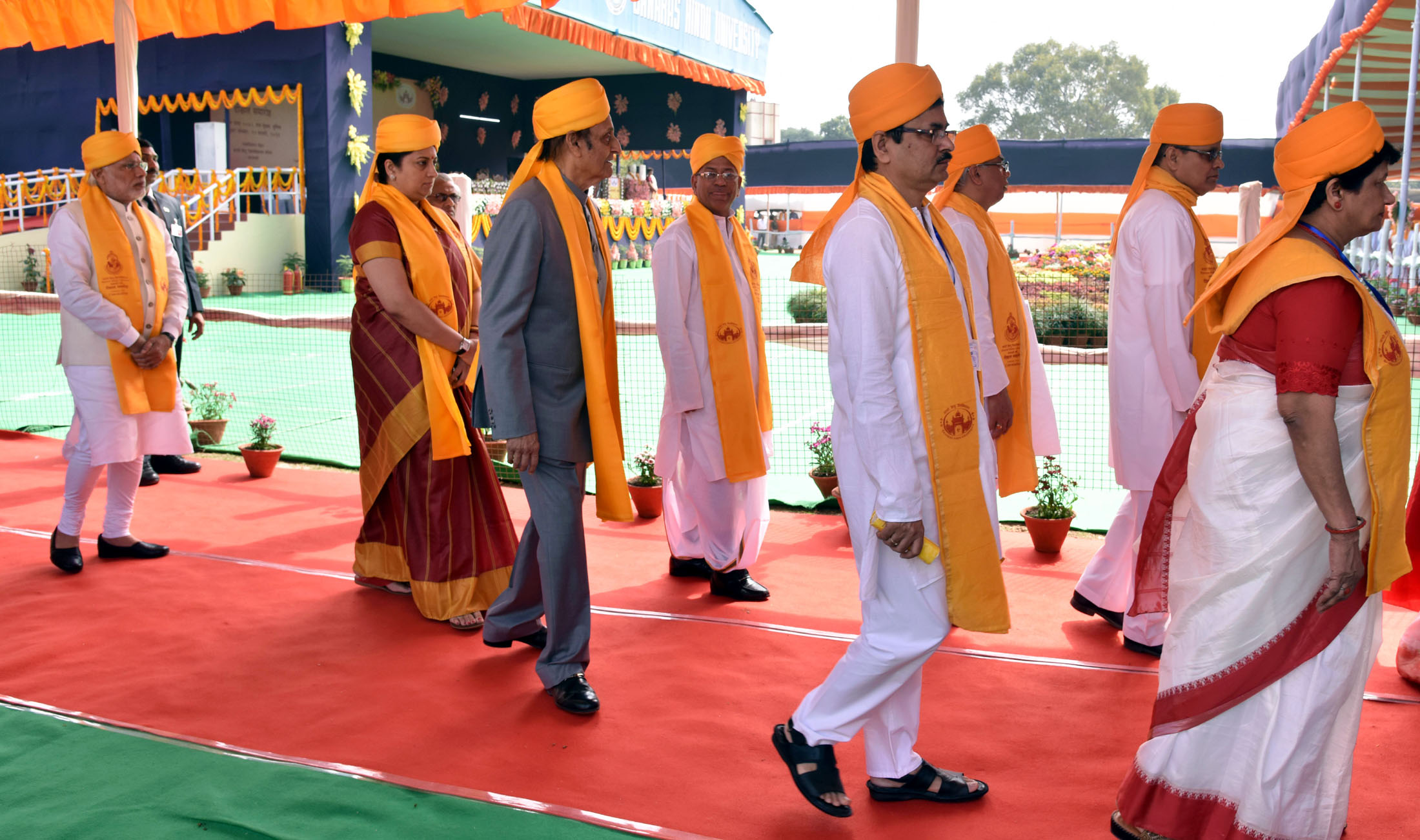
Modi at the Banaras Hindu University in Varanasi.

On 6 August 2019, the Supreme Court of India passed resolution on creation of Ram Mandir on the disputed land of Ayodhya. The verdict also stated to provide 5 acres (20,000 m^{2}) for creation of a mosque on another part of the land. The land was given to the Sunni Waqf Board. On 5 August 2020, Narendra Modi attended the Bhoomipujan at Ayodhya. He became the first prime minister to visit Ram Janmabhoomi and Hanuman Garhi.

On 8 March 2019, the Kashi Vishwanath Corridor Project was launched by Narendra Modi to ease access between the temple and the Ganges River, creating a wider space to prevent overcrowding. On 13 December 2021, Modi inaugurated the corridor with a sacred ceremony.

According to Sumantra Bose, a London School of Economics professor, since being reelected in May 2019, Modi's government has "moved on to larger-scale, if still localized, state-sanctioned mob violence".

Under Modi's tenure, bulldozers have been used in many Muslim neighborhoods for demolitions of homes, shops and other property owned by Muslims accused in crimes or riots. BJP officials have defended the use of demolitions as they say properties are illegal. In Delhi, the demolition drive even violated the Supreme Court order which asked the authorities to immediately stop the demolitions.

== Democratic backsliding ==
Countries autocratising (red) or democratising (blue) substantially and significantly (2010–2020) according to the V-Dem Institute; the remainder are substantially unchanged.

Democratic backsliding refers to a political process in which a democratic system increasingly deteriorates into an autocratic regime. This transition is characterised by the erosion of democratic norms, the suppression of mechanisms that constrain the exercise of political power, and the centralisation of authority. Since Modi came to power in 2014, various studies conducted by non-governmental organisations, have confirmed the persistent decline in democracy indexes in that now India is widely considered to be gradually moving towards an "electoral autocracy". This is credibly supported by the Swedish organisation International Institute for Democracy and Electoral Assistance categorising India as an "electoral autocracy" in March 2021. This democratic backsliding has been driven primarily by Modi and the Hindu nationalist BJP. Akhilesh Pillalamarri of the Diplomat has argued that the "cultural and social trends [in India today] are not necessarily evidence of democratic backsliding, but are rather evidence of social norms in India that are illiberal toward speech, individual expression, and criticism."

In 2023, the Modi administration issued a notification constituting a high-level committee on One Nation, One Election, a proposal aimed to synchronise all elections in the country either on a single day or within a specific time frame. In September 2024, the bill for One Nation, One Election was approved by the Modi Cabinet. The government also passed the One Hundred and Sixth Amendment of the Constitution of India, which sought to allocate 33 percent of the seats in the directly elected Lok Sabha, state legislative assemblies and Delhi legislative assembly for women. However, in April 2026, an amendment did not pass due to concerns from opposition parties about the timing of its implementation and the proposed delimitation process.Although his party won West Bengal with a special majority winning 208 out of 294 seats as well as retained Assam in 2026 after the failed delimitation attempt.

=== Statistics ===
In the past decade, India has seen a decline in many global freedom indices. In 2020, India reported drop in the rankings in the Human Freedom Index, Global Economic Freedom Index, Internet Freedom Index, Human Development Report. India also saw a decline in press freedom, falling from 133 out of 180 countries in 2016 to 161 in 2023, in the Press Freedom Index published by Reporters Without Borders. India ranked 46th out of 165 independent countries and two territories in the Democracy Index published by the Economist Intelligence Unit (EIU) for 2021. In 2021, V-Dem Institute downgraded India from a 'flawed democracy' to an 'electoral autocracy'.

=== Factors contributing to democratic backsliding ===
According to international think-tank Chatham House amongst many factors, such as its control of the media, corruption, and abuse of power, the BJP seems to be on the path to becoming an illiberal pseudo-democracy similar to Turkey or Russia. Their attempt at developing the country, has now been increasingly polarised, eroding the citizens' trust in the states' institutions and basic democratic foundations like the rule of law.

=== Defiance, defamation, and counterterrorism to silence critics ===
If a public source was to criticise the rule of Modi or the BJP, they would be punished through harassment, prosecution, raided by tax income officers, or put under surveillance. This was to restrict the denunciation of the leader, however this would then deny the public of the free flow of information that essentially enables them to assess the work of the government and make political choices. Therefore, the public would not be able to hold the government accountable for their actions. Cases of sedition (conduct or speech inciting people to rebel against the authority of a state) had risen by 28% between 2010 and 2021; Of these cases filed against citizens for criticising the government, 96% were filed after Modi came to power in 2014. Not only were opposing press silenced, but media coverage on the television was highly influenced by Modi, with a study of RepublicTV from 2017 to 2020 finding that coverage would be "consistently biased in favour of the Modi government and its policies.". Moreover, Mukesh Ambani, a businessman with close ties to Modi, directly controls media outlets followed by at least 800 million Indians. This heavily dictates the media shown to the population, often being able to convey propaganda benefitting the BJP.

As well as subduing the media, Modi has been able to manipulate the Supreme Court, despite a tradition of an independent judiciary which would maintain effective checks and balances. The government has been able to abuse their executive power which is supposedly overtly embedded into the constitutional order and institutional structure. The Constitution establishes a political system designed to advancing executive power and supports coercive legislation at their disposal, if there are cases of absent fundamental plumbing, it can be created through amendments. However, the same concentration of power would be available if a leader is able to muster a legislative majority.

This overall, leads to a democratic backslide due to the lack of criticising information available to the public to view, therefore their opinions are likely to be manipulated in favour of Modi and the BJP.

=== Use of investigative agencies ===
==== Against political opponents ====
Central investigative agencies like the Enforcement Directorate and the Central Bureau of Investigation have been instrumentalised for political gains by the Modi government and used against their political opposition. The investigative agencies provide inputs about the opposition's vulnerabilities with the Modi government, and intimidate them with raids. On one occasion, IT officers came from a car with BJP sticker. The government has put opposition politicians under house arrest and jailed them in order to prevent them from canvassing or participating in protest movements such as in the cases of TDP politician Nara Lokesh and former finance minister P. Chidambaram. Jaffrelot finds similarities between the way the Modi administration has used investigative agencies, and the use of income-tax raids as a tool of intimidation by the government of Indira Gandhi during the Emergency. A pattern of closing cases against political opponents who defect to the ruling Bharatiya Janata Party has also emerged. The charges of Saradha scam were dropped against Himanta Biswa Sarma when he joined the BJP. Similar cases of corruption against Ajit Pawar, Mukul Roy, Y.S. Chowdary and Harshvardhan Patil were also dropped when they defected to the BJP.

The timing of raids on the opposition leaders is often made to coincide with elections or other political consequences.

According to the data shared by the Union government in the parliament in July 2022, the Enforcement Directorate (ED) has registered 5,422 cases under the Prevention of Money Laundering Act, 2002, but only 23 persons have been convicted – less than 0.5% out of which 5,310 cases were under the premiership of Narendra Modi – a 27 times rise . The government data on convictions by the Income Tax Department is also abysmal. In 6 months between 2018 and 2019, the Income Tax Department had raided the offices of 16 politicians of which 15 belonged to opposition parties. Among the politicians booked, arrested, raided or questioned by the Central Bureau of Investigation under the first eight years of Modi's government, 95% were from the opposition. BJP leaders have boasted about the impunity they get from the investigative agencies and threatening rebels in their party with raids, adds further to the allegations of misuse of investigative agencies under the premiership of Modi.

=== Crackdown on media ===
The investigative agencies have also targeted independent and media houses with raids. Offices of Dainik Bhaskar were raided by IT department months after the media house exposed the handling of the COVID-19 pandemic by the government. BBC India offices were raided by income tax officers a month after they released a documentary on Modi's role in the 2002 Gujarat riots. Other media houses that were targeted include Bennett Coleman and Company Limited, India Today Group, Kashmir Times, The Quint, The News Minute, Theo Connect (parent of HW News Network), Newslaundry, Bharat Samachar, NewsClick, Greater Kashmir, Kashmir Walla.

Journalist Sidheeq Kappan was put in jail for 850 days under the stringent UAPA by UP police and money laundering case by the ED on his way to Hathras gang rape and murder case. Journalist Manash Baruah from Guwahati was summoned by the NIA asking him to discontinue phone calls with activist Akhil Gogoi. At the time of farmers' protests, NIA summoned Gurpatwant Singh Pannun because of his reporting on farmer protests was different from mainstream media.

=== Extension of term of chief of investigative agencies ===
Modi' government extended the tenure of ED director Sanjay Kumar Mishra, who was set to leave the post in November 2020, to one more year so that he remains the director till November 2021. In September 2021, the Supreme Court directed the centre to not give any further extension to Mishra after his tenure ends in November 2021. The government followed by passing two ordinances giving itself power to extend the tenure of chiefs of ED and CBI for three years after their two-year tenure is completed, and Mishra's tenure was extended till November 2022. The move to allow extension of tenures to up to five years by the government was seen by the critics as an attack on independence of agencies.

On 8 May 2023, The Supreme Court's amicus curiae K.V. Viswanathan told the court that the extensions granted to Mishra were "invalid" and the changes brought by the government in the law "should be scrapped in the interest of democracy", when the court was hearing petitions challenging the third extension of Mishra.

=== Suppression of data ===
Modi's government delayed the release of data on unemployment in 2019. Two members of National Statistical Commission resigned in protest as the release was approved in December 2018 by the commission. The government released the data in May 2019 after the general elections. The government delayed farmer suicide data from 2016 by three years. Before the 2019 general elections, the government did not release data on consumer expenditure, GDP growth, deaths due to lynching, and caste census from 2011.

The government withheld National Crime Records Bureau data for 2017, discontinued Labour Bureau's quarterly enterprises survey and the Employment-Unemployment Survey, and instead plan to rely on provident fund data for calculation of unemployment, which is widely criticised.

== Health and sanitation policies ==
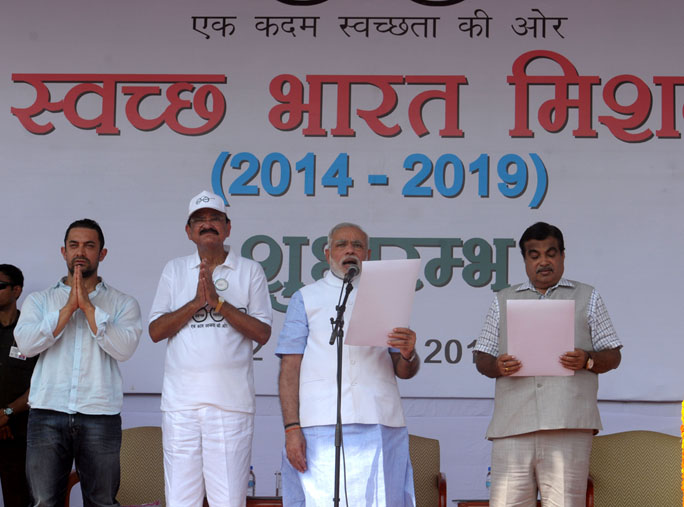
PM Modi launches Swachh Bharat Abhiyaan

In his first year as prime minister Modi reduced the amount of money spent by the government on healthcare. The Modi government launched a "New Health Policy" in January 2015. The policy did not increase the government's spending on healthcare, but placed emphasis on the role of private healthcare organisations. In its budget for the second year after it took office, the Modi government reduced healthcare spending by 15%. This represented a shift away from the policy of the previous Congress government, which had supported programs to support public health goals including reducing child and maternal mortality rates. The National Health Mission, which included public health programs targeted at these indices received nearly 25% less funds in 2015 than in the previous year. 15 national health programs, including those aimed at controlling tobacco use and supporting healthcare for the elderly, were merged with the National Health Mission, and received less funds than in previous years. Modi initially appointed Harsh Vardhan, a doctor and an advocate of tobacco control, minister of health. However, Vardhan was removed in November 2015. The government also proposed introducing stricter packaging laws for tobacco, but this effort was postponed because of the efforts of the tobacco lobby.

The Prime Minister, Narendra Modi launching the Pradhan Mantri Jan Arogya Yojana (PMJAY), at Ranchi, in Jharkhand on September 23, 2018

On 2 October 2014, Modi launched the Swachh Bharat Abhiyan ("Clean India") campaign. The stated goals of the campaign included eliminating open defecation, eliminating manual scavenging, and improving waste management practices. The campaign was announced on the anniversary of Mahatma Gandhi's birthday, and was planned to achieve these aims in five years, or in time for the 150th anniversary of his birth. As part of the programme, the Indian government began the construction of millions toilets in rural areas, as well as efforts to encourage people to use them. The government also announced plans to build new sewage treatment plants. The administration plans to construct 60 million toilets by 2019. The construction projects have faced allegations of corruption, and have faced severe difficulty in getting people to use the toilets constructed for them. Modi has generally emphasized his government's efforts at sanitation as a means of ensuring good health. He has also advocated yoga and traditional forms of medicine. An article in the medical journal Lancet stated that the country "might have taken a few steps back in public health" under the first year of the Modi government.

PM Modi at the inauguration of NAMO Hospital, in Daman on June 05, 2026.

Modi's government developed a draft policy to introduce a universal health care system, known as the National Health Assurance Mission. Under this plan, the government was to provide free drugs, diagnostic treatment, and insurance coverage for serious ailments, although budgetary concerns have delayed its implementation. The government announced "Ayushman Bharat" (National Health Protection Mission) in the 2018 Union Budget of India. It is World's largest health protection scheme, also being called ModiCare. The scheme will help 10 crore families in their medical need. Under the Ayushman Bharat programme, there is a new scheme has been announced by Arun Jaitley, the finance minister of India, called National Health Protection Scheme, providing a health insurance cover of ₹5 lac a family per annum. More than a lakh people have taken benefit of the scheme till October 2018.

== Education, skill development and social policy ==
PM Narendra Modi launching Pradhan Mantri Kaushal Vikas Yojna (PMKVY), on the occasion of the World Youth Skills Day, in New Delhi on July 15, 2015.

Pradhan Mantri Kaushal Vikas Yojana (PMKVY), a skill development initiative scheme of the Government of India for recognition and standardisation of skills. Cabinet approved an outlay of ₹120 billion (US$1.3 billion) for the project. The scheme has a target to train 1 crore Indian youth from 2016 to 2020. As of 18 July 2016, 17.93 lakh candidates were trained out of 18 lakh who enrolled for the scheme. The aim of the PMKVY scheme is to encourage aptitude towards employable skills and to increase working efficiency of probable and existing daily wage earners, by giving monetary awards and rewards and by providing quality training to them. Average award amount per person has been kept as ₹8,000 (US$85). Those wage earners already possessing a standard level of skill will be given recognition as per scheme and average award amount for them is ₹2000 to ₹2500. In the initial year, a target to distribute ₹15 billion (US$160 million) has been laid down for the scheme. Training programmes have been worked out on the basis of National Occupational Standards (NOS) and qualification packs specifically developed in various sectors of skills. For this qualification plans and quality plans have been developed by various Sector Skill Councils (SSC) created with participation of Industries. National Skill Development Corporation (NSDC) has been made coordinating and driving agency for the same.

An outlay of ₹120 billion (US$1.3 billion) has been approved by the cabinet for this project. The scheme has a target to train 1 crore Indian youth from 2016 to 2020. As of 18 July 2016, 17.93 lakh candidates were trained out of 18 lakh who enrolled for the scheme.

The government began formulating a New Education Policy, or NEP, soon after its election. This was the third education policy introduced by the Indian government, following those of 1968 and 1986. The policy was described as having overtones of Hindutva. The RSS had a role in its creation, and it did not explicitly mention the goals of "socialism, secularism and democracy" that had been mentioned in the first two policies. The policy emphasised the education of minority students, as well as those of economically backward groups, in particular on improving enrolment in schools among those groups. The policy proposed bringing religious educational institutions under the Right to Education Act. There was also a debate about removing caste-based reservation in favour of reservation based on income, a move supported by the RSS, but which was criticised as being discriminatory on the basis of caste. As of October 2018, the new policy had not been implemented.

The Prime Minister, Shri Narendra Modi at the inauguration of the first edition of Khelo India School Games, at the Indira Gandhi Indoor Stadium, in New Delhi on January 31, 2018

In 2019, the government passed the Transgender Persons (Protection of Rights) Act, 2019, which was protested against by some members of the LGBTQ+ community.

In July 2020, the government unveiled the National Education Policy 2020, "envisioning an India-centric education system that contributes directly to transforming our nation sustainably into an equitable and vibrant knowledge society by providing high-quality education to all" and making "India a global knowledge superpower".

Modi's government has also implemented large increases to the country's sporting budget, with investments in sporting infrastructure and the establishment of the Khelo India programme. The government has also supported Ahmedabad's bid for the 2036 Summer Olympics and its hosting of the 2030 Commonwealth Games.

In July 2026, protests against the Modi government's handling of the NEET paper leak led to the resignation of Union Education Minister Dharmendra Pradhan.

== Foreign policy ==
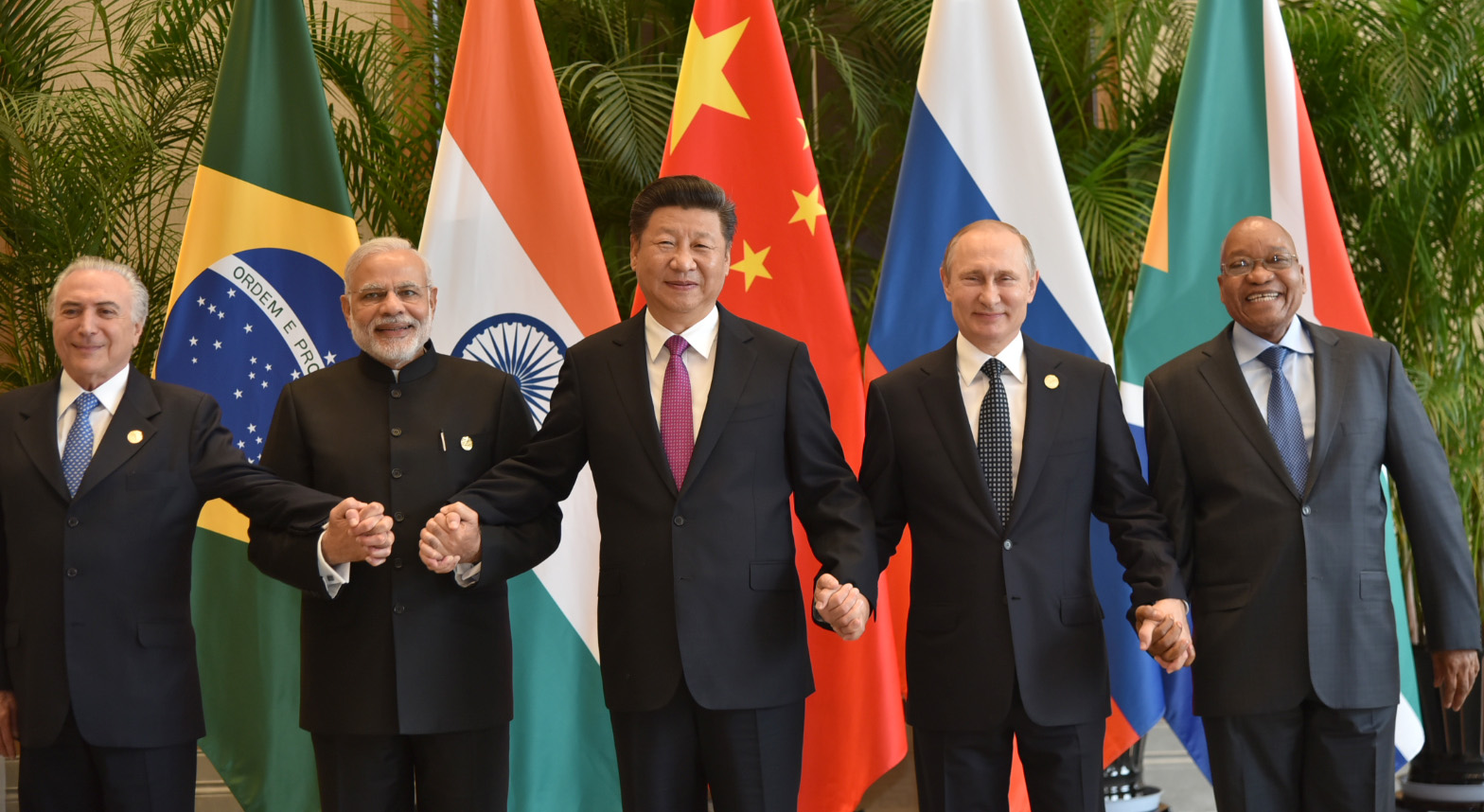
Modi with other BRICS leaders in 2016. Left to right: Temer, Modi, Xi, Putin and Zuma.

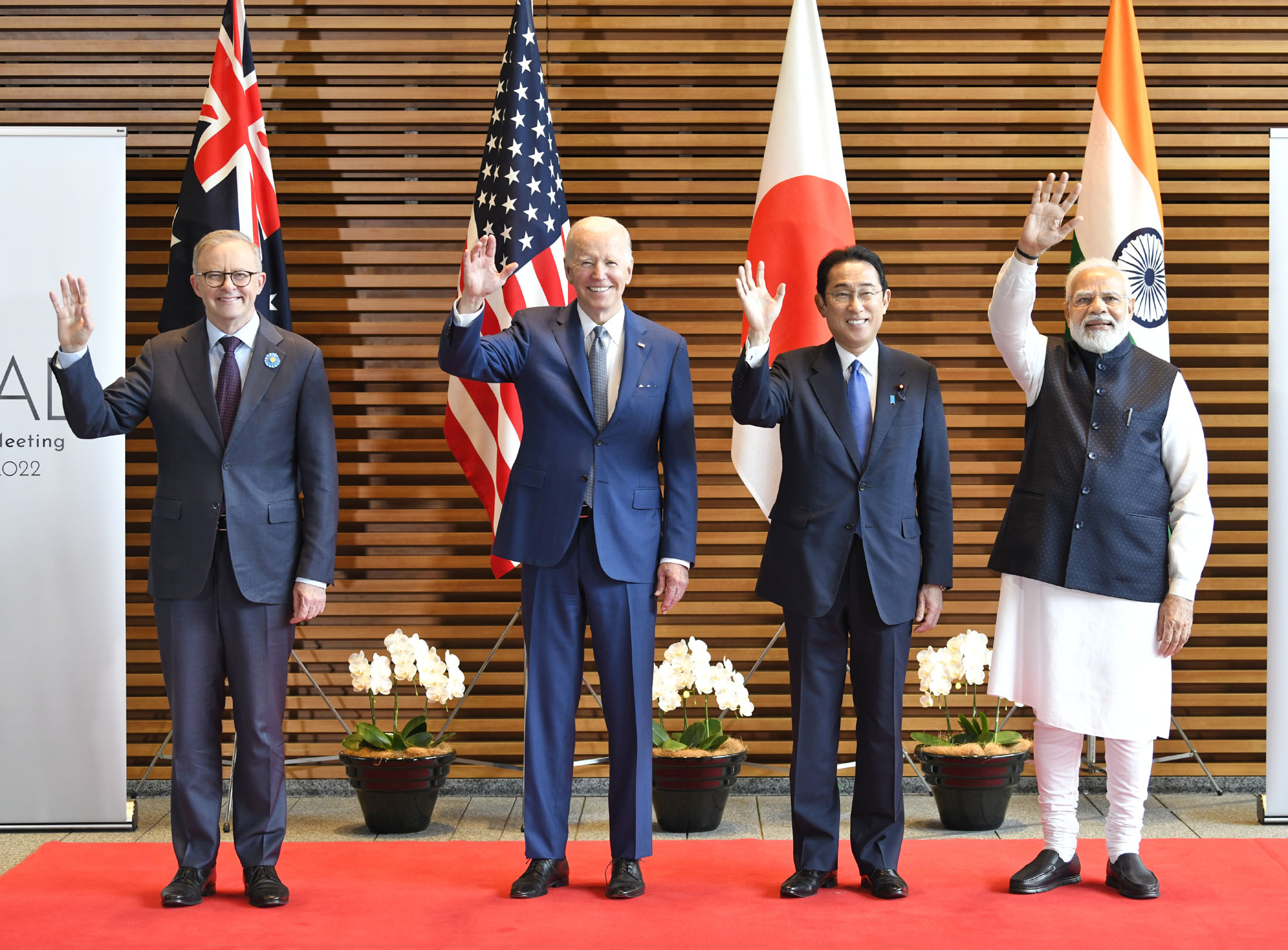
Modi at the May 2022 Quadrilateral Security Dialogue meeting with Australian prime minister Anthony Albanese, US president Joe Biden and Japanese prime minister Fumio Kishida

Foreign policy played a relatively small role in Modi's election campaign, and did not feature prominently in the BJP's election manifesto. Modi invited all the other leaders of SAARC countries to the ceremony where he was sworn in as prime minister. He was the first Indian prime minister to do so. Observers have stated that due to Modi portraying himself as a strong and nationalist leader during his election campaign, he would be politically unable to follow a policy of restraint that India had previously followed after terrorist attacks, and is more likely to have a military response.

Modi's foreign policy focused on improving economic ties, improving security, and increased regional relations, which is very similar to the policy of the preceding INC government. Modi continued his predecessor Manmohan Singh's policy of "multialignment." This involved the use of regional multilateral institutions and strategic partnerships to further the interests of the Indian government. The Modi administration tried to attract foreign investment in the Indian economy from several sources, especially in East Asia. The Modi government also upgraded several of India's military alliances, although it was unable to conclude negotiations for a trilateral defence agreement with Japan and Australia. As a part of this policy, the Modi government completed India's application to join the Shanghai Cooperation Organisation, which is led by China and Russia. (SCO). It also joined the Asian Infrastructure Investment Bank founded by China. Together with the US government, it created a "Joint Strategic Vision" for the Indian and Pacific oceans. The government also tried to improve relations with Islamic republics in the Middle East, such as Bahrain, the Islamic Republic of Iran, Saudi Arabia, and the United Arab Emirates, as well as with Israel, with the intent to also "link west." Modi added five bilateral strategic partnerships to the 25 that had been agreed by his predecessors Singh and Vajpayee.

During the first few months after the election, Modi made trips to a number of different countries to further the goals of his policy, and attended the BRICS, ASEAN, and G20 summits. During these visits, Modi attempted to draw further foreign investment in the Indian economy, with the use of slogans such as "Make in India" and "Digital India," put forward during a visit to Silicon Valley. One of Modi's first visits as prime minister was to Nepal, during which he promised a billion USD in aid. Another early visit was to Bhutan. Modi also made several overtures to the United States, including multiple visits to that country. While this was described as an unexpected development, due to the US having previously denied Modi a travel visa over his alleged failure to control the 2002 Gujarat riots, it was also expected to strengthen diplomatic and trade relations between the two countries. As of July 2016, Modi had made 51 trips to 42 countries with the intent of strengthening diplomatic relations.

In 2015, the Indian parliament ratified a land exchange deal with Bangladesh about the India–Bangladesh enclaves, which had been initiated by the government of Manmohan Singh. Modi's administration gave renewed attention to India's "Look East Policy", instituted in 1991. The policy was renamed the "Act East policy", and involved directing Indian foreign policy towards East Asia and Southeast Asia. The government signed agreements to improve land connectivity with Myanmar, through the state of Manipur. This represented a break with India's historic engagement with Myanmar, which prioritized border security over trade. In June 2018, PM Modi articulated India's vision towards the "Indo-Pacific region" for the first time. A central feature of Indian PM Modi's foreign policy has been to advance the need to create a "free, open, and inclusive" Indo-Pacific.

He coined the concept of "three Ds" – democracy, demography and demand – to reflect the strength of the country.

== Defence and security ==
PM Narendra Modi visits Adampur airforce base - Operation Sindoor.

During the 2014 election campaign, Modi and the BJP pledged to revisit India's nuclear weapons doctrine, and in particular India's historical policy of no-first-use. The pressure to revise the doctrine came from a desire for assertiveness among Indian government and defence officials. Soon after being sworn in as prime minister, Modi said that no revision would take place in the immediate future. The election manifesto of the BJP had also promised to deal with illegal immigration into India in the Northeast, as well as to be more firm in its handling of insurgent groups. During the election campaign, Modi said that he would be willing to accommodate Hindu migrants who were being persecuted in Bangladesh, but those that came with "political objectives" would have to be sent back to Bangladesh. The Modi government issued a notification allowing Hindu, Sikh, and Buddhist illegal immigrants from Pakistan and Bangladesh to legalize their residency in India. The government described the measure as being taken for humanitarian reasons. However, it drew criticism from several Assamese organizations.

PM arrived on the sidelines of Diwali celebration at INS Vikrant on October 20, 2025.

Modi continued the previous administration's policy of increasing military spending every year, announcing an increase of 11% in the military budget in 2015. This increase was larger than the average growth under the Congress.

The Prime Minister, Shri Narendra Modi celebrating Diwali with the jawans of the Indian Army and ITBP, at Harsil, in Uttarakhand on November 07, 2018.

The Modi administration negotiated a peace agreement with the largest faction of the National Socialist Council of Nagaland (NSCM), which was announced in August 2015. The Naga insurgency in northwest India had begun in the 1950s. The NSCM and the government had agreed to a ceasefire in 1997, but a peace accord had not previously been signed. In 2015 the government abrogated a 15-year ceasefire with the Khaplang faction of the NSCM (NSCM-K). The NSCM-K responded with a series of attacks, which killed 18 people. The Modi government carried out a raid across the border with Myanmar as a result, and labelled the NSCM-K a terrorist organization.

PM laying wreath to brave security personnel for their sacrifices, selfless service and unwavering devotion to the nation at CoBRA Operations Base, in Karanpur, Bastar, Chhattisgarh on November 08, 2026.

Modi has repeatedly stated that Pakistan is an exporter of terrorism. Modi increased the monetary compensation for victims of terrorist attacks, and stated that citizens of Azad Kashmir could also apply for this compensation. In September 2016, he urged the BRICS to target and destroy funding channels of terrorist groups. On 29 September 2016, the Indian Army stated that it had conducted a surgical strike on terror launchpads in PoK, Pakistan denied the claims, while details of the confrontation were later released by the Indian Army. Video footages were released of the confrontations.

Modi also played a crucial role and known for involving in 2017 China–India border standoff at the Doklam making the Defence policy strict against China and also strengthening relations with Bhutan.

On 14 February 2019, a convoy of vehicles transporting Central Reserve Police Force (CRPF) personnel on the Jammu–Srinagar National Highway was targeted by a vehicle-borne suicide bomber at Lethapora, in the Pulwama district of Jammu and Kashmir, India. The attack resulted in the deaths of 46 CRPF personnel and the bomber. Responsibility for the attack was claimed by the Pakistan-based Islamist terrorist group Jaish-e-Mohammed. In response, on 26 February 2019, the Indian Air Force (IAF) conducted an airstrike across the Line of Control, targeting an area near Balakot in Pakistan's Khyber Pakhtunkhwa province. India stated that the strike targeted a Jaish-e-Mohammed training facility and claimed that a significant number of militants—reportedly between 300 and 350—were killed. Pakistan denied these claims, asserting that the IAF aircraft were intercepted by Pakistani fighter jets and that the Indian jets released their payloads in haste before returning across the Line of Control, causing no casualties or damage.

Following Galwan valley skirmishes, there were made serious policies against China. On 17 June 2020, Modi addressed the nation regarding the Galwan skirmish, giving a firm message directed at China over the deaths of Indian soldiers. The first communication since the start of the border dispute between the foreign ministers of China, Wang Yi and of India, S Jaishankar also happened after the Galwan skirmish. S Jaishankar accused the Chinese actions in Galwan to be "pre-meditated and planned".

Since May 2023, ethnic tensions between some groups have resulted in violent clashes in Manipur. After 1 month of the violence, nearly 100 were killed and more than 36,000 people were displaced. Modi has been criticised for his lack of reaction towards the violence.

In the Naxalite–Maoist insurgency, the Indian government declared victory in March 2026, citing a sharp decline in violence. However, this was disputed by at least two Maoist commanders.

=== Security breaches and major terrorist attacks ===
Modi's premiership has been marked by several terrorist attacks and security lapses, particularly in the conflict-prone region of Jammu and Kashmir, as well as other parts of India.

2016 Pathankot Attack

On 2 January 2016, an armed group of terrorists, allegedly linked to the Pakistan-based Jaish-e-Mohammed (JeM), attacked an Indian Air Force base in Pathankot, Punjab. The attack resulted in the deaths of seven security personnel and one civilian, with all six attackers killed. Critics highlighted intelligence failures and delays in response as contributing factors.

2016 Uri Attack

On 18 September 2016, four heavily armed militants attacked an Indian Army brigade headquarters in Uri, Jammu and Kashmir, killing nineteen soldiers and injuring over thirty. The attack, attributed to Jaish-e-Mohammed, prompted a strong response from the Modi government, which authorised a surgical strike on 29 September 2016 across the Line of Control (LoC) targeting terrorist launchpads in Pakistan-administered Kashmir. While the government hailed the strike as a success, Pakistan denied the claims, and the incident escalated tensions between the two nations.

2019 Pulwama Attack

On 14 February 2019, a suicide bombing targeting a convoy of Central Reserve Police Force (CRPF) personnel in Pulwama, Jammu and Kashmir, killed forty soldiers and injured thirty five others. The attack, claimed by Jaish-e-Mohammed, was the deadliest terrorist attack on Indian security forces in decades. The Modi government responded with the Balakot airstrike on 26 February 2019, targeting a JeM training camp in Pakistan. Open source satellite imagery revealed that no targets of consequence were hit. The airstrike was followed by an aerial skirmish, leading to heightened India-Pakistan tensions. The incident was leveraged in Modi's 2019 election campaign.

2023 Parliament breach

On 13 December 2023, a major security breach occurred at the Indian Parliament in New Delhi, when two individuals jumped into the Lok Sabha chamber from the visitors' gallery, releasing smoke canisters, while two others detonated smoke outside, protesting unemployment and perceived authoritarianism. Enabled by lax security checks and visitor passes linked to a BJP MP Pratap Simha, the incident exposed significant vulnerabilities. The Modi government faced criticism for intelligence and security failures, with opposition leaders framing them as systemic issues. The response included arrests under the UAPA, stricter security protocols, and a controversial suspension of one hundred and forty six opposition MPs.

2025 Pahalgam attack

On 22 April 2025, a terrorist attack in Baisaran Valley near Pahalgam, Anantnag district, Jammu and Kashmir, killed at least twenty six tourists, including two foreign nationals, and injured over twenty others. The Resistance Front (TRF), largely believed to be an offshoot of the Pakistan-based Lashkar-e-Taiba (LeT), claimed responsibility, citing resistance to demographic changes in the Kashmir Valley, though the claim was later retracted. The attack, the deadliest since the 2008 Mumbai attacks, targeted Hindu tourists, with reports of religious profiling by the attackers. Modi condemned the attack, cut short a visit to Saudi Arabia, and chaired a Cabinet Committee on Security (CCS) meeting, announcing measures such as suspending the Indus Waters Treaty and closing the Attari-Wagah border post. The government acknowledged security lapses, drawing criticism from the opposition.

== Environmental policies ==
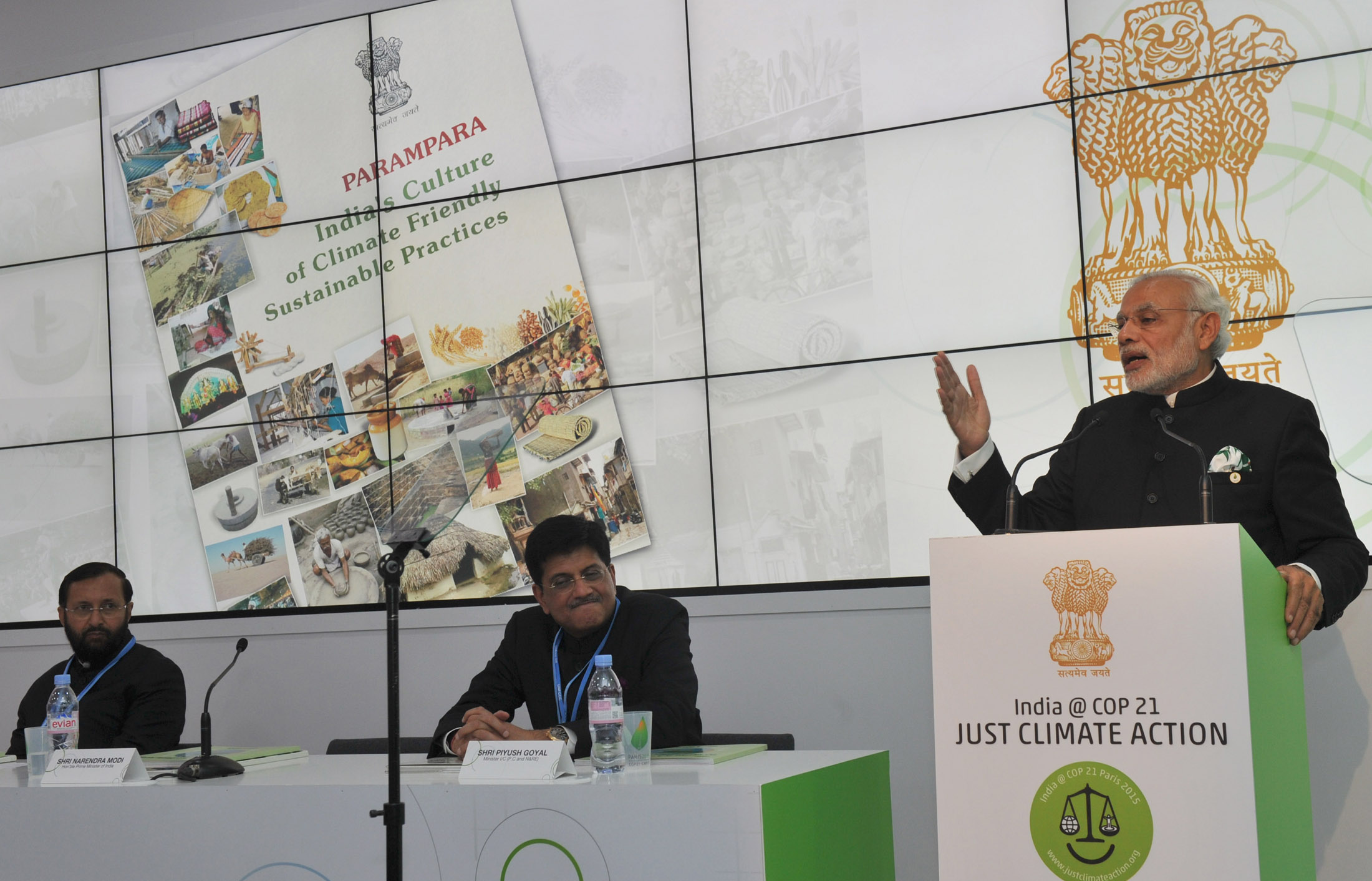
Modi (right) at CoP21 Climate Conference, in Paris, announcing the founding of an International Solar Alliance (ISA). November 2015.

In naming his cabinet, Modi renamed the "Ministry of Environment and Forests" to the "Ministry of Environment, Forests, and Climate Change." In the first budget of the government, the money allotted to this ministry was reduced by more than 50%. The new ministry also removed or diluted a number of laws related to environmental protection. These included no longer requiring clearance from the National Board for Wildlife for projects close to protected areas, and allowing certain projects to proceed before environmental clearance was received. The government also tried to reconstitute the Wildlife board such that it no longer had representatives from non-governmental organisations: however, this move was prevented by the Supreme court.

Modi also relaxed or abolished a number of other environmental regulations, particularly those related to industrial activity. A government committee stated that the existing system only served to create corruption and that the government should instead rely on the owners of industries to voluntarily inform the government about the pollution they were creating. The changes were made with the aim of accelerating approval for industrial projects. Other changes included reducing ministry oversight on small mining projects, and no longer requiring approval from tribal councils for projects inside forested areas. In addition, Modi lifted a moratorium on new industrial activity in the most polluted areas in the countries. The changes were welcomed by business people but were criticized by environmentalists.

Under the UPA government that preceded Modi's administration, field trials of Genetically Modified crops had essentially put on hold, after protests from farmers fearing for their livelihoods. Under the Modi government these restrictions were gradually lifted. The government received some criticism for freezing the bank accounts of environmental group Greenpeace, citing financial irregularities, although a leaked government report said that the freeze had to do with Greenpeace's opposition to GM crops.

At the CoP21 Climate Conference on 30 November 2015 Modi announced the founding of an International Solar Alliance (ISA). The headquarters of the ISA would be located in Gurgaon, and would receive support from the Indian government for a few years. All tropical countries were invited to join the alliance. He was also awarded the United Nations Champions of the Earth award in 2018 for his environmental policies.

In 2022, India was placed at the bottom of the Environmental Performance Index (EPI) getting the lowest rank among 180 countries.

== Other initiatives and issues ==
Modi's first year as prime minister saw significant centralisation of power relative to previous administrations. Modi personally selected the civil servants who served under his ministers, frequently giving them instructions without involving the ministers themselves. Modi's efforts at centralisation have been linked to an increase in the number of senior administration officials resigning their positions. Although the government has a majority of seats in the Lok Sabha, it does not have one in the Rajya Sabha, which led to its policies frequently being stymied there. Thus, Modi resorted to passing a number of ordinances, or executive orders, to enact his policies, leading to further centralisation of power. In 2014, the Prime Minister's Office prevented Gopal Subramaniam from being appointed to the Supreme Court. The stated reason was that his conduct in the 2G spectrum allocation case had been suspect: commentators stated it was because he had been the amicus curiae in the Sohrabuddin Sheikh case, which had implicated BJP leaders including Modi's aide Amit Shah. The government also passed a bill increasing the control that it had over the appointment of judges, and reducing that of the judiciary.

On 31 December 2014, Modi announced that the Planning Commission had been scrapped. It was replaced with a body called the National Institution for Transforming India, or NITI Aayog. The Planning Commission was a legacy of the Indian independence movement, although critics said that it was slowing economic growth. The new body includes the leaders of all 29 Indian states, but its full-time staff report directly to the prime minister. The move had the effect of greatly centralising the power previously with the planning commission in the person of the prime minister. It also reduced the extent of control individual states had over their financial allocation from the union government, and unlike the planning commission, it does not have the power to allocate funds. The planning commission had received heavy criticism in previous years for creating inefficiency in the government, and of not filling its role of improving social welfare: however, since the economic liberalisation of the 1990s, it had been the major government body responsible for measures related to social justice.

As Prime Minister, Modi announced the abolition of a number of regulations previously placed on Indian businesses, such as a complex permit and inspection system. The move was aimed at reducing red tape and making it easier to do business. Modi also ordered reform among the bureaucrats of the Indian Administrative Service to ensure a more efficient government bureaucracy.

The Modi government launched a crackdown against a number of civil society organisations. Several tens of thousands of organisations were investigated by the Intelligence Bureau in the first year of the administration, on the grounds that they were slowing economic growth. International humanitarian aid organisation Medecins Sans Frontieres was among the groups that were put under pressure. Other organisations affected included the Sierra Club and Avaaz. Cases of sedition were filed against individuals criticising the government. This led to discontent with Modi's style of functioning within the BJP, and drew comparisons to the governing style of Indira Gandhi.

Modi government has exploited the terrorism prevention law UAPA to intimidate and imprison critics and activists. He started a monthly radio program titled "Mann ki Baat" on 3 October 2014.

=== Repealing obsolete laws ===
Modi repealed 1,200 obsolete laws dating back to British rule in first three years as prime minister, against a total of 1,301 such laws repealed by previous governments over a span of 64 years. The legislations passed in the parliament for the purpose include Repealing and Amending Act, 2015, Repealing and Amending (Second) Act, 2015, Repealing and Amending Act, 2016, Repealing and Amending Act, 2017 and Repealing and Amending (Second) Act, 2017.

Among the major British era laws repealed by the Modi government are the Indian Penal Code, Code of Criminal Procedure & Indian Evidence Act. The new laws replacing them have made the definition of sedition & terrorism ambiguous; thereby increasing the government's power to stifle dissent & curtail free speech, made the chances of obtaining bail more difficult, decreased the scope of plea bargaining, empowered the police to violate the digital privacy of individuals, confiscate the properties of the accused even before commencement of trial & to launch investigation without registering any FIR at will, made it more difficult for the defendants to defend themselves at court and encourages prosecutors to produce potentially dubious evidence.

=== IT policy ===
Modi launched the Digital India programme, which has the goal of ensuring that government services are available electronically, building infrastructure so rural areas get high-speed Internet access, boosting manufacturing of electronic goods in the country, and promoting digital literacy. Under the programme, 400 railway Stations across the country are being equipped with Wi-Fi technology. In the 2017 Union Budget of India, POS machines, scanners, fingerprint readers, iris scanners and micro ATMs were exempted from all kinds of custom duties. The internet penetration in India rose from 20 percent in 2014 to 28.7 percent in 2016.

=== COVID-19 pandemic ===
During the second wave of the pandemic in April 2021, Modi's government launched a new policy for vaccines which allowed Serum Institute of India and Bharat Biotech to earn huge profit margins making vaccine doses distributed by the private hospitals unaffordable for working-class families in India. The requirement to book the vaccination slots online excluded many Indians who did not have smartphones or internet access.

During the COVID-19 pandemic, many estimates, including by The Lancet and World Health Organization, say India undercounted number of deaths, ranging from a factor of 5 to 10 times.

On 30 January 2022, India announced that it administered about 1.7 billion doses of vaccines and more than 720 million people were fully vaccinated.

According to a 2022 study published in The Lancet Infectious Diseases journal, over 4.2 million lives were saved in India in 2021 due to vaccination against COVID-19.

== See also ==
- List of international prime ministerial trips made by Narendra Modi
- Chief ministership of Narendra Modi
- List of awards and honours received by Narendra Modi
- Democracy in India
- Presidency of Pranab Mukherjee
- Presidency of Ram Nath Kovind
- Presidency of Droupadi Murmu
