= Information Technology Rules, 2021 =

2021 rules stemming from section 87 of the Information Technology Act, 2000

Intermediary Guidelines and Digital Media Ethics Code
- Long title: Information Technology (Intermediary Guidelines and Digital Media Ethics Code) Rules, 2021
- Citation: via The Gazette of India
- Commenced: 25 February 2021
- Introduced by: Ministry of Electronics and Information Technology
- Status: In force

The Information Technology (Intermediary Guidelines and Digital Media Ethics Code) Rules, 2021 is secondary or subordinate legislation that suppresses India's Intermediary Guidelines Rules 2011. (Note: The IT Act elaborates that intermediaries must observe due diligence while discharging their duties, and also observe such other guidelines as prescribed by the Central Government. Accordingly, the Information Technology (Intermediaries Guidelines) Rules, 2011 came into being.) The 2021 rules have stemmed from section 87 of the Information Technology Act, 2000 and are a combination of the draft Intermediaries Rules, 2018 and the OTT Regulation and Code of Ethics for Digital Media.

The Central Government of India along with the Ministry of Electronics and Information Technology (MeitY) and the Ministry of Information and Broadcasting (MIB) have coordinated in the development of the rules.

Intermediaries had until 25 May 2021 to comply with the rules.

== History ==
During Monsoon session of the Parliament in 2018 a motion on “Misuse of social media platforms and spreading of fake news” was admitted. The Minister of Electronics and Information Technology accordingly made a detailed statement of the "resolve of the Government to strengthen the legal framework and make the social media platforms accountable under the law". MeitY then prepared the draft Information Technology (Intermediary Guidelines) Rules 2018 to replace the 2022 rules. The Information Technology Act, 2000 provided that intermediaries are protected liabilities in some cases. The draft 2018 Rules sought to elaborate the liabilities and responsibilities of the intermediaries in a better way. Further the draft Rules have been made "in order to prevent spreading of fake news, curb obscene information on the internet, prevent misuse of social-media platforms and to provide security to the users." The move followed a notice issued to WhatsApp in July 2018, warning it against helping to spread fake news and look on as a "mute spectator".

In relation to the Prajawala case, on 11 December 2018, the Supreme Court of India observed that "the Government of India may frame the necessary Guidelines / SOP and implement them within two weeks so as to eliminate child pornography, rape and gang rape imageries, videos and sites in content hosting platforms and other applications." Further a parliamentary report laid in 2020 studied the effect of pornography on children.

On 5 January 2019 a government open house was held to discuss the Rules. Further, ten days were given for counter comments, until 28 January. On 21 September 2019 the Centre informed the Madras High Court bench under Justice M Sathyanarayanan that deliberations on the Draft Rules 2018 had been completed. Facebook wrote a plea to transfer the matter to the Supreme Court.

MeitY had invited comments on proposed amendments early in 2019. The amendments were seen by many to "overstep the aforesaid intention sparking concerns of violating free speech and privacy rights of individuals." It is seen that "the guidelines suffer with excessive delegation of powers and shift the burden of responsibility of identification of unlawful content from a government/ judiciary to intermediaries." A total of 171 comments were received by MeitY; all of the comments were published for counter comments. On 21 October 2019, MeitY asked the court for three months’ time for finalisation of the Intermediary Rules, 2018.

== About ==
Rules to be administered by MeitY include the due diligence required of intermediaries and the grievance redressal mechanism. Rules to be administered by MIB include a code of ethics, a self-classification system and an oversight mechanism.

=== Tracking the origin of information ===
Rule 4(2) covers the "identification of the first originator of the information". The extent of the first originator is limited to India— "Provided further that where the first originator of any information on the computer resource of an intermediary is located outside the territory of India, the first originator of that information within the territory of India shall be deemed to be the first originator of the information."

=== Additional due diligence ===
Rule 4 (1)(a),(b), & (c) of the guidelines require the appointment of a Chief Compliance Officer, a nodal contact person and a Resident Grievance Officer.

== Concerns ==
=== Concerns over the 2018 draft ===
Various issues have been pointed out with the rules such as restriction of free speech, requirements such as automatic identification and removal of content, and lack of elaboration on how the five million users will be calculated. The Internet Freedom Foundation called these rules, "substantively harmful to our fundamental right". Questions raised included if "intermediaries" include online media portals, raised by Free Software Movement of India. Mozilla (Firefox), also raised issues with the draft Rules. BSA (The Software Alliance) wrote to MeitY to "exclude enterprise cloud service providers" from the scope of the Rules and to remove the filtering obligations. Centre for Internet and Society has raised concerns with the draft rules and has asked for changes such as that draft Rule 3(2), Rule 3(4), Rule 3(5), Rule 3(10) be completely deleted. A joint letter written by a group of experts from research, academia, and media, including Faisal Farooqui, Karma Paljor, Nikhil Pahwa, Shamnad Basheer and professors from IIM Bangalore and IIT Bombay, and organisations including Free Software Foundation Tamil Nadu, Free Software Movement of India, Free Software Movement Karnataka and Software Freedom Law Centre, India, to MeitY, pointed out various issues the Rules could cause such as the traceability requirements interfering with the privacy rights of citizens. (Note: Say the rights to privacy enshrined in the Puttaswamy judgement of the Supreme Court.)

== Aftermath ==
Amit Khare, Secretary, Ministry of Information and Broadcasting has called the rules as a "progressive institutional mechanism". Immediately following the publication of the rules, a number of platforms advised creators of caution on the basis of the new rules. Petitions have been filed challenging the rules with respect to the digital news media. The Foundation for Independent Journalism editor M. K. Venu (The Wire) and The News Minute editor Dhanya Rajendran filed the first case challenging the rules. LiveLaw, The Quint and Pratidhvani have challenged the rules in court. On 25 May 2021, the last day for intermediaries to comply, WhatsApp sued the Government of India over the rules. The Ministry of Electronics and Information Technology, described the action as "clear act of defiance". After a statement made by Twitter, the government released a press statement which said, "Protecting free speech in India is not the prerogative of only a private, for-profit, foreign entity like Twitter, but it is the commitment of the world’s largest democracy and its robust institutions. Twitter’s statement is an attempt to dictate its terms to the world's largest democracy. Through its actions and deliberate defiance, Twitter seeks to undermine India's legal system. Furthermore, Twitter refuses to comply with those very regulations in the Intermediary Guidelines on the basis of which it is claiming a safe harbour protection from any criminal liability in India." On 5 July 2021, the government released a statement claiming Twitter has lost its liability protection concerning user-generated content. This was brought on by Twitter's failure to comply with the new rules with a filing stating that the company failed to appoint executives to govern user content on the platform. In July 2021, Press Trust of India moved the Delhi High Court over the rules. According to Apar Gupta, "there is judicial consensus that they lack statutory backing and harm freedom of speech and expression.".

== See also ==
- Information Technology Act, 2000
- Digital Personal Data Protection Act, 2023
- Personal Data Protection Bill 2019
- Shreya Singhal v. Union of India
- 2021 Indian social media regulations
