= Kunal Kamra v. Union of India =

2023 constitutional case law pertaining online free speech

- Court: Bombay High Court
- Full case name: Kunal Kamra v. Union of India & Ors.
- Decided: September 26, 2024
- Charge: Challenge to the Information Technology (Intermediary Guidelines and Digital Media Ethics Code) Amendment Rules, 2023.
- Citation: Writ Petition (L) No. 9792 of 2023

Court membership
- Judges sitting: Bombay High Court: G. S. Patel and Neela Gokhale (Division Bench); A. S. Chandurkar (Third Judge); Supreme Court of India: D. Y. Chandrachud (CJI), J. B. Pardiwala, and Manoj Misra

Kunal Kamra v. Union of India was a public interest litigation filed by Indian comedian Kunal Kamra along with several organisations including editors, journalists, and publication houses in the Bombay High Court challenging the constitutionality of the 2023 amendment to the Information Technology Rules (2021). The amendment introduced a government-established "fact-checking" unit to identify and flag or remove social media content related to government affairs as fake, false, or misleading. The amendment raised concerns about freedom of speech and expression, the potential for government censorship, and the extent of safe harbour protection for social media intermediaries in India, with the petitioners highlighting the lack of clear standards and arbitrary scope of censorship. The two-judge bench of the court issued a split verdict, leading to a tie-breaker decision by Justice Chandurkar who issued a judgement in the favour of plaintiffs holding that the rules were unconstitutional and exceeded the authority granted by the IT Act, 2000. As of 2025, an appeal against the judgement is pending before the Supreme Court of India.

== Background ==
On April 6, 2023, the Indian government introduced amendements to Information Technology (Intermediary Guidelines and Digital Media Ethics Code) Rules, 2021 including a provision to establish a "fact-checking unit (FCU)" to flag "fake, false or misleading online content related to the [central] government". Press Information Bureau, an agency of the Ministry of Information and Broadcasting was designated as the fact-checking body. Once a content was flagged, the intermediaries (social media platforms, for example) were expected to take down the content or lose their safe-harbour provisions protecting them from liability for user-generated content.

Kunal Kamra, a political satirist who frequently uses social media to comment on government policies and actions, filed a writ petition in the Bombay High Court in April 2023 challenging the constitutionality of these new rules. He argued that the establishment of FCU violated several provisions of the Information Technology Act, 2000 (IT Act) and the Constitution of India, and that the rules would have a "chilling effect" on free speech and his ability to practice his profession, as intermediaries would be incentivised to take down any content critical of the government to avoid legal risks. In June 2023, several other organisations, including the Editors Guild of India, the Association of Indian Magazines, and the News Broadcasters and Digital Association, also filed challenges against the rule. Several digital rights advoacy organisations such as Internet Freedom Foundation and Electronic Frontier Foundation published statements criticising the amendment noting its adverse impact on online freedom of speech and right to receive information and sought to challenge the rule.

The appeals were heard and adjudicated together by a two-judge division bench of Bombay High Court consisting of Justices Gautam S Patel and Neela Gokhale.

== Judgement ==
On January 31, 2024, the judges issued a split-verdict with Justice Patel finding the rules unconstitutional while Justice Gokhle upholding their validity. Subsequently, the case was referred to Justice A. S. Chandrukar as the third judge to break the tie. While the matter was being deliberated, the petitioners requested an interim stay order which was denied by the Bombay High Court but granted by Supreme Court of India on appeal.

In the final judgement, Justice Chandrukar agreed with Justice Patel, finding that the rules of the amendment violated the Articles 14, 19(1)(a), and 19(1)(g) of the Constitution of India and exceeded the authority granted by the IT Act of 2000. He agreed with plaintiffs contention that the rules were vague, lacked procedural safeguards, and created a chilling effect making it too broad and arbitrary.

== Significance ==
The judgement is considered significant for establishing a critical precedent in support of protecting and expanding the freedom of expression by limiting government intervention and censorship.
