= Shreya =

- Gender: Female
- Language: Sanskrit, Hindi

Origin
- Origin: Indian,
- Region of origin: India

Other names
- Derived: Sanskrit
- Related names: Shriya, Sreya, Shreeya, Shreyashi

Shreya is an Indian feminine given name. It is a name of Hindu Goddess Lakshmi and it means attributes of Lakshmi- good fortune, beauty and excellence. Notable people with the name include:

- Shreya Ghoshal (born 1984), Indian playback singer
- Shreya Guhathakurta (born 1975), Indian Rabindra Sangeet singer
- Shreya Narayan (born 1985), Indian actress, model, writer, and social worker
- Shreya Shanker (born 1997), Indian beauty pageant winner
- Shreya Sharma, Indian film actress
- Shreya Singhal, Indian lawyer, known for Shreya Singhal v. Union of India
- Shreya Tripathi (died 2018), Indian health activist

== Fictional characters ==
- Shreya, a character in the video game Aegis Defenders
- Shreya Viswanathan, a Season 5 contestant in Fetch! with Ruff Ruffman

== See also ==
- Shriya
- Shreyas
