= Vidyut Gore =

Indian blogger, activist, author and digital journalist (born 1976)

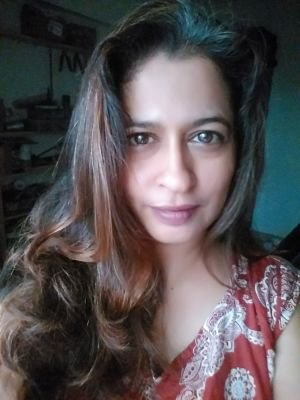
- Born: 6 December 1976 (Note: While some sources seem to indicate year of birth is 1975 the subject herself clarified it is 1976 on her Twitter feed); India
- Other names: Vidyut Kale; Vidyut Gore-Kale
- Education: Indian Society for Applied Behavioural Science (ISABS)
- Occupations: Internet blogger, journalist, campaigner
- Notable credits: Writings on: Indian domestic abuse; Indian corruption
- Political party: Calls herself "apolitical"
- Website: Personal website

Vidyut Gore (Hindi pronunciation: [ʋɪd̪.jʊt̪ ɡor]) (born 6 December 1976), previously known as Vidyut Kale and sometimes simply as Vidyut is an outspoken Indian part-time blogger, new media journalist, campaigner and activist. She became noted for work exposing domestic abuse in Indian families, and her work in exposing political and public corruption in India has also been covered in both the Indian media and international media. Her challenges to Indian digital censorship, has been covered in academic study, and United Nations CSTD studies. She has been quoted numerous times by mainstream Indian media on social and political issues. In August 2019, she launched the Alt Sarkar spoof alternative government role-play project that has received diverse media attention.

== Blogs and websites ==
Gore has been blogging since 2009 on issues in Indian society, being described in 2010 as a "Wikileaks" of India. In October 2011, she came to national prominence in India due to her posts about the murders of Keenan Santos and Reuben Fernandes in Mumbai, which exposed evidence that the media and Indian police seemed to ignore. In 2013, India Today said of Gore: "The daredevil homemaker-cum-blogger shot into news with her blogs on the Keenan and Reuben murders in Mumbai. It was her efforts that helped the poor families get the attention that their case required and helped prevent the killers from going scot-free". Indian spymaster B. Raman, said of her work on getting justice for the perpetrators of the Keenan-Reuben murders: "We owe a debt of gratitude to Vidyut".

In September 2012, Gore's blog again came to national attention when she received documents regarding prominent Indian public figures involved in corrupt land deals, which Gore posted on her blog; she resisted orders to remove the material stating that it was correct, however she was later forced to relent when she received notices on under the controversial Indian IT Act, which even if the material was accurate, would still expose Gore to litigation. The censorship of Gore's 2012 disclosures under the Indian IT Act was covered in academic research on digital censorship.

In 2013, she gained further national Indian attention when she created spoof websites on Kapil Sibal, then Gujarat Chief Minister Narendra Modi and Congress general secretary Rahul Gandhi. India Today, describing Gore as "the brain behind the sarcasm sites", said that: "Her spoofs are a direct result of her anger at the politicians who say wrong things or stray away from their promises".

In 2014, Gore was identified by The Telegraph as being one of a small number of "women who matter in India's Twitterverse", noting that she described herself as "intellectual anarchist". In 2015, The Times of India covered Gore as one of two important female Twitter bloggers in India, noting that her work brings her into direct conflict with the "BJPs "unofficial" army of trolls".

Gore has also been involved with other Indian political campaigns and is quoted about her views on Indian politics and society in mainstream media.

Gore summarised her work on aamjanta.com into a self published book: Thoughts on India at aamjanata.com: from differences to diversity.

=== Domestic abuse ===
Gore has used her website to discuss issues like homophobia in India, and the extent of unreported domestic abuse in Indian families and society; for which Gore has received both international attention, academic and scholarly coverage, as well as mainstream Indian media attention. She has confronted domestic abuse in her own marriage and written about it. In March 2012 the New York Times quoted Gore as saying that "There is a silencing — from the family or from well-meaning friends who fear for the woman’s safety", and that: “The abuser never wants a spotlight on their actions, but breaking the silence is liberating. I stopped owning the shame when I spoke out”. She also told the New York Times that: "Most Indian women are in an unequal environment,” Ms. Gore said. “You go from your parents’ house to your husband's house. If they are no longer welcome in their parents’ home after marriage, what do they do when there's violence in their husband's home? Why should they end up homeless?”. In January 2015, one of Asia's highest rated think-tanks, the Observer Research Foundation, commented on Gore's struggle saying that: "When these women speak out about abuse, they are often labelled as hysterical, as seen clearly in the case of Kale", and that: "She faces as much abuse for her radical socio-political views as she gets for washing her dirty linen in public".

=== Alt Sarkar ===
In August 2019, Gore launched Alt Sarkar (which translates as "Government" in Hindi), a spoof alternative Indian government administration on the Twitter platform, where Gore was elected Prime Minister by Twitter followers. The role-play has included elections, speeches, and alternative policies with a full 17-member cabinet. The Hindu reported, "What’s interesting is that the "PM" and her 17 cabinet ministers — who come from across the country — are not just tweeting about what they think the government should be doing. Instead, they do a deep dive into the portfolio to study the real issues faced by the sector and propose solutions for them in policy notes", and that online trolling by right-wing Indian parties had helped spread Alt Sarkar to a national audience. Gore has also been interviewed by international media on Alt Sarkar with The Boston Globe asking: "Could a spoof government on Twitter be the platform of political change in India?".

=== Soap and plants ===
After the collapse of her marriage following the birth of her son in 2009, Gore was broke and started making soaps as gifts for friends and family on occasions, which eventually became a business for her. Sometime later, she combined it with her self-proclaimed "geeky interest in cultivating carnivorous plants", to develop an online home-made soap and specialist plant retailing business. Her products sometimes have names with political or social overtones, including "Bagon Mein Bahar Hai" (after Ravish Kumar used the term), "Urban Naxal", and "Kashmir"/"Silenced Valley".

== Digital journalism ==
In 2013, Gore's contribution was recognised by the United Nations Commission on Science and Technology for Development working group on "Democratizing the global governance of the Internet". Gore has contributed on rural affairs to Palagummi Sainath's digital People's Archive of Rural India, and to other English-Hindi language digital news websites such as The Quint, India Today's online DailyO news site, and Indian digital media entrepreneur Nikhil Pahwa's news site, MediaNama.

== Personal life ==
Gore is an alumnus of the Indian Society for Applied Behavioural Science (ISABS) and described herself as "apolitical".

Gore was a trekking guide in the Himalayas, and a corporate trainer, before getting married and settling down in Virar, Mumbai as Vidyut Kale, and turning into a full-time mother on the birth of her son in 2009. Gore's son was born with congenital difficulties which restricted her to staying more at home and led to her focus on political blogging as an outlet. Ironically, she noted that her family and her then-husband were Bharatiya Janata Party supporters, and that they never read her blog. She described that during this period, her marriage "fell apart", and she divorced, returning to Vidyut Gore.

As of May 2019, Gore reported that she was in a committed relationship, and had no plans to remarry.

From her experience running web servers Gore has devoted section of her various online sites to giving insights and opinions on her experiences.

== Bibliography ==
- Kale, Vidyut (October 2012). Thoughts on India at aamjanata.com: from differences to diversity. Saarbrücken BloggingBooks. ISBN 978-3-8417-7023-3. OCLC 863996004.
- Gore, Vidyut (October 2021). Marginally Human : Never Stop Fighting for What Matters. Savovar. Vol. 1. ISBN 9781684872312.

== See also ==
- Meera Vijayann, independent journalist covering gender-based violence
