= Apar Gupta =

Indian lawyer and digital rights activist

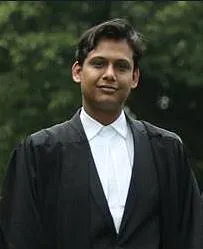
- Education: Amity Law School, Columbia Law School
- Occupations: Lawyer, Writer
- Awards: Ashoka Fellowship

Apar Gupta is a lawyer, founder and writer on democracy and technology from India. In 2019 he was elected as an Ashoka Fellow for, "creating a model for digital rights advocacy in the country that is driven by the public, for the public," as the co-founder of the Internet Freedom Foundation.

== Education ==
Gupta was born and raised in New Delhi, India. He attended Mount St Mary's School, obtained his B.A. (LLB) (Hons) degree from Amity Law School, and a postgraduate degree from the Columbia University School of Law.

== Law Practice ==
Gupta started out as a commercial litigator at Karanjawala & Co., and later merged his own firm Accendo Law Partners with Advani & Co. in 2010. He was included in the Forbes India 30 under 30 list in 2014.

Gupta resigned in 2015 to start his own law chamber where he represented parties in notable civil liberties and constitutional cases that have digital or technology issues including Shreya Singhal v. Union of India (Section 66A), Subramanium Swamy v. Union of India (criminal defamation), Gaurav Sureshbhai Vyas v. State of Gujarat (Internet Shutdowns), Justice Puttaswamy v. Union of India (Right to Privacy and Aadhaar), PUCL v. Union of India (Surveillance Reforms), Anuradha Bhasin v. Union of India (Internet Shutdowns), Indian Kanoon v. Karthik Theodore (Right to be Forgotten) and X Corp. v. Union of India (Sahyog Censorship Portal).

He has represented the India Chapter of Friday's for Future when their website was blocked under terrorism charges. His representations for journalists include Paranjoy Guha Thakurta and Sucheta Dalal against large corporations in cases of defamation. In April 2026, he was a counsel in a case in which the Delhi High Court directed the restoration of a political satirist's suspended social media account.

== Digital Rights Advocacy ==
He is a co-founder of the SaveTheInternet.in campaign on net neutrality and SaveOurPrivacy.in campaign for data protection and surveillance reforms. After his work on the Section 66A case, he co-authored a study to document compliance with the judgement to discover ongoing cases which continued unconstitutionally against the Supreme Court judgement. This was called, "shocking" by the Supreme Court. Gupta is the co-founder of the Internet Freedom Foundation (IFF) and was appointed its first executive director from 2018 till November 2023. He resumed the role of IFF's Founder Director in November, 2024. For his work at IFF he was awarded the Ashoka Fellowship in 2019 and the Next Now Fellowship. Gupta also filed a case as a petitioner against the Ministry of Home Affairs for disclosure of statistical data on surveillance in India. He has deposed before a parliamentary committee on the DNA Bill and before a commission inquiring into the use of Pegasus. On 31 May 2023, he presented Item #7 at the Annual meeting of shareholders of META Platforms titled as, "Shareholder Proposal Regarding Report on Allegations of Political Entanglement and Content Management Biases in India" that was defeated with 5% votes in its favour. He frequently works on areas of personal autonomy and rights and has advocated against directive on the mandatory installation of the Sanchar Saathi App and the Broadcasting Bill, 2024 which were rolled back by the Government of India.

== Writing and Lectures ==
Gupta authored the Commentary on the Information Technology Act which is published by LexisNexis. He writes regularly on digital and democratic rights in leading newspapers and is quoted as an expert in India. Gupta is published in reviewed journals like the Indian Journal of Law and Technology, Seminar and the India International Center Quarterly. He has delivered the 11th Krishna Raj Memorial Lecture at the 37th Annual Dr. Ramanatham Memorial Meeting (with Jinee Lokaneeta) and also started a YouTube channel, 1984 to take forward the discourse on digital policy.

== Awards and recognition ==
- Forbes India : 30 under 30 (2014)
- Ashoka Fellowship (2019)
- Agami Shamnad Basheer Citizenship Prize : Special Mention (2020)
- ROW 100 : Global Tech's Changemakers (2022)
- Global Privacy Assembly, Privacy and Human Rights Award (2025)
- Tech Policy Press Fellowship (2026)

== See also ==
- Articles by Apar Gupta
- The Seen and the Unseen : Apar Gupta Fights the Good Fight
- 1984 by Apar Gupta
