= Automated Facial Recognition System (India) =

Indian government agency

The national Automated Facial Recognition System (AFRS) or the National Automated Facial Recognition System (NAFRS) is a facial recognition system designed to identify, track, and capture criminals in India.

== History ==
On 8 July 2019, the National Crime Records Bureau (NCRB) invited bids to create and establish the AFRS protocol through a 172-page document, which stated that "this is an effort in the direction of modernizing the police force, information gathering, criminal identification, verification and its dissemination among various police organizations and units across the country." The NCRB, state police forces, and the Ministry of Home Affairs would be the beneficiaries.

The intention to establish a country-wide facial recognition system stemmed from a trial run of a facial recognition software used by the Delhi police in April 2018 to identify and rescue 3,000 missing children in four days.

== Controversies ==
Internet Freedom Foundation (IFF), a non-profit organisation based in New Delhi, filed a legal notice with the NCRB stating that the AFRS would cause digital privacy concerns for the nation's citizens. NCRB responded stating that AFRS "only automates the existing police procedure of comparing suspects’ photos with those listed in LEA’s [Law Enforcement Agency] databases.”
