= Shreyas =

- Pronunciation: sh-rey-yes
- Gender: male
- Language: Tamil, Hindi, Kannada, Avestan, Marathi

Origin
- Origin: Shreyas
- Meaning: "prosperity"
- Region of origin: Southern India

Other names
- Variant forms: Shreyash, Shreeyas, Shreyaas, Shreyes, Sreyas
- Derived: Lord Vishnu or Lord Ganesha

Shreyas is an Indian male name that means "prosperity," "wellbeing," "virtuous" or "superior".

Notable people with the name include:

- Shreyas Talpade (born 1976), Indian actor
- Shreyas Gopal (born 1993), Indian cricketer
- Shreyas Iyer (born 1994), Indian cricketer
- Shreyas Ketkar (born 2003), Indian footballer
- Shreyas Movva (born 1993), Canadian cricketer

== See also ==
- Shreya
- Shriya
