= St. Stanislaus High School =

Location
- 65, Hill Road; Bandra; Mumbai, Maharashtra 400050; India
- 19°3′15″N 72°49′46″E

Information
- Type: Private primary and secondary school
- Motto: Latin: Natus ad Maiora (Born for Greater Things)
- Religious affiliation: Catholicism
- Denomination: Jesuits
- Patron saint: Stanislaus Kostka
- Established: 1863; 163 years ago
- Authority: Maharashtra State Board of Education
- Principal: Sister Arocia
- Grades: 1-10
- Gender: Boys
- Enrollment: 2,300
- Campus size: 7 acres (2.8 ha)
- Houses: Britto (red), Loyola (yellow), Xavier (blue), Kostka (green)
- Website: stanislausbandra.in

St. Stanislaus High School is a private primary and secondary school for boys located in Bandra, Mumbai, Maharashtra, India. Established in 1863 by German Jesuit priests as an orphanage, it has since evolved into a comprehensive institution serving both day students and boarders, with over 2,300 students from kindergarten to grade 10. The school is spread over a campus of approximately seven acres (three hectares), making it one of the largest schools (by area) in Mumbai.

== Principals ==
The following individuals have served as principal of the school:

| Ordinal | Officeholder | Term start | Term end | Time in office |
|---|---|---|---|---|
| 1 | Fr. Joe D'Abreo, SJ | 1985 | 1990 | ?? years |
| 2 | Fr. Edmund Carrasco, SJ | 1991 | 1996 | 5–6 years |
| 3 | Fr. Lawrie Ferrao, SJ | 1996 | 2007 | 10–11 years |
| 4 | Fr. Jude Fernandes, SJ | 2007 | 2015 | 7–8 years |
| 5 | Anna Correa | 2015 | 2021 | 5–6 years |
| 6 | Sr. Arockiammal Anthony | 2021 | incumbent | |

== Notable alumni ==
The Stanislaus Ex-students Association was started by Fr. Joseph Casasayas SJ in 1936. It is a not-for-profit organization aimed at assisting alumni (ex-students and ex-staff members) to network.

- Arbaaz Khan, Bollywood actor
- Anthony de Mello, priest and author
- Cardinal Ivan Dias, cardinal of the Roman Catholic Church
- Dinesh D'Souza, conservative US commentator
- Faisal Farooqui, founder and CEO, MouthShut.com
- Lt. General Francis Dias, PVSM, AVSM, VrC (Retd.) Indian Army
- Marcellus Gomes, represented India at the Olympic Games
- Prakash Yashwant Ambedkar, politician
- Sagarika, singer and actress
- Salman Khan, Bollywood actor
- Shaan, singer, actor and television presenter.
- Sohail Khan, Bollywood actor
- Flt. Lt. Lawrence Frederic Pereira, VrC. Indian Air Force
- Viren Rasquinha, former captain of India men's national field hockey team

== See also ==
- List of Jesuit schools
- List of schools in Maharashtra
- Violence against Christians in India
