= Suhas Katti v. Tamil Nadu =

Cyber crime case in India

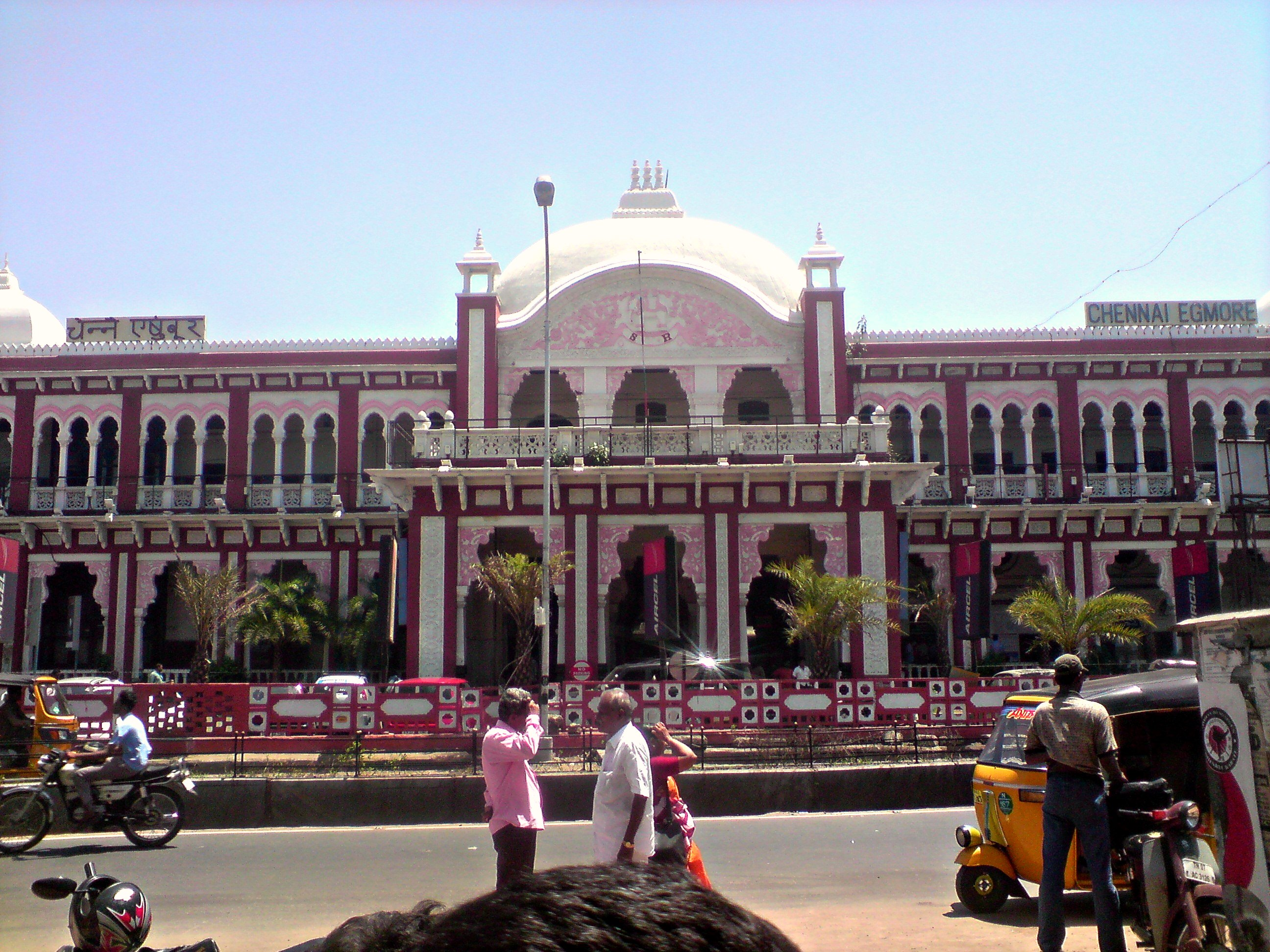
- Egmore Railway station
- Court: Metropolitan Magistrate, Egmore
- Full case name: Suhas Katti v. Tamil Nadu
- Decided: November 5, 2004

Suhas Katti v. Tamil Nadu was the first case in India where a conviction was handed down in connection with the posting of obscene messages on the internet under the controversial section 67 of the Information Technology Act, 2000. The case was filed in February 2004 and In a short span of about seven months from the filing of the FIR, the Chennai Cyber Crime Cell achieved the conviction . In the case, a woman complained to the police about a man who was sending her obscene, defamatory and annoying messages in a Yahoo message group. The accused also forwarded emails received in a fake account opened by him in the victim's name. The victim also received phone calls by people who believed she was soliciting for sex work.

== Facts ==
After the victim made the complaint in February 2004, the police traced the accused, who was the victim's friend, to Mumbai and arrested him. The police found the accused was interested in marrying the victim but she turned him down and married someone else instead. The marriage, however, ended in divorce, which is when the accused started contacting the victim again but she rejected him again. The accused then started harassing the victim online. On March 24, 2004, a chargesheet was filed under section 67 of the IT Act 2000, 469 and 509 IPC before the metropolitan magistrate in Egmore, Chennai. The defence argued that the offending mails were sent either by the victim's husband or by herself to implicate the accused. On November 5, 2004, the magistrate found the accused guilty of offences under section 469, 509 IPC and 67 of IT Act 2000. He was sentenced to rigorous imprisonment for 2 years under 469 IPC and to pay a fine of Rs.500/-, one year simple imprisonment and Rs 500 fine under 509 IPC and two years imprisonment with a fine of Rs 4,000 under section 67 of IT Act 2000. All sentences were to run concurrently.

== More information ==
Section 67 in The Information Technology Act, 2000

[ 67 Punishment for publishing or transmitting obscene material in electronic form. -Whoever publishes or transmits or causes to be published or transmitted in the electronic form, any material which is lascivious or appeals to the prurient interest or if its effect is such as to tend to deprave and corrupt persons who are likely, having regard to all relevant circumstances, to read, see or hear the matter contained or embodied in it, shall be punished on first conviction with imprisonment of either description for a term which may extend to three years and with fine which may extend to five lakh rupees and in the event of second or subsequent conviction with imprisonment of either description for a term which may extend to five years and also with fine which may extend to ten lakh rupees. ]

The case is also significant for having introduced electronic evidence under Section 65B of the Indian Evidence Act for the first time in a Court, where a certified copy of the electronic document present on Yahoo server was produced by a private techno legal consultant, not being part of a Government forensic lab, and was accepted as the prime evidence of crime. The role of a private person as an "Expert" and the "Validity of Section 65B of Indian Evidence Act" were examined and validated in the trial.

During the trial conviction was also brought on the concept of "Forgery" of an electronic document under Indian Penal Code when a person writes his name below a message intending the recipient to consider it as a message sent by that person.

== Impact ==
The impact of the case was far reaching and set a benchmark for the courts and inspired people to lodge cases related to harassment on the internet. Section 67 subsequently ran into controversy after the government used the section to enforce a partial ban on pornography in India with activists questioning the vague definition of "obscene" in the provision that could be used to curtail any sexually explicit material.

The Case also brought out the responsibilities of an intermediary like a Cyber Cafe in maintaining a visitor's register and its importance as evidence.

The case validated the concept of production of electronic evidence through Section 65B certification without the production of the original hard disk containing the document.
