= Apar =

Apar may refer to:

- Apar (album), an album by Spanish dance band Delorean
- MV Apar, an Empire F type coaster in service with Gaselee & Son Ltd, London, 1960–74
- Apar Gupta, an Indian lawyer
- Southern three-banded armadillo, a species of armadillo

APAR may refer to:

- Active Phased Array Radar, a shipborne multi-function radar
- Authorized Program Analysis Report, in IBM nomenclature, a problem officially recognized and diagnosed by IBM's support department.

== See also ==
- Appar, 7th-century Tamil poet-saint
