= Mouthshut.com versus Union of India =

Indian court case concerning freedom of speech and expression on the Internet

- Court: Supreme Court of India
- Full case name: MouthShut.com and Faisal Farooqui versus Union of India and Ors
- Decided: March 24th, 2015

MouthShut.com versus Union of India was a writ petition filed by Mouthshut.com, a consumer review social media company, and its founder Faisal Farooqui, to protect freedom of speech and expression on the Internet. In this case, they challenged Sec. 66A and sought modifications or nullification of IT Rules and Section 79 of the Information Technology Act of India. This case was pivotal in determining the responsibility of intermediaries for online speech in India. On 24 March 2015, the Supreme Court issued a judgment in favor of the petitioner(s) and nullified Sec. 66A, deeming it unconstitutional. It also ordered the reading down of various other sections of the IT Act, including section 79 and the IT Rules. Consequently, individuals are free to post anything online, and publishers cannot be compelled to remove content without a court order. This decision applies to all user-generated content on the Internet.

== Importance ==
Online intermediaries, internet service providers (ISPs), telecom service providers, and social media companies in India and abroad closely monitored the lawsuit and its proceedings. The Center for Communication Governance noted that this case is significant for India's Supreme Court, as it will establish the boundaries of free speech online. CNN reported that prior to the verdict, Mouthshut.com had raised its concerns to the Indian Supreme Court, claiming that it aimed to safeguard the rights of Indian citizens and consumers as outlined by the Indian constitution.

== Background ==
In April 2013, MouthShut.com submitted petitions to the Supreme Court of India, challenging the severe consequences of Sec. 66A and requesting the nullification or alteration of India's Information Technology Rules 2011. The website filed a writ petition under Article 32 of the Constitution, arguing that the IT Rules contravened Articles 14, 19, and 21 of the Constitution of India and violated users' fundamental right to freedom of expression by preventing them from posting reviews. MouthShut.com claimed that the IT Rules imposed a significant burden by necessitating content screening and online censorship. The petitioners were not qualified to make determinations on whether certain content was defamatory or infringed on copyright as such decisions were typically made by judges with factual inquiry and careful consideration of competing interests and factors. The petitioners receive notices and phone calls from cyber cells and police stations asking them to delete content and provide information of users, which makes the running of their business difficult.

== Judgement ==
Supreme Court of India repealed Sec. 66A of IT Act and wrote down Sec. 79 and Rules, in a verdict on 24 March 2015, in favor of the petitioners after hearing the matter of clubbed petitions by a two-judge bench comprising Justice Jasti Chelameswar and Justice Rohinton Fali Nariman.
