= Faisal Farooqui =

Indian entrepreneur

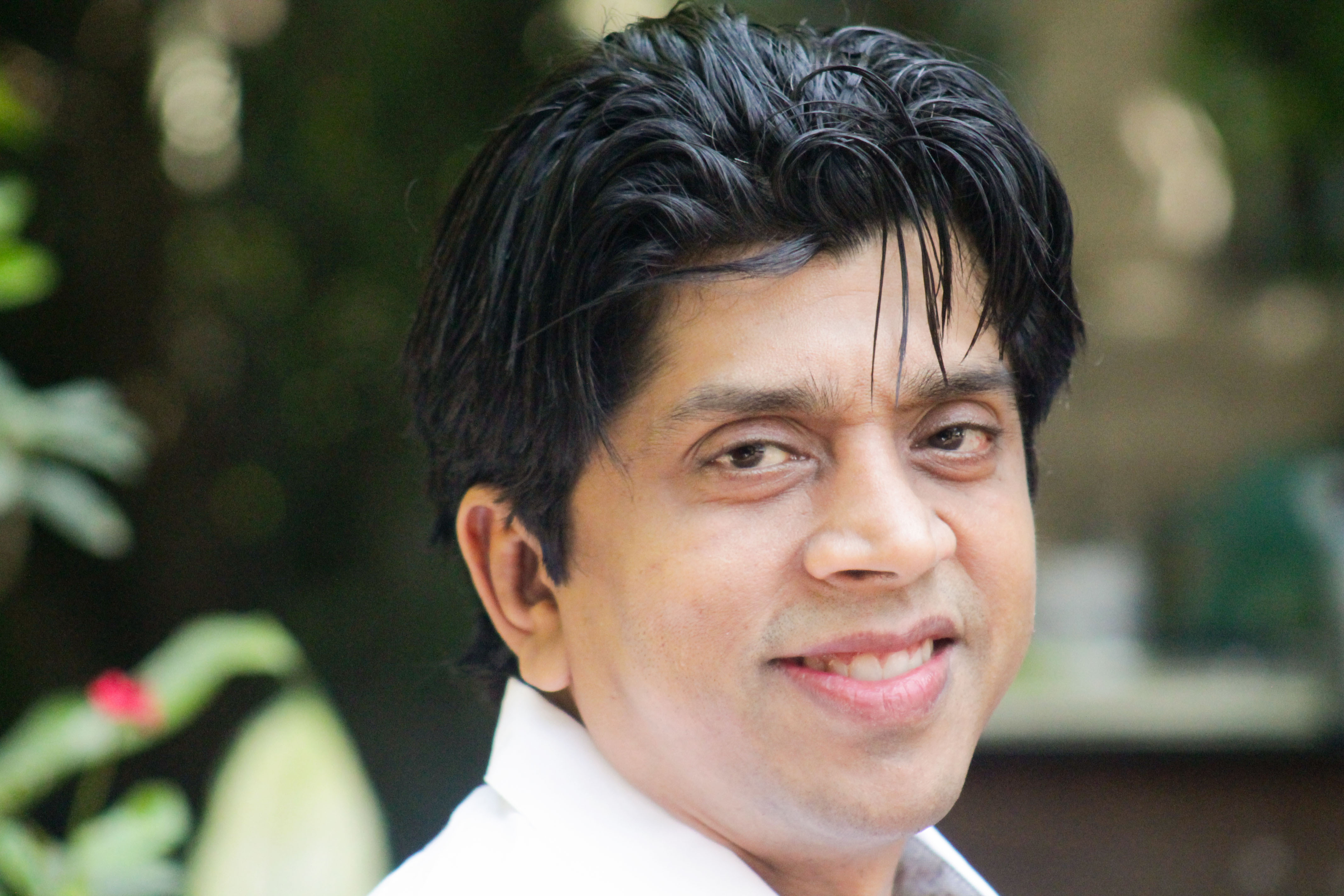
- Born: Mumbai, Maharashtra
- Education: State University of New York at Binghamton (B.S.)
- Occupations: Businessman; Investor; Founder & CEO of Mouthshut.com
- Awards: Young Leaders by British High Commission

Faisal Farooqui is an Indian technology entrepreneur, investor, and digital rights activist. He is the founder and CEO of MouthShut.com, a consumer review and ratings platform established in 2000. Known for building early large-scale systems for user-generated content in India, his work emphasizes data privacy, encryption, and scalable infrastructure. He co-founded Zarca Interactive, the parent company of Sogolytics and K12Insight and was an early investor in the agritech platform DeHaat.

Farooqui was a lead petitioner in the 2015 Supreme Court of India case that resulted in the striking down of Section 66A of the Information Technology Act. In 2022, he authored In the Shadow of a Legend: Dilip Kumar, a memoir detailing his decades-long relationship with the actor.

== Early life and education ==
Faisal Farooqui was born in Mumbai, India, as the youngest of ten children to Idris Farooqui and Tahera Farooqui. His father, originally a farmer, came from a land-owning family whose ancestors had rebelled against British colonial rule in 1857. He later established bakeries in Mumbai, expanding the traditional joint family business. Farooqui attended St. Stanislaus High School in Bandra and completed his higher secondary education at Jai Hind College, Mumbai. He later moved to the United States, where he earned a Bachelor's degree in Information Systems and Finance from the State University of New York at Binghamton.

During his time at university, he was elected to the Faculty Senate Committee and student government, and served as technology editor of the campus newspaper, Pipe Dream. Farooqui developed an interest in computing during his school years. In 1988, he encountered a computerized railway reservation system at Mumbai's Chhatrapati Shivaji Maharaj Terminus, which encouraged him to explore programming. He began experimenting with BASIC on a Casio SF-3500 digital diary, later gained access to an IBM-compatible PC at school, and worked with database tools such as dBASE IV while developing a system to manage surgical records for a family member. He worked on MS-DOS and Unix environments and learned COBOL and other early programming languages.

== Career ==
Farooqui began his career as a telecommunications consultant at American Management Systems in the U.S. In 2000, he returned to India to found MouthShut.com with approximately ₹1.2 million in seed capital. To manage costs during the dot-com downturn, the company avoided venture capital and used non-traditional marketing, such as advertising on auto-rickshaws. In 2001, he introduced the Dial-the-CEO feature on the platform that allowed users to connect directly with the company CEO. Similar consumer-engagement models were later adopted by other businesses.

In 2007, Farooqui launched Dekhona.com, a localized video platform. The standalone service was later discontinued due to operational costs, and its underlying technology was integrated into MouthShut to support video-based reviews. In 2011, he beta-launched Dealface.com, an SMS-based coupon service for local businesses, which was subsequently merged into MouthShut.

=== Auto rickshaw advertising ===
Farooqui is often credited with pioneering of auto-rickshaw advertising in India. Starting in 2001, he negotiated directly with drivers to paint the MouthShut.com URL on vehicle hoods as a low-cost alternative to traditional media. The campaign expanded from Mumbai to Bangalore and Delhi in 2006. According to the Hindustan Times, the visibility of these ads contributed to the wider adoption of transit media by larger Indian corporations by 2007.

=== Other ventures ===
In 2003, Farooqui co-founded Zarca Interactive with his brothers, Suhail and Hamid. The company provided enterprise feedback and customer-experience solutions. Its products and operations later expanded through subsidieries Sogolytics and K12Insight, where Farooqui serves as a board member.

== Legal activism and public policy ==
Farooqui has been active in public policy discussions regarding digital rights and intermediary liability in India.

=== Section 66A and IT Rules ===
In 2013, Farooqui and MouthShut.com filed a writ petition under Article 32 of the Constitution of India challenging provisions of the Information Technology (Intermediary Guidelines) Rules, 2011. The petition argued that the rules required intermediaries to assess the legality of user-generated content without judicial oversight, which, according to the petitioners, led to excessive content removal. The filing cited multiple takedown requests and legal notices received by the platform, including claims from private entities seeking the removal of negative reviews.

The petition was heard alongside other challenges to Section 66A of the Information Technology Act. In March 2015, the Supreme Court of India struck down Section 66A as unconstitutional, holding that it violated the right to freedom of speech and expression under Article 19(1)(a). The court also clarified the conditions under which intermediaries are required to remove online content, limiting such obligations to cases involving court orders or government notifications.

=== Net Neutrality and IST Reform ===
During the 2015 national debate on net neutrality, Farooqui publicly supported the principle of non-discriminatory data access. He has also been associated with Project MoreSunlight, which advocates advancing Indian Standard Time by 30 minutes to GMT +06:00 to improve energy efficiency.

=== Community initiatives ===
In 2017, Farooqui co-founded the Save Joggers Park campaign, which opposed the redevelopment of a public green space in Bandra, Mumbai. He has also served as visiting faculty at institutions including the Indian Institute of Management Ahmedabad and Jamia Millia Islamia.

== Association with Dilip Kumar ==
Farooqui maintained a long-standing friendship with the actor Dilip Kumar, originating from decades-long association between their families. He managed the actor's official social-media presence, including his Twitter handle launched in 2011, and has served as a spokesperson for the family. Farooqui has described Kumar as a mentor and father figure. In 2022, he published a memoir about the actor titled In the Shadow of a Legend: Dilip Kumar, which focuses on the actor's private life and personal principles.

== Controversies ==
Pune-based Kumar builders sent a legal notice to Faisal and MouthShut.com and demanded Rs.2000 crore damages for fake reviews appearing on MouthShut.com about them.

Institute of Management and Technical Studies sent a legal notice to Faisal for fake review post on his website MouthShut about the institute. It alleged that the reviews were intended to bring the institute's reliability down.

=== IT Act/Section 66A ===
Faisal was among the lead petitioners who challenged the sections of IT Act section 66 A through a petition in the Supreme Court of India in 2013. In 2015, the court struck down 66A, holding it unconstitutional and diluting many other sections.

Faisal's firm MouthShut has received 790 takedown notices, 240 legal notices, and 11 court cases against it. Hence, Farooqui and Mouthshut.com decided to challenge these notices by petitioning the Supreme Court of India to read down the Intermediary Guidelines Rules 2011.

In 2014, Beam Fiber, an ISP in Hyderabad and Bangalore blocked access to Mouthshut.com. Farooqui challenged this illegal block and Beam Fiber later unblocked its access with an apology.

== Board membership ==
- Board of Governors, Software Freedom Law Center (SFLC)
- Committee, Ghalib Institute, Delhi
- Convenor, MoreSunlight
- Founding Member, Lead Angels Investment
- Charter Member, The Indus Entrepreneurs (TiE)

== Philanthropy ==
Farooqui is a founding trustee of the Tahera & Idris Farooqui Foundation, a family-run charitable organization. The foundation's initiatives focus on education, healthcare, and rural development. During the COVID-19 pandemic in India, the foundation distributed medical supplies and essential goods to underserved communities.

== Awards and honors ==
- Named as one of the 50 Indian's in list of Young Leaders by British High Commission
- Mentioned as one of the first Indian dotcom founders of the 21^{st} century
- Received the Dr. Kalam Startup Award from the Bharatiya Janata Party (BJP)
- Manthan Award for Best Youth website

== Bibliography ==
- Farooqui, Faisal (2022). Dilip Kumar : In the Shadow of a Legend (A Biography). India: Om Books International. ISBN 978-9392834660.
- Application of market research towards proactive customer relationship management
- "Application of market research towards proactive customer relationship management | WARC". origin.warc.com. Archived from the original on 12 August 2022.
