= Sanchar Saathi =

Indian state-owned app and web portal

Sanchar Saathi transl. Telecommunications Buddy
- Developer: Department of Telecommunications
- Release: May 2023
- Operating system: Android and iOS
- Type: Cybersecurity, surveillance (alleged)
- Website: sancharsaathi.gov.in

Sanchar Saathi (transl. Telecommunications Buddy) is an Indian state-owned app and web portal, operated by the Department of Telecommunications and designed to assist Indian mobile users in tracking and blocking stolen or lost mobile devices. In November 2025, a government order requiring Sanchar Saathi to be pre-installed on all mobile devices sold nationwide, with explicit provisions on preventing users from deleting the app or disabling any of its broad functionalities, prompted widespread criticism. The order was subsequently withdrawn.

== Background ==
The Telecommunications Act 2023 introduced a broad definition of the term "telecommunications" and conferred wide-ranging powers on the government. Although the Department of Telecommunications (DoT) stated that this definition would not be used to justify government overreach, a November 2024 amendment to the Telecom Cyber Security Rules expanded it further and introduced the concept of the Telecommunication Identifier User Entity (TIEU), enabling users to be personally identified through their phone numbers.

Sanchar Saathi was launched amid a widespread rise in cybercrime and hacking, as part of the Indian government's effort to prevent stolen phones from being used for fraud and to promote a state-backed application. In an official statement, the DoT said, "India has [a] big second-hand mobile device market. Cases have also been observed where stolen or blacklisted devices are being re-sold. It makes the purchaser [an] abettor in [the] crime and causes financial loss to them."

== Launch ==
Sanchar Saathi was launched as a web portal in May 2023. It was later launched as a mobile app in January 2025. Describing itself as a "citizen-centric" safety tool, Sanchar Saathi allows users to check a device's IMEI, report and block lost or stolen phones, and flag suspected fraud communications. Under Sanchar Saathi's privacy policy, the app may make calls and read call logs, send and view messages, and access the device's storage, location, and camera.

According to official government data, by December 2025, the Sanchar Saathi app had helped recover more than 700,000 lost and stolen mobile devices across India. Users report around 2,000 fraud incidents through the app each day.

== Pre-installation controversy ==
On 28 November 2025, the Bharatiya Janata Party government, led by prime minister Narendra Modi, privately ordered phone manufacturers, including Apple, Samsung, Xiaomi, Vivo, Oppo, among others, to pre-install the Sanchar Saathi app on new devices sold in the country, alongside mandating that old devices get issued a software update for the installation of the app. The order carried a 90-day deadline and contained explicit provisions requiring the app to be visible and accessible to users upon first use or device setup, with no possibility of deletion, disabling, or restriction of any of its broad functions.

The order caused widespread political backlash. K. C. Venugopal, a general secretary of the main opposition party, the Indian National Congress, called the order "beyond unconstitutional" and characterised it as a dystopian surveillance tool, stating, "Big Brother cannot watch us." Another Congress general secretary, Priyanka Gandhi, termed Sanchar Saathi a "snooping app" and accused the government of steering the country towards dictatorship. Uddhav Thackeray, former chief minister of Maharashtra, compared Sanchar Saathi to the Pegasus spyware. Sanjay Hegde, a senior advocate at the Supreme Court of India, argued that the order used security as a pretext for an intrusion that was "vast, unfettered, unguided and [...] totally disproportionate", and called for the app to be struck down on those grounds. The Internet Freedom Foundation (IFF), an Indian digital rights advocacy organisation, said, "Forcing every smartphone to carry a permanent government app for a simple verification task is excessive and violates the Puttaswamy proportionality standard", referring to Puttaswamy v. Union of India, a 2017 landmark decision of the Supreme Court, which asserted that the right to privacy should be protected as a fundamental right. As per the IFF's findings, the app would "almost certainly" need root or system-level access, comparable to that of carrier or manufacturer applications, in order to prevent it from being disabled. In doing so, Sanchar Saathi would strip away usual security mechanisms, making it possible for it to access other applications' data. Thus, it would have to be embedded permanently within the phone's operating system. The IFF also warned that, despite being advertised merely as an IMEI verification tool, Sanchar Saathi could, through server-side updates, enable functions such as client side scanning for banned applications, flagging VPN usage, or trawling through SIM activity or SMS logs.

In reaction to the controversy, Jyotiraditya Scindia, the union minister of communications, dismissed allegations of snooping or call monitoring, comparing Sanchar Saathi to other pre-installed mobile apps such as Google Maps, which he said could be deleted if users wished to do so. However, contrary to Scindia's statement, on many phone brands, such pre-installed apps cannot be deleted, although users can disable them. Furthermore, upon enquiry, Scindia did not clarify whether his remarks applied to the app after the order took effect, making no comment on the provision in the order that would prevent users from deleting the app. When Congress member Renuka Chowdhury submitted an adjournment motion notice in the Rajya Sabha seeking the suspension of all other matters to discuss the Sanchar Saathi issue, Kiren Rijiju, the union minister of parliamentary affairs, accused the opposition of "manufacturing issues" to stall session proceedings.

By 2 December, it had been reported that Apple did not plan to comply with the order, citing privacy and security concerns for the iOS ecosystem and the fact that the order would violate its internal policy against the pre-installation of third-party software in iPhones. Although it was clarified that Apple did not intend to take the matter to court or publicly oppose the government, it was said that Apple "can't do this. Period." The order would have also required Google to create a custom version of Android solely for India which would include the Sanchar Saathi app, a requirement described to "not be acceptable to the company". Following the backlash, the order was revoked on 3 December 2025. In a press release, the government said, "Given Sanchar Saathi's increasing acceptance, Government has decided not to make the pre-installation mandatory for mobile manufacturers".

== See also ==
- Mass surveillance in India
- Pegasus Project revelations in India
