= Meera Vijayann =

American-Indian journalist covering gender-based violence

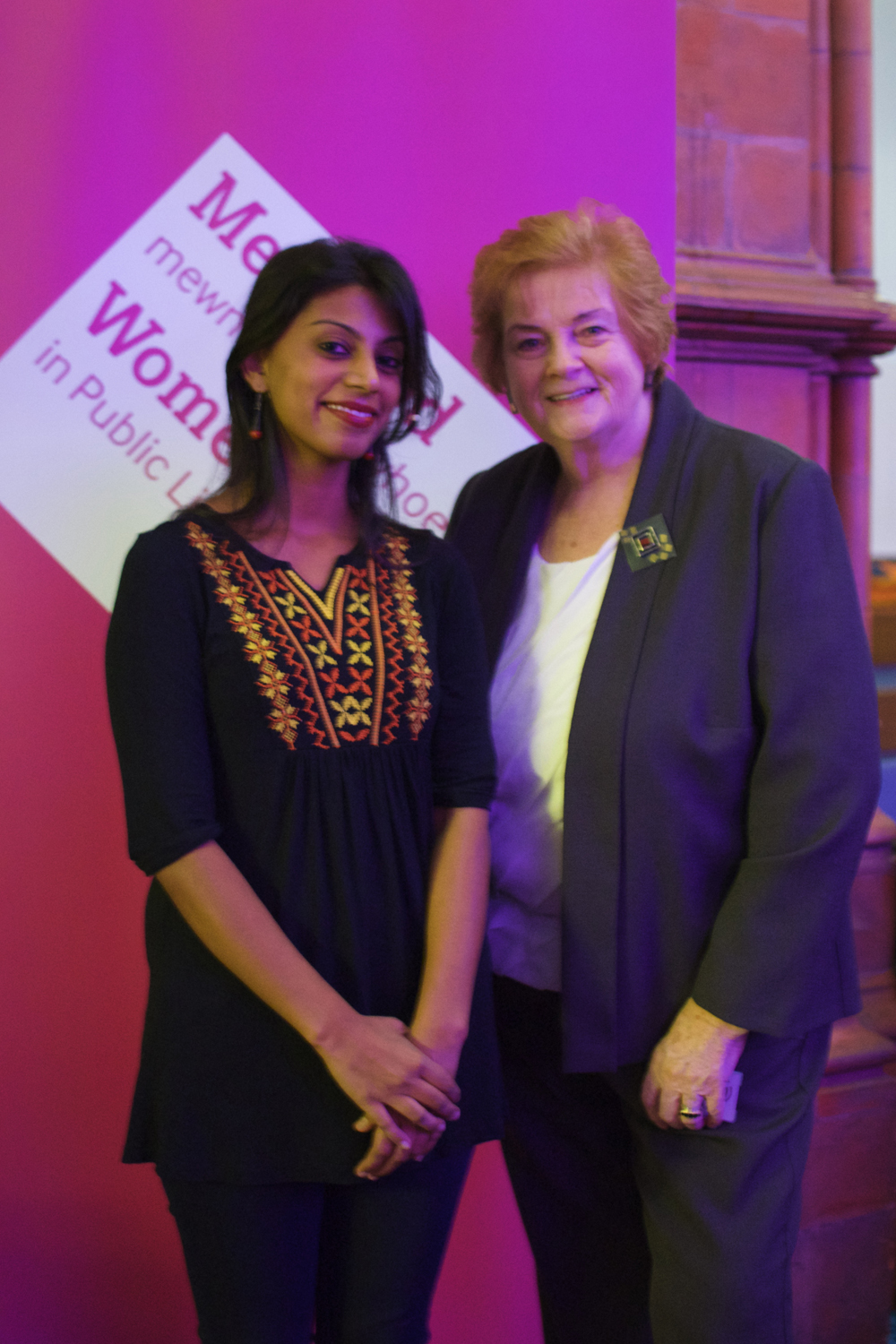
Meera Vijayann, left, at Senedd Cymru – Welsh Parliament; November 2014

Meera Vijayann is an American-Indian journalist covering gender-based violence and social entrepreneurship. She holds the position of communications manager and co-coordinator at Ashoka, Arlington, Virginia and youth ambassador for India with Youth to End Social Violence in Conflict.

== Career ==
Meera used digital media in creative ways to empower, aware and educate young people about the issues of sexual violence. Her articles and blog posts have appeared in media outlets including Forbes, The Guardian, The Deccan Herald, The Huffington Post, CNN, IBN LIVE, Open Democracy and The New Indian Express. She wrote "I Don't Want To Be Just A Survivor: Moving On From An Acid Attack" in which she talks about the attitude of society towards acid attack victims. "Empowering Indian Dads To End Gender Inequality At Home" is about how empathy can empower men to reduce gender-based violence. An updated list of her publications can be found on her site.

== Recognition ==
In 2013, she won the CNN-IBN Citizen Journalism Award for her reporting of the protest that followed the 2012 Delhi gang rape. She presented a talk on 'Finding a voice against sexual violence' at TEDx House of Parliament in London and at the National Assembly of Wales and contributed at the United Nations Foundation as a Plus Social good reporter. She is a 'youth ambassador for India'.

In 2021, she won a $10 000 writing prize as one of four winners of the Medium Writers Challenge.

== See also ==
- Vidyut Gore, Indian blogger exposing domestic violence
