= Shreya Singhal =

Indian lawyer

- Education: University of Bristol, Campus Law Centre, Faculty of Law, University of Delhi
- Known for: Fight for Freedom of Speech on the Internet
- Relatives: Late Justice Sunanda Bhandare (grandmother); MC Bhandare (grandfather)

Shreya Singhal is an Indian lawyer. Her fight against Section 66A of the Information Technology Act of 2000 in 2015 brought her to national prominence in India.

== Early life and education ==
She was born into a family of eminent lawyers. Her Great-grandfather, H. R. Gokhale, was a veteran Congress leader and former Law Minister during The Emergency (1975–1977). Her Grandmother, Justice Sunanda Bhandare, was a judge of the Delhi High Court and a distinguished lawyer. Her Grandfather, Shri M.C. Bhandare, is a Senior Advocate, former Member of Parliament and former Governor of Odisha. Her mother, Manali Bhandare, is a lawyer practicing at the Supreme Court of India.

She completed her schooling from the Vasant Valley School in New Delhi in 2009, after which she went to pursue Astrophysics at the University of Bristol in the United Kingdom. She subsequently enrolled at the Campus Law Centre, Faculty of Law at Delhi University, where she graduated in 2016.

== Section 66A and restriction of free speech ==
Section 66A of the IT Act, 2000 provided for punishment for sending offensive messages through communication service, etc. Any person who sends, by means of a computer resource or a communication device -

(a) any information that is grossly offensive or has menacing character; or

(b) any information which he knows to be false, but for the purpose of causing annoyance, inconvenience, danger, obstruction, insult, injury, criminal intimidation, enmity, hatred or ill will, persistently by making use of such computer resource or a communication device; or

(c) any electronic mail or electronic mail message for the purpose of causing annoyance or inconvenience or to deceive or to mislead the addressee or recipient about the origin of such messages, shall be punishable with imprisonment for a term which may extend to three years and with fine.

Before 2015, Government of India restricted freedom of speech for avoiding self-harm and misuse. This allowed arrest of any person which the law per see as harmful or misuse.

In 2012, Shreya filed a Public Interest Litigation in the Supreme Court of India against the Act. In 2015, a division bench of the Supreme Court struck down Section 66A of Information Technology Act, 2000. This was hailed as a major step in the country's quest for freedom of speech and expression.

== See also ==
- Mouthshut.com v. Union of India
- Information Technology Act, 2000
