= Madhukeshwar Desai =

Indian lawyer and politician

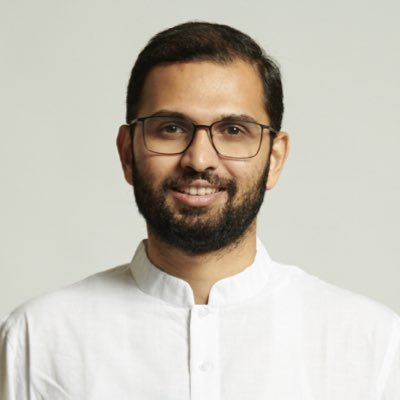
- Desai in 2017

Vice President Bharatiya Janata Yuva Morcha
- Incumbent
- Assumed office 2013

Personal details
- Born: 25 August 1987 (age 39) Mumbai
- Party: Bharatiya Janata Party
- Education: Christ College
- Profession: Lawyer

Madhukeshwar Desai (born 25 August 1987) is an Indian lawyer and politician; he is the great-grandson of former Prime Minister of India Morarji Desai. In 2013, he was appointed the National Vice President of the Bharatiya Janata Yuva Morcha, the youth wing of the Bharatiya Janata Party at 25, making him the youngest vice president in the history of the party. He was re-appointed as a National Vice President for a second and third term in 2017 and 2021.

Madhukeshwar set up the Mumbai Centre for International Arbitration in 2016 and currently serves as its CEO. He was named one of the 50 most influential young Indians for the year 2017 by GQ Magazine. His journey was captured in a biographical account along with eight political leaders in the book, 'The Young And the Restless' and subsequently in the book, 'India Tomorrow: Conversations with the Next Generation of Political Leaders' by authors, Prof. Pradeep Chhibber and Harsh Shah.

The World Economic Forum named Madhukeshwar one of the 100 Young Global Leaders for the year 2023.

== Personal life ==
Madhukeshwar Desai did his schooling from G.D Somani and Kensri School, subsequently completing his education in Law from Christ College, Bangalore.

Madhukeshwar married Sneha Menon Desai a journalist by profession who hails from Bangalore. They have a son. The couple currently resides in Mumbai.

== Political life ==
Madhukeshwar is the great grandson of former Prime Minister of India, Morarji Desai.

The legacy of India's first non-congress Prime Minister was claimed by both The Indian National Congress and the Bharatiya Janata Party. Prior to his entry into Indian Politics he was approached by both major political parties in India. He chose the BJP because of its ideology and is considered to be a close ally of current Prime Minister of India, Narendra Modi.

While in College, he organised student events under the name, The Young Leaders Collective which focused on political sensitization and student related issues.

In 2011, he started working with the Bharatiya Janata Party, informally. Madhukeshwar accompanied Shri L. K. Advani on his Jan Chetana Yatra for 40 days across 23 states. He assisted in the form of researching and writing on the topic of black money, corruption and inflation for his speeches as well as contributed towards the white paper on black money subsequently. He was appointed National Vice President of the BJYM in May 2013, the youngest in the history of the party and given the charge of Bihar. He toured extensively across Bihar, strengthening the organization at the grass root level &amp; fulfilled this role until 2015, after which he was given the charge of Kerala. Besides working in Karnataka, Gujarat and Bihar, for the 2014 General elections, he worked specifically in the Mumbai North Central Lok Sabha constituency, which the BJP won for the first time in the history of the party. The BJP rewarded Madhukeshwar for his work, and re appointed him National Vice President of the BJYM in 2017 for a second consecutive term.

Madhukeshwar was part of the core team responsible for bringing Global Citizen Festival to Mumbai. The event saw a crowd attendance of over 80,000 people, with over 5.8 Billion US Dollars committed towards the United Nations Sustainable Development Goals. The headline acts for the Festival were Coldplay and Jay Z. The prime minister of India, Narendra Modi also addressed the festival.

In 2017, Madhukeshwar was elected vice chair of the International Young Democrat Union. the IYDU is a union of 71 democratic countries, bringing together young leaders from across the world. With his election to the IYDU board, this will be the first time that India will find representation at this forum.

Madhukeshwar's YouTube interview with comedian Kunal Kamra went viral on the internet in 2017, creating a new genre of political communication.

Madhukeshwar was included in the Lok Sabha strategy committee for the 2019 General elections by BJP National President, Amit Shah.

During the 2019 elections, Priyanka Sharma a BJYM activist in Kolkata was illegally arrested for sharing a meme of West Bengal Chief Minister, Mamata Banerjee on Facebook. Madhukeshwar and his team filed a petition in the Supreme Court of India, challenging her arrest, leading to her immediate release and strictures being passed against the West Bengal government.

== Professional life ==
An Advocate by profession, Madhukeshwar works with the Government of Maharashtra on the International Financial Services Centre coming up at the BKC, and established the Mumbai Centre for International Arbitration, where he currently serves as its CEO. The MCIA is the product of a joint effort between the international and domestic arbitration community and the business community.

Madhukeshwar was elected vice president of the Maharasthra Basketball Association in March, 2019.

Desai serves as a director on the Dravid-Padukone Centre for Sports Excellence in Bangalore, the largest private sports facility in the country.
