= In the Shadow of a Legend: Dilip Kumar =

2022 book

- Author: Faisal Farooqui
- Language: English
- Genre: biographical book and memoir
- Publisher: Om Books International
- Publication date: 7 July 2022
- Publication place: India
- Media type: Hardcover
- Pages: 208
- ISBN: 978-9392834660

In the Shadow of a Legend: Dilip Kumar is a biographical book and memoir about the life of actor, filmmaker, and politician Dilip Kumar. The book is written by Faisal Farooqui, his longtime family friend, and published by Om Books International. The book focuses on the life of the late Kumar offscreen, chronicling little-known anecdotes from his private life.

== Synopsis ==
The book revolves around the personal life of Dilip Kumar, born as Mohammad Yusuf Khan. It traces Kumar's personality from Farooqui’s interaction with him over decades-long family friendship. Farooqui presents Kumar as someone who never let his identity of Yusuf Khan become bigger than his identity as Dilip Kumar. It includes character sketches of Kumar as a shy and hardworking young man, who respected all religions, and suffered from the trauma of early childhood following socio-political events of the 1930s and 1940s, to the time when he acted in his first scene on camera.

== Development and release ==
The book was written by Farooqui over many years but was released on the first death anniversary of the actor on July 7, 2022, by Om Books International. The book was developed more as a personal account of Kumar, than chronicling his life on screen.

== Critical reception ==
Vijay Lokapally, reviewing the book in the Business Line, notes that "In the book, Dilip Kumar: In the Shadow of a Legend, the author paints an intimate portrait of the actor, throwing light on some little-known anecdotes from his illustrious life. The book brings to us the real Dilip Kumar, away from the large screen that made him such an endearing figure for his fans." Times of India called it "an intimate portrait of the man behind the legend, a star who captivated audiences with his performances for over seventy years." Meher Bhatia from Indian Express says that "the book uncovers the real Dilip Kumar with his passion and vulnerabilities."
