= Kunal Kamra =

Indian stand-up comedian (born 1988)

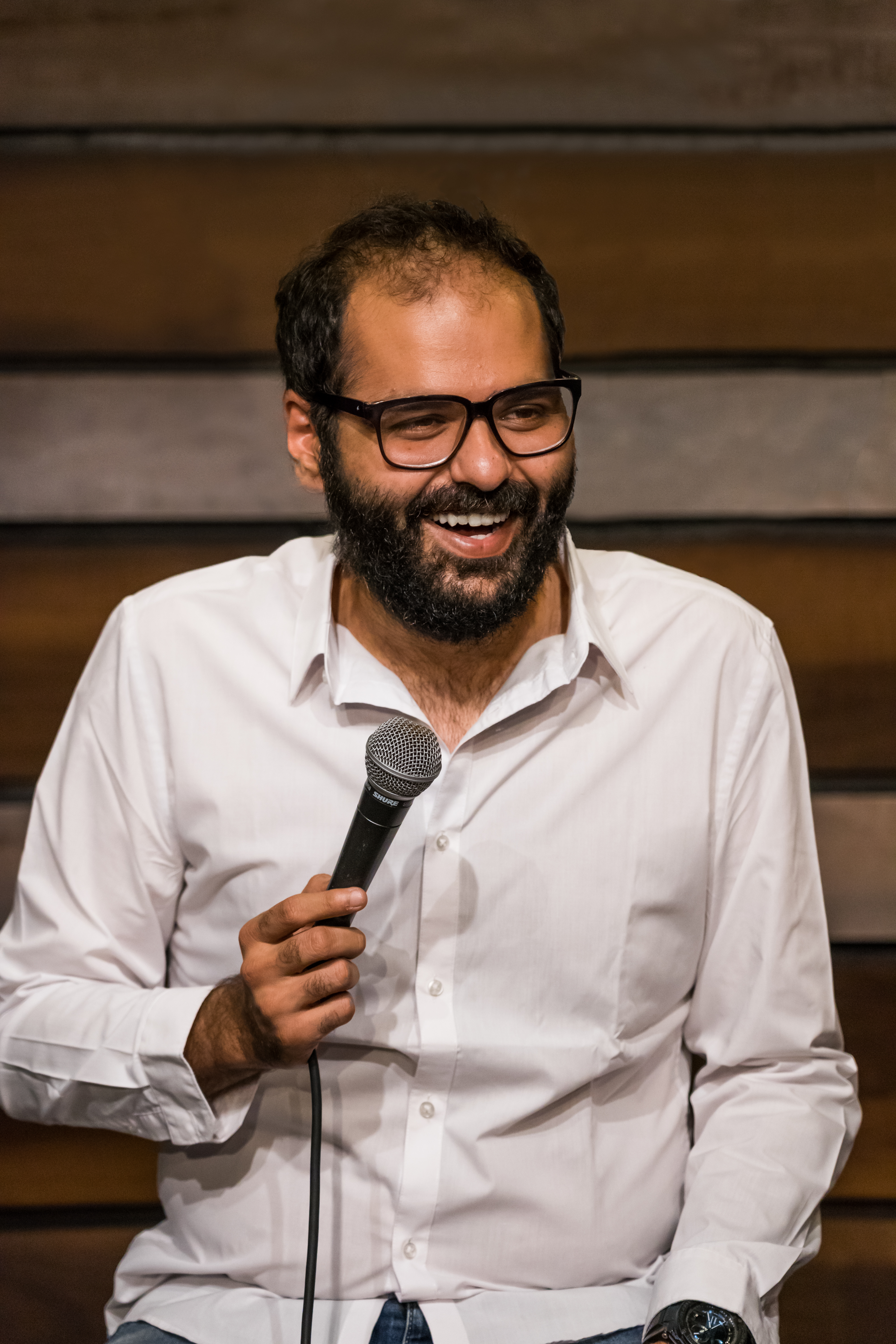
- Kamra in 2018
- Born: 3 October 1988 (age 38); Mahim, Mumbai, India
- Notable work: Shut up Ya Kunal, Why Are We Even, Team Baan
- Height: 5 ft 7 in (1.70 m)

YouTube information
- Channel: Kunal Kamra
- Years active: 2006–present
- Genres: Comedy; Stand-up comedy; Political satire; Podcast; Interview
- Subscribers: 3.44 million
- Views: 385 million
- Last updated: 24 May 2026

Kunal Kamra (born 3 October 1988) is an Indian standup comedian and political satirist which has repeatedly drawn legal action and public backlash. His performances are known to have elements of observational comedy.

== Early life and education ==
Kamra was born and brought up in Mumbai. He's of Sindhi background. He attended Jai Hind College for a degree in Commerce. He dropped out in his second year to start working as a production assistant in Prasoon Pandey's ad film production house Corcoise Films, where he worked for eleven years.

== Career ==
He started performing as a stand-up comedian in 2013, with a show at the Canvas Laugh Club in Mumbai. A clip of one of his shows, uploaded on YouTube in 2017, led to him receiving death threats for his satirical take on Indian hyper-nationalism. He started his eponymous titled talk-show Shut Up Ya Kunal in July 2017 along with Ramit Verma. The episodes typically feature a conversation with one or more invited guests, interposed with clips of news segments or debates, edited for humour. His performances include jokes about cabbies, bachelor life and ridiculous TV advertisements.

On 1 March 2017, he released a comedy video titled "Patriotism and the Government" on YouTube mocking the Indian banknote demonetization, the government and the attitude of Indians towards the army. He received several death threats for uploading the video. In 2018, he shared that he was asked by his landlady to vacate the premise due to "political issues".

=== Shut Up Ya Kunal ===
In 2017, Kunal launched a YouTube podcast titled Shut Up Ya Kunal along with his friend Ramit Verma. The show features Kamra engaged in an informal discussion with politicians and activists from both ends of the spectrum. The videos are interspersed with news clips of the guests contradicting their own statements to comic effect. Ramit Verma of the satirical Facebook page PeeingHuman is the show's creative director and editor. The first episode aired on 20 July 2017 and featured Madhukeshwar Desai, the vice-president of the Bharatiya Janata Party's youth wing.

== Controversies ==
=== Morphed video of child singing for Prime Minister Modi ===
In May 2022, Kamra shared an edited video of a seven-year-old boy singing before Prime Minister Narendra Modi during the latter's visit to Germany. In the edited version, Kamra replaced the original patriotic song with "Mehengayi Daayan", a song from the film Peepli Live, in an apparent criticism of rising inflation. The child's father publicly objected to the edited video and accused Kamra of involving his son in politics. Kamra responded that the joke was not directed at the child and that the original video was already in the public domain. Following the controversy, Kamra deleted the video.

The National Commission for Protection of Child Rights (NCPCR) sought action against Kamra, stating that the edited video used a minor for political purposes, and requested Twitter to remove the post. The commission later summoned a Twitter India official after stating that no action-taken report had been submitted regarding its request.

=== Incident on IndiGo flight ===
On 28 January 2020, Kamra, while travelling on an IndiGo flight, confronted the news presenter Arnab Goswami, inviting him to debate with him. Kamra had raised questions about Goswami's coverage of issues on national affairs and the suicide of Rohith Vemula. Kamra later released a 1.51-minute long video of the incident on Twitter, which showed a non-responsive Goswami while being questioned by him. The next day, Indigo banned Kamra from boarding its flights for a period of six months. The same day, government-owned airline Air India banned him indefinitely. India's aviation minister, Hardeep Singh Puri, tweeted that other airlines should follow suit and ban Kamra to ensure that an example was set. The next day, SpiceJet and GoAir also banned him indefinitely. The ban was criticized for being excessive and against the rules of the Directorate General of Civil Aviation.

Filmmaker Anurag Kashyap refused to fly with IndiGo due to their decision to ban Kamra. Two IndiGo passengers also protested and displayed placards on a plane in support of Kamra.

Kamra issued a legal notice to IndiGo against the travel ban demanding a compensation of ₹25 lakh (US$27,000).

On 11 September 2022, after his comedy shows were cancelled in Gurgaon, Kamra wrote an open letter addressed to the Vishva Hindu Parishad (VHP). He challenged VHP to condemn Mahatma Gandhi's assassin Nathuram Godse.

=== Accusations of contempt of court ===
After Republic TV editor-in-chief Arnab Goswami was granted interim bail by the Supreme Court on 11 November 2020, Kamra made a series of tweets critical of the Supreme Court. Eight people accused Kamra of contempt of court and sued him. The Attorney General K. K. Venugopal gave his mandatory approval to initiate contempt proceedings related to the tweets. Kamra said he continued to believe that "the silence of the Supreme Court of India on matters of other's personal liberty cannot go uncriticised." He further stated that he does not intend to retract the tweets nor apologise for them. He asked that the time that may be allotted for hearing his contempt case should be spent on more important cases pending before the court.

=== Accusation of defamation ===
In a show recorded in January 2025 and made available on YouTube in March 2025, Kamra, without directly naming the Maharashtra Deputy Chief Minister Eknath Shinde during his performance, made remarks that were not well received by Shinde's supporters. This triggered a controversy hours after the video was posted on YouTube. Workers from the Shinde-led Sena vandalized the Habitat comedy club where the show featuring the jibe at Shinde was filmed. Twelve of the vandals were eventually arrested and granted bail on the same day. A first information report (FIR) was also filed against Kamra by Shinde-led Shiv Sena MLA Murji Patel for allegedly making defamatory remarks about Eknath Shinde. Kamra faces charges under multiple sections of the Bharatiya Nyaya Sanhita, including Sections 353(1)(b) and 353(2) (statements conducive to public mischief), and 356(2) (defamation). After filing the FIR, Murji Patel also issued Kamra a two-day ultimatum demanding an apology. Patel warned that failure to comply would result in escalated action against the comedian. Kamra refused to apologise and was eventually summoned by the Greater Mumbai Police for questioning.

On 28 March 2025, he was granted interim anticipatory bail by the Madras High Court.

On 29 March 2025, The Indian Express reported that three more FIRs had been lodged against Kamra.

In early 2026, proceedings in connection with the controversy remained ongoing. In March 2026, Kamra was scheduled to appear before the Maharashtra Legislative Council's Privilege Committee regarding complaints related to his remarks.

Separately, Kamra filed a petition before the Bombay High Court challenging the implementation of the “Sahyog” portal and certain amendments to the Information Technology Rules, contending that they could affect freedom of expression.

=== CJP protests ===
In July 2026, Kamra joined the Cockroach Janta Party (CJP)-led protest at Delhi's Jantar Mantar, held over alleged irregularities in the NEET-UG examination. Addressing the gathering on 15 July, Kamra said "Sita ke pati ka naam lekar, Nita ke pati ka kaam kar rahi hai." Days later advocate Amita Sachdeva sent Kamra a legal notice alleging the comment hurt Hindu religious sentiments, demanding he delete the video, apologize and give a written undertaking within 48 hours.

== Filmography ==
=== List of Shut Up Ya Kunal Episodes ===
No.	Guests
1	Madhukeshwar Desai, (Vice-president of the BJP Youth Wing)
2	Priyanka Chaturvedi, (ex National Spokesperson, Congress)
3	Kanhaiya Kumar and Umar Khalid (JNU students)
4	Karuna Nundy (Supreme Court Lawyer) and Siddharth Varadarajan (Co-founder, The Wire)
5	Shehla Rashid (ex Vice President, JNU) and Jignesh Mevani (MLA Vadgam, Gujarat)
6	Ravish Kumar, (NDTV Journalist)
7	Kavita Krishnan, Politburo Member, CPI-ML and Secretary, All India Progressive Women's Association (AIPWA)
8	Ravish Kumar (NDTV Journalist) [Part 2]
9	Asaduddin Owaisi, MP and President, All India Majlis-e-Ittehadul Muslimeen (AIMIM)
10	Atishi (Aam Aadmi Party) and Shweta Shalini (Bharatiya Janata Party)
11	Javed Akhtar (poet, lyricist, and screenwriter) and Yogendra Yadav (politician, psephologist, and President of Swaraj India)
12	Milind Deora (ex MP and President of Congress Mumbai) and Sachin Pilot (Deputy Chief Minister of Rajasthan)
13	Arvind Kejriwal (CM, Delhi, Aam Aadmi Party)
14	Javed Akhtar (poet, lyricist, and screenwriter) and Yogendra Yadav (politician, psephologist, and President of Swaraj India) (Part 2)
15	Anubhav Sinha (Director) and Anand Gandhi
16	Manish Sisodia (Deputy CM, Delhi) and Sanjay Singh (Rajyasabha MP) (Aam Aadmi Party)
17	Tejasvi Surya (MP, Bangalore South, Bharatiya Janata Party)
18	Sanjay Raut (MP, Rajya Sabha, Maharashtra, Shiv Sena)
19	Nishith Desai (Lawyer) and Suril Desai (Analyst), Nishith Desai Associates
20	Acharya Prashant (Philosopher, Author, Advaita teacher, and Social activist)

Nope with Kunal Kamra
No.	Episode Name & Guest
1	Are We Indians Scientific? Nope with Kunal Kamra ft Gauhar Raza

=== Other works ===
Name	Year	Genre	Platform	Notes
Canvas Laugh Club	2013	Comedy	YouTube	Live stand-up shows.
One Mic Stand	2019	Comedy	Amazon Prime Video	Mentor to Shashi Tharoor
Why Are We Even	2020	Art Podcast	YouTube	Philosophical conversations and creative videos on existential issues. Five episodes till October 2020, on/with Rajneesh, Aamir Aziz, Irrfan Khan, Kanhaiya Kumar, Acharya Prashant, and Anand Gandhi.
Team Baan: Monday Morning Podcast	2020	Podcast	YouTube	Weekly political discussions with (the owner of Twitter parody account named) 'ROFL Gandhi'.
Nope	2025	Podcast	YouTube	Weekly discussions uncovering deeper reality about ongoing developments in India.

== See also ==
- Samay Raina
- Ambikesh Mahapatra
- Kunal Kamra v. Union of India
