= Keenan-Reuben murder case =

2011 crime in Mumbai, India

The Keenan-Reuben murder case relates to the murder of Keenan Santos (Keenan) (Note: News reports consistently use first names for Keenan Santos and Reuben Fernandes/Fernandez so this article does the same) aged 24 and Reuben Fernandez (Reuben) aged 29 in Mumbai, India on 20 October 2011. The pair were murdered in Mumbai by a group of about 17 men while the passing crowd of over 50 persons looked passively on. The group was associated with a pair of men who had been rebuffed by Keenan and Reuben for molesting girls in their party.

== Incident ==
On 11 October 2011 Keenan and Reuben were part of a party of 4 men and 3 women who were on a night out in the western suburbs of Mumbai. The girls were harassed and molested by a small group of men. The girls rebuffed the advances and the men were reprimanded by Keenan and Reuben and initially left the scene. They gathered a group of 21 men equipped with knives, poles and bamboo sticks. Catching up with Keenan and Reuben they assaulted the pair with Keenan being stabbed first and dying shortly thereafter and Reuben dying some days later.

== Trial ==
The murder case was shifted to a Special Women's Court and eventually the four perpetrators were sentenced to life imprisonment.

== Aftermath ==
Avinash Bali, a police informer and the key witness in the trial, was himself murdered on 20 August 2018.
