= 2021 Indian social media regulations =

Regulatons on social media in India

In February 2021, the Indian Ministry of Electronics and Information Technology announced new guidelines for social media companies, which required, among other things, the appointment of a chief compliance officer and the removal of content within 36 hours when requested by authorities, to take effect in May.

Several companies, such as Twitter, Instagram and WhatsApp, failed to confirm that they would comply and requested a 6-month delay to the enforcement of the law. Koo, an India-based alternative to Twitter, announced it had complied with the law, while Facebook announced its intent to comply. On May 26, WhatsApp took the Indian government to court, stating that they believed the new laws were "unconstitutuional".
