= Indian Kanoon =

Search engine for Indian law

- Website: indiankanoon.org
- Launched: 2008; 18 years ago
- Current status: Online

Indian Kanoon is an Indian law search engine. It was launched on 4 January 2008. The search engine has been meshed with the highest courts and tribunals of India to provide up-to-date judgements.
