= MoreSunlight =

Proposal to advance Indian Standard Time

MoreSunlight or Project Moresunlight is a proposal to advance Indian Standard Time by 30 minutes. According to the proposal of MoreSunlight, the current time of India, which is +530 UTC should be advance to +600 UTC. The project is a conception of many government officers, elected representatives, members of the scientific community in India and civil society organizations and ordinary citizens.

== Background ==
India's current time is calculated from 82.5 longitude. This has been the established convention since 1906. Due to the geographical breadth of the country which spans 29 degrees of longitude there is a difference of 1 hour and 56 minutes between the extreme western and eastern parts of the country. Conveners of Project Moresunglight argues for calculating India's time zone from 90 degree east longitude

Moreover, citizens in the north and north eastern parts of India tend to get less usable sunlight during their routine awake timings. There have been demands to split the country into two time zones. Some proposals have also called for daylight saving time concept as is prevalent in parts of Europe and America. The Government of India, has rejected both these demands.

== Solution to India's time situation ==
Scientists and concerned citizens, at various forums have concluded that the best way to bring an optimum utilization of India's abundant sunlight is by advancing India's time by 30 minutes. Project Moresunlight proposes to educate the decision makers in India about the benefits of such an advancement, where India's new time zone would be +6:00 GMT.

== Benefits ==
It is estimated that electricity worth more than 4000 crores a year will be saved by advancing IST by 30mins.

== See also ==
- Bombay Time
- Calcutta Time
