= MouthShut.com =

Indian review website

- Website type: Review and ratings
- Headquarters: Mumbai, India
- Founder: Faisal Farooqui
- Website: https://www.mouthshut.com/
- Commercial: Yes
- Registration: Required for posting
- Launched: 2000
- Current status: Active

Mouthshut.com is a consumer review and rating platform founded in 2000 by Faisal Farooqui. The platform hosts user-written reviews and ratings for over 800,000 products and services available in India. The platform covers over 400 categories. The company has been involved in legal challenges regarding internet intermediary rules, notably petitioning the Supreme Court against provisions of the Information Technology Rules, 2021, which led to the repeal of Section 66A and the reading down of intermediary guidelines.

== History ==
Faisal Farooqui conceived the idea of a review website in 1998 while attending the State University of New York at Binghamton. He recognized the significance of customer feedback for business growth during a class.

He returned to India and launched MouthShut.com in late 2000. The platform was initially marketed via a curated email list of 1800 individuals, including contacts of the company's initial employees, staff, friends, and relatives.

Later, Farooqui used the rear space of auto rickshaws as a medium to promote the website. In 2001, the team implemented a 'Dial-the-CEO' option, allowing users to provide direct feedback.

Video reviews for products and services were enabled on the platform in December 2006.

In May 2007, Farooqui expanded the video review concept into a dedicated video review platform, Dekhona.com.

In December 2008, the platform introduced mobile reviews that could be posted via an SMS shortcode.

In July 2012, the website transitioned from a reviews-only platform to one providing buying guides.

== Products ==
In May 2011, MouthShut.com launched Dealface.com, a website offering sales deals across industry segments. This was later integrated into Mouthshut.com.

In May 2014, the company launched its mobile application for Android and iOS.

== Awards and recognition ==
In 2006, MouthShut received the Manthan Award for Best Youth Website from the Govt. of India.

MouthShut.com received the Best Portal of the Year - Gold award at the first India Digital Media Awards.

MouthShut CEO Faisal Farooqui has been credited with introducing Web 2.0 concepts in India.

Faisal is mentioned as one of the first Indian dotcom founders of the 21st century.

== Mouthshut.com and freedom of speech ==
To protect its review writers from threats by brands, MouthShut stated in its filings with the Supreme Court of India that it would not reveal the identity of any review writers unless ordered by a court of competent jurisdiction. On April 29, 2013, MouthShut.com filed a petition in the Supreme Court of India challenging India's Information Technology Rules 2011. MouthShut.com argued that this law would effectively delegate essential executive functions, such as censoring and restricting citizens' free speech, to private parties like MouthShut.com, leaving them vulnerable to legal challenges over user content. The verdict was in favor of MouthShut.com, leading to the repeal of Section 66A and the reading down of IT Rules and intermediary guidelines.

== Controversies ==
In February 2014, MouthShut was blocked by Bangalore-based ISP ACT Internet company and its Hyderabad-based subsidiary Beam Fiber, without a stated reason. The company escalated the issue with the Telecom Regulatory Authority of India (TRAI) and the Department of Telecommunications (DoT). Later, the website was unblocked by the two ISPs.

In December 2017, the company blocked 80,000 fake user profiles to prevent potential spamming and fake reviews.

In March 2018, MouthShut.com deleted 4,100 user profiles that were posting fake reviews.
