= Broadcasting Services (Regulation) Bill, 2023 =

Proposed law in India

Parliament of India
- Long title: A Bill to overhaul the regulatory framework for broadcasting services and to replace the Cable Television Networks (Regulation) Act of 1995 and encompass a wider range of platforms and technologies.
- Territorial extent: Flag of India
- Enacted by: Not yet enacted
- Introduced by: Anurag Thakur

Repeals
- Cable Television Networks (Regulation) Act of 1995
- Status: Pending

The Broadcasting Services (Regulation) Bill, 2023 is a proposed law that aims to overhaul the regulatory framework for broadcasting services in India. A draft of the bill was introduced in 2023 and was published for public consultation. A second draft was created in 2024, and shared only with key stakeholders. It was subsequently revoked and the 2023 draft has been revived,

The bill would replace the Cable Television Networks (Regulation) Act of 1995 and encompass a wider range of platforms and technologies. The 2023 draft, published in November 2023, included a programme code for OTT platforms (streaming platforms). The revoked 2024 draft would have brought online content creators under the ambit of the law by introducing a new category called "digital news broadcasters".

== Proposal ==
The bill proposes establishing a new regulatory body called the Broadcasting Authority of India (BAI) to oversee the implementation of the bill and regulations. Other proposed changes include:

- Data localization: Requirement for certain platforms to store data in India.
- Self-regulation: A two-tier system of self-regulation with an option for government intervention in case of non-compliance.
- Content evaluation Committee: A committee to evaluate content and certify its compliance with the code.
- Transparency and grievance redressal: Measures to ensure transparency in decision-making and provide viewers with effective grievance redressal mechanisms.

The stated objectives of the bill are:

- Consolidation: To bring all forms of broadcasting under a single, streamlined regulatory framework.
- Content regulation: To address issues like hate speech, fake news, and violence through content codes and age verification mechanisms.
- Promoting local content: To increase the presence of Indian programming across all platforms.
- Viewer protection: To safeguard viewers' interests by ensuring program quality, transparency, and grievance redressal mechanisms.
- Balancing freedom and accountability: To uphold freedom of expression while holding platforms accountable for harmful content.

As of December 2023, the draft bill is open for public consultation.

== Reactions ==
The broad scope of the bill, encompassing even individual content creators, raises concerns about government overreach and potential censorship. Critics argue that vague content codes and subjective interpretations could stifle creative expression and limit the diversity of voices.

The two-tier self-regulation system, with government intervention as a backup, might not provide adequate safeguards against arbitrary decisions and suppression of dissent.

The emphasis on promoting "Indian content" and regulating harmful content could lead to unintended consequences for freedom of expression. Critics argue that defining "Indian" and "harmful" subjectively could be used to suppress critical voices and diverse perspectives.

The bill's provisions for data localization and government access to user data raise concerns about privacy violations and potential misuse of information.

== See also ==
- Information Technology Act, 2000
