= M Sathyanarayanan =

Former Judge of Madras High Court

Hon'ble Justice (Retd.) M Sathyanarayanan

Judge of Madras High Court
- In office 23 April 2008 – 9 June 2021
- Nominated by: K. G. Balakrishnan
- Appointed by: Pratibha Patil

Personal details
- Born: 10 June 1959 (age 67)
- Education: Dr. Ambedkar Government Law College, Chennai

Justice M Sathyanarayanan (born 10 June 1949) is a former judge of the Madras High Court. He was the third judge chosen to deliver the verdict in the Tamil Nadu MLA disqualification case.

== Education ==
He studied B.Com at the DG Vaishnav College, in Madras, (now Chennai) after which, he studied law at the Madraw Law College.

== Career in law ==
Sathyanarayanan was enrolled as an advocate on 6 April 1983. He was a junior advocate under M N Padmanaban and K S Dinakaran. He practiced on the civil as well as criminal side before the Madras High Court and lower courts. He also undertook service and tax matters, appearing for clients like All India Service Officers and Punjab National Bank. He also worked as the standing counsel for Punjab National Bank.

== Judgeship ==
He was appointed an additional judge of the Madras High Court on 23 April 2008 and as permanent judge on 9 November 2009.
