= Atria Convergence Technologies =

Indian telecommunications company

Atria Convergence Technologies Limited
- Type: Private
- Industry: Telecommunications
- Founded: 2000; 26 years ago
- Founder: Sunder Raju
- Headquarters: Indian Express Building, No.1, 2nd Floor, Queen's Road, Bengaluru, Karnataka, India
- Areas served: Major metro cities and some towns.
- Key people: Sunder Raju (MD); Bala Malladi (CEO)
- Services: FTTH; Internet service provider; Digital television; Leased line
- Revenue: ₹2,000 crore (US$210 million) (2017–18)
- Owners: India Value Fund Advisors; TA Associates
- Number of employees: 7,100 (2018)
- Website: actcorp.in

Atria Convergence Technologies Limited, branded as ACT, is an Indian telecommunications company headquartered in Bengaluru, Karnataka, India. ACT offers fibre to the home (FTTH) services under the brand name "ACT Fibernet" and digital television services under the "ACT Digital" brand. The company provides services in Tamil Nadu, Telangana, Andhra Pradesh, Karnataka, Delhi, Gujarat, Rajasthan and Uttar Pradesh.

ACT was the fifth largest internet service provider in India as of May 2026. As on 31 March 2022, ACT was the fourth largest wired broadband service provider in India with over 20 lakh (2 million) subscribers.

== History ==
Atria Convergence Technologies Limited was founded in 2000 by Sunder Raju in Bengaluru. Private equity firm India Value Fund Advisors (IVFA) acquired a majority stake in the company in 2008.

In 2009, the company acquired Beam Telecom Pvt. Ltd for an undisclosed sum. Beam Telecom was founded by Brijesh Chandwani in 2004, and offered broadband services in Hyderabad under the brand name Beam Fiber. ACT acquired an additional 20% stake in Beam Telecom in June 2014, raising its total stake in the company to 80%. In July 2014, ACT rebranded its broadband service from ACT Broadband to ACT Fibernet.

ACT continued to operate services in Hyderabad under the Beam Fiber name until 2015. On 16 February 2015, ACT announced that it was merging Beam Telecom Pvt. Ltd into itself, and would offer wire-line optical fibre broadband services in Hyderabad under the ACT Fibernet name. On the same day, ACT announced the launch of 100 Mbit/s plans.

== Expansion plans ==
On 22 July 2016, ACT made its presence in the capital city of Delhi, with the launch of four plans and highest speed of 100 Mbit/s.

On 30 March 2017, ACT launched 1 Gbit/s wired broadband plans in Hyderabad, becoming the first ISP in India to offer practically gigabit speeds. It also announced plans to introduce the gigabit speed to other cities. By July, the company was in talks with other ISP providers to increase its presence in the country, while also installing 1,000 WiFi hotspots in Hyderabad as part of the 'City WiFi Project'.

ACT Fibernet expanded its presence by launching services in Madurai in September 2018 and Warangal in October 2018.

In 2019, ACT expanded its services to Jaipur, Lucknow and Ahmedabad.
