= Shriya =

Shriya is a feminine given name in the languages of India. Other spellings include: Shreeya, Shreeyya

Shriya connotes the Hindu Goddess Lakshmi, and has multiple meanings, including:

- Prosperity: An Indian name for girls and boys that means "prosperity"
- Auspicious: A meaning of the name Shriya
- Wealth: A meaning of the Sanskrit word Śriyā in Jyotisha
- Wisdom queen: A meaning of the Sanskrit word Śriyā in Tibetan Buddhism
- Sovereign glory: A meaning of the Sanskrit word Śriyā in Shaktism
- Happiness: A meaning of the Sanskrit word Śriyā that refers to welfare and bliss
- The Sanskrit words Śriyā and Śriya can be transliterated into English as Sriya or Shriya.

== Notable people named Shriya ==
- Shriya Pilgaonkar
- Shriya Saran, Indian actress and model
- Shriya Sharma, Indian film actress and model
- Shriya Shah-Klorfine
- Shriya Kishore
- Shriya Jha
