= Shreya Singhal v. Union of India =

Online Free Speech & IT Act, 2000

- Court: Supreme Court of India
- Full case name: Shreya Singhal and Ors. v. Union of India
- Decided: 24 March 2015
- Citation: AIR 2015 SC 1523; Writ Petition (Criminal) No. 167 OF 2012

Court membership
- Judges sitting: R.F. Nariman, J. Chelameshwar

Case opinions
- Decision by: R.F. Nariman

Shreya Singhal v. Union of India is a judgement by a two-judge bench of the Supreme Court of India in 2015, on the issue of online speech and intermediary liability in India. The Supreme Court struck down Section 66A of the Information Technology Act, 2000, relating to restrictions on online speech, as unconstitutional on grounds of violating the freedom of speech guaranteed under Article 19(1)(a) of the Constitution of India. The Court further held that the Section was not saved by virtue of being a 'reasonable restriction' on the freedom of speech under Article 19(2). The Supreme Court also read down Section 79 and Rules under the Section. It held that online intermediaries would only be obligated to take down content on receiving an order from a court or government authority. The case is considered a watershed moment for online free speech in India.

== Background ==
=== History of Section 66A ===
Section 66A of the Information Technology Act, 2000 made it a punishable offence for any person to send 'grossly offensive' or 'menacing' information using a computer resource or communication device. The provision also made it punishable to persistently send information which the sender knows to be false for annoyance, inconvenience, danger, obstruction, insult, injury, criminal intimidation, enmity, hatred or ill will. Additionally, Section 66A made it punishable to send an 'electronic mail message' for the purpose of causing annoyance, or inconvenience, or to deceive or to mislead the recipient about the origin of the message.

The vague and arbitrary terms used in the Section led to much misuse of both personal and political nature, with several criminal cases being instituted against innocuous instances of online speech, including political commentary and humour. Section 66A and 79 of the IT Act, as well as rules made under the Act created an onerous liability regime for internet intermediaries.

=== History of the case ===
The provisions were challenged in the Supreme Court, in a series of writ petitions by individuals (Shreya Singhal), NGOs (People's Union for Civil Liberties, Common Cause), and companies(Mouthshut.com). The various petitions were clubbed together and heard by a two-judge bench of Justices Chelameswar and Nariman.

== Judgement ==
In a 52-page judgement, the Supreme Court struck down Section 66-A of the Information Technology Act, read down Section 79 of the Information Technology Act and the related rules, and affirmed the constitutionality of Section 69A of the Act.

Speaking for the Court, Justice Nariman discussed the various standards which are applicable to adjudge when restrictions on speech can be deemed reasonable, under Article 19(2) of the Indian Constitution. The Court held that Section 66-A was vague and over-broad, and therefore fell foul of Article 19(1)(a), since the statute was not narrowly tailored to specific instances of speech which it sought to curb. Importantly, the Court also considered the 'chilling effect' on speech caused by vague and over-broad statutory language as a rationale for striking down the provision. Further, the Court held that the 'public order' restriction under Article 19(2) of the Constitution would not apply to cases of 'advocacy', but only to 'incitement', specifically incitement which has a proximate relation to public disorder.

On the equal protection challenge Article 14 of the Constitution of India, the Court also held that "we are unable to agree with counsel for the petitioners that there is no intelligible differentia between the medium of print, broadcast and real live speech as opposed to speech on the internet. The intelligible differentia is clear – the internet gives any individual a platform which requires very little or no payment through which to air his views."

The Supreme Court further read down Section 79 and Rule 3(4) of the Intermediaries Guidelines, under the Act, which deals with the liability of intermediaries, mostly those which host content and provide online services. Whereas the Section itself uses the term 'receiving actual knowledge', of the illegal material as the standard at which the intermediary is liable for removing content, the Court held that it must be read to mean knowledge received that a Court order has been passed asking it to take down the infringing material.

Finally, the Court also upheld the secret blocking process under Section 69A of the Act, by which the Government can choose to take down content from the Internet, holding that it did not suffer from the infirmities in Section 66A or Section 79, and is a narrowly drawn provision with adequate safeguards.

== Significance ==
While the decision of the Supreme Court is of immense significance in protecting online free speech against arbitrary restrictions, Section 66A, which was declared unconstitutional, has continued to be used as a punitive measure against online speech in several cases.

The reading down of Section 79 of the IT act by the Supreme Court, to include the requirement that a takedown notice must be sanctioned by a court or government authority, has also been interpreted by the Delhi High Court in the case of MySpace v. Super Cassettes, to not apply to cases of copyright infringement under the Indian Copyright Act.

== See also ==
- Ambikesh Mahapatra
- Nupur Sharma
