= Nikhil Pahwa =

Indian journalist and digital rights activist

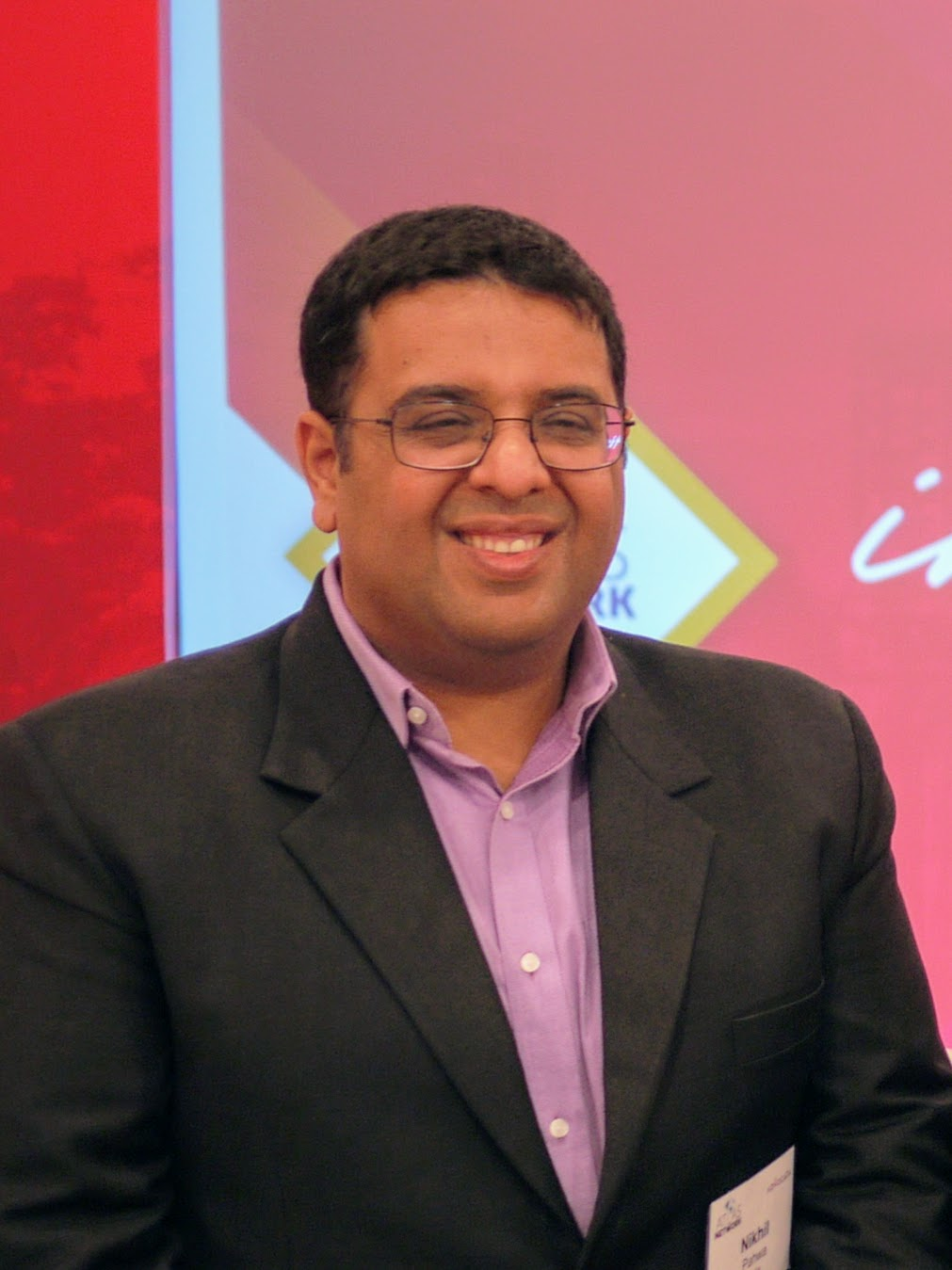
- Nikhil Pahwa at Asia Liberty Forum 2019 in Colombo, Sri Lanka.
- Born: 23 February 1981 (age 45)
- Citizenship: Indian
- Occupations: Journalist and Activist

Nikhil Pahwa (born 23 February 1981) is an Indian journalist, digital rights activist, and founder of MediaNama, a mobile and digital news portal. He has been a key commentator on stories and debates around Indian digital media companies, censorship and Internet and mobile regulation in India.

He is the founder of 'Save the Internet' that was instrumental in successfully opposing Facebook's Free Basics programme in India on the basis that it limited competition and violated net neutrality. Pahwa, along with some volunteers of 'Save the Internet' co-founded the Internet Freedom Foundation in 2016 and resigned in 2018. Pahwa was earlier the editor of ContentSutra, which was acquired by the Guardian Media Group. He was named one of India Today Magazine's "Indians of Tomorrow" in 2012, a TED fellow in 2016, and an Asia21 Young Leader in 2019.

== MediaNama ==
After working at ContentSutra for two years, Nikhil Pahwa founded MediaNama on 27 June 2008. The portal provides news and analysis of the digital and telecom businesses of India. It also monitors the digital policies set by the government of India.

== Activism ==
When the Indian government invited comments on net neutrality in 2014, Nikhil Pahwa was a notable activist in the debate which helped the government reach a decision in favour of net neutrality. Later that year, when Facebook announced its plans of launching a service to provide free Internet access to selected sites and apps on the Internet, Pahwa was one of its most vocal critics and, being a "respected voice in the field", he was invited for a discussion with Facebook executives. In 2015, after Facebook nevertheless launched its Free Basics programme in partnership with Reliance Mobile, a major telecom company, the Telecom Regulatory Authority of India (TRAI) invited public comments on a ruling on net neutrality. Pahwa believed this to be a worrying development as TRAI's judgements tended to come down on the side of the phone companies. He believed that only a grassroots campaign would save net neutrality and contacted coders, lawyers, and policy wonks to form a movement dubbed, Save the Internet. A website, savetheinternet.in, was launched on 11 April which allowed visitors to easily make submissions to TRAI with their answers to the 20 questions posed by TRAI on net neutrality. The movement took off when a video by the comedy group, All India Bakchod, explaining net neutrality to the viewer directed the public to make their submissions via savetheinternet.in. By 24 April, 1.1 million Indians had e-mailed the regulator not to license or sanction plans such as Free Basics that violated net neutrality.

== See also ==
- Net neutrality in India
