= Internet Freedom Foundation =

Indian digital liberties organisation

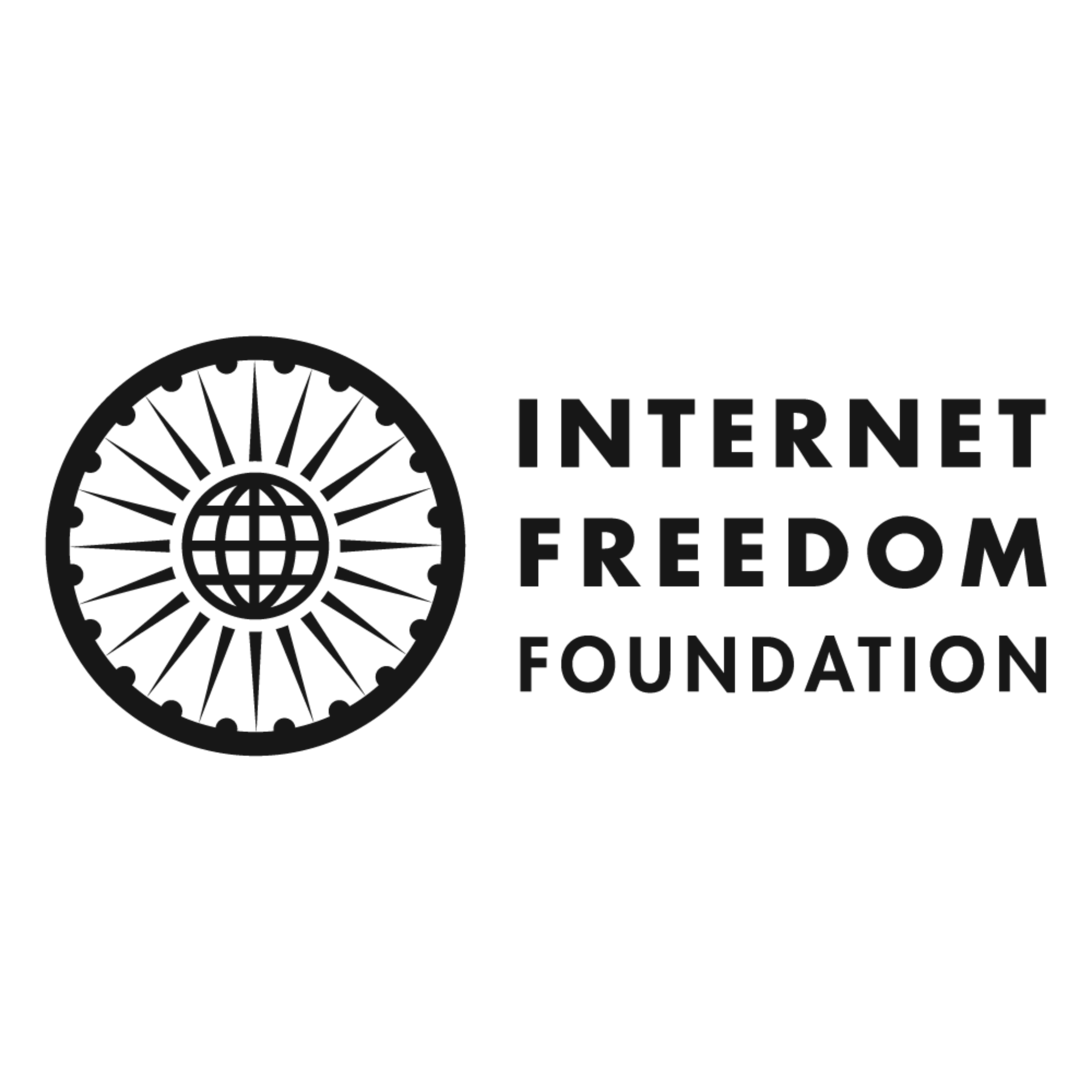
- Abbreviation: IFF
- Predecessor: SaveTheInternet.in
- Formation: 15 August 2016; 10 years ago
- Founder: Apar Gupta, Aravind Sulekha, Karthik Balakrishnan, Rachita Taneja, Raman Chima, Rohin Dharmakumar, Kiran Jonnalagadda, Nikhil Pahwa
- Type: Nonprofit
- Purpose: Digital rights
- Headquarters: New Delhi, India
- Region served: India
- Founder Director: Apar Gupta
- Website: internetfreedom.in

Internet Freedom Foundation (IFF) is an Indian digital rights advocacy organisation that defends against threats to civil liberties and democracy in India. Launched on 15 August 2016 — India's Independence Day, — it grounds its mission in the principles of the Constitution of India, reflecting its commitment to democratic rights and civic participation. IFF combines digital-first campaigning with policy advocacy. Its staff and volunteers run literacy projects such as online campaigns that inform citizens and engage government bodies about complex issues in technology policy. It conducts strategic litigation in matters of censorship, digital surveillance, and digital privacy. Based in New Delhi, it is led by Indian lawyer and founder director Apar Gupta.

== History ==
Internet Freedom Foundation emerged from the SaveTheInternet.in, a volunteer-driven advocacy campaign for Net neutrality in India. The SaveTheInternet.in campaign gathered over 1.2 million signatures from Indian citizens opposing discriminatory pricing practices by telecom companies. In response to this mobilization and other stakeholder input, the Telecom Regulatory Authority of India (TRAI) issued regulations prohibiting discriminatory data pricing, commonly known as zero-rating practices. IFF was formally launched on August 15, 2016.

Absent advocacy organisations working on digital rights in India, and to enable sustained work the co-founders of the SaveTheInternet.in campaign established IFF as an organisation to work on issues of privacy, free speech, net neutrality, and innovation on the internet. IFF became a staffed organisation in April, 2018 and Apar Gupta took over as the Executive Director. Gupta served in this capacity until July 2023. Following a transition period, Gupta returned to lead the organization as Founder Director in November 2024.

== Mission ==
IFF's mission is threefold: to challenge the concentration of power and profit in digital technology markets, to defend civil liberties in the digital sphere, and to ensure transparency and accountability in technology policy affecting Indian citizens. For this it leverages the Right to Information Act, 2005. It has also undertaken strategic litigation and offered pro-bono legal assistance to journalists, creators and media professionals in cases of surveillance such as spyware infections and internet censorship such as blocking of websites,. It has also engaged on issues on the impact of technology on democracy and the growth of digital authoritarianism in India.

== Projects ==
=== Zombie Tracker ===
Zombie Tracker is a public database developed by IFF in partnership with Civic Data Labs that documents cases still being prosecuted under Section 66A of the Information Technology Act, despite the Supreme Court striking down the provision in Shreya Singhal v. Union of India. The tool is named 'Zombie Tracker' as a metaphor for the 'zombie' nature of the legal provision—officially killed by judicial order but continuing to haunt the criminal justice system through ongoing prosecutions. The tracker along with strategic litigation lead to a closure of all 66A cases. Newslaundry reported on the order, referencing the underlying litigation. The dataset was based on an empirical study in a research paper by Apar Gupta and Abhinav Sekhri calling attention to the continued use of Section 66A of the IT Act, despite the Supreme Court striking it down.

=== Project Panoptic ===
Project Panoptic tracks the development and implementation of facial recognition technology projects in India with an aim to increase transparency and accountability around the use of Facial recognition technology in India. The tracker was built by IFF along with volunteers from Datakind and Frappe. As of November 2021, Project Panoptic tracked 78 facial recognition technology (FRT) projects across India, with the tracked projects collectively budgeted at approximately 9.6 billion Indian rupees. Project Panoptic along with Amnesty International and Article 19, launched the Hyderabad leg of BanTheScan campaign. Hyderabad is one of the most surveilled cities in the world, with 600,000 cameras monitoring its citizens all the time. By 2024, the tracker had expanded to document over 120 government FRT tenders, providing the most comprehensive public database of India's facial recognition procurement and deployment.

=== Digital Patrakar Defence Clinic ===
Digital Patrakar Defense Clinic (DPDC)—'patrakar' meaning 'journalist' in Hindi—offers pro-bono legal assistance and representation to Indian journalists, cartoonists, bloggers, and other digital content creators facing legal threats, including defamation suits, obscenity charges, or censorship orders.

== Public Campaigns ==
=== Speech Bill ===
In March 2017, IFF drafted a law to reform India's defamation law which was introduced in Lok Sabha as a Private Member's Bill by Tathagata Satpathy. The bill garnered more than 2000 signatures and 54 organisational supporters, including India's largest publishing houses. However, like most Private Member's Bills, this legislation did not advance to passage

=== Keep Us Online ===
In April 2017, IFF launched a campaign against internet shutdowns in India called KeepUsOnline. They petitioned the Prime Minister and the Union Minister for Electronics and Information Technology to introduce credible measures to stop arbitrary internet shutdowns in India.

=== Save Our Privacy ===
Launched in 2018, SaveOurPrivacy is a public initiative launched by a collective of 35 organizations including IFF, which put across a model draft law called "Indian Privacy Code, 2018". The code has seven core principles, one of which calls for surveillance reform. It advocates for a law that limits mass or 'dragnet' surveillance, and lays down clear rules governing individual surveillance. It also seeks the strengthening and protection of the right to information. After going through multiple revisions, the draft was filed as a private member's bill in the parliament, twice. The collective creates resources for public awareness and continuously engages with government representatives.

== Litigation ==
IFF has engaged in a broad array of legal actions — as petitioner, intervener, legal representative, and amicus curiae — to uphold digital rights and civil liberties in India. These span multiple themes from online privacy and data protection to free expression, surveillance reform, and internet access. It includes cases where team members from IFF have acted as litigators, the organisation has been a petitioner, provided legal representation, intervened in ongoing matters, or supported other petitioners through amicus briefs and counsel. A separate section covers legal notices issued by IFF and their impact.

=== Privacy and Data Protection ===
In 2017, IFF intervened in a Supreme Court case challenging WhatsApp’s privacy policy, which allowed greater data sharing with Facebook. IFF sought an interim stay on WhatsApp’s 2016 policy and later opposed the 2021 policy update on behalf of users, highlighting threats to data privacy. This matter is now before a Constitution Bench of the Supreme Court, underscoring the need for a robust data protection regime in India.

IFF provided legal assistance to a petitioner challenging the mandatory use of the Aarogya Setu contact-tracing app for employees during the COVID-19 pandemic. Filed in the Kerala High Court in 2020, the petition argued that forcing the app on private and public sector workers was a disproportionate invasion of privacy (violating Articles 14, 19, and 21). Soon after the court admitted the case, the government revised its guidelines to make Aarogya Setu usage voluntary (“best efforts” basis) instead of mandatory.

In 2020, IFF's legal team represented Dr. Satendra Singh in a Delhi High Court petition concerning the National Digital Health Mission’s Health Data Management policy. The case highlighted how rushed online consultations (with short deadlines and English-only materials) excluded persons with disabilities and those without internet access. The High Court directed the government to consider the petitioner’s representation, pushing for more inclusive and accessible policymaking.

IFF has intervened in multiple cases dealing with the “right to be forgotten” – the idea that individuals can have personal data or court records delisted or removed. In Laksh Vir Singh Yadav v. Union of India (Delhi High Court), IFF joined as an intervenor to oppose creating a broad right to be forgotten via judicial order. IFF argued that without a statutory framework, recognizing such a right could curtail the public’s right to information and free expression. Similarly, IFF supported Indian Kanoon (a legal database) in a Kerala High Court case where a litigant sought removal of a public court judgment from the website. IFF’s position in these cases is that, while privacy is important, an unqualified right to be forgotten threatens transparency and Article 19(1)(a) freedoms.

=== Free Speech and Online Content Regulation ===
IFF provided legal representation to Tanul Thakur, the creator of a satirical website “Dowry Calculator”, in his 2019 petition to the Delhi High Court challenging the arbitrary blocking of his website by the government. The Ministry of Electronics & IT (MeitY) had blocked the site without prior notice, ostensibly under the Dowry Prohibition Act despite the site's plainly satirical nature. IFF argued that the blocking violated due process and free speech, as authorities failed to even attempt contacting the owner (despite his contact info being public). The case exposed how opaque website bans undermine transparency. The Delhi High Court issued notice in late 2019 and the matter is pending adjudication.

IFF has represented several parties in challenges to the IT Rules, 2021, which impose sweeping content regulation and moderation requirements. These cases have been transferred by the Supreme Court to the Delhi High Court: In LiveLaw Media Pvt. Ltd. v. UOI (Kerala High Court), IFF's lawyers represented LiveLaw in its constitutional challenge to the new IT Rules. LiveLaw contends that the Rules especially the oversight mechanism for digital news and “content takedown” orders – violate freedom of speech and are ultra vires since news websites aren't “intermediaries” at all. In March 2021, the Kerala High Court admitted the case and granted interim relief by barring coercive action against LiveLaw protecting the portal pending a final decision. In T.M. Krishna v. UOI (Madras High Court), IFF provided legal assistance to renowned musician and activist T.M. Krishna in another petition challenging the IT Rules, 2021. Krishna argues the Rules infringe upon Article 14 and 19(1)(a) rights by imposing a chilling effect on creative and journalistic expression. In mid-2021, the Madras High Court issued notice and stayed any punitive action under Part III of the Rules, noting the serious issues raised.

Section 66A of the Information Technology Act, 2000, which criminalized “offensive” online messages, was struck down by the Supreme Court in Shreya Singhal v. UOI. Yet authorities kept arresting and charging people under it. In 2018, IFF assisted People's Union for Civil Liberties (PUCL) in the Supreme Court by providing research and legal support for a Miscellaneous Application in the Shreya Singhal case. IFF's “Zombie Tracker” project had uncovered fresh 66A cases even after the ban.The Supreme Court took note and in 2019 directed the closure of all pending cases under 66A and ordered authorities not to register new ones. When reports in 2021 showed continued 66A arrests, IFF again supported PUCL in filing M.A. No. 901/2021 in the Supreme Court. The Court issued notice to the Union government and demanded an explanation for ongoing prosecutions under the defunct law and directed that no new cases should be registered.

IFF's legal team represented the interests of #MeToo whistle-blowers in a 2019 Delhi High Court defamation suit. Artist Subodh Gupta had sued the anonymous Instagram handle “Herdsceneand” (and media outlets) for publicizing sexual harassment allegations against him. IFF argued that gagging such reporting would undermine both free press and the #MeToo movement's goal of accountability.

=== Surveillance, Anonymity and Security ===
IFF is the lead petitioner in Internet Freedom Foundation v. UOI, a case urging surveillance reform. In 2019, IFF filed a petition in the Supreme Court questioning the constitutionality of India's current electronic surveillance framework, which allows broad telephone and internet interception under the Telegraph Act and IT Act. The petition seeks systemic reform demanding safeguards like judicial oversight and challenging blanket surveillance orders that violate privacy (post-Puttaswamy right to privacy precedent). The Supreme Court issued a notice in this case, which remains pending. This effort is aimed at bringing India's surveillance practices in line with fundamental rights, marking one of the first post-privacy-verdict attempts to get judicial scrutiny over government spying programs.

IFF intervened in a high-profile Supreme Court case originally filed in the Madras High Court where the petitioner sought to require linking social media accounts with Aadhaar or government IDs as a way to curb online misinformation. The Madras HC had expanded that PIL to examine whether platforms like WhatsApp could be forced to trace message originators. IFF opposed these measures, filing an intervention application emphasizing that mandatory ID linking and traceability would devastate online privacy and free speech. In court, IFF provided a defense of end-to-end encryption and anonymous speech, arguing that any attempt to weaken encryption or eliminate anonymity would harm citizens’ fundamental rights. Facebook had the various ID-linking cases consolidated and transferred to the Supreme Court, where this matter (commonly dubbed the “WhatsApp traceability/Aadhaar-social media linking” case) is pending.

In 2022, IFF provided legal support to petitioner S. Q. Masood in the Telangana High Court who was challenging the legality of Hyderabad police's use of facial recognition technology (FRT). Masood, a Hyderabad-based activist, filed a PIL in 2021–22 arguing that the Hyderabad City Police's expansive use of facial recognition lacks legal basis, is unnecessary and disproportionate, and operates without safeguards. IFF helped draft the petition and lent expertise from its Project Panoptic (which tracks FRT use). In January 2022, the High Court's Chief Justice bench issued notice to the state and police, taking cognizance of the serious privacy issues raised. This case is ongoing, but it has prompted public debate about surveillance tech. The roots of this litigation trace back to a legal notice Masood sent after the police stopped him in the street, had him remove his mask, and photographed him without his consent.

=== Internet Shutdowns and Network Access ===
IFF played a key role in litigation to end the protracted internet shutdown in Jammu and Kashmir (J&K) after August 2019. Notably, IFF provided legal assistance to the Foundation for Media Professionals (FMP) in multiple proceedings. IFF actively supported journalist Anuradha Bhasin’s Supreme Court petition by drafting representations and filing Right to Information (RTI) requests about the government’s use of telecom suspension powers. In a landmark judgment, the Supreme Court held that indefinite internet bans violate the telecom rules and that all shutdown orders must be published and legally justified. This established for the first time that internet access is integral to fundamental rights.

With the assistance of IFF’s legal team, FMP petitioned the Supreme Court to restore 4G mobile internet during the COVID-19 lockdowns, when only slow 2G service was allowed. In response, the Supreme Court in May 2020 ordered the government to form a special committee to review the blanket 4G restrictions. Under continued pressure, the government gradually lifted the 4G ban (first in two districts, then across J&K by February 2021). This was a significant victory for digital rights, catalyzing the restoration of full internet services in the region. when authorities delayed acting on the Court’s orders, IFF-supported counsel for FMP filed a contempt petition against Union Home Secretary, Ajay Bhalla. This move kept the pressure on the government. During these proceedings, the government conceded to restore 4G on a trial basis. Eventually, the contempt matter was closed once restoration of 4G internet was underway.

IFF’s legal interventions have set important precedents beyond J&K. The precedent that “access to the Internet is a fundamental right” was reaffirmed by the Supreme Court in 2025 in Pragya Prasun vs Union Of India, in a case involving e-KYC barriers for disabled persons. That case was built on the Anuradha Bhasin logic and declared digital access an intrinsic part of Article 21. IFF's earlier litigation on shutdowns and its public advocacy were referenced in media discussions of this verdict.

In 2019, IFF filed a PIL in the Gujarat High Court challenging the preventive banning of the PUBG Mobile app. Several districts in Gujarat had imposed orders to outlaw the game under Section 144 of the Code of Criminal Procedure, leading to some arrests of students for simply playing the game. IFF's petition argued that such bans on apps without clear legal basis or due process were an abuse of power and violated the right to access the internet freely. Although the Gujarat High Court ultimately refused to entertain the petition, declining to intervene in the police's Section 144 orders, the case brought national attention to the issue of arbitrary digital bans. IFF's advocacy highlighted that knee-jerk app bans (absent legislation) threaten innovation and users’ rights.

=== Legal Notices ===
Apart from courtroom litigation, IFF frequently uses legal notices as a tool to protect digital rights. These are formal letters to government authorities or companies, often a precursor to litigation, highlighting unlawful actions and demanding remedies. Such notices sometimes achieve the desired outcome without needing a court case. Below are key instances of IFF's legal notices and their outcomes:

In 2022, IFF represented VideoLAN, the developer of VLC, after Indian ISPs mysteriously blocked VLC's website nationwide. IFF helped VideoLAN serve a legal notice to the Department of Telecom (DoT) and MeitY in September 2022, demanding to know the legal order behind the ban and seeking an opportunity to be heard. Within a month, the government lifted the ban. In November 2022, MeitY removed the blocks on VLC's site.

When the National Crime Records Bureau (NCRB) floated a revised Request For Proposals for a nationwide Automated Facial Recognition System (AFRS) in 2019, IFF raised the alarm. IFF sent a legal notice to NCRB in August 2019 urging it to halt and withdraw the tender, citing serious privacy and constitutional concerns. IFF argued that deploying facial recognition at such scale, without a data protection law or safeguards, would violate fundamental rights. NCRB responded to IFF's notice though it did not cancel the project, the engagement forced the Bureau to acknowledge civil liberties concerns. The notice also generated media scrutiny on AFRS. Subsequently, the project's implementation timelines saw delays, and the issue of facial recognition is now under examination in courts, as noted above in the Telangana case.

In June 2019, IFF served a legal notice to the Delhi Government challenging its massive CCTV camera installation initiative. The notice, which was covered in the press, warned that the plan “will lead to a surveillance state” and is essentially a voyeur's dream if not properly regulated. IFF demanded that the project be paused until a privacy impact assessment and legal framework were in place. The Delhi Government, while publicly defending the CCTV plan, set up a citizen monitoring committee and promised that footage would be subject to privacy norms. Although cameras were installed, IFF's action seeded public debate on surveillance in Delhi and put authorities on notice that blanket monitoring would face legal challenge.

In April 2020, IFF sent a detailed legal notice to Broadcast Engineering Consultants India Ltd (BECIL), a government PSU, regarding its tender for procuring employee tracking smartwatches and a “COVID-19 Patient Tracking Tool.” IFF asserted that the proposed system involving GPS tracking wearables for health workers and a mass surveillance database for COVID patients would “certainly injure the constitutional rights to privacy, dignity, and security” of privacy. The notice demanded the tender be modified to include privacy safeguards or be withdrawn.

In late 2021, IFF assisted in drafting a legal notice to the Hyderabad City Police Commissioner after reports emerged of police officers randomly stopping people and searching their mobile phones for keywords like “ganja” (as part of a drug crackdown). The notice argued that these warrantless phone searches were illegal and violated privacy. Notably, IFF supported S.Q. Masood in sending this notice when he was forced to remove his mask and had his photo taken by police on the street.

== Publications ==
Over the past decade the Internet Freedom Foundation (IFF) has produced a wide portfolio of policy briefs, open-data trackers, consultation submissions and advocacy research that underpin its litigation and campaigning. The publications are organised around several recurring themes such as data protection, surveillance, connectivity, platform governance and economic regulation. These have been cited by courts, regulators, parliamentary committees and the press. IFF also prepares “Parliamentarians’ Guides” ahead of the Budget, Monsoon and Winter sessions of Parliament, highlighting pressing digital rights issues like data privacy, platform regulation, and censorship for lawmakers’ attention.

=== Artificial Intelligence ===
The Internet Freedom Foundation (IFF) produces regular research and advocacy on artificial intelligence policy in India, ranging from its 2019 comments on the Department of Telecommunications’ “Indian AI Stack” concept and its critique of NITI Aayog's draft #AIforAll enforcement framework to more recent submissions on the Ministry of Electronics and IT's 2025 AI Governance Guidelines. IFF pairs these policy briefs with right-to-information campaigns that press public bodies to disclose details of state-led AI projects and procurement, culminating in an open letter to the National Institute for Smart Government that demanded proactive transparency for all pilot deployments. Its thematic blog series has also examined private-sector uses of AI that implicate civil liberties such as Airtel's machine-learning web-filter, which IFF argued could enable unchecked censorship.

=== Data Protection, Surveillance and Privacy ===
During Covid, IFF authored a comprehensive working paper to inform public policy formation in India, including a substantive analysis of the use and publication of health data, specific development of surveillance technologies and deployment of contact tracing through device applications. IFF's flagship Public Brief on the draft Digital Personal Data Protection Bill, 2022 set out constitutional and procedural concerns and was publicly released during the consultation window. Follow-up statements on the 2023 and 2025 iterations detailed loopholes around government exemptions and cross-border transfers. The Economic Times, Moneylife and Global Government Forum each quoted IFF's analysis when reporting on the Bill's “surveillance” risks. In 2022 IFF's public advocacy against the national railway company's plan to monetize passenger data (articulated through online briefs and social media) led the Indian Railways to withdraw the proposal, with the issue even being taken up by a Parliamentary committee for scrutiny. Through the #SaveOurPrivacy campaign, IFF and allied groups drafted a model data protection law (the “Indian Privacy Code, 2018”), which was introduced twice in Parliament as a Private Member's Bill by Shashi Tharoor and D. Ravi Kumar; this effort brought accountability and influence to the official drafting process of India's personal data protection legislation. Through Project Panoptic—an open database and series of city reports IFF has tracked more than 120 government FRT tenders. Media outlets such as WIRED, Al Jazeera and The Times of India have relied on Panoptic data in stories highlighting low accuracy thresholds and privacy gaps in deployments by Delhi Police and school systems. Monthly RTI digests published on IFF's site catalogue the information requests that feed the tracker and have spurred further press scrutiny of unregulated FRT trials.

=== Digital Competition and Telecom Regulation ===
In May 2024, IFF filed a detailed consultation submission on the draft Digital Competition Bill, focusing on user-choice frictions and due-process gaps; the submission forms part of the public record and complements sector commentary from think-tanks and trade media. IFF has used similar briefs to critique AI-based content-filtering trials by telecom operators. IFF has been one of the most prolific civil-society commentators on India's overhaul of telecom law. Since the first consultation draft appeared in 2022, it has issued a stream of public briefs, clause-by-clause submissions and explanatory blog posts on the Telecommunications Act 2023 and every set of draft rules published under it. These documents critique expansive surveillance powers, argue for clearer definitions, and flag procedural gaps; they are routinely quoted by trade press and mainstream media and have informed broader civil-society campaigns that persuaded the government to extend comment deadlines and release revised drafts.

=== Digital Public Infrastructure ===
IFF treats India's expanding “digital public infrastructure” as a distinct policy track and has built a small but visible body of publications around it. When MeitY floated its National Open Digital Ecosystem (NODE) strategy in 2020, IFF filed a formal consultation submission that called for privacy-by-design standards and independent audits of shared platforms. From 2021 onward the foundation produced thematic explainers on individual DPI schemes: a primer on the agrarian data platform AgriStack, a series dissecting the payment-layer model behind UPI and its proposed e-commerce clone ONDC, and a budget-season brief analysing how flagship programmes such as Aadhaar, Digi Yatra and DigiLocker fit the government's DPI narrative. In 2023, IFF joined global debates by submitting detailed feedback to the UNDP “Universal DPI Safeguards” draft, urging stronger language on data-minimisation and algorithmic transparency.

=== Internet shutdowns, censorship and connectivity ===
In 2018, IFF supported a research paper by Nakul Nayak who studied the constitutional implications of internet shutdowns in India from the lens of administrative law. Subsequently, in 2023, IFF co-authored the 82-page report “No Internet Means No Work, No Pay, No Food” with Human Rights Watch (HRW), documenting the socioeconomic harm of shutdowns and providing district-level case studies. IFF's joint report on internet shutdowns with HRW garnered international attention, underscoring how shutdowns violate fundamental rights and bolstering calls for reform in India. Findings from this study have been reproduced in national and international coverage of prolonged black-outs, including TIME’s examination of the 2023–25 Manipur crisis. In addition, various members of its team have published op-eds on internet shutdowns. IFF also publishes a recurring “Connectivity Tracker”. Launched in 2021 under the hashtag #MapTheDigitalDivide, the project releases quarterly briefs that use TRAI and census data on wireless subscriptions, broadband uptake, gender and rural-urban gaps, and the progress of government schemes such as BharatNet and PM-GDISHA. Subsequent edition add metrics on mobile download speeds and State-level smartphone penetration.

=== Platform governance, disinformation and free expression ===
Policy briefs and legal analysis on intermediary liability informed IFF's advocacy during the 2022 nine-month blocking of VLC Media Player.

A joint 2024 investigation with Global Witness tested reporting tools on YouTube and Koo, finding that misogynistic content stayed online despite policy violations; the results were published as a brief and widely covered by international media and NGOs.

When Karnataka released its draft Misinformation and Fake News (Prohibition) Bill, 2025, IFF published an explanatory note and coordinated an open letter urging redrafting; Deccan Herald quoted the brief in a front-page report on free-speech risks.

== Funding and Transparency ==
IFF runs on a small budget primarily through a domestic, community-funded model. Nearly all income comes from small, repeat donations by Indian citizens, channelled through a low-fee donation programmes and periodic crowdfunding pushes. This has been supplemented by organisational donations, grants and support by philanthropies and companies. It also publishes monthly transparency reports and is rated by Guidestar and Credibility Alliance.

== Awards ==
- Prix Ars Electronica 2022 (Honorary Mention)
- Global Privacy Assembly (GPA) Privacy and Human Rights Award 2025
