= DIGIPUB =

Indian non-profit organization

DIGIPUB News India Foundation
- Abbreviation: DIGIPUB
- Formation: 27 October 2020
- Type: NGO
- Purpose: Advocacy for digital news media organizations
- Members: Digital news media organizations; "Independent journalists"; Commentators
- Secretary General: Ritu Kapur; Abhinandan Sekhri
- Chairperson: Dhanya Rajendran
- Board of directors: Ritu Kapur; Aniruddha Bahal; Abhinandan Sekhri; Sujit Nair; Dhanya Rajendran; Samar Harlankar; Meena Kotwal
- Website: www.digipubindia.in

The DIGIPUB News India Foundation is an Indian non-profit organization formed by digital media organizations.

== Founding members ==
Organizations:

- Alt News
- Article 14
- Boomlive
- Cobrapost
- HW News
- Newsclick
- Newslaundry
- Scroll
- The News Minute
- The Quint
- The Wire
- The Better India
- Main Media

Notable members include Awadh Punch, Barkha Dutt Media, Citizen Matters, Countercurrents.org, Dalit Camera, EastMojo, and Ravish Kumar.

== Individual or commentariat ==
- Ravish Kumar
- Ajit Anjum
- Alok Joshi
- Vinod Dua
- Akash Banerji
- Faye DeSouza
- Paranjoy Guha Thakurta
- Neha Dixit
- Abrar Bhat

== Members ==
No.	Member
1	A18 Telangana News
2	Anweshanam
3	Asia Villa
4	Atul Ashok Howale
5	Awadh Punch
6	Azhimukham Media
7	Bar and Bench
8	Barkha Dutt Media
9	Citizen Matters
10	Clarion India
11	Countercurrents.org
12	Dalit Camera
13	Dastak Live News
14	DoolNews
15	East Mojo
16	ED Times
17	ENEWSROOM INDIA
18	Evartha
19	Suno India
20	FactChecker
21	Fact Crescendo
22	Finshots
23	Newsmeter
24	Health Check
25	In The News
26	India Spend
27	Indian Writers Forum
28	Guwahati Plus
29	Kafila
30	Life News
31	MaxMaharashtra Media
32	Media Nama
33	Media Vigil
34	Millat Times
35	MXM India
36	News Moments
37	NEZINE MEDIA
38	Nicobar Times
39	NorthEast Now
40	OMMCOM News
41	Opoyi
42	People’s Archive of Rural India
43	PSB Media
44	Satya Hindi
45	SouthLive
46	The Citizen
47	THE CUE
48	The India Forum
49	The Ken
50	The Leaflet
51	The Morning Context
52	The News Mill
53	THE NEWSRUPT
54	The Public India
55	The Shudra
56	The Sikkim Chronicle
57	TIME8
58	True Copy
59	The Better India
60	Vibes Of India
61	Loud India TV
62	Main Media
63	The Probe
64	DB Live
65	Malabar News
66	TeluguPost
67	Behen Box
68	PalPal News
69	India News Stream
70	HashTagU
71	Speak Up India
72	India North East
73	Chalchitra Abhiyaan
74	AanWorld
75	Feminism In India
76	Suno India
77	Headline Network
78	Democratic Charkha
79	Afternoon Voice
80	Deshgaon Media Foundation
81	StraightLine Media
82	InsideNE
83	The Harishchandra
84	Indus News 24×7
85	Reporters’ Collective
86	Smita Sharma
87	Ravish Kumar
88	News AapTak
89	The Probe
90	IBN24 News Network
91	Times Kerala Online
92	News Insider 24×7
93	Sabrang India
94	The Chenab Times

== Leadership ==
- Chairperson – Dhanya Rajendran, The News Minute
- General Secretaries – Ritu Kapur, The Quint & Abhinandan Sekhri, Newslaundry

DIGIPUB has an internal committee to "ensure industry-wide self-regulation, consisting of individuals with a strong public service record and accomplishments". The committee members include:

- Former Supreme Court judge Justice Madan Lokur
- Ms. Swarna Rajagopalan, founder, and director for the Prajnya Trust
- Bezwada Wilson, activist and National Convenor of the Safai Karmachari Andolan

== Membership ==
Organizations/entities and individual journalists/commentators can become members of DIGIPUB by meeting certain criteria. Membership fees and application processes vary for organizations and individuals.

== See also ==
- Tek Fog
