= Abhinandan Sekhri =

Indian journalist (born 1974)

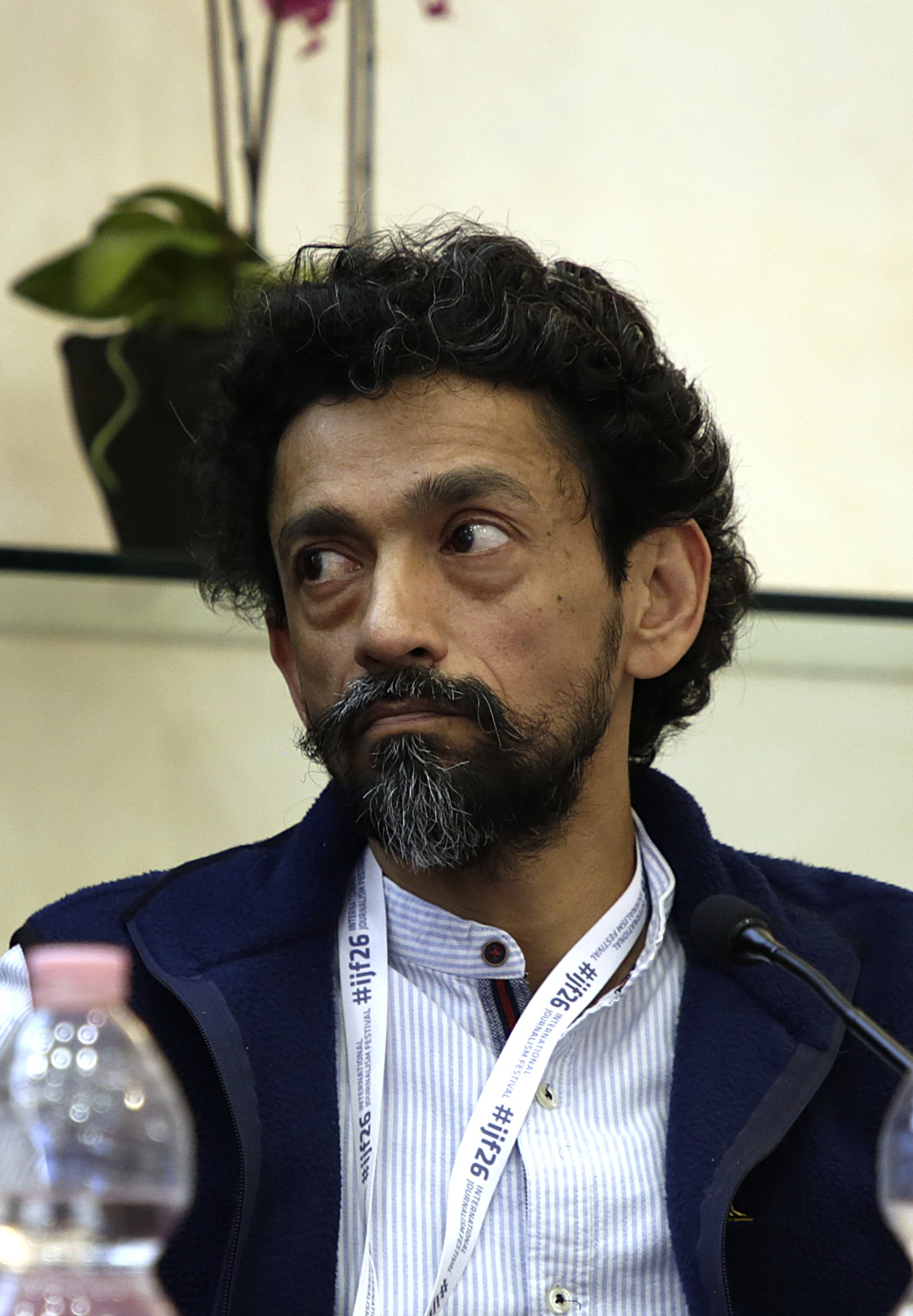
- Sekhri at the International Journalism Festival in 2026
- Born: 1974 (age 51–52)
- Education: Welham Boys' School; The Doon School; University of Delhi
- Occupations: Journalist; Producer, director, actor
- Known for: Co-founder of Newslaundry; Producer, Highway on My Plate

Abhinandan Sekhri (born 4 August 1974) is the co-founder and CEO of Newslaundry, a media critique, news and current affairs website.

== Education ==
Sekhri was educated at the Welham Boys' School and then The Doon School in Dehradun, India. He obtained a bachelor's degree in economics from Hansraj College, University of Delhi.

== Career ==
Before founding Newslaundry, he worked as a producer, director and writer in television and film projects, including Highway on my Plate, which he co-produced and directed; and news-satire show Gustaakhi Maaf. He was also a co-founder and trustee in Delhi-based non-governmental organisation (NGO) PCRF. He was the executive producer for Chase, a documentary series by ScoopWhoop. He regularly delivers lectures and hosts panel discussions on journalism, RTI, and the importance and independence of media.

=== Newstrack and AajTak (1996–1999) ===
In April 1996, he started working as a correspondent for TV Today Network. He reported for Newstrack, a weekly current affairs programme, and for the evening bulletin of Aaj Tak, along with morning show Good Morning Today.

=== Production, direction and writing career & Small Screen (2000–2014) ===
He worked as a camera assistant on Mira Nair’s award-winning feature film Monsoon Wedding which was a Mirabai production. Monsoon Wedding went on to win the 2002 British Independent Film Award for Best Foreign Independent Film – Foreign Language. He then worked as Assistant Director on Filhaal (2000), an Indian feature film produced by Jhamu Sugandh and directed by Meghna Gulzar.

He produced, scripted and co-directed documentary film Chadar along with Prashant Sareen on a winter trade route in the Zanskar valley of Ladakh. Chadar went on to win the Best Travel Documentary Award at the EVEO Spring Fest, 2000 at San Francisco and received a Special Jury Prize at Okinawa, Japan in 2001. He went on to produce and direct several other documentary films including Goonj, a six part series on innovations in agriculture and Daring to Dream, a documentary film about three children in rural Rajasthan. He co-directed and co-scripted documentary films Shared Spaces (a film on religious diversity) and Temples of Water (a documentary film on the water harvesting movement in Rajasthan). Temples of Water was screened at the UNESCO - PSBT Documentary film festival in Delhi in August 2003.

In 2000, Sekhri co-founded Small Screen, a Delhi-based agency that provides audio video production services for television, digital and film-based platforms. Sekhri was the Chief script writer for Double Take and Gustakhi Maaf, a political satire show that aired on NDTV. The show won awards at the Indian Television Academy Awards (2004) and the Indian Telly Awards (2004).

He was the producer, director and scriptwriter for Highway on my Plate which was a travel and food show that ran from 2007 to 2011 on NDTV Good Times. The show won the 'Best Travel Show' at the Indian Telly Awards, 2008. In 2013, Sekhri co-produced Jai Hind with Rocky and Mayur, a show about life in the Armed Forces. He was also the director of the 2014 six-part series, Vital Stats of India on the History Channel, that presented information about India and Indians.

=== Newslaundry (2012–present) ===
In 2012, Sekhri, along with Madhu Trehan, Roopak Kapoor and Prashant Sareen, founded Newslaundry, a media critique, news and current affairs website. The news organisation does not carry advertisements and runs on a subscription-based model. Newslaundry's Manisha Pande, along with Sandeep Pai won the 2015 Ramnath Goenka Excellence in Journalism Award for investigative reporting. Abhinandan is currently the full-time CEO of Newslaundry.
