= Syndications Today =

New Delhi-based content syndication division of the Living Media (India Today) Group

- Type: Content syndicator
- Headquarters: New Delhi
- Owners: Living Media India Ltd.
- Website: http://www.syndicationstoday.com

Syndications Today is the content syndication division of the India Today Group, a media conglomerate in the Indian sub-continent, which manages and grants reprint and reuse rights of content produced in the form of news, articles, features, images and videos from publications such as India Today Magazine, Business Today Magazine, Cosmopolitan India, Good Housekeeping and others, as well as television channels such as Aaj Tak, India Today, Dilli Aajtak and Tez TV.
