= Shiv Inder Singh =

Indian journalist

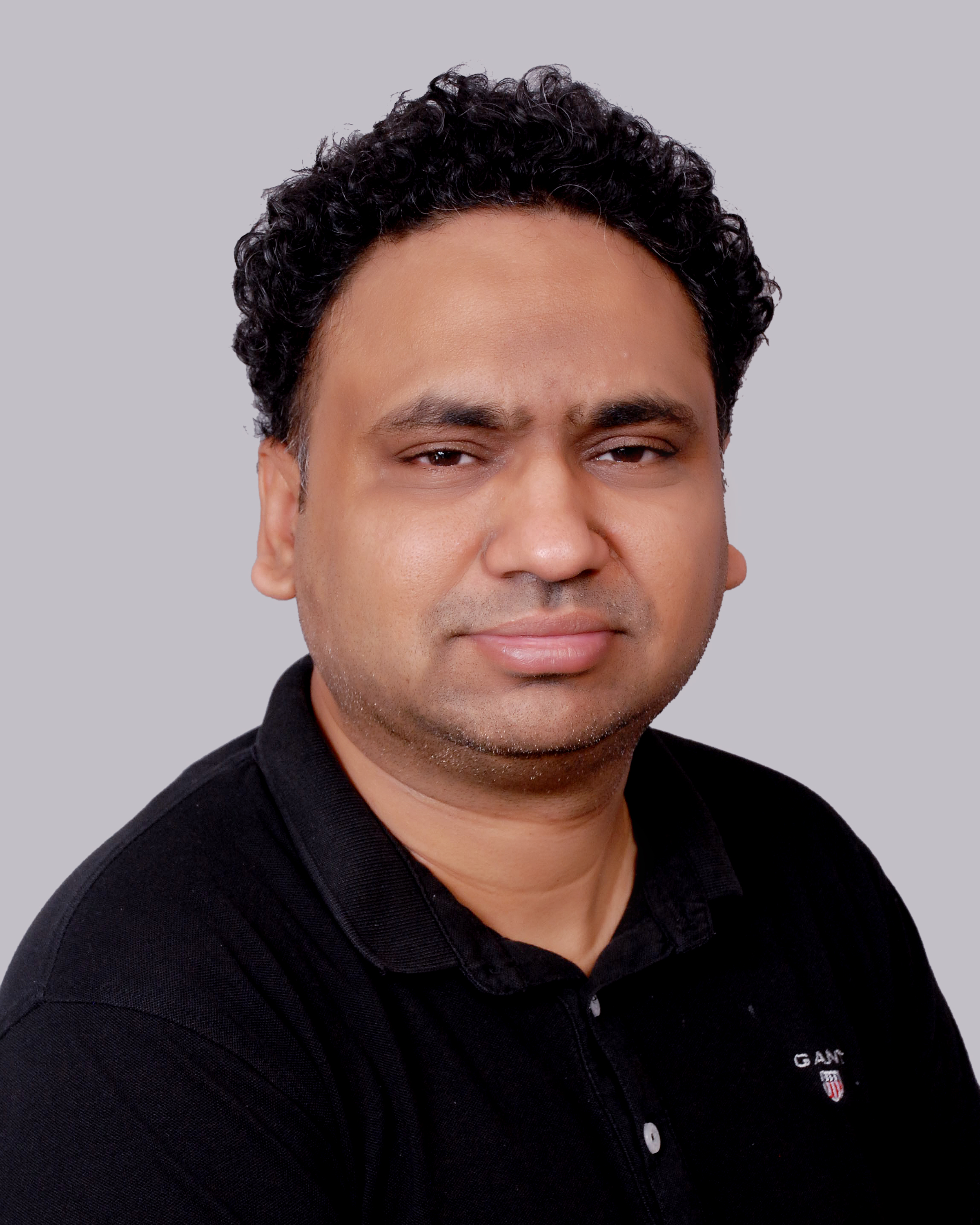
Shiv Inder Singh in August 2022

Shiv Inder Singh (born 1986) is an Indian journalist, currently working as the editor-in-chief for online Punjabi portal, Suhi Saver. In 2017, he won the Zindabad Trust award for Suhi Saver. He won the Jagjit Singh Anand Award for journalism in 2019.

== Biography ==
Born in 1986, Singh hails from the Burj Littan village of Ludhiana district, Punjab. He went on to complete his MA in Journalism and Mass Communication.

He started the online portal Suhi Saver in 2010 and as of September 2012, it supports both the Gurmukhi and Shahmukhi scripts of Punjabi. In October 2014, he started working with Vancouver-based radio Red FM. He was dismissed from the radio due to his criticism of the BJP-led Indian government in July 2016.

He regular writes for the online portals The Caravan, NewsClick and LiveMint since 2019.

== Awards ==
- 2017 - Zindabad Trust Award
- 2019 - Jagjit Singh Anand Award
