= Jaipur Jewellery Show =

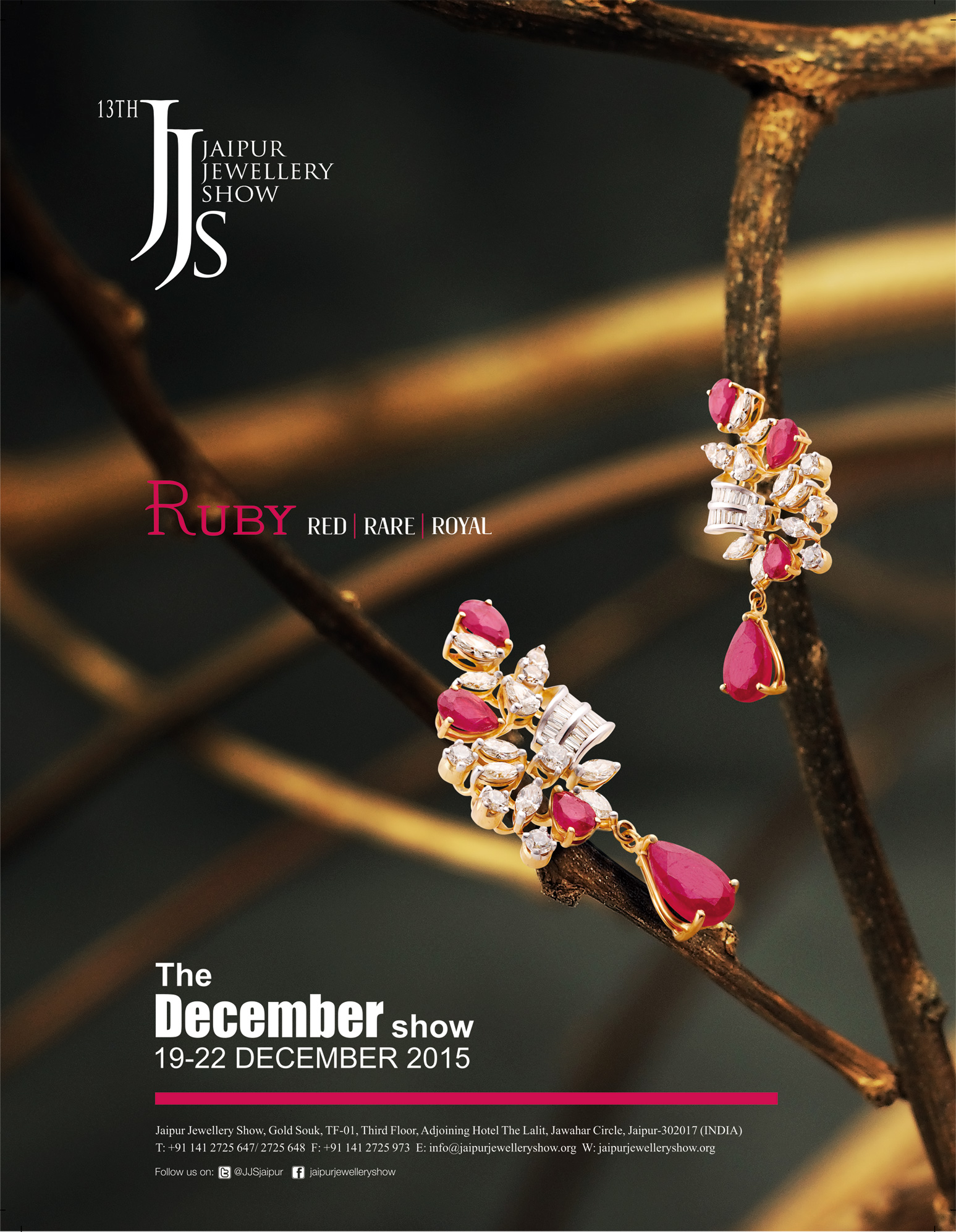
JJS Show 2015 Theme Poster

Jaipur Jewellery Show (JJS) is a B2B & B2C jewelry trade fair held annually in December at the Jaipur Exhibition & Convention Centre, Jaipur.

== TV series based on the show ==
Six episodes of The Jaipur Jewellery Show regarding the jewellery trade there were telecast on NDTV Good Times, prior to the 13th JJS in 2015, where JJS's brand ambassador—Amrita Rao, a Bollywood actress, wore the jewellery designs and interviewed the jewellery brand owners and designers.

== Themes of JJS ==
JJS-2015 had the theme RUBY – Red | Rare | Royal. Savio Jewellery's peacock ring was displayed in JJS, holding a world record for the most number of diamonds in a single ring. Rajasthan's CM Vasundhara Raje inaugurated the show. JJS-2021 had the theme of "It's time to sparkle".

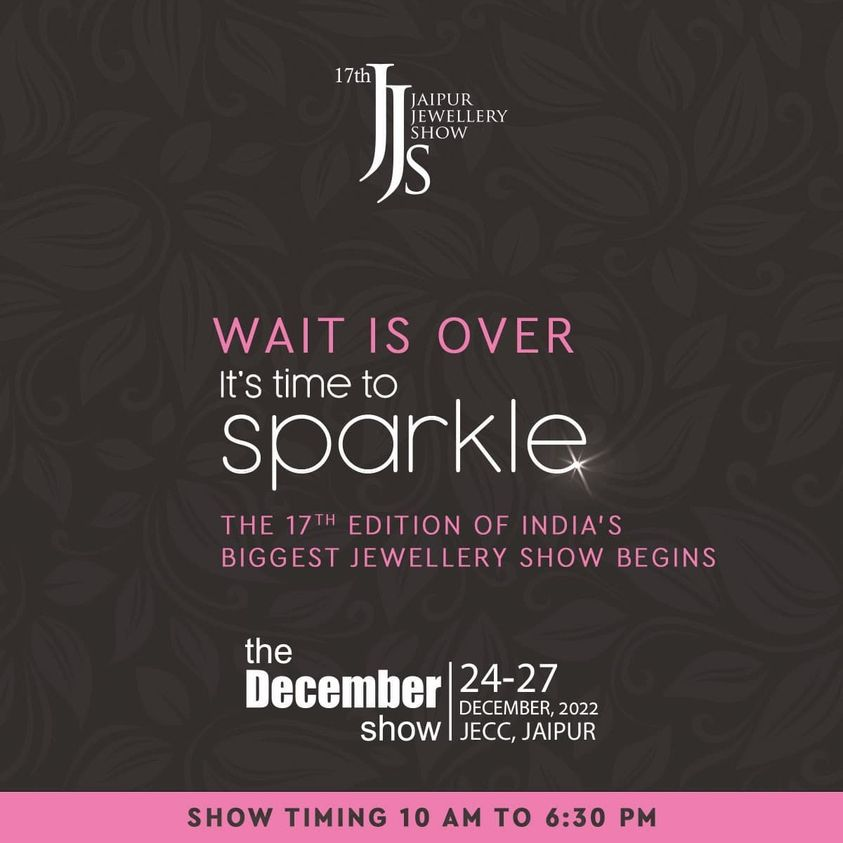
JJS 2021 Theme Poster

== See also ==
- Jewellery § Indian subcontinent
