= Dilli Aaj Tak =

Indian Hindi-language television channel

- Country: India
- Broadcast area: India
- Network: Broadcast television and online
- Headquarters: Noida, India

Programming
- Language: Hindi
- Picture format: 4:3 (576i SDTV)

Ownership
- Owner: Living Media
- Sister channels: Aaj Tak; India Today; Good News Today; Aaj Tak HD

History
- Launched: 2006; 20 years ago
- Closed: 2020; 6 years ago

Links
- Website: aajtak.intoday.in/dilliaajtak/

Dilli Aaj Tak was a 24-hour Hindi news television channel covering Delhi owned by TV Today Network. It was a sister channel of Aaj Tak. Dilli Aaj Tak initially began as a news bulletin on a public television station in India and turned to an independent channel after the carrier did not renew its contract.

The channel suspended on 30 June 2020 due to financial problems created by COVID-19 lockdown in India.

== See also ==
- List of television stations in India
