= Newslaundry =

Indian news portal

- Available in: 2 languages
- List of languages English, Hindi
- Headquarters: Delhi, India
- Key people: Abhinandan Sekhri; Madhu Trehan; Prashant Sareen
- Website: www.newslaundry.com
- Users: 50,000+ paying subscribers (as of July 2024)
- Launched: 6 February 2012; 14 years ago
- Current status: Active

Newslaundry is an Indian left-leaning media watchdog that provides media critique, reportage and satirical commentary. It was founded in 2012 by Abhinandan Sekhri, Madhu Trehan and Prashant Sareen, all of whom earlier worked in print or television journalism. It is regarded as the first subscription-based news platform in India, operating solely on revenue from public subscriptions rather than donations or advertisements.

Newslaundry has faced multiple defamation, copyright lawsuits and scrutiny over its handling of workplace sexual harassment allegations and POSH complaints.

== History ==
Newslaundry does not rely on advertisement for its revenue, and claims to be solely reliant on subscriptions for their income. The subscriptions allows users access to all stories and podcasts, such as NL Hafta and Let's Talk About, interactions with the Newslaundry team and subscriber only events and discord server.

In addition to ground reporting and satirical commentary, Newslaundry hosts many podcasts dedicated to politics, culture and entertainment such as the flagship current affairs podcast NL Hafta and Awful and Awesome.

Newslaundry has developed shows such as Clothesline (hosted by Madhu Trehan, currently on hiatus), Ye Bhi Theek Hai (hosted by Kunal Kamra and Sanjay Rajoura), TV Newsance (hosted by Manisha Pande), Back in Time, and NL Tippani (hosted by Atul Chaurasia) – all of which either probe and critique the Indian media through satire or explore socio-political issues in depth.

== Awards ==
In 2015, executive editor Manisha Pande and Sandeep Pai reported on how politicians misuse the public sector undertakings in India. Their work won the Ramnath Goenka Excellence in Journalism Award for investigative reporting.

=== WAN-IFRA Digital Media Awards Worldwide (2024) ===
The Newslaundry app was honored as the 'Best Innovative Digital Product' at the World Association of News Publishers' Digital Media Awards Worldwide. The jury commended the app for prioritizing user-centric strategies in a subscription-based model.

== Lawsuits ==
=== BCCL defamation lawsuit ===
On 19 January 2021, the Bennett, Coleman, and Company Limited (BCCL), also commonly known as The Times Group, filed a ₹100 crore civil defamation suit against Newslaundry in the Bombay High Court. The suit alleged that Newslaundry had defamed the director of the BCCL Vineet Jain, as well as Rahul Shivshankar and Navika Kumar, who are the editors of their news channel Times Now. It claimed that an episode of Newslaundry's TV Newsance uploaded on 10 October 2020, which criticised the news channel for its coverage of the arrest of actress Rhea Chakraborty, was "beyond the realm of satire, parody or spoof" and "false, baseless and highly defamatory". It further also claimed that the video uploaded on their channel on 27 November 2020 titled Explained: How to rig TRP defamed and maligned the images of Shivashankar and Kumar.

Newslaundry responded to this suit by claiming that the legal notices was an attempt to silence criticism and also said that "no one including media should be above scrutiny".

=== TV Today Group lawsuit ===
On 26 October 2021, the India Today Group who run the English channel India Today and Hindi channel Aaj Tak filed a ₹2,00,00,100 civil defamation suit against Newslaundry in the Delhi High Court. The group also claimed that Newslaundry was "piggybacking" on the network and violating its copyright and that Newslaundry has harmed the channel's reputation.

The lawsuit sought to remove 34 articles published on the Newslaundry website and 65 videos on the portal's YouTube channel. Furthermore, the suite seeks to remove similar content from Newslaundry's social media on Facebook and Twitter. The group also struck their YouTube channel was with fifty three copyright strikes which led to five videos being taken down and their channel being frozen for a period of three weeks where Newslaundry was barred from uploading any new videos.

In response to this, Newslaundry co-founder Abhinandan Sekhri in a statement made to Scroll.in claimed that the case was frivolous. He said:

It is alarming that these [organisations] are considered the high priests of independent news, free speech and freedom of the press. Now we know why the press and media has come to this stage.... Because of people like the ones in the management of India Today who think that this is a sensible lawsuit. If I were to review a book and I took a paragraph from it, no one goes around accusing me of copyright infringement of the book, but if someone critiques these news channel...since they are not used to being critiqued, they suddenly say that it is copyright infringement.... When we are calling something out, we have to show what we are calling out.

Newslaundry has contested that Section 52 of the Indian Copyright Act provides for six exceptions one of which is to criticise or review the original content, and hence claimed that this suit is frivolous as it falls outside the purview of copyright. In another statement made to the Indian Express, Abhinandan Sekhri said:

What is alarming to me is that these are the people who are supposed to stand up for a free press and freedom of speech. India Today, which prides itself as a self-congratulatory, fantastic news brand, if this is their understanding of free press and freedom of speech, it explains the dismal state of media.

=== Sakal Group lawsuit ===
On 16 September 2020, the Sakal Media group filed a ₹65 crore defamation notice on Newslaundry for news reports they published and FIR is against the reporter as he used Sakal's trademark logo. Newslaundry published news on 11 June 2020 about employment terminations of employees in Sakal Times happened in May 2020, later Sakal Media Group legal department cleared the FIR, filed on 16 September, was only against the reporter for Trademark Infringement in his story and not against Newslaundry. Further investigation is ongoing.

== Criticism ==
=== Delhi Commission for Women scrutiny ===
In August 2026, the Delhi Commission for Women (DCW) said that it is looking into complaints regarding Newslaundry's handling of sexual harassment complaints, workplace culture, and implementation of the Prevention of Sexual Harassment (POSH) mechanism.

After the news website retracted an opinion piece addressing the Tarun Tejpal's sexual assault case, several former employees including senior staff raised separate unverified allegations on social media about its workplace culture and the functioning of its Internal Complaints Committee.
