= PCRF =

PCRF may refer to:

- Palestine Children's Relief Fund
- Policy and charging rules function
- Public Cause Research Foundation
- Parti Communiste Révolutionnaire de France
