= Punya Prasun Bajpai =

Indian journalist

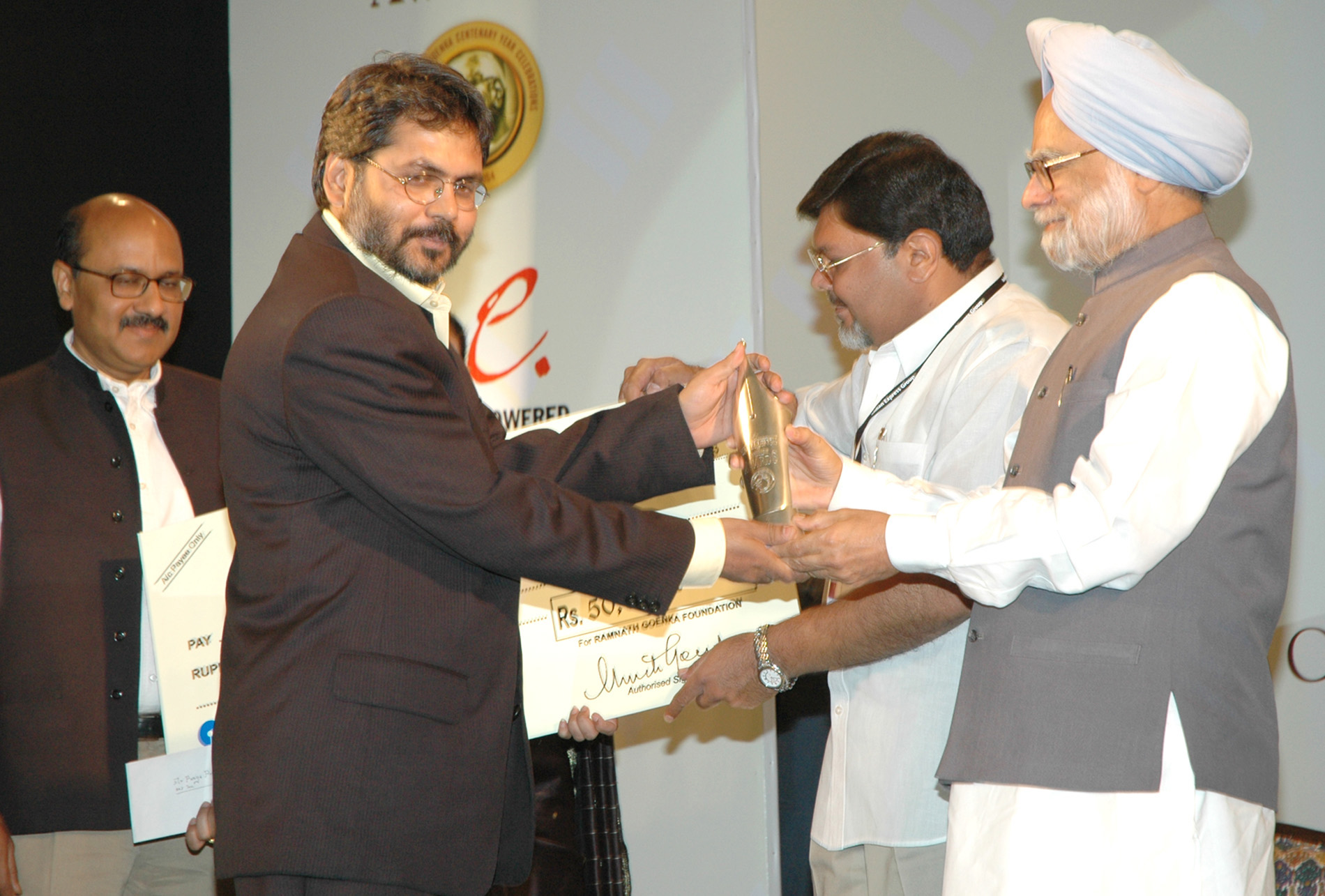
- Born: 18 March 1963 (age 63); Muzaffarpur, Bihar, India
- Occupations: News anchor, journalist, editor, author
- Years active: 1989–present
- Employer: Former executive editor at Aaj Tak
- Notable credit(s): DusTak on Aaj Tak, Master Stroke on ABP News, Badi Khabar on Zee News
- Height: 5 ft 7 in (170 cm)
- Awards: Ramnath Goenka 2006 and 2008

YouTube information
- Channel: Punya Prasun Bajpai
- Subscribers: 5.2M
- Views: 1.4 billion
- Last updated: 19 June 2025

Punya Prasun Bajpai (born 18 March 1964) is an Indian journalist. He has worked at several news networks in his career, including Aaj Tak, where he hosted the weekday show known as 10 तक, and ABP News, where he hosted Masterstroke for four months in 2018.

Bajpai is a well-known name in the field of electronic media, with more than 29 years of experience in electronic and print media. Bajpai has worked with various reputed media agencies such as Jansatta, Sunday Observer, Sunday Mail, Lokmat, Zee News and NDTV.

== Early life ==
He was born in Muzaffarpur, Bihar. His father is the late Mani Kant Bajpai, who was an IIS (Indian Information Service) officer. He did his schooling at Kendriya Vidyalaya, Kankarbagh, Patna and subsequently did his graduation in Political Science honours from Bihar National College, Patna.

== Career ==
Bajpai started his career in the electronic media with Aaj Tak in 1996 and worked there until 2003. He then moved to NDTV for a tenure of fourteen months. In 2007–2008, he was Editor-in-Chief of Sahara Samay. He worked at Zee News for four years as a prime-time anchor and editor before returning to Aaj Tak. Bajpai began hosting Masterstroke on ABP News in April, but he resigned four months later on 1 August 2018, due to alleged political pressure on the news channel. In February 2019, he joined Surya Samachar as Editor-in-Chief, where he also hosted the shows Jai Hind and Satta. Recently he gave up Surya Samachar.

In March 2014 he attracted controversy when in a video of interview with Arvind Kejriwal, he was seen getting instructions from Kejriwal on promoting his interview by comparing his resignation to the sacrifice of Bhagat Singh and dropping a certain portion of interview on privatization of industries which would portray him anti-middle class. Later, when the interview was telecasted, Bajpai was alleged to have actually complied to the instructions which raised questions on his journalistic integrity and ethics. Aaj Tak rejected these charges. AAP spokesperson remarked, "The interview was shown live and without any cuts, and this is purely an attempt by vested interests to malign us. Arvindji has not said or done anything wrong, and this is a desperate attempt to show him in poor light."

In 2015, Bajpai was one of the ten most active Indian journalists on Twitter.

Since 2019, he runs his own news channel on YouTube.

== Publications ==
Bajpai has published six books, including राजनीति मेरी जान (Raajneeti Meri Jaan), डिजास्टरः मीडिया एंड पॉलिटिक्स (Disaster: Media and Politics), संसदः लोकतंत्र या नजरों का धोखा (Sansad: Loktantra ya nazron ka dhokha), आदिवासियों पर टाडा (Aadivasiyon par TADA), R.S.S. Sangh Ka Safar: 100 varsh and others. He writes articles for a number of daily and weekly news and literary publications in Hindi, several of which are also published on his blog.

== Awards ==
- He received recognition of his work during the 2001 Indian Parliament attack when he anchored live for five consecutive hours.
- He won the Ramnath Goenka award for Hindi print and electronic media in 2005–06 and 2007–08. He is the only journalist to have received this award in TV and print twice.
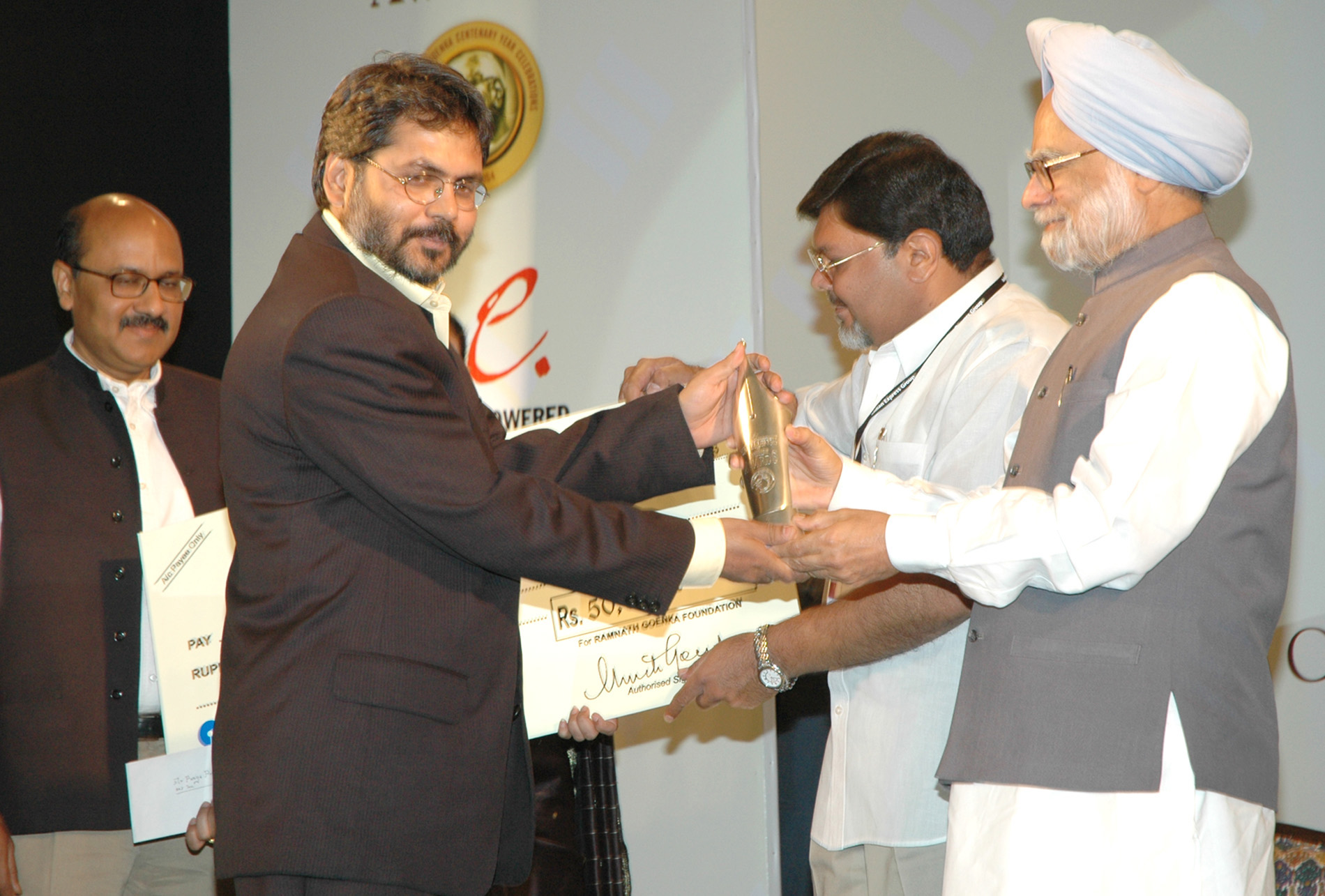
  Punya Prasun Bajpai receiving the Ramnath Goenka Award for Excellence in Journalism from the Prime Minister, Dr. Manmohan Singh in 2006

== Resignation from ABP News ==
Bajpai hosted a prime-time show on ABP News called Masterstroke. In July 2018, the channel elicited criticism from the government for its story about a video interaction on 20 June 2018, between Prime Minister Mr. Narendra Modi and beneficiaries of various government programmes. A participant from Chhattisgarh, Chandramani Kaushik, told Modi on the show that her income had doubled after she switched from cultivating paddy to growing custard apples. Two weeks later, based on reports from ABP News Masterstroke claims that she had been tutored by BJP officials to make false claims.

Following this, ABP News' satellite link started misbehaving during the airing of Bajpai's show. In an article written by Bajpai for The Wire, he claims that some advertisers, including Patanjali, withdrew their advertisements from the channel. Under this pressure, Bajpai was forced to resign from the channel.

== See also ==
- Ravish Kumar
- Abhisar Sharma
