= Aroon Purie =

Indian businessman and journalist

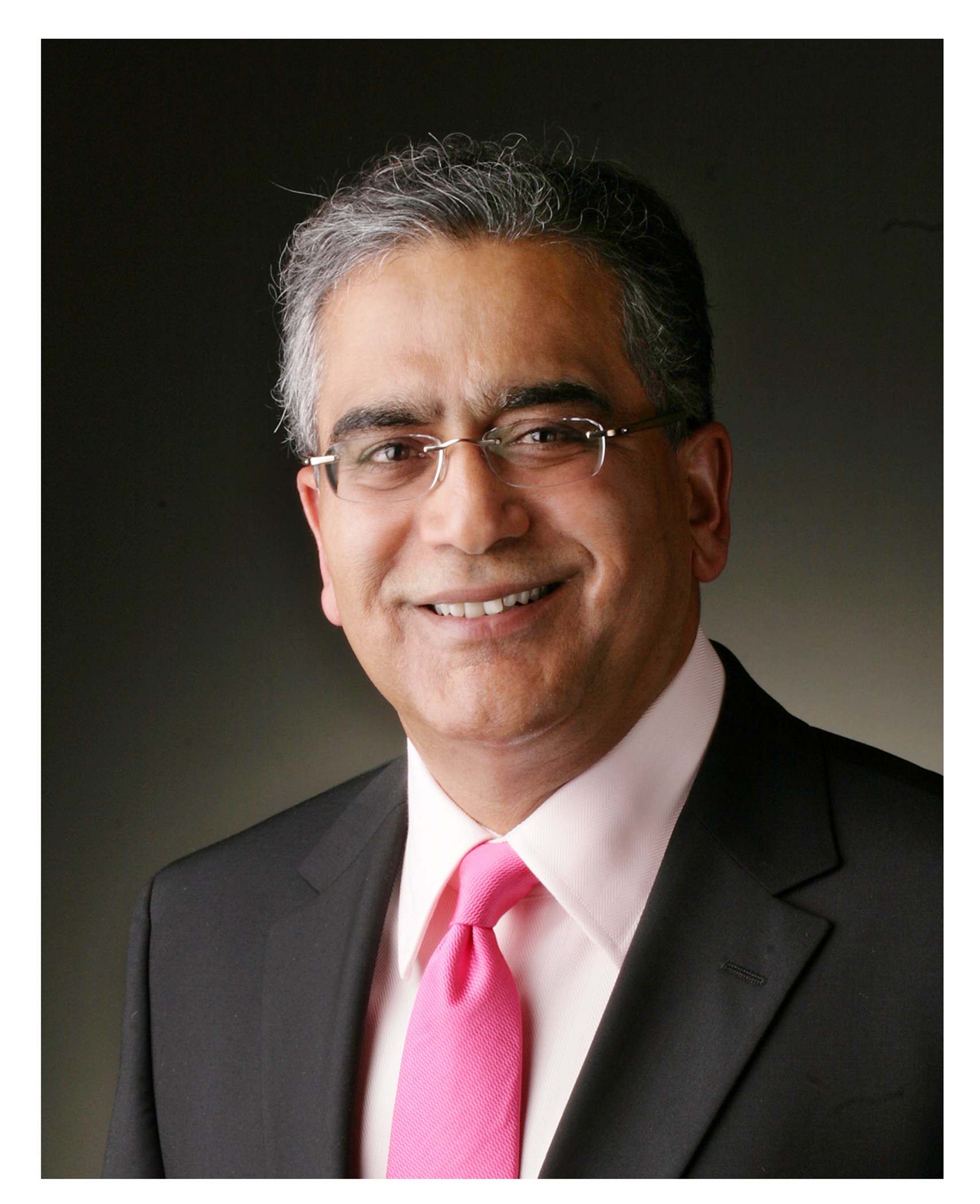
- Purie in 2008
- Born: 1944 (age 81–82); Lahore, Punjab Province, British India
- Education: The Doon School; London School of Economics
- Occupation: Businessman Journalist
- Title: Founder of India Today Group
- Children: 3, including Koel Purie
- Relatives: Madhu Trehan (sister)
- Awards: Padma Bhushan, 2001

Aroon Purie (born 1944) is the founder-publisher and editor-in-chief of India Today, and former chief executive of the India Today Group. He is the managing director of Thomson Press (India) Limited and the chairman and managing director of TV Today. He is a recipient of the Padma Bhushan award. He was also the editor-in-chief of Reader's Digest India. In October 2017, he passed control of the India Today Group to his daughter, Kalli Purie.

== Early life ==
Purie graduated from The Doon School (where his contemporary was Rajiv Gandhi, former Indian prime minister) and earned a bachelor's degree in economics from the London School of Economics in 1965. Bollywood actress Koel Purie is his youngest daughter.

== Career ==
He started his career in 1970 at Thomson Press as Production Controller and continues to be its guiding force even though he handed over to his son Ankoor Purie. With five facilities across India, it has a national presence. He began the India Today Group with an eponymous magazine in 1975. Today the group is India's most diversified media group with 32 magazines, 7 radio stations, 4 TV channels, 1 newspaper, multiple web and mobile portals, a leading classical music label and book publishing arm.

=== India Today ===
Vidya Vilas Purie, Aroon Purie's father, launched the fortnightly magazine India Today in 1975, with his daughter Madhu Trehan as its editor and Aroon Purie as its publisher. The magazine was born during the Emergency declared by Prime Minister Indira Gandhi. With India Today, Aroon tried to "fill the information gap which exists amongst persons interested in India residing abroad". With editions in five languages, it is the most widely–read publication in India – a position which, as of 2006, it had held for over a decade – with a readership of over 11 million.

He also set the journalistic style for the 24-hour news and current affairs Hindi news channel Aaj Tak and English news channel Headlines Today. In 2025, at the FICCI Frames conference, Purie commented that artificial intelligence poses an “existential threat” to the creation of credible journalism, warning that AI-generated content could erode trust in news media.

== Awards and associations ==
He was conferred the Padma Bhushan in 2001, the third-highest civilian award of the government of India, for his contribution to Indian journalism. He has received other honours, including the B.D. Goenka Award for Excellence in Journalism (1988), 'Journalist of the Year 1990' award by the Indian Federation of Small and Medium Newspapers, the G.K. Reddy Memorial Award for Outstanding Contribution to Journalism (1993–1994), the Hall of Fame Award from the Advertising Club of Kolkata (2002) and the NT Award for Lifetime achievement from www.Indiatelevision.com (2008).

He is associated with several councils, including the Council of Management, Audit Bureau of Circulations (Chairman, 2000–2001). He is on the Executive Committee of The Editors' Guild of India, Council of Management All India Management Association (Special Invitee). He was Chairman of the CII National Committee on Media (2001–2002).

He is currently the chairman of FIPP (Federation of International Periodicals and Publications). Aroon Purie is a board member of the Global Editors Network since its creation in April 2011. In March 2022, he was bestowed with the ABLF lifetime achievement award for his contributions in the field of Journalism.

== Litigation ==
‌In 2007 a criminal defamation case was filed against Aroon Purie over a report titled “Mission Misconduct” published in India Today in April 2007. According to the article, three Indian officials posted in the UK were “recalled in quick succession following serious allegations of sexual misconduct, corruption in issuance of visas and sale of Indian passports to illegal immigrants”.

The Supreme Court quashed the case against Aroon Purie in October 2022 over the article published in 2007 by India today. Though Chief Justice U.U. Lalit, Justice Ravindra Bhat, and Justice Bela M Trivedi quashed the case against Purie; they did not grant relief to the author of the news article.

== Plagiarism ==
A media watchdog, CounterMedia, found the opening two paragraphs—the first 250 words—of Purie's 400-word editorial of 18 October 2010 on the Indian actor Rajnikanth to be identical to those in an article by Grady Hendrix published on 27 September 2010 in Slate, a US-based online magazine.

Purie apologised for the mistake, suggesting that it had resulted from jet lag and claimed that "a couple of sentences lifted from another article were sent to me." In response, Hendrix wrote in Slate: "The jetlag apology wasn't meant to be taken as a serious statement, it was more of an old school attempt to make the problem go away with a silly, 'Whoops, I'm tired!' shrug." Hendrix also wrote that he considered it "a satisfactory closure to the matter."
