= Urmilesh =

Indian Journalist

Urmilesh Yadav
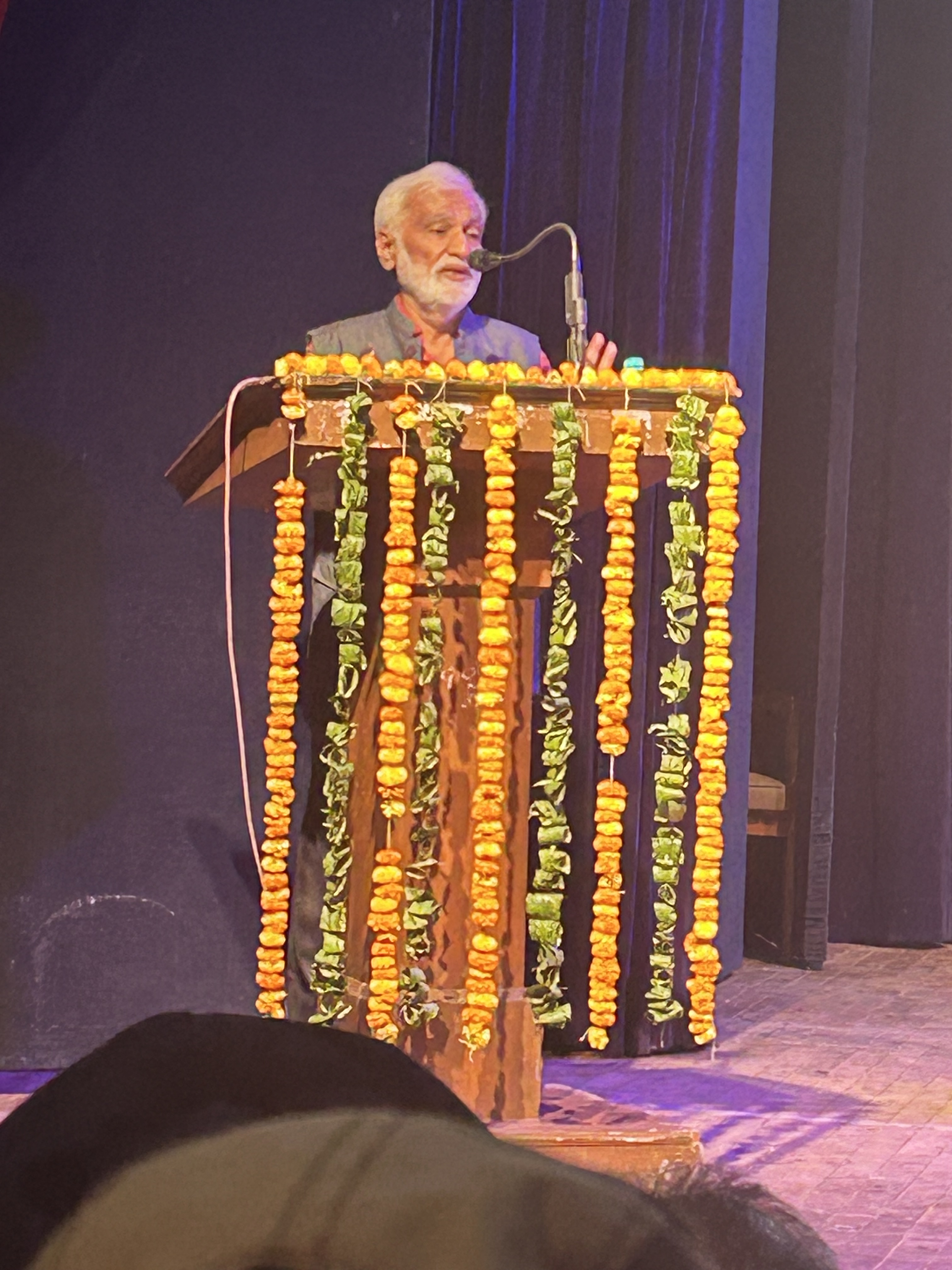
- Education: Jawaharlal Nehru University; Allahabad University
- Occupations: Journalist; Author; Writer
- Notable work: Christiania Meri Jaan, Kashmir - Virasat aur Siyasat (2006), Jharkhand Jadui Zameen Ka Andhera, Bihar ka Sach, Rahul Sankrityayan Srijan Aur Sangharsh, Jhelam Kinare Dahakate Chinar.

Urmilesh is an Indian journalist and author. He was the executive director of Rajya Sabha TV from 2010 to 2012, and has worked in various Hindi publications like Hindustan and Navbharat Times, among others. He also anchored Media Manthan on Rajya Sabha TV, a media-watch programme about the week's news and its coverage in the media.

He is currently (as of July 2020) the 'Reader's Editor' at NewsClick.

Urmilesh completed his M.A. from Allahabad University and received his MPhil from JNU in 1981.

He has written Hindi books like Christiania Meri Jaan, Kashmir - Virasat aur Siyasat (2006), Jharkhand Jadui Zameen Ka Andhera, Bihar ka Sach, Rahul Sankrityayan Srijan Aur Sangharsh, Jhelam Kinare Dahakate Chinar.
