= History TV18 =

Indian pay TV channel

- Logo used since 2022
- Country: India
- Headquarters: Mumbai, Maharashtra, India

Programming
- Languages: English; Telugu; Tamil; Hindi
- Picture format: 1080i HDTV

Ownership
- Owner: A&E Networks (50%); Network18 (50%)

History
- Launched: 30 November 2003; 22 years ago
- Former names: The History Channel

Links
- Website: www.historyindia.com

History TV18 (formerly known as The History Channel) is a television channel, a local version of History Channel in India. It broadcasts infotainment and documentary shows. It is owned by a joint venture between American media group A&E Networks, and Network18 Group, an Indian media group a subsidiary of Reliance Industries. The distribution and broadcasting within the Indian market.

== History ==
History was first launched as The History Channel on 30 November 2003. It was launched by a joint venture between AETN International and News Corporation's Star, through its subsidiary NGC Networks. It had aired series like Boy's Toys, Biography, Conspiracy?, Crusades, Secret Agents and Breaking Vegas and television movies like Marilyn and Me. Following the expiration of the deal between AETN and Star on 21 November 2008, Star took over the channel and re-branded it as Fox History & Entertainment. That channel has since been re-branded again as Fox History & Traveller, then Fox Traveller and Fox Life and was rebranded in India as Star Life and finally it was discontinued on 15 March 2025.

On 9 October 2011, The History Channel was re-launched in India as History TV18, by a joint venture between A&E Networks and Network18 Group.

== Programming ==
=== Original programming ===
- Modern Marvels: Treasures of the Indus
- Vital Stats of India
- OMG! Yeh Hai Mera India
  - OMG! Chhattisgarh
- Taj Mahal History
- Saving the Ganga
- Ansuni Kahani – Shantanu (Untold Story of Shantanu and Cricket)
- Saving the Western Ghats
- Republic Day Line Up
- Lost World of Kamasutra
- India's Deadliest Roads
- India on Four Wheels
- India Showcase
- India 70 Wonders
- Independence Day Special
- History of Sex
- Genius
- Air India 182
- 26/11 Mumbai Terror Attack
- A Brush With Life: Satish Gujral
- Bollywood@100
- A Passage Through India

=== Acquired programming ===
- Tour de Royal with Neel Madhav
- Dynamo: Magician Impossible
- Four Rooms
- In Search of Aliens
- Metropolis
- Serial Killer Earth
- Tamas: India's Partition

=== From History Channel ===
- American Restoration
- Ancient Aliens
- Baggage Battles
- Barbarians Rising
- Biker Battleground Phoenix
- The Bible
- Bonnie & Clyde
- Cajun Pawn Stars
- Counting Cars
- Food Tech
- Forged in Fire
- Houdini
- Hunting Hitler
- Leepu & Pitbull
- Pawn Stars
- Pawn Stars UK
- Pawnography
- Spartan X
- Stan Lee's Superhumans
- Storage Wars

=== Upcoming programs ===
- Crassy Wheels
