= Neel Madhav =

Producer, Director, television personality, Author & Mentalist(born 1993)

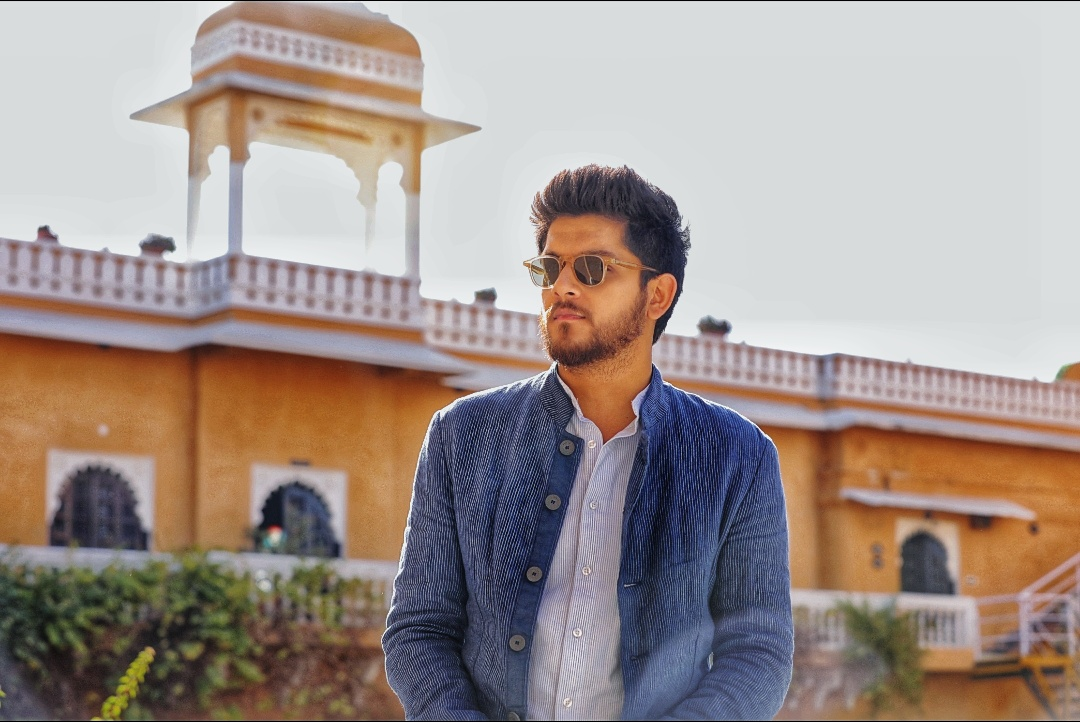
- Born: 14 August 1993 (age 33)
- Education: The Doon School
- Alma mater: H.R. College of Commerce and Economics
- Occupations: Actor; consultant; educator; illusionist; mentalist; television presenter; writer
- Years active: 2013 — present
- Known for: Television work: You've Got Magic with Neel Madhav, Made in Heaven
- Parents: Raghvendra Madhav (father); Vinita Madhav (mother)
- Awards: Forbes Asia 30 Under 30 (2019) (Sports and Entertainment)

Neel Madhav (born 14 August 1993) is a television producer, director, educator, public speaker, television personality, illusionist, mentalist, actor and writer. He is the director of special projects at Fashion TV Paris, where he handles television distribution and programming. He is also the CEO of Nyaas Solutions which is a fashion consultancy & fashion tourism firm.

Madhav hosts the travel and magic television show You Got Magic with Neel Madhav. He was included in the 2019 Forbes Asia Sports and Entertainment 30 under 30. His work incorporates mentalism, neuro-linguistic programming, and criminology. Madhav also specializes in nonverbal communication and body language and provides consultation services for companies.

== Early life and education ==
Madhav was born on 14 August 1993 to Raghvendra Madhav, an investment banker, and Vinita Madhav, a scriptwriter and producer. His family lived in various locations, including New York City, Mumbai and New Delhi.

He attended The Doon School for his secondary education and received a Bachelor of Commerce degree from H.R. College of Commerce and Economics.

Madhav cites magicians James Randi and Jason Randal as inspirations, and David Blaine, Dynamo, and Derren Brown as role models.

== Career ==
Madhav developed You Got Magic with Neel Madhav, which premiered on NDTV Good Times in 2014. The show features a combination of food, travel, adventure, and magic. The show began airing on Sony BBC Earth in March 2020.

His illusions include turning sand into gold, turning leaves into butterflies, making people forget how to read, and predicting newspaper headlines.

Madhav has presented at TEDx conferences at St. Xavier's College, Mumbai and Christ University in Bangalore.

He teaches criminal psychology and neuro-linguistic programming.

In 2016, Madhav co-wrote the book You Got Magic with his mother, Vinita Madhav, published by Penguin Random House.

In 2019, Madhav played a recurring role as Arjun Mehra in the Amazon Original TV series Made in Heaven. He was also included in the Forbes Asia 30 under 30 list for Sports and Entertainment.

== Personal life ==
Madhav resides in Mumbai.

== Filmography ==
Television
Year	Title	Role	Channel
2013 – present	You Got Magic	Host, writer, producer	NDTV Good Times (2013–2019); BBC Earth (2020–)
2019 – present	Made in Heaven	Arjun Mehra	Amazon Prime Video
2021 – present	Tour D' Royale	Host, writer, director, producer	History TV 18
