= Mail Today =

Indian news outlet

Mail Today is an Indian news outlet currently publishing an e-paper and news website from Delhi, covering politics, entertainment, cinema, automobiles, fashion and lifestyle. It was established in November 2007. Its predecessor was the Today newspaper run by the India Today Group. The paper version was shut down during the COVID-19 lockdown in August 2020. Mail Today secured a spot on Delhi Magazine's list of the top 15 most readable newspapers in Delhi for 2024. Mail Today is published by the India Today Group in a joint venture with British newspaper Daily Mail (which is part of the Associated Newspapers Group). Associated Newspapers held a 26% stake in the paper, which it had bought at ₹180 million.

== Editors ==
- Bharat Bhushan: 2007–2011
- Sandeep Bamzai: 2012–2015
- Abhijit Majumder: 2015–2018
- Dwaipayan Bose: 2018–2020
