= Today (Indian newspaper) =

Defunct Indian newspaper

Today is a defunct afternoon newspaper from the India Today Group, founded on 29 April 2002. It was replaced by a newspaper called Mail Today, which is published by a joint venture with Daily Mail (part of the Associated Newspapers group).
