= Dhanya Rajendran =

Indian journalist

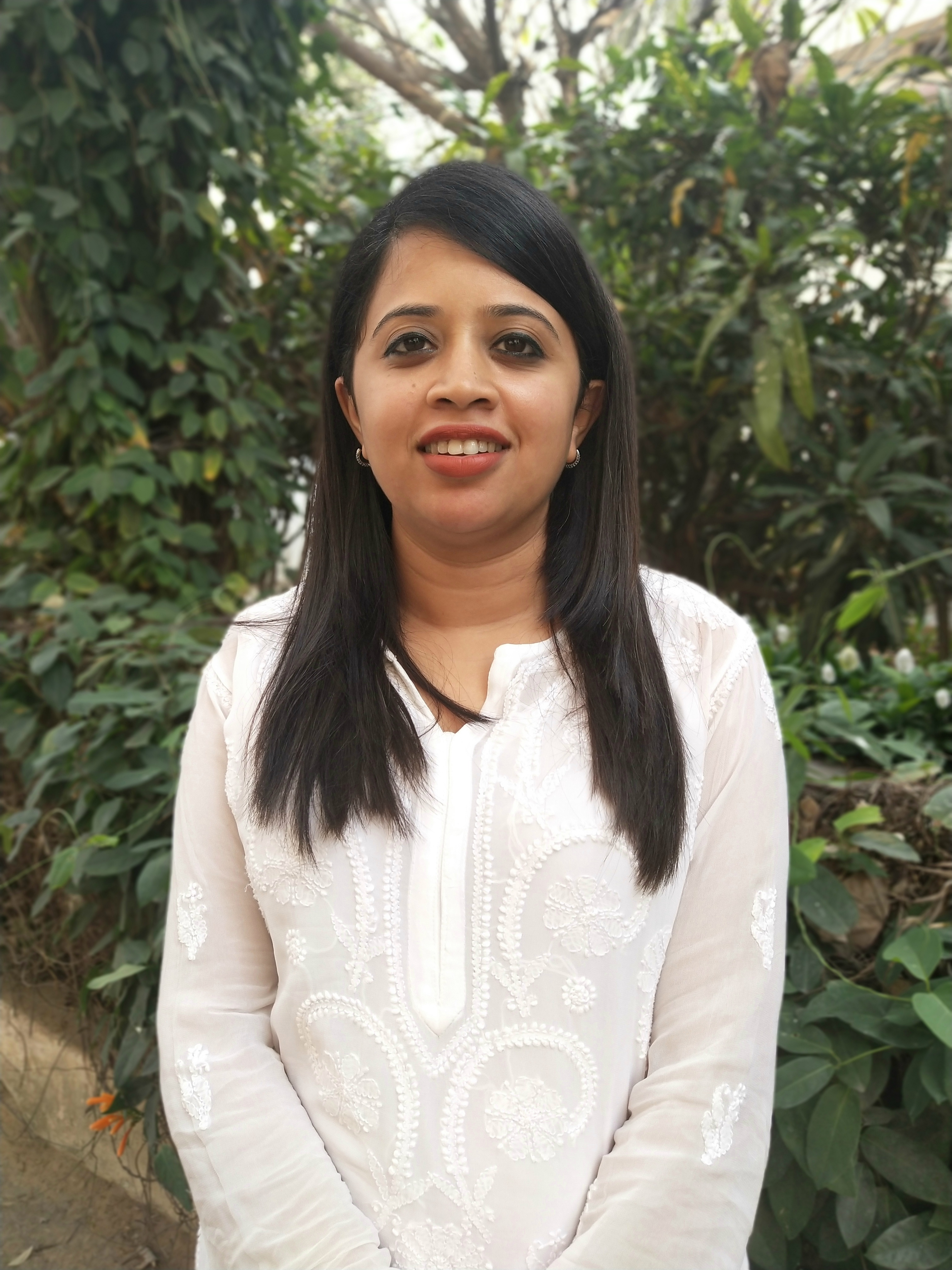
- Dhanya Rajendran at the 15th annual meeting of the Network of Women in Media in Bangalore, February 2020
- Occupation: Journalist

Dhanya Rajendran is an Indian journalist and the co-founder and editor-in-chief of The News Minute. She previously worked with Times Now and The New Indian Express.

== Early life and education ==
Dhanya Rajendran was born and grew up in Palakkad, Kerala. She was educated at Kanikkamatha Convent School and Government Victoria College. She is an alumnus of the Asian College of Journalism in Chennai.

== Career ==
Dhanya Rajendran started her career by working for Kerala's first 24-hour news channel India Vision in 2003. In 2004, she moved to New Indian Express in Chennai. She subsequently moved to working for Times Now as a reporter in 2005 and went on to become its bureau chief of South India. Along with her husband Vignesh Vellore and Chitra Subramaniam, she co-founded The News Minute, a digital news website focussing on the news coverage of the southern states of India, in 2014. Rajendran is also a member of the Network for Women in Media, India.

Rajendran has said that while she always wanted to be on television, it was the coverage of the fall of the Deve Gowda government by Barkha Dutt and Rajdeep Sardesai, where they were angry on the behalf of the Indian people, that inspired her to pursue journalism. She said media struck her as a space where she could speak up for other people.

=== Online harassment and misogyny ===
Dhanya Rajendran has often faced online harassment on account of her work. In 2017, she faced abuse on Twitter for expressing an opinion about Sura, a 2010 Tamil film she did not like. Her opinion about the film, which stars popular actor Vijay, angered his fans. Rajendran's phone crashed after it could not handle close to 31,000 tweets spread across a couple of minutes. #PublicityBeepDhany—a hashtag was created to abuse Rajendran—started trending, and abuses laden with sexual harassment followed.

Rajendran filed a complaint with the cyber crime branch of the Chennai police. In response, an FIR was filed under IPC sections 354 D (stalking), 506(1) (criminal intimidation), 507 (criminal intimidation by an anonymous communication), 509 (insulting the modesty of women), section 67 of the IT Act (publishing obscene material), section 4 of the TN Prohibition of Harassment of Women Act, and section 6 of the Indecent Representation of Women Act.

M. K. Stalin, the leader of the Dravida Munnetra Kazhagam, also an issued a statement against the misogynistic threats. Despite Rajendran deleting the original tweet, the harassment continued. The Network for Women in Media and International Federation of Journalists issued statements in support of Rajendran and condemned the online harassment faced. Finally Vijay issued a statement asking his fans to stop the online harassment against Rajendran.

The Chennai police investigated Ramkumar, one of the accused, a Vijay fan and a Tamil Nadu resident, in connection with the online harassment. He apologised for his actions after the police met his mother and after the denial of his bail by the Madras High Court.

When she reported about godman Swami Nityananda being accused of sexual abuse, she faced sexualized harassment on social media from the followers of Nithyananda's cult. In response to her reportage, the followers made several news videos calling her abusive names including presstitute and anti-national among others.

Dhanya Rajendran has been vocal about online harassment faced by women journalists on the field. Immediately after former chief minister of Tamil Nadu J Jayalalitha's death, Rajendran wrote a piece about how she was molested by one of her security men when she was out to do stories around election coverage. She reacted strongly against the harassment faced by women journalists reporting about the entry of women to Sabarimala Temple. In 2019, she issued a statement in support of women journalists protesting against harassment by the secretary of the Thiruvananthapuram Press Club against a woman journalist. She has also come out in support of women sharing their stories during the MeToo movement in India, featuring stories about the issue.

Dhanya Rajendran has also come out against sensationalism in news media by reflecting upon her own experiences as a journalist and the pressures that compel journalists to resort to digging out voyeuristic information in cases related to sexual abuse. She has said that journalists should exercise restraint and should not publish graphic details of a sexual crime.

== Awards and accolades ==
Dhanya Rajendran was named as one of India's best entrepreneurs in Fortune magazine's 40 under 40 list in 2018. Rajendran was also awarded Namma Bengaluru Foundation's media person of the year in 2017.
