= NewsClick =

News organisation in India

- Founded: 2009; 17 years ago
- Founder: Prabir Purkayastha
- Type: Digital media
- Legal status: Company
- Headquarters: Delhi, India
- Location: India
- Official language: English, Marathi, Hindi
- Owner: PPK NEWSCLICK Studio Private Limited
- Affiliations: DIGIPUB
- Website: www.newsclick.in

NewsClick is an Indian news website founded by Prabir Purkayastha in 2009, who also serves as the Editor-in-Chief. The main headquarters are situated in New Delhi, with an additional office branch in Mumbai, Maharashtra.

== History and ownership ==
NewsClick, an independent media organization, describes its mission as being "dedicated to covering news from India and beyond, with a particular focus on progressive movements." The organization was founded by Prabir Purkayastha, who also served as its Editor-in-Chief.

NewsClick is owned by PPK NewsClick Studio Private Limited.

Prabir Purkayastha and Subodh Varma serve as the directors of PPK NewsClick Studio Private Limited.

== Government pressure ==
NewsClick has consistently reported on issues such as paper leak protests, protests by farmers and attacks on minorities. Satarupa Chakraborty, writing for The Wire, notes that NewsClick is a frequent target of Indian government officials because it "has built its credibility by recording the voices of unheard."

=== August 2020 ===
In August 2020, an FIR was filed against NewsClick under IPC Sections 406, 420, and 120B. The allegation was that the company had received foreign direct investment (FDI) totaling Rs 9.59 crore from Worldwide Media Holdings LLC, based in the US, during the fiscal year 2018-19. The complaint claimed that this investment was made by significantly inflating the valuation of the company's shares, ostensibly to evade the prescribed 26% cap on FDI in a digital news website.

=== February 2021 ===
On February 9, 2021, the Enforcement Directorate (ED) carried out searches at multiple premises connected to Newsclick, its promoters, and other individuals as part of an investigation into money laundering. The searches encompassed approximately eight locations, including those associated with Newsclick and its promoters in South Delhi's Saidulajab, Gurgaon, and other areas. These operations were conducted under the provisions of the Prevention of Money Laundering Act, 2002 (PMLA). The Enforcement Directorate's involvement in this case began after the registration of a FIR by the Delhi Police.

=== China case ===
On 24 August 2023, the Delhi High Court took notice of an application filed by the city police, directing NewsClick's founder, Prabir Purkayastha, to respond to their request to vacate a previous interim order from 2021. This previous order had granted Purkayastha interim protection from arrest in connection with a case involving alleged unlawful foreign funding. Additionally, the high court's decision in 2021 had required him to cooperate with the ongoing investigation. This development is part of the ongoing legal proceedings related to Purkayastha's plea for anticipatory bail in the same case.

In August 2023, the Enforcement Directorate took action against NewsClick, alleging its involvement in promoting pro-China propaganda, as well as money laundering. This is a first case where ED claims to uncover China-media link.

==== Raid by the Delhi Police ====
On 3 October 2023, the Delhi Police reportedly conducted raids at more than thirty locations, including the residences of several journalists associated with NewsClick. The locations included the residences of NewsClick Editor Prabir Purkayastha, video journalist Abhisar Sharma, political commentator and senior journalist Aunindyo Chakravarty, veteran journalist Paranjoy Guha Thakurta, Bhasha Singh, Bappa Sinha, and Urmilesh. These raids were conducted in connection with a probe into the funding of the news portal NewsClick. The Delhi Police Special Cell registered a case against NewsClick under the stringent Unlawful Activities (Prevention) Act (UAPA).

The residences of former and current NewsClick journalists, contributors, and employees were part of the raids and several individuals including journalists were reportedly detained for questioning. The raid extended to NewsClick's premises. These events were part of a larger controversy stemming from allegations made in August 2023, following an investigation by The New York Times, which claimed that NewsClick was funded by Neville Roy Singham, a U.S. based tech mogul for promoting Chinese propaganda.

NewsClick denied these allegations, asserting its independence as a news organization. The matter remains under investigation, sparking a debate around press freedom and the use of stringent laws in such cases.

=== Court ruling ===
In May 2024, the Supreme Court ordered Prabir Purkayastha's release from the custody declaring his arrest invalid as the Delhi Police didn't provide grounds for arrest in writing to his lawyer.

==== Reaction and responses ====
On 3 October 2023, the Press Club of India criticized the police action against individuals associated with the NewsClick portal, asserting that it posed a threat to press freedom. The Club called upon the government to disclose the specifics of the matter and conducted a spontaneous protest meeting in solidarity with the affected journalists, resolving to continue supporting media freedom.

On the same day, the Executive Committee of Editors Guild of India (EGI) expressed concern regarding the raids conducted at the residences of senior journalists, highlighting the seizure of their electronic devices and their detention for questioning by Delhi police. The EGI acknowledged the importance of upholding the law when actual offenses are involved but emphasized the necessity of adhering to due process and avoiding an atmosphere of intimidation under stringent laws, safeguarding freedom of expression and dissent in a functioning democracy.

The National Alliance of Journalists, Delhi Union of Journalists, and the Kerala Union of Working Journalists (Delhi Unit) collectively condemned the police raids on 3 October 2023. They said that the targeting of media personnel and the unprecedented nature of these actions, emphasizing that the government's alleged objective was to suppress press freedom, particularly following NewsClick's coverage of labor and agricultural issues. They called for an immediate halt to this perceived attack on press freedom and urged the media fraternity to rally against government-led intimidation.

DIGIPUB, in its statement on 3 October 2023, strongly criticised the coordinated police actions against news professionals and commentators, asserting that these actions violated due process and fundamental rights. DIGIPUB characterized the government's behavior as arbitrary and intimidatory, marking a concerning escalation of tactics against the media. Prabir Purkayastha, Editor-in-Chief of NewsClick, is the vice-chairperson of DIGIPUB.

The opposition parties, those belonging to the Indian National Developmental Inclusive Alliance (I.N.D.I.A), strongly condemned the Bharatiya Janata Party (BJP) government's actions targeting the media. They asserted that the BJP government persistently undermined press freedom over the past nine years, utilizing investigative agencies to suppress various media outlets, including the British Broadcasting Corporation, Newslaundry, Dainik Bhaskar, Bharat Samachar, the Kashmir Walla, and The Wire, among others. I.N.D.I.A also highlighted the government's alleged attempts to convert media organizations into instruments for its partisan and ideological interests by facilitating their takeover by crony capitalists. Additionally, I.N.D.I.A criticised the government for resorting to reprisals against individual journalists who have dared to speak truth to power. They pointed out that regressive policies like the Information Technology Rules 2021 had constrained the media's ability to report objectively, ultimately impacting India's global reputation as a mature democracy. I.N.D.I.A contended that the BJP government's coercive actions predominantly target media entities and journalists that hold those in power accountable while urging the government to address genuine national concerns instead of diverting attention through attacks on the media.

== See also ==
- Tek Fog
- Godi media
