= Surendra Pratap Singh =

Indian journalist (1948–1997)

Surendra Pratap Singh, also referred to as S.P. Singh (4 December 1948 in Ghazipur – 27 June 1997), was a leader among Hindi-language journalists. He was a founder and editor of an influential Hindi-language weekly newspaper Ravivar in the 1970s and 1980s, and, in the 1990s, he was the founder and anchor of the Hindi-language news bulletin Aaj Tak, which first appeared on public television before it became an independent, Hindi-language television news channel.

== Career ==
Singh served as an investigative journalist for the newspaper at work, under editor MJ Akbar.

Journalists such as Surendra Pratap Singh credit S.P. Singh's success for sparking their interest in Hindi-language journalism and launching their careers.

== Death ==
Singh died from a heart attack (or, in some sources, brain haemorrhage).

== Awards ==
For his contributions, the Institute for Research and Documentation in Social Sciences (IRDS), which is a non-governmental organization from Lucknow, established the S. P. Singh Award for Electronic Media.
