= Highway on My Plate =

- Genre: Food travelogue
- Created by: Monica Narula
- Directed by: Abhinandan Sekhri
- Presented by: Rocky Singh, Mayur Sharma
- Country of origin: India
- Original language: English

Production
- Executive producer: Monica Narula
- Producer: Prashant Sareen
- Running time: 22 min

Original release
- Network: NDTV Good Times
- Release: 2007 – present

Highway on My Plate (HOMP) was a weekly travel and food show that aired on NDTV Good Times between 2007 and 2013, and is now available on Amazon Prime Video or repeated on channels. It was anchored by food enthusiasts and childhood friends Rocky Singh and Mayur Sharma, who have together traveled more than 1,20,000 kilometres across the length and breadth of India over the course of seven years in search of memorable eating experiences. The show was based on NDTV Good Times' Head of Food Programming Monica Narula's idea to showcase India's unique highway food and was directed by Abhinandan Sekhri and produced by Prashant Sareen, both of whom later co-founded the news critique website Newslaundry. In November, 2013, Rocky Singh announced on Facebook that HOMP Hills was the last season and there will be no new episodes.

Over the years the show has garnered quite a fan following due to the natural chemistry and camaraderie between the two hosts as well as their 'will-eat-anything' attitude and genuine love for different sorts of food and their over-the-top and quirky sense of humour. The show won the 'Best Travel Show' at the Indian Telly Awards, 2008. In 2011 the hosts came out with a book titled Highway on My Plate: The Indian Guide to Roadside Eating which has been honoured at the Gourmand World Cookbook Awards 2011 as the Best Celebrity Cook Book.

== About the show ==
The show follows a regular format where the hosts (or "The Highwaymen", as they are affectionately referred to on their television website) travel to different food joints and eateries across the different states of India, mainly through the National Highways of India. The hosts show equal enthusiasm while visiting different eateries irrespective of their decor and ambience and are equally comfortable in road side dhabas and food stalls to family restaurants and five star hotels. Recently the hosts have started inviting suggestions from their fans about famous eating places which they might have missed out and cover these places as well as sharing a meal with fans who respond with suggestions. The hosts describe the food in great detail and never fail to notice and point out the little details that add character to the eatery. A unique feature of the show is its system of grading a restaurant on a scale of ten on different parameters such as food, service, ambience and sum up the above with a "value for money" rank also on a scale of ten. Restaurants that impress them are rewarded with customised menus and coasters. Mayur being a vegetarian often ends up getting a raw deal in restaurants specialising in non-vegetarian food, much to the amusement of co-host Rocky. Also unique is the "food-quote", a rhyming non-sensical limerick delivered by the hosts summing up their experiences of that particular episode. The show makes an effort to feature the traditional foods as well as the specialties of a particular place. Thus we get to check out Punjab's legendary Kesar Da Dhaba famous for its parathas and kaali dal, the kachoris (called kachoras) from chawani Lal Halwai in Rajasthan, the unique pootharekulu in Vijayawada or the kadam pickle served at Chaurasiya Dhaba, Khundra or the huge variety of chaat at Narayan Chaat Bhandar, Jhansi in Uttar Pradesh.

The Season 9, which aired in 2011, starting 14 August in Meerut, had the show visiting places recommended by the viewers, later around Christmas the show travelled to Shillong.

== HOMP Adda ==
The latest season of the show takes the Highwaymen to different canteens and dining halls of educational institutions across India is appropriately named 'Adda', meaning an informal gathering or hangout of friends. Rocky Singh and Mayur Sharma visit various institutions over the course of the show. Among the institutions they visit Mumbai's H.R. College of Commerce and Economics, Jai Hind College, Delhi's Shri Ram College of Commerce, Hindu College, University of Delhi, Doon School, Welham Girls & Boys School, St. George's College, Mussoorie and The Lawrence School, Sanawar are noteworthy. They have recently been to IIM Calcutta and the Presidency College, Kolkata.

== About the hosts ==
Both Rocky Singh and Mayur Sharma hail from a military background. Rocky has held a number of jobs in the past, ranging from managing a gas distributorship to working with British Airways. He is also a wild-life enthusiast and among his passions are scuba diving, ornithology, golf and above all his food. Mayur has travelled and hitch-hiked his way across sixty five countries and is passionate about squash and rock-climbing. He now specializes in out-of-the-classroom education and assists children as well as corporates in developing inter-personal relationships and improving the productivity of group dynamics. The duo has also hosted two other shows on the channel NDTV Good Times, India's Most Haunted and Jai Hind with Rocky and Mayur.
