= Tehelka as Metaphor =

2009 book by Madhu Trehan

Prism Me a Lie, Tell me a Truth:Tehelka as Metaphor
- Author: Madhu Trehan
- Language: English
- Genre: Investigative journalism
- Publisher: Roli Books
- Publication date: January 18, 2009
- Publication place: India
- Pages: 587
- ISBN: 978-81-7436-580-4

Tehelka as Metaphor is a 2009 nonfiction book by Indian journalist, Madhu Trehan. The book is an account of the Tehelka exposé and its aftermath, Operation West End. In 2001, a sting operation and an undercover news story exposed the bribery and corruption prevalent in the Army and the then Indian government.

== Contents ==
Prism Me a Lie Tell Me a Truth: Tehelka as Metaphor is an account of the aftermath of Operation West End. The story's heroes, villains and victims have been analyzed and author Madhu Trehan writes about the beginning of it. She writes about how the government got back at Tehelka through unfair means. The people involved in the sting operation are interviewed in the book and it provides a take on modern journalism. Trehan talks about a "ray of hope", she asks whether (it) will actually "bring about a change in this highly cynical, jaded, Machiavellian society."

== Reviews ==
Released in February, 2009, Tehelka as Metaphor got a good reception. The Hindustan Times said, "Madhu Trehan delved into the old story of Tehelka and came up with a new tale of contemporary India. Trehan's narrative brings out complex human encounters on the Tehelka tapes." The Tribune said in its review of the book, "It is a book that matters and will stand the test of time." Columnist, Tavleen Singh, wrote, "Trehan has used Tehelka as the prism of corruption and shown a justice system unable to deal with it." Elle said, "The book lurches with equal comfort between Kurosawa, Virginia Woolf and The Matrix in its frame of reference, and continually finds itself asking perhaps unanswerably large questions about integrity and the nature of truth." The Indian Express said, "The book is a post-mortem in easy language and also an insight into and guide to modern journalism".

Her book courted controversy when renowned fellow journalist Karan Thapar down-reviewed her book in the section Sunday sentiments of Hindustan times titled 'Truly sorry, Madhu'. In an unprecedented approach, she replied to the review in the same newspaper by an article 'Who's afraid of Karan Thapar?' describing the review as personal and motivated. Their rivalry continued on Trehan's show 'Can you take it', where she lambasted Thapar for his antagonistic style of interview.
