= Good News Today =

Indian Hindi-language reality show channel

- Country: India
- Broadcast area: India
- Network: TV Today Network
- Headquarters: Noida, India

Programming
- Language: Hindi
- Picture format: 4:3 (576i SDTV)

Ownership
- Owner: Living Media
- Key people: Aroon Purie (CMD)
- Sister channels: Aaj Tak; India Today; Dilli Aaj Tak

History
- Launched: 22 August 2005

Links
- Website: gnttv.com

Availability

Terrestrial
- DD Free Dish: LCN 13

Streaming media
- GNT TV Live

Good News Today (GNT; formerly Aajtak Tez) is a 24-hour Hindi-language television news channel owned by the TV Today Network, and a sister channel of Aaj Tak. It ran as Aajtak Tez between 22 August 2005 and 4 September 2021 and was renamed to Good News Today on 5 September 2021.

== See also ==
- List of television stations in India
