= India Today (TV channel) =

Indian English news channel

- Country: India
- Broadcast area: India; Worldwide
- Headquarters: Noida, Uttar Pradesh, India

Programming
- Language: English
- Picture format: 16:9 (1080i, HDTV)

Ownership
- Owner: Living Media
- Key people: Sanjay Sharma (Deputy Editor)
- Sister channels: Aaj Tak; Good News Today; Dilli Aaj Tak

History
- Launched: 2003; 23 years ago
- Former names: Headlines Today

Links
- Website: indiatoday.in

Availability

Streaming media
- India Today Live: Watch Live

India Today is a 24-hour English language television news channel based in Noida, Uttar Pradesh that carries news, current affairs and business programming in India. The channel is owned by TV Today Network Ltd, which is a part of Living Media.

== History ==
The channel was launched in 2003 as a sister channel of the Hindi Aaj Tak news channel. It is one of the four news channels from the TV Today Network stable, the others being Aaj Tak, Aajtak Tez and Delhi Aaj Tak. Alok Verma was brought in as the Executive Producer to successfully launch TV Today group's foray into the English news channel category. It aired and produced the animated political cartoon "So Sorry"; each episode satirises recent events in the news featuring extremely dramatised versions of said events and hyper-caricaturized versions of political figures including Prime Minister of India Narendra Modi, CCP General Secretary Xi Jinping and President of the United States Joe Biden. In September 2015, media watchers flagged the channel for unethical use of footage and sexist content.

In March 2018, Aaj Tak misreported that the Delhi High Court had disqualified 20 MLAs of the Aam Aadmi Party. India Today was among several news channels that also reported the said claim.

In October 2020, India Today was named in an FIR filed by Mumbai police in relation to a Fake TRP Ratings Scandal. India Today was fined ₹5 lakh by Broadcast Audience Research Council (BARC) for manipulating viewership. India Today admitted to being fined for viewership malpractice. Bombay High Court directed TV Today Network to pay the fine imposed by BARC.

== Associated journalists ==
- Rajdeep Sardesai - Consulting Editor
- Gaurav C Sawant - Executive Editor
- Preeti Choudhry - Executive Editor
- Mariya Shakil, Managing Editor

== Awards ==
India Today and its sister channel Aaj Tak has won numerous awards over the years at the Indian Television Academy (ITA) Awards, and the Exchange4media News Broadcasting (ENBA) Awards.

== See also ==
- India Today
