= Burj Littan =

Village in Punjab, India

Burj Littan is a small farming village in the Northern Indian state of Punjab.

== Demographics ==
This village is predominantly occupied by Sikh people, along with several Gurdwaras. Burj Littan has 9 Gurudwara Sahib.

== Culture ==
Within the community of Burj Littan, many individuals partake in kabaddi, Punjab's national game. Excellent kabaddi players came from Burj Littan; the majority of which are now students in Canada.
