= Smita Sharma =

Indian photojournalist and documentary photographer

Smita Sharma is an Indian photojournalist based in Delhi whose work focuses on documenting human rights abuses and gender violence in the Global South, particularly human trafficking and sex trafficking. Her work has been featured in Human Rights Watch, Time, National Geographic Magazine, WSJ, the New York Times, Die Zeit, and other publications and she regularly speaks on gender crimes victim advocacy, social justice issues in South Asia, and ethical photojournalism. Sharma is an International Women's Media Foundation reporting Fellow, a TED Fellow, and has had her work exhibited in the UN Headquarters in New York.

Sharma's 2018 short video project Rebels With a Cause, documenting an all-female Jaipur Police squad that patrols the city on motorbikes to combat violence and harassment against women, was commissioned by Elle UK. Sharma shared, with Louise Donovan, the One World Media Award in the popular features award category in 2019 for Rebels With a Cause.

Together with Yudhijit Bhattacharjee, Sharma created Stolen Lives, for which Sharma shared second prize in the outstanding investigative reporting category in the 2021 Fetisov Journalism Awards, and won the 2021 Amnesty Media Award in the photojournalism category.

In 2022, she published the photobook We Cry in Silence, which covers her investigative photojournalism on the cross-border sex trafficking of underage girls in India and Bangladesh, as well as a focus on trafficking for domestic servitude purposes. The book received the 2023 Lucie Photo Book Prize in the Independent Category and an Award of Excellence at Pictures of the Year (POY) International.
