= Presstitute =

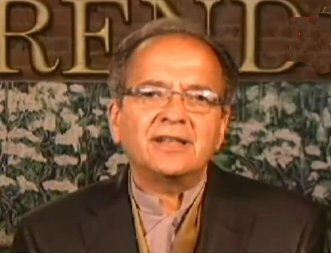
Gerald Celente who coined the term presstitute

Presstitute is a term that references journalists and 'talking heads' in mainstream media who give biased and predetermined views misleadingly tailored to fit a particular partisan, financial or business agenda, thus neglecting the fundamental duty to report news impartially. Coined by American researcher Gerald Celente, the word is a portmanteau of press and prostitute.

The term became popular in the social media after General Vijay Kumar Singh, the former Chief of Army Staff and Indian Union Minister of State for External Affairs, began referring to a section of the media as "presstitutes" in his tweets in 2015.

In July 2023, the UK's Rami Ranger, Baron Ranger had called Indian journalist Poonam Joshi a "presstitute", as well as a "total nutcase" and the "epitome of filth and garbage".

== See also ==
- Churnalism
- Fake news
- Lying press
- Media bias
- Yellow journalism
