= Abhisar Sharma =

Indian journalist

Abhisar Sharma is an Indian journalist and YouTuber. In 2008, he was awarded with Ramnath Goenka Excellence in Journalism Awards. The BBC described him as a "prominent video journalist known for his critical views of the government".

== Career ==
In 2018, while reporting for the ABP News, he justapoxed two crimes in Uttar Pradesh on the day when Narendra Modi was campaigning in the state and hailing the Yogi government for improving the law and order. He was then asked by the ABP news to go off-air, before he resigned after a long leave.

Sharma was among the journalists whose home was searched in October 2023, over the government's investigation against the outlet NewsClick.
