= Food Tech =

- Starring: Bobby Bognar
- Country of origin: United States
- No. of seasons: 1
- No. of episodes: 10

Production
- Running time: approx. 45 min. (without commercial)

Original release
- Network: History Channel
- Release: January 21 – April 1, 2010

Food Tech is a television series on the History Channel about industrial food production. Its host, Bobby Bognar, traveled to farms and factories across the United States to show audiences the various stages of production of meat, produce, packaging materials, and popular end-market products such as Wonder Bread and Drumsticks. Each episode focused a theme such as Mexican food, breakfast, or hotel buffets.

== Episodes ==
No.	Title	Original release date
1	"Cheeseburger and fries"	January 21, 2010
Hamburger meat, buns, ketchup, pickles, sliced cheese, lettuce, tomatoes, onions and French fries.
2	"Chinese take-out"	January 28, 2010
Fortune cookies, takeout boxes, eggrolls, Peking duck, beef & broccoli, oyster sauce and soy sauce.
3	"Lunch box"	February 4, 2010
Wonder Bread, baby carrots, apple juice, juice cartons, Goldfish crackers, peanut butter, Jelly and Twinkies.
4	"Mexican"	February 11, 2010
Tequila, refried beans, chocolate drinks, guacamole, molcajete and tortillas.
5	"Southern fried"	February 18, 2010
Catfish, alligator, Tabasco sauce, rice, okra, cottonseed oil and peaches.
6	"Breakfast"	March 4, 2010
Baking soda, buttermilk, bacon, sausage orange juice and maple syrup.
7	"Italian dinner"	March 11, 2010
Clams, pasta, pine nuts, artichokes, balsamic vinegar, gelato and espresso.
8	"Buffet"	March 18, 2010
Shrimp, horseradish sauce, honey, spinach and sugar.
9	"Pizza"	March 25, 2010
Mozzarella, salami, mushrooms, olives, brick oven and pizza.
10	"Ballpark"	April 1, 2010
Keg, hops, beer, hot dogs, sausage casing, Mustard, Cracker Jack and Drumsticks
