= India Today =

Indian news magazine

- 50th anniversary issue of India Today
- Editor-in-chief: Aroon Purie; Madhu Trehan (founding editor)
- Categories: News magazine
- Circulation: 1,600,000
- Publisher: Living Media India Limited
- Founder: Vidya Vilas Purie
- First issue: 1–15 December 1975
- Company: Living Media
- Country: India
- Based in: Noida, Uttar Pradesh
- Language: English, Hindi
- Website: indiatoday.in
- ISSN: 0254-8399

India Today is a weekly Indian English-language news magazine published by Living Media India Limited. It is the most widely circulated magazine in India, with a readership of close to 8 million. In 2014, India Today launched a new online opinion-oriented site called the DailyO.

As per the Indian Readership Survey 2019, the India Today magazine's English edition had a readership of 9.24 million and the Hindi edition 7.02 million, making them among the most read magazines in India. As of 2026, India Today has published 2,006 issues.

== History ==
India Today was established in 1975 by Vidya Vilas Purie (owner of Thompson Press), with his daughter Madhu Trehan as its editor and his son Aroon Purie as its publisher. Trehan later returned to the United States, after which editorial leadership passed to other editors as the magazine continued to expand its coverage.

The magazine began with a circulation of about 5,000 copies and grew to 15,000 by the end of the Emergency in January 1977. Its circulation increased to around 50,000 by March 1977 and crossed 100,000 by December 1978.

The magazine was originally launched as a news-focused publication and later broadened its scope to include reporting and analysis across politics, business and public affairs. Over time, the magazine became the India Today Group's flagship print title. In addition to its English edition, the magazine was also published in several Indian languages including Hindi, Tamil, Telugu and Malayalam.

The magazine is credited with introducing scientific election polling (psephology) to Indian media through its collaboration with Prannoy Roy and David Butler in the 1980s. In June 1997, to keep pace with the accelerating news cycle after economic liberalization, the publication transitioned from a fortnightly to a weekly format.

In 1982, India Today launched an international edition, which was well received and circulated in 104 countries. During the late 1980s, India Today was first Indian news organisation sending staff reporters to cover global events firsthand, including the Tiananmen Square protests, Afghan War and the collapse of the Soviet Union.

In October 2017, Aroon Purie handed over operational control of the India Today Group to his daughter Kallie Purie, who became vice-chairperson.

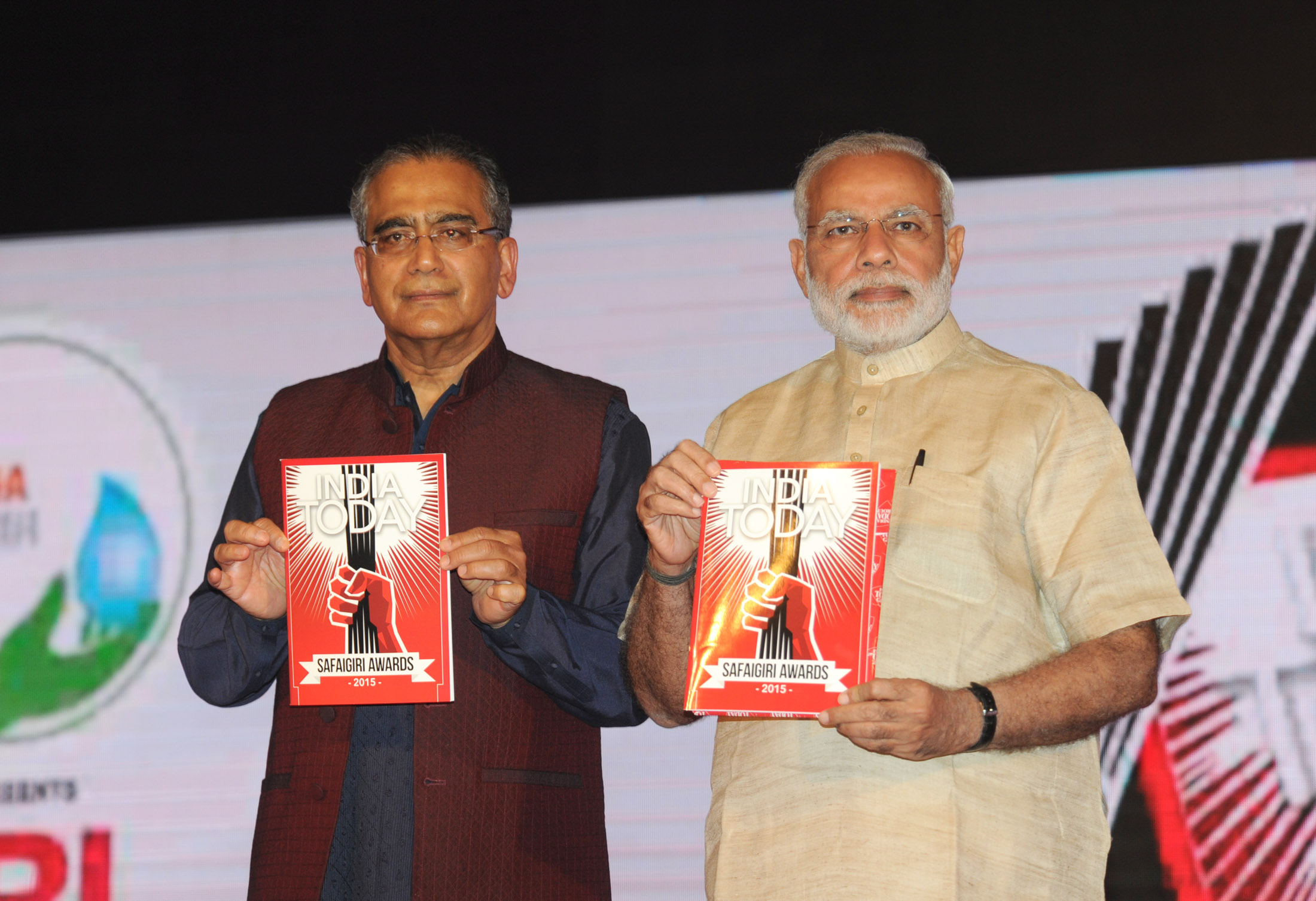
Prime Minister Narendra Modi releasing a special India Today Safaigiri booklet in 2015

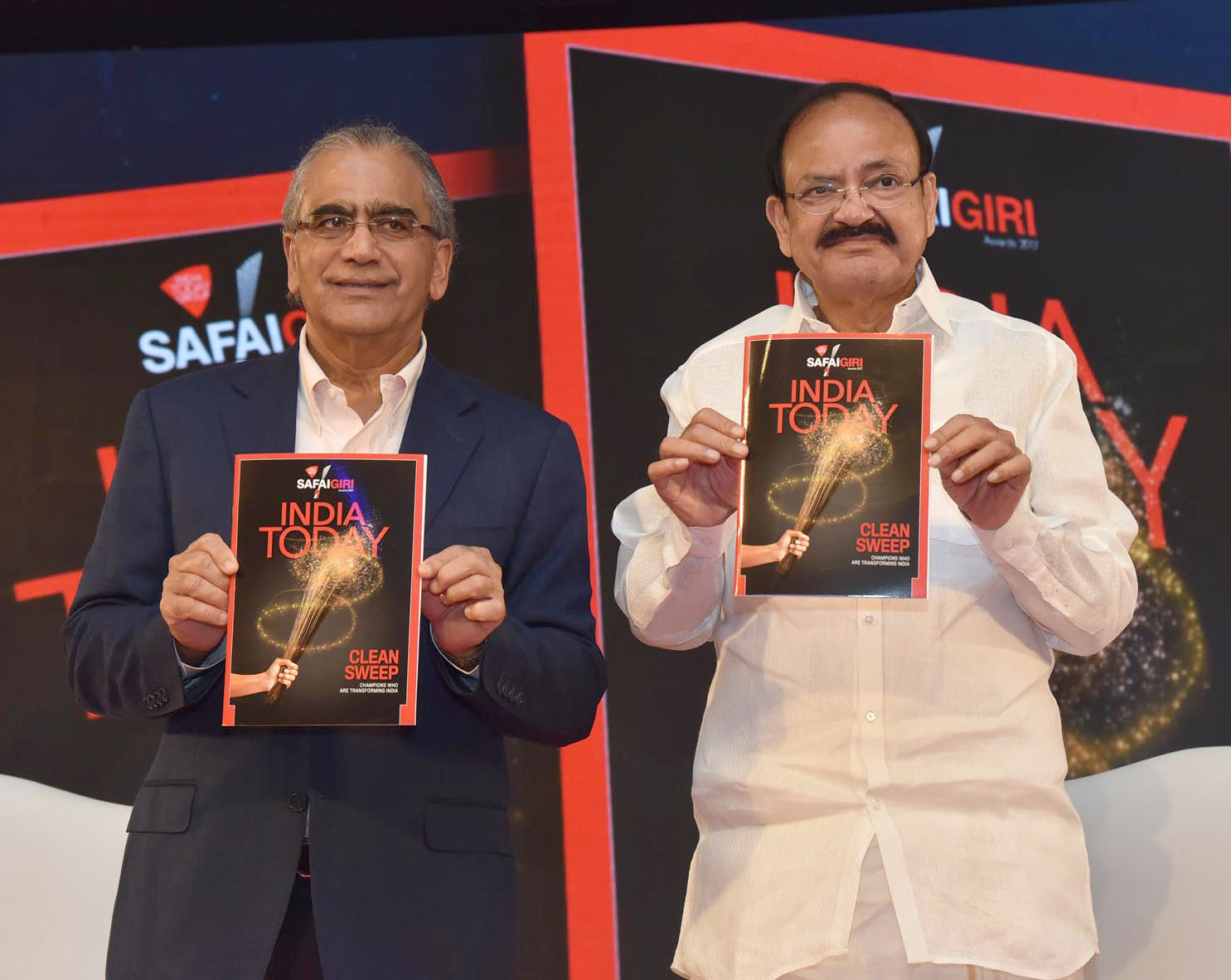
Vice President of India, M. Venkaiah Naidu releasing a special edition of India Today in New Delhi, 2017

In December 2021, the magazine reported an increase in circulation following changes in distribution during and after the COVID-19 lockdowns. In March 2024, Gulf News partnered with India Today magazine to distribute the magazine in the Middle East, extending its availability among readers in the United Arab Emirates.

In January 2026, the magazine marked its 50th anniversary with a 600-page commemorative double issue titled The Remaking of India: 1975–2025. The issue was the largest in the publication's history, documenting five decades of Indian political, economic, and cultural history.

In February 2026, U.S. President Donald Trump shared the cover of India Today’s Newsmakers of the Year 2025 edition featuring himself and Indian PM Narendra Modi on Truth Social, amid renewed diplomatic engagement between India and the United States.

The magazine is published by Living Media India Limited, which is jointly controlled by the Purie family and IGH Holdings, an investment company associated with the Aditya Birla Group.

India Today conducts an annual civic behaviour survey titled Gross Domestic Behavior (GDB), which measures social and civic indicators across Indian states. It was launched in 2025. The survey evaluates Indian states on parameters such as civic sense, public safety, gender equality and diversity. It publishes an overall ranking of states as well as rankings for each parameter.

== Circulation and readership ==
According to the Indian Readership Survey 2019 Q3, the English edition of India Today had a total readership of 9.24 million, while the Hindi edition recorded 7.02 million, making them the two most-read magazines in India.

In the Indian Readership Survey 2017, India Today and India Today Hindi were ranked first and second respectively among all magazines in the country, with readership figures of over 7.9 million for the English edition and 7.1 million for the Hindi edition.

== TV channel ==
In April 2003, an English language news channel named after the newspaper was launched as a sister network to Aaj Tak.

== India Today Conclave ==
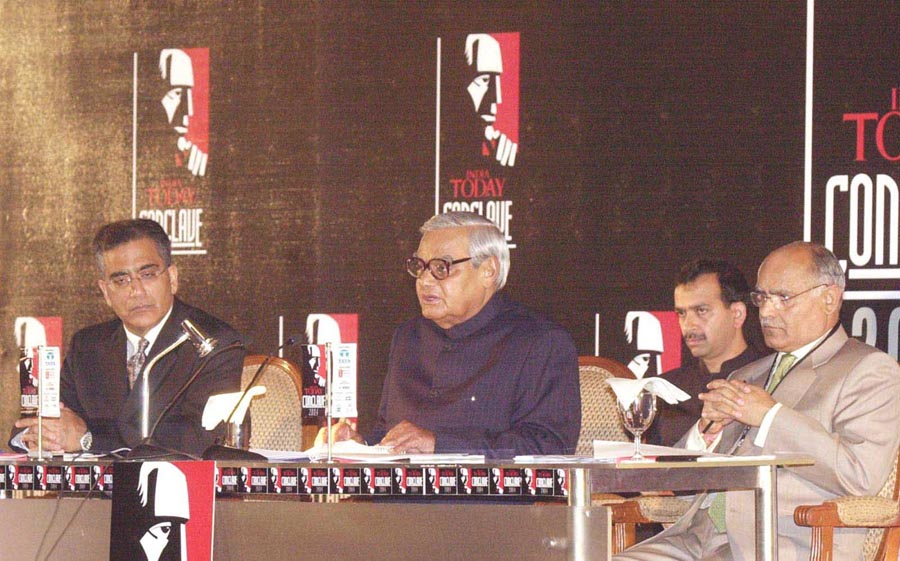
Prime Minister Atal Bihari Vajpayee speaking at the inaugural session of the India Today Conclave in New Delhi, 2004

The India Today Conclave is an annual conference organised by India Today. It has been held since the early 2000s. The event brings together speakers from politics, business, defence, media and academia. They discuss issues related to India and international affairs. Over the years, the conclave has covered topics such as governance, the economy, foreign policy, technology and culture. In 2025, the conclave focused on artificial intelligence, innovation and India's role in international affairs.

Over the years, the conclave has featured political leaders and public figures such as Bill Clinton, Narendra Modi, A. P. J. Abdul Kalam, Atal Bihari Vajpayee, Manmohan Singh, Hillary Clinton, Bill Gates, Imran Khan, Sachin Tendulkar, Shah Rukh Khan, Amitabh Bachchan, and Mukesh Ambani.

== See also ==
- List of newspapers in India
- List of magazines in India
