= Public Cause Research Foundation =

Public Cause Research Foundation (PCRF) was a Delhi, India-based non-governmental organisation (NGO) that campaigned for just, transparent, accountable and participatory governance.

== History ==
Public Cause Research Foundation was established on 19 December 2006 by Arvind Kejriwal, Manish Sisodia and Abhinandan Sekhri. Kejriwal donated the prize money he had received from the Ramon Magsaysay Award as a seed fund.

PCRF was registered under section 80G and 12A of Income tax Act.

== National RTI Awards ==
In 2009, and 2010, PCRF and the Hindustan Times jointly recognised the efforts of several people who had contributed to protecting the right to freedom of information.

There have been no awards since 2010 and, as of 2014, the organisation is no longer listed as an NGO. Its last published accounts were for 2011–2012. Public Cause Research Foundation (PCRF) gained negative attention in 2011 when it was alleged that one of its trustee, Arvind Kejriwal, diverted the donation money collected during India Against Corruption (IAC) Movement led by Anna Hazare into foundation's bank account for personal benefits.

== Trustees ==
- Arvind Kejriwal
- Kiran Bedi
- Prashant Bhushan
- Manish Sisodia
- Abhinandan Sekhri
