= Sujit Nair =

Indian journalist (born 1970)

- Born: 24 August 1970 (age 56); Thane, India
- Education: University of Mumbai (BA, MA)
- Occupation: Advertising
- Spouse: Sunetra Nair
- Children: Siddhant Nair
- Website: hwnews.in

Sujit Nair (born 24 August 1970) is an Indian political commentator and former advertising executive. Currently, he is the chairperson and managing editor of HW News Network. He also runs two shows named Truth Be Told and Editorial.

== Early life and career ==
Born in Thane, Nair's father Mr. P Balakrishnan Nair was a naval officer and his mother Satyabhama Nair is a homemaker. He completed his schooling from St. John's The Baptist High School. He received his both undergraduate and postgraduate degrees from the Mumbai University.

=== Executive director at Lowe Lintas ===
He was a former Executive Director at Lowe Lintas. His experience in direct marketing, mainline advertising, rural marketing and activation helped build a lot of successful brands. During his work in Lowe Lintas he attracted to cooperation a lot of companies such as Tata, Idea Cellular and Castrol. He was also a key member in overseeing Lowe Lintas operations in Kochi, South India, Pune, Ahmedabad and Hyderabad. Lowe Lintas began its south Indian operations under his management as a president with Mayden Pharma that became its first partner in Kochi.

=== Digital media seminars and campaigns ===
Sujit had shown his support to New Media that launched the nationwide Cop-Community Connect seminars to ensure the safety of the denizens of the city. He supported the campaign The Alert Mumbaikar, which promoted public awareness about the issues related to public safety.

== Current Work ==
=== Chairperson and managing editor of HW News Network ===
Sujit is the Chairperson and Managing Editor of HW News Network. HW News is a digital News channel which focuses on Social, Political & Economic scenario of India.

HW News and South Live formed a partnership to collaborate on news production. Together, the platforms cover various topics, with HW News emphasizing on political reporting, and both organizations aiming to deliver objective journalism.

== Other affiliations ==
Sujit also started IACA (India Against Child Abuse) a self-help group to gather like-minded people for raising awareness against child abuse and to help children avail their rights.
