= Madhu Trehan =

Indian journalist

- Education: Welham Girls' School; Columbia University, New York
- Occupations: Journalist, Columnist, Author
- Known for: Founding editor, India Today (1975)
- Notable work: Tehelka as Metaphor (2009)
- Spouse: Naresh Trehan
- Relatives: Aroon Purie (brother), Mandira Purie (sister)

Madhu Purie Trehan (born 1940s) is an Indian journalist. She was also the co-founder and editor-in-chief of a digital media portal called Newslaundry.

== Education ==
Trehan studied at Welham Girls' School in Dehradun, graduating in 1962. In 1968, she went to Harrow Technical College & School of Arts in London to study journalistic photography. She earned a master's degree in journalism from Columbia University, New York in 1972. While in New York City, she worked at the United Nations in their press department, and served as an editor for a weekly newspaper, India Abroad.

== Career ==
Trehan returned to India in 1975 when she founded and started the news magazine India Today, with her father, V.V.Purie, owner of Thomson Press. Trehan left the magazine to her brother's stewardship in 1977 during her pregnancy, and returned to New York to start her family. Upon her return to India in 1986, Trehan produced and anchored Newstrack, India's first video news magazine, which earned her a reputation as a pioneering investigative journalist.

In August 1994, Madhu Trehan took the rare and only interview of Yakub Memon who was convicted in 1993 Bombay bombings.

In 2009, Trehan published her first book, Tehelka as Metaphor: Prism Me a Lie, Tell Me a Truth, examining the 2001 Operation West End exposé and its aftermath.

Trehan has written for leading news magazines and newspapers such as Outlook India and Hindustan Times.

In 2000, she launched Wah India, a website and print magazine. She, along with three other colleagues, also launched a crowd-sourced media critique website called Newslaundry in February 2012.

=== 2001 Delhi High Court ruling ===
On 25 May 2001 the Delhi High Court ruled 3–2 that Trehan and four other journalists on Wah India were guilty of contempt of court for an article which they published "rating the High Court's Judges in terms of various attributes and qualities". The article purportedly interviewed 50 unnamed senior lawyers to reach its conclusions. In April, the court had ordered Delhi police to seize copies of the offending issue from news stands and raid the magazine's Delhi office. The court also banned the media from reporting on the case, but withdrew the ban on 2 May in response to media protest. Three days after being found in contempt of court, Trehan and her colleagues apologised to the justices, and their apology was accepted.

== Personal ==
Trehan is married to Indian heart surgeon Naresh Trehan. Aroon Purie, the former founder-publisher and editor-in-chief of India Today, is her brother, and Bollywood actress Koel Purie is her niece.

== Works ==
- Tehelka as Metaphor: Prism Me a Lie, Tell Me a Truth. Roli Books. 2010. ISBN 978-8174365804.
