= Good Times (TV channel) =

Indian television channel

Goodtimes
- Country: India
- Broadcast area: Nationwide; Worldwide
- Headquarters: Gurugram, Haryana, India

Programming
- Language: English
- Picture format: 1080i HDTV (downscaled to 576i for the SD feed)

Ownership
- Owner: Lifestyle and Media Broadcasting Limited

History
- Launched: 7 September 2007; 18 years ago

Links
- Website: mygoodtimes.in

Goodtimes is a lifestyle channel owned by Lifestyle and Media Broadcasting Limited. It was launched in September 2007 by NDTV. In 2018, NDTV transferred the ownership to Lifestyle and Media Broadcasting Limited.

== Shows ==
- Around The World in 85 Plates
- Bachelor's Kitchen
- Band Baajaa Bride
- Big Fat Indian Wedding
- Bolly Food
- Breaking Bread with Dino Morea
- Breaking Bread with Ramola Bachchan
- Breaking Bread with Riyaaz Amlani
- Breaking Bread with Rohit Bal
- Bucket List Costa Smeralda
- Bucket List Mauritius
- The Buzz
- Chakh le Academy
- Chakh le India
- Chakh le India – Kachcha Raasta
- Check Out China
- Confessions of a Travel Bag
- Cook Eat 'n' Party
- Custom Made for Vir Sanghvi
- Dubai Diaries
- Fat Man & 13 Brides
- The First Ladies
- Foodistan
- FoodMAD
- Gadget Guru
- Game on Singapore
- Get Fit with Rocky and Mayur
- Get The Look
- Gourmet Central
- Great Drives
- Guilt Free
- Heavy Petting
- Highway On My Plate
- I am Too Sexy for My Shoes
- Imagine Your Korea
- In The Spotlight!
- India Explored Manipur
- Jai Hind with Rocky & Mayur
- Kingfisher Supermodels
- Life's A Beach
- Lock Stock and Two Smoking Tikkas
- The Lounge
- Love Bites With Joey
- Luxe Interiors
- Making of the Kingfisher Calendar
- The Mavericks
- My Yellow Table
- Nirvana Travels
- No Big Deal
- Olive It Up
- One Life to Love
- Royal Reservation
- Spectacular Spas Around The World
- Spectacular Spas For Men
- Swiss Made Adventures
- Swiss Made Challenge
- Swiss Made Dreams
- Swiss Made Grand Tour
- Ten Things To Do Before You Say Bye
- Ten Things To Do Around The World
- Travelling Diva
- Vicky Goes Desi
- Vicky Goes Foreign – Canada Tadka
- Vicky Goes Veg
- Warrior Tribes of Nagaland
- A Whole New World
- Yarri Dostii Shaadi
- Yoga City
- Yogasutra
- You Got Magic with Neel Madhav
- Zaika India Ka

== Anchors ==
- Ambika Anand
- Bharat Arora
- Aditya Bal
- Dino Morea
- Sarah Jayne Bedford
- Freishia Bomanbehram
- Sumona Chakravarti
- Seema Chandra
- Vikram Chandra
- Meiyang Chang
- Rasik Chopra
- Samara Chopra
- Ritu Dalmia
- Neha Dhupia
- Neha Dixit
- Ridhi Dogra
- Amrita Gandhi
- Arlette Evita Grao
- Kaisha Hastu
- Maya Hendricks
- Rajat Kapoor
- Kunal Kapur
- Rahul Khanna
- Neel Madhav
- Rajiv Makhni
- Joey Matthew
- Varun Mitra
- Karuna Ezaara Parikh
- Vicky Ratnani
- Seema Rehmani
- Ayesha Sharma
- Mayur Sharma
- Rocky Singh
- Marut Sikka
- Perizaad Zorabian
