= Living Media India =

Media conglomerate based in New Delhi, India

Living Media India Limited
- Trade name: India Today Group
- Type: Public
- Traded as: BSE: 532515; NSE: TVTODAY
- Industry: Mass media
- Founded: 1975; 51 years ago
- Founders: Aroon Purie
- Headquarters: New Delhi, India
- Key people: Aroon Purie (Chairman); Ashish Bagga (CEO); Kallie Purie (Vice Chairwoman)
- Products: Broadcasting; publishing; radio; web portals
- Revenue: ▼₹820 crore (US$85 million) (2021)
- Operating income: ▼₹196 crore (US$20 million) (2021)
- Net income: ▼₹131 crore (US$14 million) (2021)
- Number of employees: 1,849 (2021)
- Website: indiatodaygroup.com

Living Media India Limited, d.b.a. India Today Group, is an Indian media conglomerate based in New Delhi, India. It has interests in magazines, newspapers, books, radio, television, printing and the Internet.

== History ==
India Today Group was founded in 1975 by Aroon Purie and Madhu Trehan and its first publication was India Today which was a fortnightly news magazine. Aroon Purie is the current chairman and editor-in-chief and Dinesh Bhatia is the current CEO of India Today Group.

== TV Today Network ==
The TV Today Network is an English-Hindi Indian news television network based in India. The TV Today Network was incorporated in 1988, launching a video magazine called Newstrack. At that time, private television broadcasting was prohibited in India. Newstrack produced its programmes on videotape and distributed them to subscribers. The New York Times described them as fast-paced video magazines of investigative reporting, similar to CBS News 60 Minutes.

Madhu Trehan, a sibling of Arun Poorie and a graduate of Columbia University Graduate School of Journalism, was the creator of Newstrack and also served as one of its anchors. Having started with five to six journalists, it grew to a size of 30. The length of the programmes also increased from initial 30 minutes to eventual 90 minutes. The high points of Newstrack's coverage were those of Kashmiri militancy and the demolition of the Babri Masjid. It is listed on the BSE and the NSE and consists of the several news channels namely, Aaj Tak, India Today, Good News Today, Aaj Tak HD and digital channels distributed through its websites or YouTube.

=== Television channels ===
Channel	Language	Category	Launched	Closed
Aajtak	Hindi	News	30 September 1995	
Aajtak HD	Hindi	News	14 December 2018	
Good News Today	Hindi	News	5 September 2021	
India Today	English	News	7 April 2003	
Aajtak Tez	Hindi	News	22 August 2005	4 September 2021

=== Digital channels ===
Channel	Launched	Language	Category
Business Today	2018	Hindi	Business News
Aajtak 2	2023	Hindi	News
Prime Time	2022	Hindi	News
So Sorry	2014	Hindi	News

== Publications ==
- India Today
- Business Today
- Reader's Digest
- Harper's Bazaar
- Auto Today
- Cosmopolitan
- Brides Today
- Mail Today
- Target
- Today

== Other divisions ==
- Ishq 104.8 FM (Radio)
- India Today Media Institute
- Thomson Press
- Care Today
- Vasant Valley School
