= Aaj Tak =

Hindi news channel

- Country: India
- Broadcast area: International
- Network: TV Today Network
- Headquarters: Noida, Uttar Pradesh, India

Programming
- Language: Hindi
- Picture format: 16:9 (1080i HDTV) (downscaled to 576i for the SDTV feed)

Ownership
- Owner: Living Media
- Sister channels: India Today; Good News Today; Dilli Aaj Tak

History
- Launched: 31 December 2000; 25 years ago SDTV; 14 December 2018; 7 years ago HDTV

Links
- Webcast: aajtak.in/livetv
- Website: aajtak.in

Aaj Tak (transl. Until Today) is an Indian Hindi-language right-wing television news channel owned by the TV Today Network, a part of the New Delhi-based media conglomerate India Today Group.

== History ==
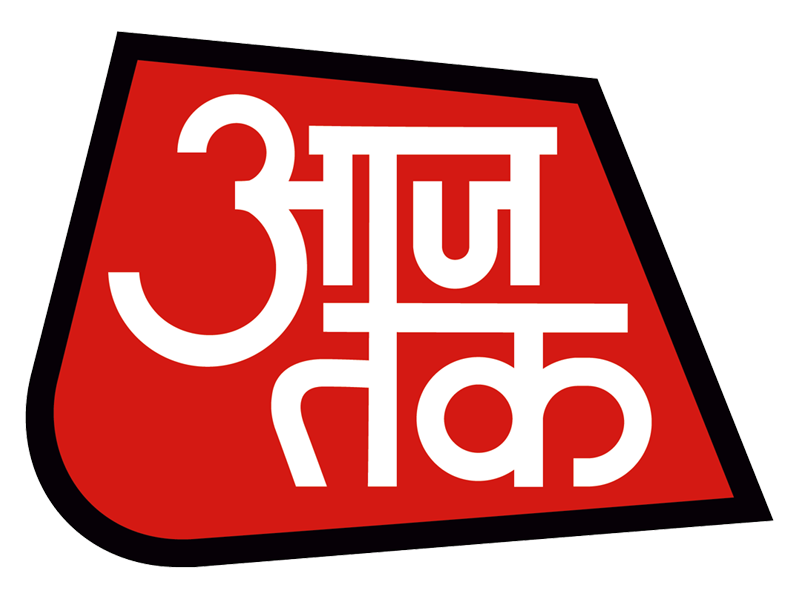
Logo formerly used by Aaj Tak

Aaj Tak was first broadcast on DD Metro of Doordarshan (DD) in 1995. It was then broadcast as a news programme of 10 to 20 minutes. Aaj Tak came into existence in December 2000 as an independent news channel. It then became the first complete Hindi news channel in the country to be broadcast twenty-four hours. One of the anchors at the time was Surendra Pratap Singh. The tagline for Aaj Tak was "यह थी ख़बर आज तक, इंतज़ार कीजिए कल तक" (transl. That's all the news for today, wait until tomorrow). Aaj Tak was the first news channel in India to use OB vans.

By the time the channel came into existence, it had a reach of 52 lakh households. It now broadcasts to three crore households and its viewership in news channels is 56%. On 14 December 2018, Aaj Tak launched India's first Hindi high-definition channel, Aaj Tak HD. A channel rebranding took place in January 2021.

In September 2001, during the World Trade Center attacks, Aaj Tak achieved the highest viewership ratings among 15 markets, according to Nielsen Media Research. In Delhi, the channel's viewership was at 23 percent on September 11 and rose to 39 percent by September 15.

In March 2023, the India Today Group introduced Sana for Aaj Tak, the nation's first AI-powered news anchor designed to deliver daily news updates in multiple languages. Sana also facilitates interactive question-and-answer sessions aimed at increasing audience engagement.

=== Aaj Tak HD ===
On 14 December 2018, Aaj Tak launched India's first Hindi high-definition channel, Aaj Tak HD. Aaj Tak HD broadcasts news and two extra shows like Duniya Aaj Tak aired from 2019 (transl. World up to the minute) covering world news, Business Aaj Tak aired from 2019 (transl. Business up to the minute) covering the financial news of India and the world.

Aaj Tak HD also broadcast Movie Masala between 2019 and 2020 (transl. Movie Spice), covering the news of Bollywood.

== Staff ==
=== Executive staff ===
- Aroon Purie, Chairperson, India Today Group
- Kalli Purie, Vice-Chairperson, India Today Group
- Anjana Om Kashyap, Executive Editor
- Sweta Singh, Executive Editor
- Sayeed Ansari, Consulting Editor
- Vikrant Gupta, Chief Sports Editor

=== Past staff ===
Past anchors have included Rohit Sardana and Surendra Pratap Singh. Uday Shankar worked as a news director during the initial years of Aaj Tak.

- Sudhir Chaudhary
- Prabhu Chawla
- Punya Prasun Bajpai
- Boria Majumdar
- Ashutosh Gupta

== Events and controversies ==
The channel has been penalized for the propagation of misinformation and criticised for its coverage being supportive of the ideology of the ruling government of the Bharatiya Janata Party and has been included among "Godi media" news outlets who are supportive of the Narendra Modi government. A 2024 report by Bloomberg said that Aaj Tak was "frequently laudatory of Modi". Prashanth Bhat & Kalyani Chadha in a 2024 article attributed its supportive coverage of the BJP's agenda, including "promoting nationalism and majoritarianism and advancing the government narrative" as well as those of other Indian news channels to economic incentives to obtain high television ratings in emulation of the content and high ratings obtained by Times Now and Republic TV.

In 2017, Aaj Tak was criticised for propagating a false claim that a fatwa allowed Saudi Arabian men to eat their wives. That same year, Aaj Tak also came under criticism for propagating a false claim that the Indian Army had retaliated against Pakistan following attacks against Indian personnel in Kashmir.

In October 2020, Aaj Tak was fined ₹1 lakh and asked to broadcast apologies for fake news regarding Sushant Singh Rajput. The channel published fabricated last tweets by the actor on the channel, claiming that they were made by him a few days before his death and then deleted. Aaj Tak later removed its article with this fake news published in it.

Aaj Tak was fined ₹5 lakh by Broadcast Audience Research Council for viewership manipulation in a TRP scam.

Between 4 and 5 April 2020, Aaj Tak had broadcast reports about Tablighi Jamaat. A complaint was filed with the News Broadcasting and Digital Standards Authority (NBDSA) in which Aaj Tak was accused of intending to "develop hatred in the minds of the people against a particular community," during the COVID-19 pandemic in India.

On 16 June 2021, the NBDSA directed that Aaj Tak's broadcasts be taken down from all Internet platforms that linked the COVID-19 outbreak with Tablighi Jamaat in 2020, citing potential "errors in the figures telecast".

The NBDSA said that the media has "complete freedom to report on the COVID pandemic", but "such reporting must be done with accuracy, impartiality and neutrality", and added, " The NBDSA noted that the broadcaster had admitted that there may have been chances that there were some miscalculations as pointed out by the complaint, which was inadvertent, and the broadcaster had no intention to communalise the issue or malign any community."

In June 2022, the NBDSA said that Aaj Tak's taglines on Umar Khalid ‘gave an impression that the accused had already been declared guilty’ and asked the news channel to take down those shows.

In March 2023, Aaj Tak faced widespread social media ridicule after the clip of its coverage went viral, where the channel's representatives were seen filming gangster Atiq Ahmed urinating while in transit from Gujarat to Prayagraj under the custody of police.

In March 2024, NBDSA fined Aaj Tak for Sudhir Chaudhary's 'tukde tukde' and 'Khalistani' remarks, against the former US president Barack Obama and penalised the channel over 'Love Jihad' shows.

In March 2024, NBDSA directed Aaj Tak to remove a fictional video aired during its Black and White show, which depicted Congress leader Rahul Gandhi as a robber. The NBDSA found the video to be in poor taste and stated that it did not align with ethical broadcasting standards. The authority warned the channel to exercise greater caution in future broadcasts to avoid misrepresentation and potential defamation.

Aaj Tak has also been accused of foreign interference in the Canadian matters by the Rapid Response Mechanism Canada.

During the 2025 conflict between India and Pakistan over Kashmir, the channel was criticised by Alt News for airing fabricated information about the conflict.

== Accolades ==
According to an old 2006 poll jointly conducted by the BBC and Reuters, of specific news sources spontaneously mentioned by the Indians, Aaj Tak (mentioned by 11%) was the most trusted.

Aaj Tak has won the award for the "Best Hindi News Channel" 19 times, since 2001 at the Indian Television Academy Awards. Aaj Tak was awarded the Indian Television Academy Award for Best Hindi News Channel for consecutive years from 2001 to 2015, and again from 2017 to 2020.

In 2015, 7th Exchange4media News Broadcasting Awards (ENBA) ceremony Aaj Tak was recognized as the "Best News Channel of the Year," and won in the categories for Best Anchor in Hindi, and received the Best Channel Marketing Award. Additionally, Aaj Tak secured awards for Best News Producer and Best Video Editor.

Aaj Tak is ranked 32nd among the 50 most-subscribed YouTube channels. In February 2025, Aaj Tak became the first news channel globally to reach 70 million subscribers on YouTube.

== See also ==
- Good News Today
- Dilli Aaj Tak
- Godi media
