= Internet censorship in India =

Internet censorship in India is implemented through various legal, administrative and judicial mechanisms. Service providers use domain name system (DNS) filtering and deep packet inspection (DPI) techniques to ensure compliance with government policies regarding regulation and blocking of access to offending digital content at a large scale. Social media platforms are also expected to remove content based on take-down requests received through various governing agencies. Removal of content is also enacted at the request of content creators through court orders.

Freedom House's Freedom on the Net 2024 report gives India a status of "Partly Free" with a rating of 50 (on a 0–100 scale, where higher is better), having increased from 41 in 2017. Its Obstacles to Access rating was 14 (0-25 scale); Limits on Content, 19 (0-35 scale); and Violations of User Rights, 17 (0-40 scale). Out of 70 countries rated in the report, India was ranked thirty-seventh. Note that prior to 2019, Freedom House utilized a reversed scoring methodology (where a lower score indicated greater freedom). The Freedom on the Net 2017 report gave India the same status of "Partly Free" with a rating of 41 (scale from 0 to 100, lower is better). Its Obstacles to Access rating was 12 (0–25 scale); Limits on Content, 9 (0–35 scale); and Violations of User Rights, 20 (0–40 scale). Out of the 65 countries included in the report, India was ranked twenty-sixth.

== Background ==
In 2003, the Government of India established the Indian Computer Emergency Response Team (CERT-IN) to ensure Internet security. The agency has since been responsible for accepting and reviewing requests to block access to specific websites. Prior to 2008, censorship of Internet content by the Indian government was relatively rare and sporadic, sometimes entering agreements with network such as in 2007, when Indian law enforcement entered an agreement with the then-popular social networking site Orkut to track down what it deemed defamatory content. In the face of heightened public sentiment in prioritizing response to security threats following Mumbai terror attacks, Information Technology Act, 2008 was passed, expanding censorship and monitoring capabilities. Although there was no sustained government policy or strategy to block access to Internet content on a large scale, measures for removing certain content from the web, sometimes for fear they could incite violence, had become more common. Pressure on private companies to remove information perceived to endanger public order or national security had increased since late 2009 with the implementation of the amended ITA. Companies were required to have designated employees to receive government blocking requests, and assigned up to seven years' imprisonment to private service providers—including ISPs, search engines, and cyber cafés—that did not comply with the government's blocking requests.

Internet users had sporadically faced prosecution for online postings, and private companies hosting the content were obliged by law to hand over user information to the authorities. In 2009, the Supreme Court ruled that bloggers and moderators could face libel suits and even criminal prosecution for comments posted on their websites. Prior judicial approval for communications interception was not required, and both central and state governments had the power to issue directives on interception, monitoring, and decryption. All licensed ISPs were obliged by law to sign an agreement allowing Indian government authorities to access user data.

Pre-screening of user generated content was also discussed but proper realization was not achieved.

The OpenNet Initiative (ONI) classified India as engaged in selective Internet censorship under guise of security in the political, conflict/security, social, and Internet tools areas in 2011, while noting that the attempts remained ineffective due to circumvention methods such as blocked content being migrated to other websites. The Freedom on the Net 2012 report stated that India's overall Internet Freedom Status was "Partly Free", unchanged from 2009. In March 2012, Reporters Without Borders added India to its list of "countries under surveillance".

Under the Narendra Modi administration, blocking requests rapidly increased from 6,000 requests annually in January 2018 to 12,600 in 2024. Takedown requests were sent through email or conveyed to social media representatives through a biweekly meeting informally termed as "69A meetings." The Washington Post reported in 2023, that internal sources claimed the meetings had become longer over the years, and sometimes spilling over into days. Following the creation of Sahyog portal by Ministry of Home Affairs in October 2024, to automate sending of takedown requests under Section 79(3)(b) of the Information Technology Act (IT Act), 2000, the number of takedown requests nearly doubled again within a single year to 24,300 in 2025. Blocking orders have increasingly targeted criticisms or parodies of Modi or the Hindutva ideology of the ruling BJP with this resulting in accounts being withheld in some cases.

The administration is also establishing transformative legislative provisions granting the MEITy and the Ministry of Information Broadcasting (MIB) expanded powers to enforce censorship, citing reasons such as obscenity, protection of Indian values (concerning YouTube commentaries and over-the-top media (OTT) shows), the prevention of "anti-national online content" (such as content covering cross-border conflicts and separatism), and cybercrime prevention (fraud, impersonation, and synthetic abuse). There has also been instances of the government issuing blanket bans, with invocation of national security, potential to cause chaos, and hurt sentiments which have been criticized as disproportionate.

The adoption of IT Rules, 2021, is criticized for forcing takedown compliance of social media intermediaries with the threat of criminal prosecution of Indian resident enforcing officers, that are mandated by the rule, by removing safe harbor protections previously granted by section 79 of the IT act for social media intermediaries against content posted on their platform. Twitter was highly critical of the move and initially resisted compliance with the act but the company eventually complied with takedown notices and unsuccessfully sued the 2021 blocking orders against accounts linked to farmers' protest for not providing reason in blocking orders and targeting withholding of accounts against previously established norms. Digital and human rights advocates have also criticized the rule as a "regulatory contagion" of internet censorship mechanism, for inspiring similar legislature in Myanmar and Nigeria with nearly identical language.

Since February 2026, the takedown notice response period for online publishing platforms has been reduced from a 36-hour window that was followed previously, to just 3 hours (with an exception of 2 hours for posts regarding non-consensual nudity) which is the shortest content takedown timeline prescribed by any government. The grievance redressal period was also reduced from 14 days to 7 days. To comply with the three-hour takedown timeline, Meta, which receives majority of India's takedown requests, has integrated an API with Sahyog portal to automatically takedown content without a human review. Additionally although Meta discloses legal details of takedown requests to its users in majority cases, it excludes seven countries including India citing "legal obligations and regulatory considerations."

In March 2026, amidst reports of escalated takedown actions of withholding social media accounts, MEITy published draft IT second amendment rules expanding MIB oversight mechanism beyond publications and OTT platforms to "intermediaries and users who are not 'publishers' and post/share news and current affairs content online".

== Censorship framework ==
In June 2000, the Indian Parliament enacted the Information Technology Act (ITA) to establish a legal framework for regulating Internet use and commerce, including digital signatures, security, and hacking. The Act criminalised the publishing of obscene information electronically and granted police powers to search any premises without a warrant and arrest individuals in violation. A 2008 amendment to the IT Act reinforced the government's power to block Internet sites and content, and criminalised sending messages deemed inflammatory or offensive. The enforcement of content blocking is carried out through IT rules that are updated and notified regularly such as in the years 2009, 2011 and 2021, with amendments to the IT rules, 2021 passed in 2022, 2023 and 2026. In addition, the Ministry of Electronics and Information Technology (MEITy) formed in 2016, issues executive advisories for compliance with the IT rules in the evolving digital landscape such as in 2023, regarding AI generated deepfakes and in 2024, regarding stricter compliance with the IT rules.

=== CERT-IN ===
In 2003, the Government of India established the Indian Computer Emergency Response Team (CERT-IN) to ensure Internet security, with a stated mission "to enhance the security of India's Communications and Information Infrastructure through proactive action and effective collaboration". CERT-IN is the agency that accepts and reviews requests to block access to specific websites. All licensed Indian ISPs must comply with its decisions, and there is no review or appeals process. Many institutions, including the Ministry of Home Affairs, courts, the intelligence services, the police and the National Human Rights Commission, may call on it for specialist expertise. By stretching the prohibition against publishing obscene content to include filtering of Web sites, CERT-IN was empowered to review complaints and act as sole authority for issuing blocking instructions to the DoT. Many have argued that giving CERT-IN this power through executive order violates constitutional jurisprudence holding that specific legislation must be passed before the government can encroach on individual rights.

In 2022, under national security grounds, new regulations were implemented by CERT-IN to require retention of customer data by VPN, web hosting services, and cloud service providers for five years. Most major VPN providers operating in India, announced that they would no longer use servers under Indian jurisdiction in order to preserve the privacy of their customers and also withdrew their infrastructure from the country.

On November 23, 2023, a gazette notification was issued stating that the second schedule of Right to Information (RTI) Act, 2005 was amended to exempting CERT-IN from RTI requests excluding those related to allegations of corruption or human rights issues. In a response to an RTI request of documents concerning its exemption, Department of Personnel and Training (DoPT) stated that its inclusion in second schedule of the act is "of secret nature". In 2025, MEITy rejected RTI request on information regarding blocking order issued to social media intermediaries citing section 8(1)(a) concerning national security and IT rules for keeping the information classified.

=== IT (Procedure & Safeguards for Blocking) Rules, 2009 ===
IT (Procedure and Safeguards for Blocking for Access of Information by Public) Rules, 2009, is a central government legislation that was introduced to impliment and regulate the blocking of information from public access.

=== IT (Intermediaries Guidelines) Rules, 2011 ===
The "IT Rules 2011" were adopted in April 2011 as a supplement to the 2000 Information Technology Act (ITA). The new rules required Internet companies to remove within 36 hours of being notified by the authorities any content deemed objectionable, particularly if its nature were identified as "defamatory", "hateful", "harmful to minors", or "infringes copyright". Cyber café owners were required to photograph their customers; follow instructions on how their cafés should be set up so all computer screens were in plain sight; keep copies of client IDs and their browsing histories for one year; and forward this data to the government each month.

=== Shreya Singhal v. Union of India, 2015 ===
Shreya Singhal v. Union of India was a landmark Supreme Court case that invalidated section 66A of IT Act entirely as unconstitutionally vague and threating to freedom of expression guaranteed under Article 19(1)(a) of the Indian Constitution.

=== Draft IT (Intermediary Guidelines Amendment) Rules, 2018 ===
Under the new proposed rules, Indian officials could demand Facebook, Google, Twitter, TikTok, WhatsApp, and other platforms to remove posts or videos that the officials deemed unlawful or an invasion of privacy and could trace a message to its original sender which is particularly threatening to end-to-end encryption messaging platforms.

=== Bhasin v. Union of India, 2019 ===
Bhasin v. Union of India was a landmark Supreme Court case that ruled that indefinite suspension of internet services was illegal under Indian law, and that internet shutdowns must satisfy tests of nessecity and proportionality. It also held that any such order must be made public and was subject to judicial review.

=== IT (Intermediary Guidelines & Digital Media Ethics Code) Rules, 2021 ===
In Febrauary 2026, Information Technology (Intermediary Guidelines and Digital Media Ethics Code) Rules 2021, was notified, as a replacement of IT Rules 2011 for governing the social media landscape. For organizations classified as significant social media intermediaries, it requires appointment of Chief Compliance Officer, Nodal contact person and a resident grievance officer, all of whom should be resident of India and also mandates publication of monthly compliance report of complaints and action taken. Non-compliance with the act is made a punishable offense with imprisonment upto 7 years and fine. Rule 4(2) also requires determination of first originator of a message which puts operational principle of end to end encryption platforms under pressure. The rules also establish a Code of Ethics that is governed by an inter departmental committee of officers appointed by the Government to recomment MIB to delete or block content published by news agencies and OTT platform.

=== IT (IGDMEC) Amendment Rules, 2022 ===
IT Amendment rules, 2022 introduced the formation of a government appointed body, known as a Grievance Appellate Committee (GAC), for handling user appeals against content moderation decisions of intermediaries. Critics have raised concerns with the amendment such as lack of transparency and facilitation of arbitrary blocking of content beyond the scope of IT act.

=== IT (IGDMEC) Amendment Rules, 2023 ===
In April 2023, new regulations were enacted that would require online intermediaries to censor and remove content deemed to be false or misleading by a body appointed by MEITy. Comedian and political satirist, Kunal Kamra, challenged the amendment in the Bombay High Court, arguing the rules would result in sweeping self-censorship. The high court delivered a split verdict although, the Supreme Court of India intervened and placed a stay on the notification of the Fact Check Unit pending further constitutional review.

=== Sahyog portal ===
The Ministry of Home Affairs' Indian Cyber Crime Coordination Centre (I4C) created the Sahyog portal, operational since October 2024, to automate the sending of takedown requests under Section 79(3)(b) of the Information Technology Act (IT Act), 2000, which states that digital platforms can be held accountable for failing to remove unlawful content after the government or its agencies report it. The platform makes provisions for challenging takedown notices and was favorably received by 38 IT intermediaries, including Microsoft, Google, Meta, Sharechat, and LinkedIn, as of 2025. Conversely, some companies expressed criticism; X Corp. challenged the move in court, alleging it bypassed the safeguards of Sections 79 and 69A of the IT Act and questioned its impact on free speech although the Sahyog portal was upheld as an "instrument of public good" in the resulting case, X Corp v. Union of India.

=== IT Amendment Rules, 2026 ===
Information Technology (Intermediary Guidelines and Digital Media Ethics Code) Amendment Rules, 2026, notified by the Centre on February 10, 2026, mandate tools to detect and label synthetically generated information (SGI), requires platforms to warn users about terms of service compliance every three months, and significantly lowers the takedown notice response period. Platforms must now respond to takedown requests within 3 hours (and 2 hours for non-consensual nudity), creating the shortest content takedown timeline prescribed by any government. The grievance redressal period was also reduced from 14 days to 7 days. While some welcomed the move as necessary regulation for synthetic content, critics cited a lack of public consultation and warned that a 3-hour response window could pressure tech platforms to err on the side of censorship to retain their Section 79 ITA immunity. The US Trade representative (USTR) criticized the move as the imposition of an impractical compliance deadline and noted an increased quantity of politically motivated takedown requests.

=== Draft IT Rules (second amendment) 2026 ===
On 31 March 2026, MEITy published draft IT second amendment rules, 2026. The draft proposed expanding the MIB oversight mechanism beyond publications and OTT platforms to include "intermediaries and users who are not 'publishers' and post/share news and current affairs content online". It also required all intermediaries and platforms to adhere to any "clarification, advisory, order, direction, standard operating procedure, or guideline issued by the MEITy," effectively removing the distinction between voluntary advisories and mandatory compliance. Digital rights activists, including the Internet Freedom Foundation (IFF), criticized the move as "digital authoritarianism" and a circumvention method to control media independence.

== Notable Incidents ==
One of the first notable incident of censorship followed immediately after the Kargil War in 1999, when the website of the Pakistani daily newspaper Dawn was temporarily blocked from access within India by Videsh Sanchar Nigam Limited, a government-owned telecommunications company that at the time had monopoly control of the international Internet gateways in India. Rediff, a media news website, claimed that the ban was instigated by the Indian government and subsequently published detailed instructions allowing users to bypass the filter and view the site.

=== Cartoons Against Corruption ===
In 2011, a nationwide anti-corruption movement, India Against Corruption, gathered pace under the leadership of a veteran Gandhian, Anna Hazare, demanding passage of the Jan Lokpal Bill to put an ombudsman in place with power to deal with corruption in public places. Aseem Trivedi, a political cartoonist, started a cartoon-based campaign in support, Cartoons Against Corruption. On the first day of the anti-corruption protests where he also displayed his work, he received an email from the website's domain name registrar notifying of suspension of domain name due to a complaint from Crime Branch, Mumbai for displaying objectionable pictures and texts related to flag and emblem of India.

Following the ban on his website, Trivedi uploaded all the cartoons to a blog he quickly created. The experience turned Trivedi towards anti-censorship activism. He started a movement protesting internet censorship in India, along with his journalist friend Alok Dixit, “Save Your Voice”.

=== Blocking of Savukku.net site ===
In an interim order on a petition filed by a newsreader, Madras High court ordered blocking of the website www.savukku.net which had previously exposed tapes of communication between influential figures. The incident was criticized since it contradicted an earlier order by the same court against banning the entire website instead of specific URLs, and also since the Judge involved was considered close friend to one of the figures affected by the expose.

=== 2012 Assam violence ===
Between 18 and 21 August 2012, the Government of India ordered more than 300 specific URLs blocked which was considered unprecedented. The blocked articles, accounts, groups, and videos were said to contain inflammatory content with fictitious details relating to Assam violence and supposedly promoting the North East exodus. These URLs included the domains of Facebook, Twitter, YouTube, BlogSpot, WordPress, Google Plus, the Times of India, Wikipedia, and others. Many of the blocked URLs focused on right-wing activism against corruption in India, including website of Rashtriya Swayamsevak Sangh.

=== Farmers' protests ===
In February 2021, Twitter refused to comply with orders from the Indian government to ban 1,474 accounts and 175 tweets, many of which were related to farmers' protests and some tweets that Twitter termed innocuous. The government warned Twitter employees multiple times that they could face up to seven years in jail if the company failed to remove certain accounts that the government alleged were spreading misinformation, following which it communicated compliance of the orders "under protest" on July 2. This was successful in blocking over 500 accounts and had also reduced the visibility of several hashtags that violated its rules, stating, however, that accounts belonging to news media outlets, journalists, and activists or politicians were not taken down.

Following the incident, Twitter unsuccessfully sued the 2021 blocking orders for not providing reason in the blocking orders and for withholding accounts instead of targeting specific messages, against norms established by Shreya Singhal v. Union of India, 2015 and 69A of the IT act respectively. Twitter issued similar resistance to blocking orders imposed over government criticism of handling of the COVID-19 pandemic in April of the same year, but was eventually forced to comply. Since Elon Musk's acquisition of the platform, which rebranded to X, it has complied with blocking orders.

=== India China Standoff ===
In June 2020, in retaliation for a military clash between Indian and Chinese troops in a disputed territory along the shared border between Ladakh and western China, the Indian government banned around 60 mobile apps published by Chinese companies, most notably including TikTok, WeChat, and mobile games such as PUBG Mobile. The stated reason for the bans was to protect India's sovereignty, integrity, and security, and its citizens from software that was "stealing and surreptitiously transmitting users' data in an unauthorised manner to servers outside India". The ban received mixed response by journalists, commentators and internet activists.

China claims that India has banned over 300 mobile applications over the period of 2020-2025, and has argued against the bans as discriminatory on multiple occasions at WTO meetings.

=== Asian News International vs. Wikimedia Foundation ===
In July 2024, Asian News International (ANI) filed a lawsuit against the Wikimedia Foundation in the Delhi High Court, claiming to have been defamed in its article on Wikipedia, and seeking ₹2 crore (equivalent to ₹2.1 crore or US$230,000 in 2026) in damages. On 5 September, the Court threatened to hold Wikimedia in contempt for failing to disclose information about the editors who had made changes to the article, warning that Wikipedia might be blocked in India upon further non-compliance. In response, Wikimedia emphasised that the information in the article was supported by multiple reliable secondary sources. On 21 October, the Wikimedia Foundation suspended access to the article for the lawsuit itself, due to an order from the Court stating that the article violated the sub judice principle. This is believed to be the first time an English Wikipedia page had been taken down after a court order.

On 17 March 2025, at a hearing in the Supreme Court of India, a two-judge bench reversed the Delhi High Court ruling stating that judges and courts should be more tolerant of criticism and that requiring removal of content because of criticism might not be correct. At the same time, the judges also stated that the order was about freedom of the press. On 9 May 2025, access to the article was restored.

=== India Pakistan Standoff ===
India banned 16 Pakistani YouTube channels with 63 million subscribers for spreading provocative communal content after the Pahalgam terror attack, based on recommendations from the Home Ministry. On 9 May, amidst the 2025 India–Pakistan standoff, the Indian government ordered X (formerly Twitter) to withhold 8,000 accounts from India. The block list included foreign media Global Times, Xinhua News Agency, and TRT World; Indian news outlets Maktoob Media, The Kashmiriyat and The Wire; and prominent journalists, including Anuradha Bhasin. X stated that it had not received information on specific posts, and in some cases no evidence or justification at all, for the accounts ordered blocked. France 24 linked the blocking spree to a campaign targeting the social media of prominent Pakistani individuals and media.

=== 2026 NEET irregularity ===
A platform-wide ban was issued on the Telegram messenger for one week until 22 June 2026, enacted as "a response to the organised use of the platform by cheating rackets to defraud candidates appearing for the NEET (UG) 2026 re-examination scheduled on 21 June 2026," affecting over 150 million active users of the platform in India. The ban was executed despite Telegram's compliance with previous orders to block 1,300 links related to the exam leaks. Telegram challenged the ban as an infringement on free speech rights; however, the Delhi High Court upheld the ban, citing the "emergency nature" of the order and the potential for the platform to be used to spread misinformation and cause public disorder. In a related series of protests organized by Cockroach Janata Party (CJP), whose X account was previously withheld by a blocking order citing 'potential to create chaos', internet connectivity was briefly shutdown in regions of protests in New Delhi, without any notice or publication, which prompted internet activists to call for stricter adherence to safeguards set by Bhasin v. Union of India, 2019. MEITy had ordered removal of github repository for BitChat, an open-source peer-to-peer encrypted communication application that operated on Bluetooth mesh network, based on rumors of its use during the protest. BitChat was removed from Google PlayStore and AppStore in India in October 2026, in the backdrop of a different protest that was also being organized by the CJP.

== Blocked websites ==
Screenshot of a blocked site

The process of blocking websites in India is non-transparent and the government does not maintain a public list of all the blocked websites.

Over the years, the government has banned thousands of websites and URLs in the country with the help of ISPs or under court directive. For example, in August 2015, the central government of India ordered the Telecom Regulatory Authority of India (TRAI) and ISPs based in India to ban domestic and international porn websites; and in June 2016, it further banned over 200 URLs for providing "escort services". In response, nearly 857 websites were blocked.

Star India Pvt. Ltd. successfully gained court authorisation to force ISPs to block entire websites to tackle internet piracy of its copyrighted content. Critics and digital rights activists raised concerns over these proceedings, alleging that the orders were overly broad, targeted platforms with user-generated content, and lacked proper expiry periods for the blocks. Prathiba M Singh, representing Star India, cited the poor resources of media companies to constantly track individual infringing URLs as justification for domain-level blocking. Legal representatives for the company termed the targeted sites "rogue websites." Critics argued this approach favored corporate interests over a free internet and restricted legitimate access.

In August 2016, reports circulated that users could face a three-year jail sentence and a ₹300,000 (equivalent to ₹470,000 or US$5,000 in 2026) fine for merely viewing or accessing blocked torrent websites, due to a specific warning message displayed by ISPs like Tata Communications and Airtel. The message cited Sections 63, 63-A, 65, and 65-A of the Copyright Act, 1957. This caused widespread concern among internet users and legal experts regarding potential overreach and mass arrests. However, the Bombay High Court subsequently clarified that simply viewing a blocked copyright-infringing website does not constitute a punishable offence under the Copyright Act, and directed ISPs to modify the overly broad warning messages to accurately reflect the law.

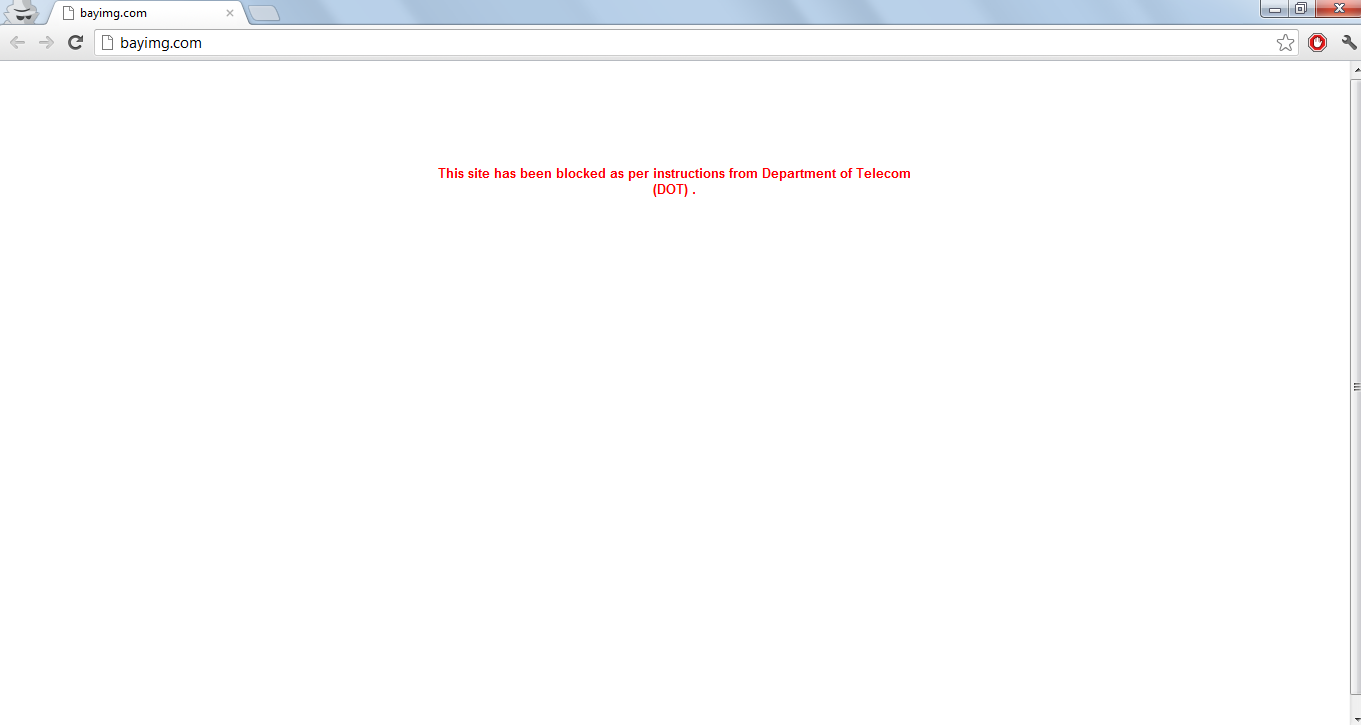
Bayimg.com blocked by orders of Department of Telecom on BSNL broadband network in India as of 13 September 2012

The warning message initially provided to Tata and Airtel users read:

This URL has been blocked under the instructions of the Competent Government Authority or in compliance with the orders of a Court of competent jurisdiction. Viewing, downloading, exhibiting or duplicating an illicit copy of the contents under this URL is punishable as an offence under the laws of India, including but not limited to under Sections 63, 63-A, 65 and 65-A of the Copyright Act, 1957 which prescribe imprisonment for three years and also fine of up to Rs. 3,00,000/-. Any person aggrieved by any such blocking of this URL may contact at urlblock [at] tatacommunications [dot] com who will, within 48 hours, provide the details of relevant proceedings under which the relevant High Court or Authority can be approached for redressal of the grievance.

Patent lawyers suggested making practical changes in copyright laws to match the current e-environment, such as making materials accessible within six months to one year and protecting the content from manipulation and creative infringement to lessen piracy problems.

In a response to a right to information (RTI) application by SFLC India, the Ministry of Electronics and Information Technology stated that 14,221 websites/URLs had been blocked between 2010 and 2018.

== Blocked mobile applications ==
This is a list of notable applications that have been banned in India pursuant to section 69-A of the Information Technology (Procedure and Safeguards for Blocking of Access of Information by Public) Rules, 2009. MEITy blocked 59 mobile apps in June 2020, 47 in July 2020, 118 in September 2020, 43 in November 2020, 54 in February 2022, and 232 in February 2023. The first round of application bans in 2020 followed the Galwan Valley clash between India and China, with officials releasing a list of banned apps citing the sovereignty and integrity of India, data safety, and privacy concerns, including TikTok, WeChat and Shein. Fourteen communication apps were banned in May 2023, as they were allegedly being used by terrorists in Jammu and Kashmir; notably, these included open-source end-to-end communication platforms like Briar and Element.

There has also been an instance of planned features for applications being blocked under IT act, with MEITy issuing notice to WhatsApp's proposed usernames feature under the concern of facilitating impersonation and phishing.

In a response to question posed to MEITy by congress leader, Rahul Gandhi in March 2026, it informed the Lok Sabha that the government has blocked 652 mobile applications.

== Internet shutdowns ==
India reportedly has the highest number of internet shutdowns in the world—even higher than all other countries combined—with 771 shutdowns imposed between 2016 and 2023, according to Access Now. In 2018 the organisation reported that India accounted for 134 out of 196 documented Internet shutdowns globally.

The reasons for the shutdowns range from protests and political unrest to elections and exams. Internet shutdowns have often helped the government to throttle dissent and mass public gatherings. The think tank Indian Council for Research on International Economic Relations (ICRIER) estimated that the 16,315 hours of Internet shutdown between 2012 and 2017 cost the Indian economy approximately $3.04 billion. It was further estimated that in 2020, Internet shutdowns caused US$2.8 billion of damage to India's economy, harming businesses, teaching, and health care. In 2021, India recorded a total of 317.5 hours of Internet shutdown and 840 hours of bandwidth throttling, costing $582.8 million.

The majority of shutdowns were imposed on the erstwhile state of Jammu and Kashmir and later the union territory of the same name, which experienced the world's longest recorded Internet shutdown of 552 days during the 2019-2021 lockdown. Other shutdowns include a blackout in the state of Manipur during the 2023–2024 Manipur violence.

Instances of Internet Shutdowns 2012–2024
Year	As per internetshutdowns.in	As per Access Now
2012	3	
2013	5	
2014	6	
2015	14	
2016	31	30
2017	79	69
2018	136	134
2019	109	121
2020	132	108
2021	100	108
2022	77	85
2023	96	116
2024	60	84
2025	54	

=== Jammu and Kashmir ===
Before revocation of the autonomous status of Jammu and Kashmir, Internet services were shut down as part of curfew and complete communications blackout—including cable TV, landlines, and cellphones—on 4 August 2019. Internet was restored on 25 January 2020, when the government allowed people of Kashmir to access the Internet on 2G with whitelisted websites, but it was not until a year later in February 2021 that access to high-speed Internet was restored. This blockade and other frequent Internet shutdowns in the region have been termed digital apartheid by a local human rights group. Many students were affected during lockdown because they could not study properly in their online classes due to overly slow Internet speed. Broadband services were not restored until 5 March 2020 because of technical error preventing BSNL from doing so, at which point broadband was restored with full access but mobile Internet at only 2G.

The state government of Jammu and Kashmir shut down the Internet on 17–18 March 2014 in Jammu and Kashmir to stop separatists from addressing a United Nations Human Rights Council sideline event in Geneva, Switzerland via video link. After the high-profile death of Burhan Wani, a Kashmiri Islamist militant in Indian-administered Kashmir and the ensuing protests in July 2016, the government shut down the Internet in the area for five months.

On 26 April 2017, the state government also ordered the various ISPs operating in the valley to block access to 22 social networking websites for one month, charging among other things that they were "endangering public life and property and causing unrest/disharmony in the state". The order was passed by exercising powers conferred under the Indian Telegraph Act, 1885 which had technically become obsolete c. 2008 when the Government of India decided to stop all telegraph services in the country. As a result of this censorship, people living in the valley resorted to circumvention tactics in the form of using web proxies, VPNs among other things. The popularity of these tactics moved the government to block access to Android Play Store, among other services, for some time to prevent citizens from getting access to these services.

The banned services included widely used services such as Facebook, Twitter, and WhatsApp, but the list also included websites like QQ, Baidu, and Qzone, which were not used outside of mainland China. Xanga, a website on the list, shut down in 2013. The inclusion of these websites, mostly in Mandarin, had people concerned that the censorship was an attempt to suppress dissent by all means necessary, as opposed to the claim of "maintaining peace and harmony".

=== Rajasthan ===
In In September 2021, Internet services across Rajasthan were suspended to prevent cheating on the teachers recruitment exam. The next month the Internet was suspended in four districts of Rajasthan following violent protests and across Rajasthan in view of the Rajasthan Administrative services exam.

Internet services were also blocked in the state for days amid Hindu-Muslim religious tensions in the aftermath of the murder of Kanhaiya Lal in June 2022 to stop the spread of a video made by his killers.

=== Gujarat ===
The State Government of Gujarat shut down the Internet in Vadodara, from 27 to 30 September 2014 due to clashes between two communities, even though only the central government had the power to shut it down under the Information Technology Act, 2000, and in a declared state of emergency under Article 352 of the Constitution of India when freedom of speech and expression was suspended. No formal announcement was made about this shutdown by the city police or the ISPs.

When the Patidar reservation agitation turned violent on 25 August 2015, the Internet services on mobile phones and broadband were restricted as certain social media platforms such as WhatsApp and Facebook were blocked from 26 to 31 August 2015 across the state.

=== Nagaland ===
The State Government of Nagaland shut down the Internet for the entire state on 7 March 2015 for 48 hours due to the mob lynching of a man.

Both SMS and Internet/data services were suspended in the state from 30 January to 20 February 2017 after being blocked for 20 days that had been initiated to prevent spread of violence in the state. This situation arose when two Naga tribal bodies served a three-day ultimatum to Zeliang, an acronym for three distinct but related Naga tribes, to step down following the government's decision to hold local body elections with 33% reservation for women in 12 towns across the state and the death of two persons in clashes between police and protestors at Dimapur, Nagaland's commercial hub, on the night of 31 January 2017.

=== Manipur ===
The State Government of Manipur shut down the Internet of some service providers that provided Internet through mobile technology 2G/3G/4G in the state from the evening of 1 September to the afternoon of 8 September 2015, due to agitation over the passing of three bills. Police and protesters clashed in different areas of the Churachandpur district as mobs went on a rampage attacking residences of ministers, members of the Legislative Assembly (MLAs), and members of Parliament (MPs).

Internet shutdowns were again imposed in the state during the 2023–2024 Manipur violence, when ethnic clashes between communities led the state government to suspend mobile Internet services across large parts of Manipur for several months. Authorities stated that the shutdown was intended to prevent the spread of rumours, misinformation, and inflammatory content on social media that could escalate violence.

The prolonged shutdown in Manipur during 2023 was widely reported to be among the longest internet restrictions imposed in the world that year, drawing criticism from digital rights groups and raising debates over the balance between security concerns and access to communication services.

The government ordered the respective deputy commissioner (DC) to shut down mobile data service in Imphal West and Imphal East district from 17 December 2016 till further order. The next day, the Home Department of the Government of Manipur was ordered to shut down all mobile data services and SMSs in the state from 10:00 on 18 December to 10:00 on 30 December 2016.

The government ordered all forms of telecom services except voice calls suspended in Manipur for five days, taking effect from the night of 19 July 2018 to prevent anti-national and anti-social messages on social media. Raghumani Singh, Special Secretary (Home) – Manipur, said in an order issued in the governor's name that the prohibition was imposed under Rule II of the Temporary Suspension of Telecom Services (Public Emergency or Public Safety) Rules, 2017.

A second time in 2018, the government ordered shutdown of mobile data services in Manipur for five days, taking effect from 21 September 2018. Again the prohibition was imposed under Rule II of the Temporary Suspension of Telecom Services (Public Emergency or Public Safety) Rules, 2017. An order issued by Special Secretary (Home) – Manipur Singh said the step was taken to prevent spread of rumours, "which might have serious repercussion for the law and order situation in the entire state of Manipur".

For the third time, the state government ordered a shutdown of mobile data services in Manipur for five days under the leadership of Chief Minister N. Biren Singh in 2019, amidst protests against the Citizenship (Amendment) Bill that took effect at midnight of 11 February 2019. District Magistrate for Imphal West Naorem Praveen Singh also barred cable news channels from "transmission of agitation or protest" indefinitely "until further orders", under section 19 of the Cable Television Networks (Regulation) Act, 1995, prohibiting transmission of agitation or protests that might lead to violence.

Internet and mobile data services were restored after an order in the name of the governor, issued by Raghumani Singh, Special Secretary (Home) – Manipur on 13 February 2019. The CAB was not tabled on Rajya Sabha, as the law and order situation improved and came back to normalcy.

On 16 March 2020, the Government of Manipur issued an order, signed by H. Gyan Prakash in the name of the governor, to suspend Internet services for three days to avoid usage of social media networks, which might lead to escalation of an incident between two communities at Chasad Village in the Kamjong district. Internet services were restored the next day, reducing the period of suspension to one day.

On 6 August 2022, the Government of Manipur again issued an order, signed by H. Gyan Prakash in the name of the governor, to suspend Internet mobile services for five days to avoid usage of social media networks, which might lead to escalation of the tense situation in Manipur. Three days later, the Government of Manipur issued an order relaxing the suspension, signed by H. Gyan Prakash, in view of positive developments.

=== Andhra Pradesh ===
The State Government of Andhra Pradesh shut down the Internet in Amalapuram, Andhra Pradesh on 25 May 2022, due to violent protests regarding the name change of the Konaseema district, where Amalapuram is located.

== Protests ==
=== Save Your Voice campaign ===
Save Your Voice, a movement against Internet censorship in India, was founded by cartoonist Aseem Trivedi and journalist Alok Dixit in January 2012. The movement opposes the Information Technology Act of India and demands democratic rules for the governance of the Internet. The campaign targets rules framed under the Information Technology Act, 2000.

=== Anonymous India ===
Since 3 May 2012, a number of websites including Vimeo, The Pirate Bay, Torrentz and other torrent sites were blocked by Reliance Communications, on orders from the Department of Telecom, without any stated reasons or prior warnings. On 26 May, Anonymous India (AnonOpsIndia), a branch of the hacktivist group Anonymous launched a protest against the block which included its Twitter handle @OpIndia_Revenge, by hacking DNS servers of Reliance Communications and preventing direct access to Twitter, Facebook, and many other websites in India. They went on to warn the government to restore all the blocked websites by 9 June 2012, and planned nationwide protests on the same date. After this hack, Anonymous also released a list of websites that had been blocked by Reliance without any orders from the government. In November 2012, Anonymous India defaced Indian Telecom Minister Kapil Sibal's constituency website in protest against an amendment to the Information Technology Act and the recent crackdown on netizens for comments posted online.

The website of Bharat Sanchar Nigam Limited's (BSNL), www.bsnl.co.in, was hacked by Anonymous India on 13 December 2012. They defaced the website with a picture stating that they were protesting against section 66A of the IT Act and in support of cartoonist Aseem Trivedi and journalist Alok Dixit. The duo went on a hunger striker to protest against section 66A.

== See also ==
- Censorship in India
- Mass surveillance in India
- Internet blackout
- Internet police
- Shreya Singhal v. Union of India
- Digital Personal Data Protection Act, 2023
- Digital Personal Data Protection Rules, 2025
