= Facebook Revolution =

Facebook Revolution may refer to different revolutions and protests, which were coordinated using Facebook:

- 2009 Iranian presidential election protests, following the 2009 Iranian presidential election against the disputed victory of Iranian President Mahmoud Ahmadinejad
- Media curbs and usage of social networking sites in Kashmir, India, protests against the "Bloody Summer" of 2010
- Egyptian revolution of 2011, overthrowing President Hosni Mubarak
- Tunisian Revolution, overthrowing President Zine El Abidine Ben Ali, 2011
- 2013 protests in Brazil, protests in Brazil against increases in public transportation fare, in 2013
- Euromaidan, a wave of demonstrations and civil unrest in Ukraine, 2013
- 2014 Romanian presidential election, protests over the presidential elections in November 2014
- 2014 Hong Kong protests or "Umbrella Revolution", a series of sit-in street demonstrations protesting proposed reforms to the Hong Kong electoral system
- 2017 pro-jallikattu protests, India, against the Supreme Court's order to ban a traditional Tamil bull-taming sport
- 2021 storming of the United States Capitol, on January 6, 2021, rioters supporting United States President Donald Trump's attempts to overturn the 2020 presidential election
