= Censorship in India =

Censorship in India has taken various forms throughout its history. Although de jure the Constitution of India guarantees freedom of expression, de facto there are various restrictions on content, with an official view towards "maintaining communal and religious harmony", given the history of communal tension in the nation. According to the Information Technology Rules 2011, objectionable content includes anything that "threatens the unity, integrity, defense, security or sovereignty of India, friendly relations with foreign states or public order". While watching, listening, or possessing pornographic materials is generally legal, distribution of such materials is strictly banned.

== Censorship by medium ==
=== Press ===
According to the World Press Freedom Index (WPFI), a global analysis published by French NGO Reporters Without Borders (RSF), India's press freedom ranking has been steadily dropping, from 140 out of 179 countries in 2019, to 161 out of 180 countries in 2023, classifying press freedom in India as being in a "serious" situation. In 2024, the annual Freedom in the World report by American non-profit, Freedom House, gave India an overall score of 66 out of 100, corresponding to a status of "partially free" which is down from 77 out of 100 in 2017 corresponding to status of "free", with a Civil Liberties rating of 33 out of 60 down from 42 out of 60 in 2017, and a score of 2 out of 4 for the specific question "Are there free and independent media?". The analysis specifically noted that this did not include conditions in Indian Kashmir, which was analyzed separately and scored a much lower overall score of 26 out of 100 (status "not free"), with a Civil Liberties rating of 20 out of 60.

India's global index rank has declined for several reasons, such as targeting of journalists including physical abuse, intimidation, prejudice and murder, and restrictions imposed on news media, particularly censorship in Kashmir and conflict in Jammu and Kashmir which has been a subject of dispute between India and Pakistan.

=== Internet ===
In 2008, in the face of heightened public sentiment in prioritizing response to security threats following Mumbai terror attacks, amendment to the Information Technology Act (IT Act), 2000 was passed, reinforcing the government's power to block Internet sites and content, and criminalized sending messages deemed inflammatory or offensive. The enforcement of content blocking is carried out through IT rules and guidelines issued by the Ministry of Electronics and Information Technology (MEITy) and Ministry of Information Broadcasting (MIB) while policies governing internet security are issued through Indian Computer Emergency Response Team (CERT-IN).

Under the Narendra Modi administration, blocking requests rapidly increased from 6,000 requests annually in January 2018 to 12,600 in 2024. Following the creation of Sahyog portal by Ministry of Home Affairs in October 2024, to automate sending of takedown requests under Section 79(3)(b) of the IT Act, the number of takedown requests nearly doubled again within a single year to 24,300 in 2025. Blocking orders are criticized for increasingly targeted criticisms or parodies of Modi or the Hindutva ideology of the ruling BJP with this resulting in accounts being withheld in some cases. The administration is criticized for establishing legislative provisions granting the MEITy and the Ministry of Information Broadcasting (MIB) extraordinary powers to enforce censorship. Notable changes in rules are 2021 amendment of IT rules, forcing takedown compliance by mandating Indian resident compliance officers liable for non-compliance with jail-term or fine, which has been criticized and unsuccessfully challenged by Twitter, and the 2026 amendment of IT rules, reducing takedown compliance from 36 hours to 3 hours, the shortest takedown timeline prescribed by any government which has caused Meta which receives majority takedown notices in India to implement an API to automatically takedown content without manual review, with the US Trade representative (USTR) criticizing the move as the imposition of an impractical compliance deadline and noting an increased quantity of politically motivated takedown requests.

=== Film ===
The Central Board of Film Certification (CBFC), which is the film-regulating agency in India, orders directors to remove anything that it deems to be offensive, including sex, nudity, violence or subjects considered politically subversive. Censorship of films is governed by The Cinematograph Act, 1952 and the associated rules and guidelines in line with section 5B of the act.

a film shall not be certified for public exhibition, if, in the opinion of the authority competent to grant the certificate, the film or any part of it is against the interests of the sovereignty and integrity of India, the security of the States, friendly relations with foreign States, public order, decency or morality or involves defamation or contempt of court or is likely to incite the commission of any offence.

— Section 5B, The Cinematograph Act, 1952

The current classifications of films in India are as follows:

- अ / U – unrestricted public exhibition;
- UA 7+ – Unrestricted public exhibition, but with parental guidance for children below the age of 7 years and appropriate above the age of seven;
- UA 13+ – Unrestricted public exhibition, but with parental guidance for children below the age of 13 years;
- UA 16+ – Unrestricted public exhibition, but with parental guidance for children below the age of 16 years;
- व / A – public exhibition restricted to adults 18 years of age and older only;
- S – public exhibition restricted to members of a profession or a class of persons (e.g. doctors etc.)—very rare.

The Central Board of Film Certification allows release of certain films with sexual content (labelled A-rated), which are to be shown only in restricted spaces, and are to be viewed only by people of age 18 and above.

Film makers have criticized CBFC as enforcing a "censorship raj" (lit. 'Censorship rule') for applying arbitrary censorship and demanding many cuts to films touching on caste, mythology, politics, and sensitive topics. The Cinematograph Act of 1952, is also criticized as outdated. In 2016, the Shyam Benegal Committee was formed to lay down norms of film certification, with recommendation of procedures and guidelines for CBFC's operation. It submitted recommendations including emphasizing certification over censorship, more categories of certification, limited function of the board to reduce 'reign of terror', shifting advisory panel from Ministry of Information Broadcasting to members selected by NFDC, FFSI, FFI, NCPCR and NCW with 50% representation of women, and permitting the board to re-certify movies. As of 2026, the Shyam Benegal reforms have not been considered into forming legislature.

Filmmakers have reported a more positive experience with the board's Film Certification Appellate Tribunal (FCAT) where filmmakers can appeal decisions of the censor board in front of a judiciary panel. The FCAT which had been historically more progressive than CBFC and responsible to overturning CBFC decisions on many occasions, was abolished in 2021 under the Tribunal Reforms Ordinance, 2021 which has been widely criticized for enabling more censorship in film industry.

=== Television ===
The Cable Television Act, 1995, gave the government powers of censorship of cable television and enforced by Cable Television Network rules which require cable channels to obey Programme code, a list of censorship requirements that has been criticized for being vaguely worded, and monitored by Ministry of Information Broadcasting (MIB). In 2015, under the Narendra Modi administration, changes to the Programme code was implemented that limits coverage of terror related incidents to "periodic live briefing by an officer designated by the government” due to which NDTV was blacked out during its coverage of 2016 Pathankot attack.

=== Music ===
There is no authority in India for censorship of music, however, liability rests on artists and producers to comply with all Indian laws and sometimes face legal troubles for their content such as takedown of "Volume 1" by Honey Singh and Badshah for misogynistic lyrics by the Delhi High Court under law against derogatory public acts and film song, "Sarke Chunar" for obscene content by the CBFC, the certification body for films. Since music is otherwise self-regulated, there have been instances of organizations imposing bans on songs such as All India Radio banning Bollywood songs in 1952 for 'ruining younger generation' and Indian motion picture producers' association banning Pakistan-based artists from participation in their films following 2016 Uri attack.

=== Theater ===
The Dramatic Performances Act (DPA), introduced in 1876 during British colonial rule gave regulatory mechanism for theaters with censorship of plays considered seditious, obscene or against public interest, through which anti-government sentiments were kept in check. Post independence, it continued to be in effect however its implementation differs for each states. For example, Punjab and Rajasthan have legislation for regulating plays, however West Bengal and Maharashtra rely on general public order and obscenity provisions to enforce regulation on plays.

=== Maps ===
In 1961, it was criminalized in India to question the territorial integrity of frontiers of India in a manner which is, or is likely to be, prejudicial to the interests of the safety or security of India. India’s government requires that all maps in publications circulated in India reflect its claim to the entire region of Kashmir, which is disputed by Pakistan, and regardless of current lines of control. Publications that do not conform are seized by the authorities and issues can end up being destroyed.

=== Books ===
Banning of books was enforced through Section 95 of Code of Criminal Procedure or its equivalent, Section 98 of Bharatiya Nyaya Sanhita since 2024, which provides state governments the authority to ban print media based on application of criminal laws against promoting public disorder and obscenity.

== See also ==
- Moral police
- Pornography laws in India
- Freedom of expression in India
- Freedom of the press in India
- Mass surveillance in India
- NCERT textbook controversies
- Central Board of Film Certification
- Ethical Code for Digital News Websites
- Freedom of the press in British India
