= Save Your Voice =

- Founded: 2012
- Type: People's Movement
- Purpose: Anti Censorship
- Location: New Delhi, India
- Region served: India
- Members: More than 5,000

Save Your Voice is a movement against internet censorship in India. It was founded by cartoonist Aseem Trivedi, journalist Alok Dixit, socialist Arpit Gupta and Chirag Joshi in January 2012. The movement was initially named "Raise Your Voice", before it was renamed. The movement started from Ujjain in Madhya Pradesh, under the frontier-ship of the movement's four founders; with a "Langda March" at Ujjain. The movement opposes the Information Technology Act of India and demands democratic rules for the governance of Internet. The campaign is targeted at the rules framed under the Information Technology Act, 2000.

== Langda March or Disability Parade ==
The "Langda March" was an eye-catching protest against internet censorship. Protestors "disabled themselves" by bandaging their hands and feet, appearing handicapped. The crowd of "handicaps" marched across the roads in Ujjain, Meerut, Bangalore and Chennai.

== Sibal's Day Campaign ==
Save Your Voice celebrated April Fool's Day with Kapil Sibal, the IT Minister of India and named it as "Sibal's Day". This was a direct attack on the minister who had advocated pre-censorship for the content on the social media. Save Your Voice staged demonstrations at prominent locations like the Indian Parliament, India Gate, Jantar Mantar and the IT ministry of India with dummies of Kapil Sibal, who received postcards, messages and even garlands from passersby and supporters. The goal of this campaign was to rally public support in defense of free speech on the Internet.

== Freedom in the Cage ==
Freedom in the cage was a creative protest by Save Your Voice which got a huge public attention in New Delhi with demonstrators symbolically locked in cages to help raise awareness about the problem of web censorship in India. Artists, Journalists and bloggers had caged themselves to give the message to the government that artistes inside a cage playing the guitar or painting a canvas was equal to the government's IT rules that have "caged" the freedom of the people granted by the Constitution of India. The motive behind the protest was to explain that the newly notified Information Technology (Intermediaries Guidelines) Rules-2011 prescribing principles to be observed by the Internet companies was unconstitutional as it provided for a system of censorship by private parties, adversely affected the right of privacy, would hamper the growth of the Internet and slow down economic growth in the process and limit the growth of IT-related services and industries in particular.

=== Freedom Fast ===
Save Your Voice supported the annulment motion brought by the MP P Rajeev and to put pressure on the government, two of the movement's campaigners, the cartoonist Aseem Trivedi and journalist Alok Dixit started a hunger strike. People from various streams and in favour of this cause have visited the campaigning activists at Jantar Mantar, and helped to keep their motive intact. Arvind Gaur, Director of Asmita Theatre (New Delhi) also joined them with his associates and assured that he would extend his support for the fight for 'Freedom of Speech & Expression' in a full-fledged manner. The seven day long hunger strike was ended when both were forced to end a hunger strike they began on 2 May. Their health had deteriorated considerably and they were hospitalised. The annulment motion in the Rajya Sabha could not be passed and India joined the league of dictator nations where internet is not free. However, the hunger strike successfully highlighted the issue in the global media.

=== Occupy India ===
The protest has resulted in access being denied to a host of websites that carry illegal copies of films and songs among other legal content, including isohunt.com and pastebin.com. The website of one of the Save Your Voice members, Trivedi, was also blocked by BigRock and against which the members protested and campaigned throughout India. "The government is bringing censorship through the back door and we will oppose it," says Alok in one of his interviews with The Asian Age. To register their protest, campaigners have also hacked the website of state-run telecom provider MTNL and pasted the logo of the Anonymous group, the mask of 17th century British revolutionary Guy Fawkes, on mtnl.net.in. MTNL's corporate website could not be accessed for over four hours, following the attack, but its individual city-specific websites (for Delhi and Mumbai) remained unaffected.

=== Arrest of cartoonist Aseem Trivedi ===
Police in Maharashtra arrested Aseem Trivedi, a political cartoonist and the co-founder of the Save Your Voice campaign, on Saturday, 9 September 2012. He faced charges of sedition, violating Internet security laws, and insulting national honour for publishing cartoons mocking national symbols and criticising corruption on his website, Cartoons Against Corruption. After Trivedi's arrest, Save Your Voice ran a nationwide campaign against the arrest of the cartoonist. The campaign received massive public support from civil society groups and artisan communities across borders. Mahesh Bhatt, a prominent Bollywood figure and film director, joined the press conference at Mumabi Press Club with Save Your Voice co-founder Alok Dixit supporting Trivedi's case. Dixit has also mediated between the Home Minister RR Patil and Trivedi when Trivedi refused to take bail.

== Hunger strike against Sec 66A of IT Act ==
Save Your Voice initiated an indefinite hunger strike by Aseem Trivedi and Alok Dixit against IT Act Section-66A at Jantar Mantar on 8 December 2012, following various arrests of civilians expressing their views on social networking sites. This got a bigger public attention when activist turned politician Arvind Kejriwal joined this campaign and promised to make it a nationwide agenda. Both ended the fast after Arvind Kejriwal requested him not to waste his life and rather work towards 'uprooting the UPA government'.

=== Cause ===
Section 66A's misuse flows from its draconian nature and imprecise terminology. People can face up to three years of prison for electronic communications that "grossly" offend or cause "annoyance or inconvenience", or, in case of information known to be false, cause "danger, obstruction, insult, injury, criminal intimidation, enmity, hatred, or ill will". Together, this amounts to gagging citizens in a day and age the internet's an indispensable everyday platform for exchange of news and views. Two girls Shaheen Dhada and Renu Srinivasan were arrested over a Facebook post, under sec 66 A, criticising the bandh like situation in Mumbai after Shiv Sena supremo Bal Thackeray's death. Another boy, under the same act, was arrested within a week for posting "vulgar" comments against MNS chief Raj Thackeray and the people of Maharashtra on the social networking site. The arrests of Jadavpur University professor Ambikesh Mahapatra for circulating a cartoon lampooning West Bengal's Chief Minister Mamata Banerjee, cartoonist Aseem Trivedi and businessman Ravi Srinivasan for tweets against Union Finance Minister P. Chidambaram's son Karti Chidambaram, have also sparked popular anger among civil societies.

The movement specified eight particular reasons for which the indefinite hunger strike was commenced. The reasons include ambiguity in the purpose of the section, lack of control over cyber harassment, inequality in legal implementation, excessive strictness, misuse for vendetta, comparatively harsh magnitudes of punishments, curb on harmless speech and the section's being open to abuse. The protest saw Aseem Trivedi hold a banner in his hand stating "I am a big supporter of freedom of speech, freedom of expression, freedom of thoughts."

== See also ==
- Internet censorship in India
- Cartoons Against Corruption
- The Information Technology Act, 2000
- Aseem Trivedi
