= Censorship in Kashmir =

Censorship in Kashmir involves the censorship of both news media and social media as part of the Kashmir conflict.

According to the Software Freedom Law Center, the internet in Kashmir was blocked at least 31 times from 2012 to 2016.

== 2010 protest censorship ==
A protest reportedly took place in the Indian Administered Kashmir against the summer of 2010, when 15 people were killed in three weeks by the Indian Armed Forces. Army's help was sought to restore law and order after protests by people as Government virtually banned the media in the Valley by imposing severe restrictions on journalists. The revolution was allegedly carried out by youth who disseminated information to the outer world in view of the gagging of media, newspapers and SMS services.

== July 2016 media outlet ban ==
The ban of media in 2016 in Kashmir began 10 days after the killing of Burhan Wani, a popular rebel group leader in Kashmir. Protests against the killing of Wani broke out in the streets as young Kashmiris attacked the police. Wani was a social-media-savvy insurgent who affected the lives of the majority of Kashmiris, requesting them to follow his path through social media and newspaper posts. These protests led to more than 33 deaths and hundreds being severely injured. The riots and protests got so unruly that the government decided to impose serious actions on the media while they struggled to bring the situation under control. The government decided to shut down cable TV operators and private cellphone services, as well as banning daily newspapers. The government called this an ‘information blockade’ as they believed that young and emotion lot of people out on the streets that are surcharged by certain media publications. The newspapers refrain from publishing content deemed inappropriate by the government but this was the first time there was a ban imposed on the newspapers. Police officials and security forces raided printing presses and seized copies of newspapers. The ban lasted for over a week in the state of Jammu and Kashmir.

== April 2017 social media ban ==
In April 2017, the authorities in Indian administered Kashmir (IAK) banned several social media sites after they believed that they were being used as a tool to indulge violence and terrorism amongst the youths by anti-national elements. The government of IAK regularly blocked internet connections but this was the first time such a step was taken on social media. Over the past five years, the government blocked internet signals over 28 times and in 2016, the internet connection was blocked for about five months. The social media sites and apps blocked included WhatsApp, Snapchat, Facebook, Twitter, WeChat, Skype, Pinterest, and Vine. The government described this ban as an action to control the political space in IAK. Due to this ban, riots broke down in certain IAK regions. The protests started in the southern district of Pulwama by certain ringleaders. Hundreds of students have taken it to the streets, some chanting antinational slogans while others attacking the police using rocks.

== Censorship on Facebook ==
Several newspapers and magazines, such as Free Press Kashmir, Wande Magazine, and Lost Kashmir History, have been censored on Facebook. On 20 August 2023, News outlet The Kashmir Walla's facebook account was removed.

== Censorship on X ==
Independent news outlet, The Kashmir walla's X (formerly twitter) account was censored, on 20 August 2023

== 2019-20 Jammu and Kashmir lockdown ==
On August 5, 2019, a security lockdown and communications blackout was imposed to prevent protests during which thousands of people, mostly young men, have been illegally detained in Jammu and Kashmir.

The lockdown started on 5 August 2019 following Revocation of the special status of Jammu and Kashmir via scrapping of the Article 370 of the Constitution of India, Article 35A of the Constitution of India and the introduction of Jammu and Kashmir Reorganisation Act, 2019. Since 5 August, no foreign journalists have been granted permission from the Indian government to report in Kashmir.

According to a September 6 report of the Indian government, nearly 4,000 people have been arrested and detained in the disputed region. Among those arrested were more than 200 politicians, including two former chief ministers of Jammu and Kashmir (J&K), along with more than 100 leaders and activists from All Parties Hurriyat Conference.

The lockdown ended with the resumption of all communication services, allowing 4G and 3G Internet services, in early February 2021.

== Censorship on internet ==
Censorship on internet refers to the restrictions on telecommunication such as broadband as well as mobile internet imposed by the government of India or state administration. In August 2019, the Government of India barred all broadband as well as mobile internet services in the region to prevent the deliberately fabricated falsehood on social media. In January 2020, 2G internet was resumed with no access to social media. Although some cases of COVID-19 infection have been confirmed in the region, authorities continued to enforce the 4G internet ban, preventing people from getting important information about the COVID-19 pandemic and its safety tips. Medical institutions has described 4G ban a risk factor for COVID-19 deaths in J&K, as the information about WHO's guideline on testing and its countermeasures remained inaccessible in the region. Amnesty International also urged government to restore 4G internet in critical situation of pandemic disease. Doctors, according to news media, are not able to deal the coronavirus due to non-availability of 4G internet and lack of significant information available online. In April - May 2020, Supreme Court of India heard a batch of writ petitions challenging the ban on 4G internet services. J&K administration opposed the plea stating that "the right to access the internet is not a fundamental right". On 11 May 2020, Supreme Court disposed of these petitions refusing the request for restoration of 4G internet services. Court, however, constituted a special committee composed of senior bureaucrats to look into the issue. The committee ironically was composed of the bureaucrats having a major hand in imposing the censorship. High-speed cellular internet has been restored across the UT since February 2021.
