= Aseem Trivedi =

Indian political cartoonist and activist (born 1987)

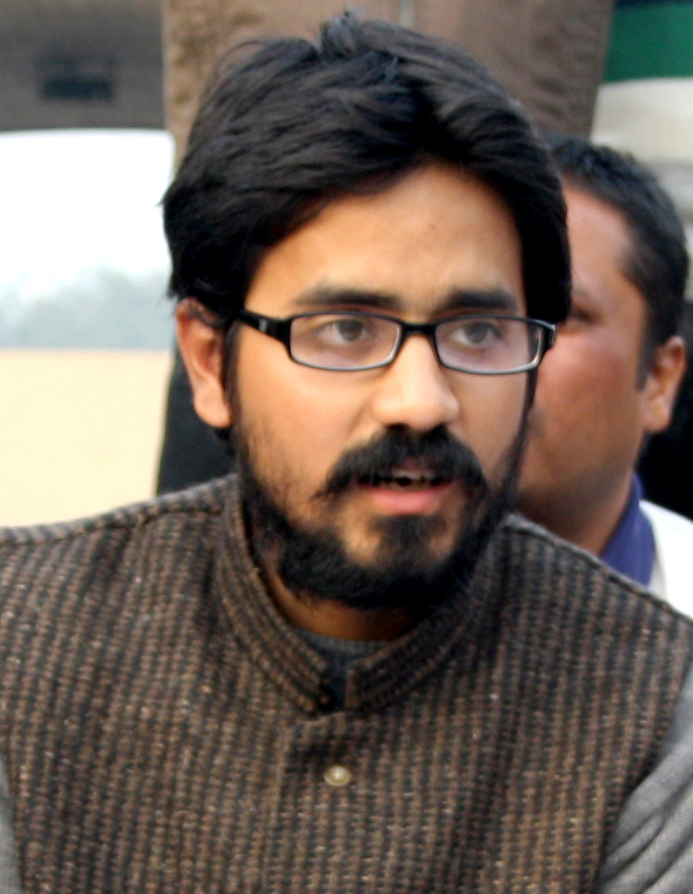
- Trivedi at Raj Ghat, Delhi protesting on internet censorship
- Born: 17 February 1987 (age 39); Shuklaganj, Uttar Pradesh, India
- Known for: Political cartoon, Activism
- Notable work: Social Work
- Movement: India Against Corruption, Save Your Voice
- Awards: Courage in Editorial Cartooning (2012)
- Website: aseemtrivedi.in

Aseem Trivedi (born 17 February 1987) is an Indian political cartoonist and activist, known for his anti corruption campaign Cartoons Against Corruption. He is a founder member of Save Your Voice, a movement against internet censorship in India. He is the recipient of "Courage in Editorial Cartooning Award 2012" of US based Cartoonists Rights Network International.

== Early life ==
Aseem Trivedi was born on 17 February 1987 in Shuklaganj at Unnao district of Uttar Pradesh State in India. He studied in Saraswati Vidya Mandir until 12th standard. He started his career as a freelance cartoonist and worked for several Hindi language newspapers and magazines.

== Cartoons against corruption ==
In 2011, a nationwide anti corruption movement India Against Corruption gathered pace in India. Aseem Trivedi started a cartoon based campaign, Cartoons Against Corruption to support the movement. He launched a website www.cartoonsagainstcorruption.com and displayed his cartoons in the MMRDA ground, Mumbai during the hunger strike of Anna Hazare.

== Ban on the website ==
The website was banned by Mumbai Crime Branch for displaying "defamatory and derogatory cartoons" in Dec, 2011. Following his website's ban, he uploaded his cartoons to a new blog.

== Fight against internet censorship ==
After the ban on his website, Aseem Trivedi along with his friend Alok Dixit started Save Your Voice, a campaign for internet freedom. Through the creative protests in several cities, Save Your Voice, initiated a debate over internet freedom in India. The campaign was targeted at the draconian rules framed under the Information Technology Act, 2000.

== Hunger Strike ==
Aseem Trivedi went on an indefinite hunger strike for internet freedom at Jantar Mantar in May 2012, New Delhi. The motive of the hunger strike was to request political parties to support the annulment motion against the Intermediary Guideline Rules of the Information Technology Act 2011 of India.

== Charges and allegations ==
One of Trivedi's cartoons showed the four lions that form Ashoka Chakra, India's national symbol, replaced by four wolves and the national slogan "truth shall prevail" replaced by "corruption shall prevail." Another cartoon showed Parliament as the "national toilet". He sketched a woman as "Mother India" being assaulted by a politician and a bureaucrat. A caption above this cartoon reads "gang rape of Mother India".

He faced serious allegations of insulting national emblem, Parliament, flag and constitution through his cartoons. He was charged with sedition IPC 124A, Section 66A of IT act and National Emblem Act 1971 . The case against him was filed in a Mumbai court by a lawyer, who said the pictures mocked national symbols. Trivedi was also charged with posting seditious and obscene content on his website.

== Jail ==
He was arrested in Mumbai on 9 September 2012 on charges of sedition, related to the content of his work. He was granted bail with a personal bond of Rs. 5000 on the basis of an independent petition by a lawyer, who also asked the court to remove the accusations of sedition.

Sedition charges were dropped by the government in October 2012. Section 66A of IT Act was scrapped by Supreme Court of India in March 2015.

== Awards ==
He has been announced as the 2012 recipient of the "Courage in Editorial Cartooning Award" of Virginia based Cartoonists Rights Network International. He is sharing the award with Syrian cartoonist Ali Ferzat. Indian Affairs founded by Satya Brahma in its 6th Annual India Leadership Conclave 2015 awarded Trivedi as "Cartoonist of the year 2015".

He was also nominated for the Freedom of Expression Awards 2013 in Arts category by UK based group Index on Censorship.

== Reality television ==
As contestant

Year	Show	Standing
2012	Bigg Boss 6	17th place Evicted Day 27

== See also ==
- India Against Corruption
- Cartoons Against Corruption
- Save Your Voice
- Internet censorship in India
