= Section 147 of the Bharatiya Nyaya Sanhita =

Section 147 of the Bharatiya Nyaya Sanhita (BNS) is a provision in the new criminal code of India that addresses the offense of waging war against the Government of India, which is classified under the BNS as a form of treason. It replaces the former Section 124A of the Indian Penal Code (IPC), which dealt with sedition. While the IPC provision targeted acts that "excites or attempts to excite disaffection towards the Government established by law in India," Section 147 of the BNS focuses on acts of war.

== Provisions ==
=== Section 147 ===
Section 147 of Bharatiya Nyaya Sanhita, states:

Whoever wages war against the Government of India, or attempts to wage such war, or abets the waging of such war, shall be punished with death, or imprisonment for life and shall also be liable to fine.

— Section 147, Bharatiya Nyaya Sanhita

The words "excites or attempts to excite disaffection towards, the Government established by law in India" have been included, instead of the original provision of Section 124A of Indian Penal Code "excites or attempts to excite disaffection towards, the Government established by law in India". Current Home Minister Amit Shah said "Instead of Rajdroh, we have introduced Deshdroh. We are a free country now. Nobody will have to go to jail for criticising individuals. But no one can speak against the country. I believe those who speak against the country should go to jail." He also added "We have talked about intent also behind the Deshdroh offence. What was the intent behind saying or doing anything under this provision is important to look at. Whether the intent is to act against the country or the criticism of the government. Criticism of the Government is not an offence."

=== Section 152 ===
Section 152 of Bharatiya Nyaya Sanhita, states:

Whoever, purposely or knowingly, by words, either spoken or written, or by signs, or by visible representation, or by electronic communication or by use of financial mean, or otherwise, excites or attempts to excite, secession or armed rebellion or subversive activities, or encourages feelings of separatist activities or endangers sovereignty or unity and integrity of India; or indulges in or commits any such act shall be punished with imprisonment for life or with imprisonment which may extend to seven years, and shall also be liable to fine.

— Section 152, Bharatiya Nyaya Sanhita

This section lays down punishment for person who "excites or attempts to excite" armed rebellion, subversive activities, separatist activities or endangers sovereignty, unity and integrity of India. This section of the Bharatiya Nyaya Sanhita act has been criticized for being too vague as the term "subversive activities" is not defined anywhere in the act itself.

== See also ==
- Bharatiya Nyaya Sanhita
- Sedition in India
- Treason
- Indian Penal Code
