= Crimes (Repeal of Seditious Offences) Amendment Act 2007 =

Act of Parliament in New Zealand

New Zealand Parliament
- Royal assent: 30 October 2007
- Commenced: 1 January 2008

Legislative history
- Introduced by: Mark Burton
- Passed: 24 October 2007
- Status: Current legislation

The Crimes (Repeal of Seditious Offences) Amendment Act 2007 is an Act of Parliament passed in New Zealand in 2007. It removed the crime of sedition from the New Zealand statute book.

== Background ==
While outlawed by the Crimes Act 1961, the crime of sedition had fallen into disuse in New Zealand, with the last prosecutions having occurred in the 1930s. The law was revived in 2004, after political activist Tim Selwyn threw an axe through the window of Prime Minister Helen Clark's electorate office. Selwyn was subsequently charged with seditious conspiracy, and convicted in July 2006. The case, and the police's subsequent use of the sedition law to punish trivial offences, caused widespread concern and prompted calls for the law to be repealed. The government had already asked the Law Commission to review the law in late 2006, and on 5 April 2007 it released its report formally recommending that the law be repealed. A coalition of four minor parties – ACT New Zealand, the Greens, the Māori Party and United Future – who collectively held a balance of power in Parliament, jointly called for repeal. On 7 May 2007 the government responded, announcing its intention to repeal the law.

== Introduction and passage ==
The Crimes (Repeal of Seditious Offences) Amendment Bill was introduced to Parliament on 8 June 2007. It was given its first reading on 14 and 19 June, and passed unanimously. On 24 August, the Justice and Electoral Select Committee recommended it proceed without amendment. Despite unanimous support during its early stages, the bill was opposed during its second and third readings by the New Zealand First Party, who believed that some version of the law was necessary to fight terrorism. The bill passed its third reading 114 – 7 on 24 October 2007, and sedition ceased to be a crime in New Zealand on 1 January 2008.
