= Section 124A of the Indian Penal Code =

Law on the punishment for sedition

Section 124A of the Indian Penal Code lays down the punishment for sedition. The Indian Penal Code was enacted in 1860, under the British Raj. Section 124A forms part of Chapter VI of the Code which deals with offences against the state. Chapter VI comprises sections from 121 to 130, wherein sections 121A and 124A were introduced in 1870. The then British government of India feared that the Khilafat movement on the Indian subcontinent would wage a war against them. Particularly after the successful suppression of Wahabi/Waliullah Movement, the need was felt for such a law. Throughout the Raj, the section was used to suppress political dissent in favour of independence, including Lokmanya Tilak and Mahatma Gandhi, both of whom were found guilty and imprisoned.

The section kept drawing criticism in independent India as well for being a hindrance to free speech. Sedition was made a cognisable offence for the first time in history in India, during the tenure of PM Indira Gandhi in 1973, that is, arrest without a police warrant was now permissible. In 1962 the Supreme Court of India interpreted the section to apply only if there is, say, "incitement to violence" or "overthrowing a democratically elected government through violent means".

As of 11 May 2022, This law has been put on temporary hold by Supreme Court of India citing re-examination. In December 2023, Home Minister Amit Shah introduces the criminal law into the parliament and said sedition has been turned into treason. As per the proposed laws, he stated that criticism of the government is fully permissible, and any activity will be considered treason only if it is intended against the integrity, sovereignty, and unity of the nation.

== Text ==
Section 124A. Sedition

Whoever, by words, either spoken or written, or by signs, or by visible representation, or otherwise, brings or attempts to bring into hatred or contempt, or excites or attempts to excite disaffection towards, the Government established by law in India, shall be punished with imprisonment for life, to which fine may be added, or with imprisonment which may extend to three years, to which fine may be added, or with fine.

- Explanation 1.—The expression “disaffection” includes disloyalty and all feelings of enmity.
- Explanation 2.—Comments expressing disapprobation of the measures of the Government to obtain their alteration by lawful means, without exciting or attempting to excite hatred, contempt, or disaffection, do not constitute an offence under this section.
- Explanation 3.—Comments expressing disapprobation of the administrative or other action of the Government without exciting or attempting to excite hatred, contempt, or disaffection, do not constitute an offence under this section.

== Development and current status ==
Historical text (1870)

Section 124A. Exciting disaffection Whoever by words, either spoken or intended to be read, or by signs, or by visible representation, or otherwise, excites, or attempts to excite, feelings of disaffection to the Government established by law in British India, shall be punished with transportation for life or for any term, to which fine may be added, or with imprisonment for a term which may extend to three years, to which fine may be added, or with fine.

Explanation: Such a disapprobation of the measures of the Government as is compatible with a disposition to render obedience to the lawful authority of the Government, and to support the lawful authority, of the Government, against unlawful attempts to subvert or resist that authority, is not disaffection. therefore, the making of comments on the methods of the Government, with the intention of against unlawful a exciting only this species of disapprobation, is not an offence within this clause.

The section related to sedition initially had its place in the code, as Section 113, when Thomas Babington Macaulay drafted the Penal Code in 1837. However, for reasons unknown, it was omitted from the actual Code. It was finally added in 1870 on the suggestion of James Fitzjames Stephen, at the time handling legal issues in the colonial Government of India. Due to increasing Wahabi activities, and fearing that Muslim preachers would incite religious war in the Indian subcontinent, the Raj introduced this section under the title "Exciting disaffection".

Stephen's version of 1870 was amended to a large extent through the IPC Amendment Act of 1898. The current section stands very much similar to the 1898 section; however minor alterations were made at various points in India's colonial and post-colonial history—in 1937, 1948, 1950, and by Part B States (Law) Act, 1951.

A case in 1958, Ram Nandan v State, heard by the Allahabad High Court declared the sedition law void. The Punjab high court had also struck down the law. A Supreme Court judgment in 1962 brought back sedition into the Constitution, interpreting the section to say that it only applies if there is "incitement to violence".

Sedition was made cognizable for the first time during the tenure of Indira Gandhi via the 1973 Code of Criminal Procedure (CR.P.C) which replaced the 1898 CRPC.

On May 11, 2022, the Supreme Court of India suspended the colonial-era law. The court said that the law has been misused by governments to quash dissent and that it was not in tune with the times. Due to this, hundreds of people who were jailed under the law have become eligible for bail. The ruling does not overturn the sedition law, the law has only been put on temporary hold and no further cases can be registered under this law until the ongoing review by the government is completed.

== Notable cases ==
=== Pre-independence ===
The first known registered case under the section was in Calcutta High Court in 1891; Queen Empress v Jogendra Chunder Bose. Bose's article, published in his own Bengali magazine Bangobasi, criticized the Age of Consent Act, 1891. The Act was described as "forced Europeanisation" and a gag on Hindus, who were described as legally incapable and prevented from rebelling against the Act. The authorities put forth a claim that Bose had incited rebellion; in his instructions to the jury, the Chief Justice William Comer Petheram explained the meaning of "disaffection" as "a feeling contrary to affection, in other words, dislike or hatred" and linked it with disobedience towards the government. Bose was nevertheless released on bail, and the case was dropped.

The sedition trial of 1897 against Lokmanya Tilak is historically famous. Tilak, a lawyer by training, was also politically active in support of independence. He established and published two dailies—Kesari in Marathi and Mahratta in English; both being published from Pune. In 1894, Professor R. P. Karkaria presented his paper on the Maratha king Shivaji to the Royal Asiatic Society in Bombay. This turned into an annual celebration commemorating the anniversary of Shivaji's coronation. Three years later, Tilak published reports of this celebration, as "Shivaji's Utterances"; this essay doubled as an attack on the colonial government. Justice Arthur Strachey, who presided over Tilak's case, widened the understanding of Section 124A. Under Strachey's definition, the attempt to excite "feelings of enmity" against the government was also a form of sedition. Tilak was found guilty by the jury and sentenced to 18 months of rigorous imprisonment. Tilak again faced charges against sedition for two Kesari articles, titled "The Country's Misfortune" (12 May 1908) and "These Remedies Are Not Lasting" (9 June 1908). Once again Tilak was found guilty under the newly drafted section 124A, and sentenced to six years of imprisonment in Burma. Despite the verdict, this trial, according to historian Mithi Mukherjee, "marked a fundamental discursive rupture in the history of empire and paved the way for mass anticolonial movements under the leadership of Gandhi. In 1922, Mahatma Gandhi's three articles for Young India resulted into his and Shankarlal Banker's imprisonment under the sedition section. While appearing in court, Gandhi referred to Section 124A as the "prince among the political sections of the Indian Penal Code designed to suppress the liberty of the citizen".

=== Post-independence ===
In 1951, the Punjab High Court ruled Section 124A to be unconstitutional. A similar ruling was passed in 1959 by the Allahabad High Court, which also concluded that it struck at the very root of free speech. The Government of India appealed to the Supreme Court of India, which in 1962 ruled that speeches against the government or political parties were not illegal while upholding it as applicable to separatism by persuasion or force; this pronouncement had the effect of diluting the law.

During the 21st century, various notable authors, creative professionals, activists, and politicians have been charged with sedition under Section 124A. Cases include the then Vishva Hindu Parishad (VHP) general secretary Praveen Togadia (2003), Simranjit Singh Mann (2005), Binayak Sen (2007), author Arundhati Roy (2010), cartoonist Aseem Trivedi (2012), student activist Rinshad Reera (2019), climate activist Disha Ravi (2020).

== Low conviction rate ==
Between 2014 and 2019, 326 sedition cases were filed in India, charge sheets were filed in 141 cases which resulted in only 6 convictions.

On 15 July 2021, the Chief Justice of India N.V. Ramana drew attention to the fact that the rate of conviction under sedition is very low and that this law has been misused by the executive powers. Some critics of the law further elaborate on this point by claiming that the purpose of this law is not to convict the charged, but to harass and to silence critics of the government by the means of a long drawn out process.

== Criticism ==
In post-independence India, Section 124A came under criticism at numerous intervals, being singled out for its curbing of free speech. When the First Amendment of the Constitution of India was passed in 1951, Prime Minister Jawaharlal Nehru proposed to "get rid of it [Section 124A]" as written, and favoured handling sedition-related by other means. Several opinion-makers have called for the abolishing of sedition laws in the context of the 2016 protests at the Jawaharlal Nehru University. In 2018, the Law Commission of India published a consultation paper that asked for a possible amendment or repeal of the law. During the 2019 Indian general election, the opposition Indian National Congress (INC) included a specific proposal to abolish Section 124A in their manifesto. However, while the INC-led United Progressive Alliance had been in power (2004–2014), the section had remained intact and was used to file charges on various citizens; following 2012-2013 protests against Kudankulam Nuclear Power Plant in Tamil Nadu, an "astonishing number" of citizens faced trial under Section 124A: 23,000 were in temporary custody, of whom 9,000 were arrested only for sedition.

Critics of the law claim that sedition is an outdated law from the colonial era and it curtails the freedom of speech and that it has no place in a modern democracy. Critics further point out that the law was introduced by the colonial government in India to curtail dissent and that Britain has since abolished this law in 2009. The then Parliamentary Under Secretary of State at the Ministry of Justice of UK, Claire Ward said:

"The existence of these obsolete offences in this country had been used by other countries as justification for the retention of similar laws which have been actively used to suppress political dissent and restrict press freedom. Abolishing these offences will allow the UK to take a lead in challenging similar laws in other countries, where they are used to suppress free speech.”

The Editor's Guild of India has called this a "draconian law", and has demanded the repeal of this law and has also expressed that "this law has no space in any modern liberal democracy". The Indian Women Press Corps (IWPC) also has said:

“We have noticed, with dismay, a growing trend in India in recent times where both central and state governments have routinely slapped sedition charges on journalists for articles, tweets, Facebook posts that criticise government policies…In January 2021, IWPC founder member Mrinal Pande and some other journalists were booked for sedition for tweets relating to farmers’ protest.”

The Press Club of India has condemned the use of this law by state governments against senior journalists for the coverage of the farmers protests. Furthermore, some critics of the law say that the purpose of this law is not to convict, but for the government to harass its critics through the drawn out process.

== Alternatives ==
The following laws in India address the same aspects covered by the sedition law—

- Unlawful Activities Act
- Public Safety Acts (such as the JK PSA)
- National Security Act

== Amending and repealing Section 124A ==
Numerous critics, students, former government employees including Indian Police Service and Indian Administrative Service officers, legal thinkers and judges, scholars, human rights and civil liberty advocates, journalists, and so on have commented against the sedition law, calling for it to be scrapped or undergo amendments.

A law student proposes "the following modification to the law is suggested. Section 124A should be retained subject to three conditions: first, that, the offender must be in a position of authority...; second, that, the offending words must be understood in context...; and, third, they should have a tendency to actually cause violence or disorder....""

In 2021, Kishorechandra Wangkhemcha and Kanhaiya Lal Shukla petitioned the Supreme Court against the law. The court admitted the case.

As of 11 May 2022, the law has been put on hold by the Supreme Court citing re-examination.

== Replacement ==
As of 2024 Sedition clause of Indian Penal Code has been repealed and replaced with Section 147 of Bharatiya Nyaya Sanhita which describes treason against the government. The words "excites or attempts to excite disaffection towards, the Government established by law in India" has been replaced with "Whoever wages war against the Government of India, or attempts to wage such war, or abets the waging of such war"
