= Cartoons Against Corruption =

- Founder: Aseem Trivedi
- Type: Cartoon based Anti-Corruption Campaign
- Region served: India

Cartoons Against Corruption is a cartoon-based campaign mounted by the political cartoonist Aseem Trivedi to support the anti-corruption movement in India, which is best known for its sharp, hard-hitting anti-corruption cartoons. Crime Branch, Mumbai banned the website of Cartoons Against Corruption during the hunger strike of Anna Hazare in December 2011.

Cartoonist Aseem Trivedi was arrested in September 2012 and was sent to judicial custody till 24 September on charges of sedition, which is a non-bailable offence.

Mr Trivedi had said that he would not apply for bail till the sedition charges against him had been dropped. His bail was granted with a personal bond of Rs. 5000 on the basis of an independent petition by a lawyer, who also asked the court to remove the accusations of sedition - the court said it would decide that on September 17.

== The Beginning ==
=== The cartoons attract mass attention ===
In December 2011, social activist, Anna Hazare, announced a hunger strike demanding an anti-corruption bill. Trivedi decided to join and display his anti-corruption cartoons at MMRDA ground, Mumbai. He reached Mumbai with large posters of his cartoons from Cartoons Against Corruption. These and other efforts eventually led to the Jan Lokpal Bill.

== Website blockage ==
On the very first day of the hunger strike, Crime Branch (Mumbai) ordered BigRock, the host of www.cartoonsagainstcorruption.com, to block the cartoon website, and the website was suspended within 24 hours. Neither Crime Branch nor the website-hosting company had served the cartoonist a prior notice.

Mumbai Crime Branch ordered the suspension of the site on the complaint of a Mumbai-based leader of Congress, R. P. Pandy. The complaint stated that “defamatory and derogatory cartoons” were displayed as posters during Mr. Hazare's hunger strike in Mumbai. Noting that the posters were created by Aseem Trivedi and “are believed to be made at the instance of Shri Anna Hazare,” the complaint requested “strict legal action in the matter.”

The domain provider, Big Rock, explained its decision to take down the website, which featured more than 50 anti-corruption cartoons, in a statement that read, "We have received a complaint from Crime Branch – Mumbai against domain name ‘cartoonsagainstcorruption.com’ for displaying objectionable pictures & texts related to flag and emblem of India. Hence we have suspended the domain name and its associated services. You may contact them at mahapolice.gov.in for further assistance." Just after getting his website banned, the cartoonist created a new blog on Blogger, a Google-based service.

In an interview with the Wall Street Journal’s "India Real Time," Trivedi declared that his intention was to “depict the ailing truth of the nation and send across a strong message to the masses.” Trivedi continued: “By suppressing art, you cannot suppress corruption. The aam admi [common man] succumbs at the realms of corruption every second – from struggling to achieve justice for a raped daughter to obtaining old age pension from corrupt government officers.” He also declared that his work was inspired by the Anna Hazare anti-corruption movement. “Should we not put our foot down?” he asked.

=== The debate in the Parliament ===
These anti-corruption cartoons also provoked an MP, Ram Kripal Yadav, to initiate a discussion in the Rajya Sabha, labeling the cartoons as an “insult to the Indian Parliament.” RJD MP Ram Kripal Yadav raised the issue in the upper house of the Parliament on the same day, when Rajniti Prasad, another MP of his own party, tore up a copy of the Lokpal Bill copy in the same house.

=== Protests against the ban ===
Supporters of the artist's right to freedom of expressions continued to issue harsh critiques against Mumbai Police and the domain holder, Big Rock, for taking down the website without giving Trivedi any chance to defend himself or contest the ban. Many writers, artists, and activists gathered at Rajghat, New Delhi to protest against the undemocratic ban on the Cartoons Against Corruption.

==== Save Your Voice ====
The experience turned Trivedi into a sort of full-time activist. He subsequently floated a body against censorship. After the ban on Cartoons Against Corruption, Trivedi started “Save Your Voice,” a movement against Internet censorship, along with his journalist friend Alok Dixit, and started protesting against internet censorship in India.

== Controversy ==
=== The charges and allegations ===
The cartoonist faced the serious allegations of insulting national emblem, Parliament, flag and constitution through Cartoons Against Corruption. In January 2012, a case of treason (section 124 A of the Indian Penal Code) was filed against him in Beed District Court, Maharashtra. Additional charges were brought against him by the Mumbai High Court for insulting India's national symbols, under Indian Penal Code (Prohibition of Improper Use) Act 2005. If found guilty of publishing cartoons in violation of this penal code Trivedi can face up to two years in prison and a fine of up to 5,000 rupees (approx. $100). Banning cartoons and harassing cartoonists, though rare, is not unheard of in India. In 1987, in the southern Indian state of Tamil Nadu, the editor of a weekly magazine was arrested and sentenced to three months of rigorous imprisonment for publishing a cartoon mocking politicians, according to a 2003 account in Frontline magazine. The ensuing furor from the media community saw him released within a few days.

=== Trivedi’s imprisonment ===
Aseem Trivedi was arrested on 9 September 2012, based on a political activist's complaint that his cartoons insulted the country. The arrest highlighted the government's increased sensitivity to criticism.

Aseem Trivedi had originally refused to seek bail and wanted the charges dropped, but changed his mind after receiving assurances from authorities that they would be reviewed, Vijay Hiremath said. Aseem Trivedi walked out of Mumbai's Arthur Road Jail on 12 September 2012 after the local high court said there was no need for him to be held in prison.

In comments after his release, televised from outside the jailhouse, the satirist vowed to continue his campaign against the country's colonial-era law on sedition. "This fight will continue until 124A is repealed," he said, holding a microphone. He was referring to section 124A of the Indian Penal Code, which was introduced by the British colonial government in 1860. The law prohibits "words either spoken or written, or by signs or visible representation" that attempts to cause "hatred or contempt, or excites or attempts to excite disaffection," toward the government. Trivedi then thanked his supporters for rallying around him after his arrest triggered a debate over free speech in the world's largest democracy.

== Awards ==
Aseem Trivedi has been selected for the "Courage in Editorial Cartooning Award" of Virginia based Cartoonists Rights Network International the award for launching the Cartoons Against Corruption website, in an effort to mobilize his fellow citizens against India's pervasive political corruption. He is sharing the award with Syrian cartoonist Ali Ferzat, who was abducted and badly beaten in August, 2011 amid the Syrian government's crackdown. Ali Ferzat is in the Time magazine's list of the 100 Most Influential People in the World.

== See also ==
- Aseem Trivedi
- India Against Corruption
- Save Your Voice
