= Freedom of expression in India =

Constitutionally protected right

The Constitution of India guarantees six basic freedoms to all citizens under Article 19, the first among them being the freedom of speech and expression under clause (1)(a). These six basic freedoms were considered vital by the framers of the constitution. However, Article 19(2) allows the state to impose reasonable restrictions in the interest of the sovereignty and integrity of India, the security of the state, friendly relations with foreign states, public order, decency or morality, or in relation to contempt of court, defamation, or incitement to an offence. Despite these constitutional guarantees, India ranked 157th out of 180 countries in Reporters Without Borders' World Press Freedom Index in 2026.

== History ==
The law in its current form finds its root in Section 295A of the Indian Penal Code, enacted by the British Administration in India. This section was inserted into the Indian Penal Code in 1927 via an amendment in the backdrop of a series of murders of Arya Samaj leaders who polemicized against Islam. This began in 1897 with the murder of Pandit Lekhram by a Muslim because he had written a book criticizing Islam. Koenraad Elst argues that "Section 295A was not instituted by Hindu society, but against it. It was imposed by the British on the Hindus in order to shield Islam from criticism". The murder series caught the limelight in December 1926 after the murder of Swami Shraddhananda, who was targeted for the protection he gave to a family of converts from Islam to Hinduism, in addition to writing Hindu Sangathan, Saviour of the Dying Race in 1926.

Precedent for this law started even before this. In a 1915 case against Arya Samaj preacher Dharm Bir, ten Muslims were sentenced for rioting, but Dharm Bir was also charged under section 298 for "using offensive phrases and gestures (...) with the deliberate intention of wounding the religious feelings" of another community, and under Section 153, for "wantonly provoking the riot which subsequently occurred," and "a judge was brought in who could assure conviction".

== Constitutional antecedents ==
The Constitution of India, 1950, was drafted by the Constituent Assembly from 1946 to 1950. However, this Constitution drew on a longer history of antecedent documents drafted either as legislation governing British India or as aspirational political documents.

The Constitution of India Bill, 1895, widely considered to be the first Indian articulation of a constitutional vision, contained the following provision related to freedom of speech and expression: "Every citizen may express his thoughts by words or writings, and publish them in print without liability to censure, but they shall be answerable for abuses, which they may commit in the exercise of this right, in the cases and in the mode the Parliament shall determine."

Other constitutional antecedent documents also contained provisions on freedom of speech and expression. These included the Commonwealth of India Bill (1925), Nehru Report (1928), and States and Minorities (1945). In most cases, these provisions contained some form of restriction on freedom of speech and expression.

== The Debate in the Constituent Assembly ==
The Constituent Assembly of India debated the freedom of speech and expression (Article 19(1) of the Draft Constitution, 1948) on 1 December 1948, 2 December 1948, and 17 October 1949. The draft article read:

"Subject to the other provisions of this article, all citizens shall have the right – (a) to freedom of speech and expression; ...

Proviso: Nothing in sub-clause (a) of clause (1) of this article shall affect the operation of any existing law, or prevent the State from making any law, relating to libel, slander, defamation, sedition or any other matter which offends against decency or morality or undermines the security of, or tends to overthrow, the State."

Most members of the Constituent Assembly welcomed the inclusion of this right. However, conflict emerged around the provisions that placed restrictions on it: while some members opposed the inclusion of these restrictions, others supported them.

Members who opposed the restrictions argued that:

1. There is no point in having a right to freedom of speech and expression in the presence of restrictions.
2. Putting restrictions on the freedom of speech and expression was a British practice.

Members who supported the restrictions argued that:

1. Restrictions were acceptable because the government was no longer a colonial one.
2. The right to free speech is not absolute anywhere else in the world.
3. The law, order, and security of the state cannot be compromised.

Ultimately, the Constituent Assembly voted on the Article and included the "Right to freedom of speech and expression" in the Constitution of India, 1950, with restrictions similar to those outlined in the Draft Constitution, 1948.

== Constitutional law ==
In a landmark judgment of the case Maneka Gandhi v. Union of India, the Supreme Court held that the freedom of speech and expression has no geographical limitation and it carries with it the right of a citizen to gather information and to exchange thought with others not only in India but abroad also.

The constitution of India does not specifically mention the freedom of press. Freedom of press is implied from the Article 19(1)(a) of the Constitution. Thus the press is subject to the restrictions that are provided under the Article 19(2) of the Constitution. Before Independence, there was no constitutional or statutory provision to protect the freedom of press. As observed by the Privy Council in Channing Arnold v. King Emperor: "The freedom of the journalist is an ordinary part of the freedom of the subject and to whatever length, the subject in general may go, so also may the journalist, but apart from statute his privilege is no other and no higher. The range of his assertions, his criticisms or his comments is as wide as, and no wider than that of any other subject". The Preamble of the Indian Constitution ensures to all its citizens the liberty of expression. Freedom of the press has been included as part of freedom of speech and expression under the Article 19 of the UDHR. The heart of the Article 19 says: "Everyone has the right to freedom of opinion and expression, this right includes freedom to hold opinions without interference and to seek, receive and impart information and ideas through any media and regardless of frontiers."

In Romesh Thapar v. State of Madras, Patanjali Shastri, Chief Justice observed: "Freedom of speech and of the press lay at the foundation of all democratic organisations, for without free political discussion no public education, so essential for the proper functioning of the process of popular government, is possible."

The Supreme Court observed in Union of India v. Assn. for Democratic Reforms: "Onesided information, disinformation, misinformation and non-information, all equally create an uninformed citizenry which makes democracy a farce. Freedom of speech and expression includes right to impart and receive information which includes freedom to hold opinions".

In Indian Express v. Union of India, it has been held that the press plays a very significant role in the democratic machinery. The courts have duty to uphold the freedom of press and invalidate all laws and administrative actions that abridge that freedom. Freedom of press has three essential elements. They are:

1. freedom of access to all sources of information,
2. freedom of publication, and
3. freedom of circulation.

In India, the press has not been able to practise its freedom to express the popular views. In Sakal Papers Ltd. v. Union of India, the Daily Newspapers (Price and Page) Order, 1960, which fixed the number of pages and size which a newspaper could publish at a price was held to be violative of freedom of press and not a reasonable restriction under the Article 19(2). Similarly, in Bennett Coleman and Co. v. Union of India, the validity of the Newsprint Control Order, which fixed the maximum number of pages, was struck down by the Supreme Court of India holding it to be violative of provision of Article 19(1)(a) and not to be reasonable restriction under Article 19(2). The Court struck down the rebuttal of the Government that it would help small newspapers to grow.

In Romesh Thapar v. State of Madras (1950), entry and circulation of the English journal "Cross Road", printed and published in Bombay, was banned by the Government of Madras. The same was held to be violative of the freedom of speech and expression, as "without liberty of circulation, publication would be of little value". In Prabha Dutt v. Union of India (1982), the Supreme Court directed the Superintendent of Tihar Jail to allow representatives of a few newspapers to interview Ranga and Billa, the death sentence convicts, as they wanted to be interviewed.

There are instances when the freedom of press has been suppressed by the legislature. The authority of the government, in such circumstances, has been under the scanner of judiciary. In the case of Brij Bhushan v. State of Delhi (AIR 1950 SC 129), the validity of censorship previous to the publication of an English Weekly of Delhi, the Organiser was questioned. The court struck down the Section 7 of the East Punjab Safety Act, 1949, which directed the editor and publisher of a newspaper "to submit for scrutiny, in duplicate, before the publication, till the further orders, all communal matters all the matters and news and views about Pakistan, including photographs, and cartoons", on the ground that it was a restriction on the liberty of the press. Similarly, prohibiting newspaper from publishing its own views or views of correspondents about a topic has been held to be a serious encroachment on the freedom of speech and expression.

=== Restrictions ===
Under Indian law, the freedom of speech and of the press do not confer an absolute right to express one's thoughts freely. Clause (2) of Article 19 of the Indian constitution enables the legislature to impose certain restrictions on free speech under following heads:

- I. security of the State,
- II. friendly relations with foreign States,
- III. public order,
- IV. decency and morality,
- V. contempt of court,
- VI. defamation,
- VII. incitement to an offence, and
- VIII. sovereignty and integrity of India.

Reasonable restrictions on these grounds can be imposed only by a duly enacted law and not by executive action.

==== Security of the State ====
Reasonable restrictions can be imposed on the freedom of speech and expression, in the interest of the security of the State. All the utterances intended to endanger the security of the State by crimes of violence intended to overthrow the government, waging of war and rebellion against the government, external aggression or war, etc., may be restrained in the interest of the security of the State. It does not refer to the ordinary breaches of public order which do not involve any danger to the State.

==== Friendly relations with foreign States ====
This ground was added by the Constitution (First Amendment) Act of 1951. The State can impose reasonable restrictions on the freedom of speech and expression, if it tends to jeopardise the friendly relations of India with other States.

==== Public order ====
This ground was added by the Constitution (First Amendment) Act, 1951 in order to meet the situation arising from the Supreme Court's decision in Romesh Thapar's case (AIR 1950 SC 124). The expression 'public order' connotes the sense of public peace, safety and tranquillity.

In Kishori Mohan v. State of West Bengal, the Supreme Court explained the differences between three concepts: law and order, public order, security of State. Anything that disturbs public peace or public tranquillity disturbs public order. But mere criticism of the government does not necessarily disturb public order. A law punishing the utterances deliberately tending to hurt the religious feelings of any class has been held to be valid as it is a reasonable restriction aimed to maintaining the public order.

It is also necessary that there must be a reasonable nexus between the restriction imposed and the achievement of public order. In Superintendent, Central Prison v. Ram Manohar Lohiya (AIR 1960 SC 633), the Court held the Section 3 of U.P. Special Powers Act, 1932, which punished a person if he incited a single person not to pay or defer the payment of Government dues, as there was no reasonable nexus between the speech and public order. Similarly, the court upheld the validity of the provision empowering a Magistrate to issue directions to protect the public order or tranquillity.

==== Decency and morality ====
The word 'obscenity' is identical with the word 'indecency' of the Indian Constitution. In an English case of R. v. Hicklin, the test was laid down according to which it is seen 'whether the tendency of the matter charged as obscene tend to deprave and corrupt the minds which are open to such immoral influences'. This test was upheld by the Supreme Court in Ranjit D. Udeshi v. State of Maharashtra (AIR 1965 SC 881). In this case the Court upheld the conviction of a book seller who was prosecuted under Section 292, I.P.C., for selling and keeping the book Lady Chatterley's Lover. The standard of morality varies from time to time and from place to place.

==== Contempt of court ====
The constitutional right to freedom of speech would not allow a person to contempt the courts. The expression Contempt of Court has been defined Section 2 of the Contempt of Courts Act, 1971. The term contempt of court refers to civil contempt or criminal contempt under the Act. But judges do not have any general immunity from criticism of their judicial conduct, provided that it is made in good faith and is genuine criticism, and not any attempt to impair the administration of justice. In In re Arundhati Roy ((2002) 3 SCC 343), the Supreme Court of India followed the view taken in the American Supreme Court (Frankfurter, J.) in Pennekamp v. Florida (328 US 331 : 90 L Ed 1295 (1946)) in which the United States Supreme Court observed: "If men, including judges and journalists, were angels, there would be no problem of contempt of court. Angelic judges would be undisturbed by extraneous influences and angelic journalists would not seek to influence them. The power to punish for contempt, as a means of safeguarding judges in deciding on behalf of the community as impartially as is given to the lot of men to decide, is not a privilege accorded to judges. The power to punish for contempt of court is a safeguard not for judges as persons but for the function which they exercise". In E.M.S. Namboodripad v. T.N. Nambiar ((1970) 2 SCC 325; AIR 1970 SC 2015), the Supreme Court confirmed the decision of the High Court, holding Mr. Namboodripad guilty of contempt of court. In M.R. Parashar v. Farooq Abdullah ((1984) 2 SCC 343; AIR 1984 SC 615.), contempt proceedings were initiated against the Chief Minister of Jammu and Kashmir. But the Court dismissed the petition for want of proof.

==== Defamation ====
The clause (2) of Article 19 prevents any person from making any statement that injures the reputation of another. With the same view, defamation has been criminalised in India by inserting it into Section 499 of the I.P.C. Where defamation is concerned, in case of a criminal defamation suit as laid down in Sections 499 and Section 500 of the Indian Penal Code, the issue - in question - being the truth isn't considered a defence. Even if a person has spoken the truth, he can be prosecuted for defamation. Under the first exception to Section 499, truth will only be a defence if the statement was made 'for the public good.' And that, is a question of fact to be assessed by the judiciary. The erstwhile Economic & Political Weekly (EPW) Editor Paranjoy Guha Thakurta's resignation following a legal notice by the lawyers for Adani Power Limited (APL) to the owners – the trustees of Sameeksha Trust, which owns and runs the Journal, Editor and authors of an article later withdrawn for "failing to meet editorial standards," brought the reach of IPC's Section 499 back into limelight.

==== Incitement to an offense ====
This ground was also added by the Constitution (First Amendment) Act, 1951. The Constitution also prohibits a person from making any statement that incites people to commit offense.

==== Sovereignty and integrity of India ====
This ground was also added subsequently by the Constitution (Sixteenth Amendment) Act, 1963. This is aimed to prohibit anyone from making statements that challenge the integrity and sovereignty of India.

== Freedom of the press ==
The Indian Constitution, while not mentioning the word "press", provides for "the right to freedom of speech and expression" (Article 19(1) a). However this right is subject to restrictions under sub clause, whereby this freedom can be restricted for reasons of "sovereignty and integrity of India, the security of the State, friendly relations with foreign States, public order, preserving decency, preserving morality, in relation to contempt, court, defamation, or incitement to an offense". Laws such as the Official Secrets Act and Prevention of Terrorist Activities Act (PoTA) have been used to limit press freedom. Under PoTA, person could be detained for up to six months for being in contact with a terrorist or terrorist group. PoTA was repealed in 2006, but the Official Secrets Act 1923 continues.

For the first half-century of independence, media control by the state was the major constraint on press freedom. Indira Gandhi famously stated in 1975 that All India Radio is "a Government organ, it is going to remain a Government organ..." With the liberalization starting in the 1990s, private control of media has burgeoned, leading to increasing independence and greater scrutiny of government.

It ranks poorly at 138th rank out of 180 listed countries in the Press Freedom Index 2018 released by Reporters Without Borders (RWB). Analytically India's press freedom, as could be deduced by the Press Freedom Index, has constantly reduced since 2002, when it culminated in terms of apparent freedom, achieving a rank of 80 among the reported countries. In 2018, India's freedom of press ranking declined two placed to 138. In explaining the decline, RWB cited growing intolerance from Hindu nationalist supporters of Indian Prime Minister Narendra Modi, and the murders of journalists such as Gauri Lankesh.

In August 2022, more than 100 international writers and artists expressed concern over the attacks on freedom of expression in India. These writers joined the writers' organisations - PEN America and PEN International - to sign a letter addressed to President of India Droupadi Murmu and urged her to support democratic principles.

== Practical constraints and curtailments ==
Hate speech laws in India are regularly abused by political organisations and other influential people. Although these cases rarely result in a conviction, it is used as a form of intimidation which leads to wide spread self-censorship by the people. Apart from hate speech laws there are many other sections in the Indian Penal Code that curtails free speech. Books about history and religion are often targeted due to their very nature of promoting historical criticism.

The vague phrase "decency or morality" used in article 19(2) of the constitution has long enabled the state to engage in wide spread moral policing of mass media and the film and entertainment industry as religious groups often object to liberal ideas and deem all progressive values as indecent.

Freedom of speech and expression, which enable an individual to participate in public activities. The phrase, "freedom of press" has not been used in Article 19, though freedom activists, as well as most scholars and industrialised jurisdictions throughout the world recognise that freedom of expression includes freedom of press. Reasonable restrictions can be imposed in the interest of public order, security of State, decency or morality.

According to the estimates of Reporters Without Borders, India ranks 138th worldwide in press freedom index ( The press freedom index for India is 43.24 for 2018). The Indian Constitution, while not mentioning the word "press", provides for "the right to freedom of speech and expression" (Article 19(1) a). However this right is subject to restrictions under subclause (2), whereby this freedom can be restricted for reasons of "sovereignty and integrity of India, the security of the State, friendly relations with foreign States, public order, preserving decency, preserving morality, in relation to contempt of court, defamation, or incitement to an offence". Laws such as the Official Secrets Act and Prevention of Terrorism Act(POTA) have been used to limit press freedom. Under POTA, person could be detained for up to six months before the police were required to bring charges on allegations for terrorism-related offences. POTA was repealed in 2004, but was replaced by amendments to UAPA. The Official Secrets Act 1923 remains in effect.

For the first half-century of independence, media control by the state was the major constraint on press freedom. Indira Gandhi famously stated in 1975 that All India Radio is "a Government organ, it is going to remain a Government organ..." On 26 June 1975, the day after the so-called emergency was declared in violation of the natural rights of Indian citizens, the Mumbai edition of The Times of India in its obituary column carried an entry that read "D.E.M O'Cracy beloved husband of T.Ruth, father of L.I.Bertie, brother of Faith, Hope and Justica expired on 26 June". With the liberalisation starting in the 1990s, private control of media has increased, leading to increasing independence and greater scrutiny of government.

Organisations like Tehelka and NDTV have been particularly influential, e.g. in bringing about the resignation of powerful Haryana minister Venod Sharma. In addition, laws like Prasar Bharati act passed in recent years contribute significantly to reducing the control of the press by the government. In recent times, the Indian government has been accused of trying to curtail this freedom through various means.

== Sedition ==
According to the English Law, sedition embraces all the practices whether by word or writing which are calculated to disturb the tranquillity of the State and lead an ignorant person to subvert the Government. Basic criticism of the government is not seen as sedition unless the Government believes that it was calculated to undermine the respect for the government in such a way so as to make people cease to obey it. Section 124A of the Indian Penal Code defines the offence of sedition as follows: "Sedition. Whoever by words, either spoken or written, or by signs, or by visible representation, or otherwise, brings or attempts to bring into hatred or contempt, or excites or attempts to excite disaffection towards, the Government established by law in India, shall be punished with imprisonment for life, to which fine may be added, or with imprisonment which may extend to three years, to which fine may be added, or with fine". But Explanation 3 says "Comments expressing disapprobation of the administrative or other action of the Government without exciting or attempting to excite hatred, contempt or disaffection, do not constitute an offence under this section". In Kedar Nath v. State of Bihar (AIR 1962 SC 955), the court upheld the constitutional validity of the Section 124A of I.P.C and also upheld the view taken in Niharendu's case.

The National Security Act (NSA) was introduced in 1980, and the Unlawful Activities Prevention Act, where the conviction rate is 2%, was enacted in 1967.

The sedition laws have empowered the executive branch of the government to use the ambiguously defined provision as an instrument to regulate public opinion and indiscriminately wield power.

== See also ==
- Internet censorship in India
- Politics of India
- Shreya Singhal v. Union of India
- Freedom of press in India
- 2015 Indian writers' protest
