= Sedition =

Incitement of rebellion

Sedition is overt conduct, such as speech or organization, that tends toward rebellion against the established order. Sedition often includes subversion of a constitution and incitement of discontent toward, or insurrection against, established authority. Sedition may include any commotion, though not aimed at direct and open violence against the laws. Seditious words in writing are seditious libel. A seditionist is one who engages in or promotes sedition.

Because sedition is overt, it is typically not considered a subversive act, and the overt acts that may be prosecutable under sedition laws vary by jurisdiction.

== History ==
=== Roman origin ===
In the later Roman Republic, seditio (lit. 'going apart') was the offence of collective disobedience toward a magistrate, which included both military mutiny and civilian mob action. Leading or instigating seditio was punishable by death. Civil seditio became frequent during the political crisis of the first century BCE, as populist politicians sought to check the privileged classes by appealing to public assemblies. The Julio-Claudian emperors addressed this situation by abolishing elections. Under Tiberius the crime of seditio was subsumed in the law of majestas, which prohibited any utterance against the dignity of the emperor. Seditio has often been proposed as the offence for which Jesus was crucified as described in Luke 23:14: "inciting the people to rebellion" (Greek: ἀποστρέφοντα τὸν λαόν, "leading the people astray").

=== Common law jurisdictions ===
The term sedition in its modern meaning first appeared in the Elizabethan era (c. 1590) as the "notion of inciting by words or writings disaffection towards the state or constituted authority". The law developed in the Court of Star Chamber, relying on longstanding scandalum magnatum statutes and a broad repressive act of Mary I against literature that contained "the encouraging, stirring or moving of any insurrection". That seditious statements were true was no defence, but rather an aggravating factor, since true statements were all the more potent. After the Star Chamber's dissolution, enforcement continued in the courts of assize and quarter sessions.

Three classes of seditious offence were commonly charged: "seditious words" manifested by speaking, "seditious libel" by writing or publishing, and "seditious conspiracy" by active plotting. Although England adopted the name of the offence from Roman-derived civil law, it did not rely on the jurisprudence.

==== Australia ====
Australia's sedition laws were amended in anti-terrorism legislation passed on 6 December 2005, updating definitions and increasing penalties.

In late 2006, the Commonwealth Government, under the prime-ministership of John Howard, proposed plans to amend Australia's Crimes Act 1914, introducing laws that meant artists and writers may be jailed for up to seven years if their work was considered seditious or inspired sedition either deliberately or accidentally. Opponents of these laws have suggested that they could be used against dissent that may be seen as legitimate.

In 2006, the then Australian attorney-general, Philip Ruddock, had rejected calls by two reports—from a Senate committee and the Australian Law Reform Commission—to limit the sedition provisions in the Anti-Terrorism Act 2005 by requiring proof of intention to cause disaffection or violence. He had also brushed aside recommendations to curtail new clauses outlawing "urging conduct" that "assists" an "organization or country engaged in armed hostilities" against the Australian military.

These laws were amended in Australia on 19 September 2011. The 'sedition' clauses were repealed and replaced with 'urging violence'.

==== Canada ====
In Canada, sedition, which includes speaking seditious words, publishing a seditious libel, and being party to a seditious conspiracy, is an indictable offense, for which the maximum punishment is of fourteen years' imprisonment. For military personnel, Section 82 of the National Defence Act cites Seditious Offences as advocating governmental change by force, punishable by imprisonment for life or to less. Service offences up to two years imprisonment are served in a military prison, followed by transfer to a penitentiary for the remainder of the sentence.

During World War II, Camillien Houde campaigned against conscription. On 2 August 1940, Houde publicly urged the men of Quebec to ignore the national registration measure introduced by the federal government. Three days later, he was placed under arrest by the Royal Canadian Mounted Police on charges of sedition, and then confined without trial in internment camps in Petawawa, Ontario and Ripples, New Brunswick until 1944. Upon his release on 18 August 1944, he was greeted by a cheering crowd of 50,000 Montrealers, and won back his job as Montreal mayor in 1944's civic election.

==== Germany ====
Volksverhetzung ("incitement of the people") is a legal concept in Germany and some Nordic countries. It is sometimes loosely translated as sedition, although the law bans the incitement of hatred against a segment of the population such as a particular race or religion.

==== Hong Kong ====
A Sedition Ordinance had existed in the territory since 1970, which was subsequently consolidated into the Crimes Ordinance in 1972. According to the Crimes Ordinance, a seditious intention is an intention to bring into hatred or contempt or to excite disaffection against the person of government, to excite inhabitants of Hong Kong to attempt to procure the alteration, otherwise than by lawful means, of any other matter in Hong Kong as by law established, to bring into hatred or contempt or to excite disaffection against the administration of justice in Hong Kong, to raise discontent or disaffection amongst inhabitants of Hong Kong, to promote feelings of ill-will and enmity between different classes of the population of Hong Kong, to incite persons to violence, or to counsel disobedience to law or to any lawful order. Sedition is punishable by a fine of HK$5,000 and imprisonment for 2 years, and further offences are punishable by imprisonment for 3 years.

Article 23 of the Basic Law requires the special administrative region to enact laws prohibiting any act that be said of treason, secession, sedition, subversion against the Central People's Government of the People's Republic of China. The National Security (Legislative Provisions) Bill was tabled in early 2003 to replace the existing laws regarding treason and sedition, and to introduce new laws to prohibit secessionist and subversive acts and theft of state secrets, and to prohibit political organizations from establishing overseas ties. The bill was shelved following massive opposition from the public.

The National Security Law, enacted on 30 June 2020, contains articles prohibiting secession and subversion against the Central Government and the Government of Hong Kong Special Administrative Region. Both charges may carry penalty up to life imprisonment. Notably, Hong Kong's National Security Law was drafted by the Standing Committee of the National People's Congress, and passed by the National People's Congress, as part of the Annex III the Basic Law. This law was written in mainland China's civil law as opposed to Hong Kong's common law traditions.

==== India ====
In 2003, the Vishva Hindu Parishald (VHP) general secretary, Praveen Togadia, was sought to be charged with sedition for allegedly waging a war against the elected government and taking part in anti-national activity.

In 2010, writer Arundhati Roy was sought to be charged with sedition for her comments on Kashmir and Maoists. Two individuals have been charged with sedition since 2007. Binayak Sen, an Indian doctor and public health specialist, and activist was found guilty of sedition. He is national vice-president of the People's Union for Civil Liberties (PUCL). On 24 December 2010, the Additional Sessions and District Court Judge B.P Varma Raipur found Binayak Sen, Naxal ideologue Narayan Sanyal and Kolkata businessman Piyush Guha, guilty of sedition for helping the Maoists in their fight against the state. They were sentenced to life imprisonment, but he got bail in Supreme Court on 16 April 2011.

On 10 September 2012, Aseem Trivedi, a political cartoonist, was sent to judicial custody till 24 September 2012 on charges of sedition over a series of cartoons against corruption. Trivedi was accused of uploading "ugly and obscene" content to his website, also accused of insulting the Constitution during an anti-corruption protest in Mumbai in 2011. Trivedi's arrest under sedition has been heavily criticised in India. The Press Council of India termed it a "stupid" move.

In February 2016, JNU student union president Kanhaiya Kumar was arrested on charges of Sedition & raising voice for the Tukde Tukde Gang under section 124-A of Indian Penal Code (which was part of the sedition laws implemented by the British Rule). His arrest raised political turmoil in the country with academicians and activists marching and protesting against this move by the government. He was released on interim bail on 2 March 2016 for a lack of conclusive evidence. On 13 January 2019, the Delhi Police filed a chargesheet on Monday against former Jawaharlal Nehru University Students' Union (JNUSU) president Kanhaiya Kumar and others in a sedition case lodged in 2016.

On 17 August 2016, Amnesty International India was booked in a case of "sedition" and "promoting enmity" by Bengaluru police. A complaint was filed by ABVP, an all India student organization affiliated to the Hindu Nationalist Rashtriya Swayamsevak Sangh.

In September 2018, Divya Spandana, the Congress Social Media chief, was booked for sedition for calling Narendra Modi, the prime minister of India, a thief.

On 10 January 2019, a sedition case was registered suo-motto against Hiren Gohain and two others for their remarks against the Citizenship (Amendment) Bill. Gohain called the move "a desperate attempt by a cornered government".

On February 13, 2020, a sedition case was registered against Disha Ravi, a climate activist, by the Delhi Police for allegedly trying to incite and perpetuate violence and defame India with regards to her support of the farmers' protest.

A sedition case was filed against Shashi Tharoor, journalist Rajdeep Sardesai, and 5 other journalists by Noida Police for allegedly instigating violence and spreading misinformation over a series of tweets during the violence from the 2020–2021 Indian farmers' protest.

As of May 2022, Supreme Court of India has put sedition law on hold and ordered the government to not book further cases under the same.

Sedition as defined under Section 124A of the Indian Penal Code has been replaced by Section 147 of Bharatiya Nyaya Sanhita

==== Ireland ====
Article 40.6.1° (i) of the 1937 Constitution of Ireland guaranteed the right to freedom of expression, subject to several constraints, among them:

The publication or utterance of seditious or indecent matter is an offence which shall be punishable in accordance with law.

Advocates for freedom of speech have argued that this constraint ought to be removed; any constitutional amendment requires a referendum. The thirty-seventh amendment of the constitution abolished the requirement for blasphemy to be an offence.

The law of the Republic of Ireland since the 1922 independence of the Irish Free State inherited earlier common law principles based on English law. The crime of seditious libel was presumed to persist, although last prosecuted in 1901. After the common law offence of blasphemous libel was ruled in 1999 to be incompatible with the constitution's guarantee of freedom of speech, jurists argued that seditious libel was similarly unconstitutional. Both blasphemous libel and seditious libel were abolished by the Defamation Act 2009, which also created new crime of "publication or utterance of blasphemous matter" to fulfil the constitutional requirement with regard to blasphemy. No new offence was created for sedition in 2009; this was in line with the recommendations of a 1991 consultation paper on libel by the Law Reform Commission (LRC) on the basis that several statutes define offences which are tantamount to sedition.

The Offences against the State Act 1939 created the offences of making, distributing, and possessing a "seditious document". The LRC suggests that "sedition", left undefined by the constitution, might be implicitly defined by the 1939 act's definition of a "seditious document" as one:

1. consisting of or containing matter calculated or tending to undermine the public order or the authority of the State, or
2. which alleges, implies, or suggests or is calculated to suggest that the government functioning under the Constitution is not the lawful government of the State or that there is in existence in the State any body or organization not functioning under the Constitution which is entitled to be recognised as being the government of the country, or
3. which alleges, implies, or suggests or is calculated to suggest that the military forces maintained under the Constitution are not the lawful military forces of the State, or that there is in existence in the State a body or organization not established and maintained by virtue of the Constitution which is entitled to be recognised as a military force, or
4. in which words, abbreviations, or symbols referable to a military body are used in referring to an unlawful organization

These provisions were largely aimed at Irish republican legitimatists who believed the 1922 Free State was a usurpation of the Irish Republic proclaimed in 1916 and again in 1919. The fourth provision made the use of the names "Irish Republican Army" and "Óglaigh na hÉireann" seditious as they were regarded as rightfully used by the Irish Defense Forces. The LRC notes that advocating violence is not essential for a document to be seditious.

The LRC also notes that Section 1A of the Broadcasting Authority Act 1960 (inserted in 1976) prohibited broadcasting of "anything which may reasonably be regarded as being likely to promote, or incite to, crime or as tending to undermine the authority of the State". The 1960 act has since been replaced by the Broadcasting Act 2009, section 39 of which obliges broadcaster not to broadcast "anything which may reasonably be regarded as causing harm or offense, or as being likely to promote, or incite to, crime or as tending to undermine the authority of the State".

==== Mauritius ====
The sedition law in Mauritius is based on Article 283 of the Criminal Code which was enacted in 1838.

==== New Zealand ====
Sedition charges were not uncommon in New Zealand early in the 20th century. For instance, the future prime minister Peter Fraser had been convicted of sedition in his youth for arguing against conscription during World War I, and was imprisoned for a year. Perhaps ironically, Fraser re-introduced the conscription of troops as the prime minister during World War II.

In New Zealand's first sedition trial in decades, Tim Selwyn was convicted of sedition (section 83 of the Crimes Act 1961) on 8 June 2006. Shortly after, in September 2006, the New Zealand Police laid a sedition charge against a Rotorua youth, who was also charged with threatening to kill. The police withdrew the sedition charge when the youth agreed to plead guilty on the other charge.

Following a recommendation from the New Zealand Law Commission, the New Zealand government announced on 7 May 2007 that the sedition law would be repealed. The Crimes (Repeal of Seditious Offences) Amendment Act 2007 was passed on 24 October 2007, and entered into force on 1 January 2008.

==== Singapore ====
The Sedition Act 1948 was a Singaporean statute law which prohibited seditious acts and speech; and the printing, publication, sale, distribution, reproduction and importation of seditious publications. The essential ingredient of any offence under the Act was the finding of a "seditious tendency", and the intention of the offender is irrelevant. The Act also listed several examples of what is not a seditious tendency, and provides defences for accused persons in a limited number of situations.

A notable feature of the Sedition Act was that in addition to punishing actions that tend to undermine the administration of government, the Act also criminalized actions which promoted feelings of ill-will or hostility between different races or classes of the population. In contrast to arrests and prosecutions in the 1950s and 1960s which involved allegations of fomenting disaffection against the government, those in the 21st century such as the District Court cases of Public Prosecutor v. Koh Song Huat Benjamin (2005) and Public Prosecutor v. Ong Kian Cheong (2009) had centred around acts and publications tending to have the latter effect. Academics had raised concerns about whether the Sedition Act was satisfactorily interpreted in those cases, and whether the use of "feelings" as a yardstick to measure seditious tendencies is appropriate.

In Ong Kian Cheong, the accused persons argued that in order for section 3(1)(e) of the Act to be consistent with the right to freedom of speech and expression guaranteed to Singapore citizens by Article 14(1)(a) of the Constitution of the Republic of Singapore (1985 Rev. Ed., 1999 Reprint), it had to be limited to actions expressly or impliedly inciting public disorder. The District Court disagreed, stating that if Parliament had intended to include this additional requirement, it would have expressly legislated to that effect in the Act. The High Court and Court of Appeal have yet to render any judgment on the issue. According to one legal scholar, Koh Song Huat Benjamin and Ong Kian Cheong indicate that in Singapore freedom of speech is not a primary right, but is qualified by public order considerations couched in terms of racial and religious harmony. It has also been posited that if Article 14 is properly interpreted, section 3(1)(e) of the Sedition Act is not in line with it.

On 2 November 2022, the Sedition Act was repealed.

==== Spain ====
After the 2017–18 Spanish constitutional crisis some of the leaders of the Catalan independence movement were charged with several criminal offences, notably rebellion and sedition. An offence similar to the Spanish offence of rebellion did not exist in Germany and the European Arrest Warrant against Carles Puigdemont was withdrawn, allowing him to remain in Belgium. Other leaders who were convicted of sedition received 9–13 years in prison as established in the Spanish Penal Code by a unanimous sentence of the Spanish Supreme Court during the October 2019 trial..

In 2022, it was removed from the Spanish Criminal Code, being replaced with the new lesser-sentence "aggravated public disorder" offense.

==== United Kingdom ====
Sedition was a common law offence in the UK. James Fitzjames Stephen's "Digest of the Criminal Law" stated that:

... a seditious intention is an intention to bring into hatred or contempt, or to excite disaffection against the person of His Majesty, his heirs or successors, or the government and constitution of the United Kingdom, as by law established, or either House of Parliament, or the administration of justice, or to excite His Majesty's subjects to attempt otherwise than by lawful means, the alteration of any matter in Church or State by law established, or to incite any person to commit any crime in disturbance of the peace, or to raise discontent or disaffection amongst His Majesty's subjects, or to promote feelings of ill-will and hostility between different classes of such subjects. An intention to show that His Majesty has been misled or mistaken in his measures, or to point out errors or defects in the government or constitution as by law established, with a view to their reformation, or to excite His Majesty's subjects to attempt by lawful means the alteration of any matter in Church or State by law established, or to point out, in order to secure their removal, matters which are producing, or have a tendency to produce, feelings of hatred and ill-will between classes of His Majesty's subjects, is not a seditious intention.

Stephen in his History of the Criminal Law of England accepted the view that a seditious libel was nothing short of a direct incitement to disorder and violence. He stated that the modern view of the law was plainly and fully set out by Littledale J. in Collins. In that case the jury were instructed that they could convict of seditious libel only if they were satisfied that the defendant "meant that the people should make use of physical force as their own resource to obtain justice, and meant to excite the people to take the power in to their own hands, and meant to excite them to tumult and disorder".

The last prosecution for sedition in the United Kingdom was in 1972, when three people were charged with seditious conspiracy and uttering seditious words for attempting to recruit people to travel to Northern Ireland to fight in support of Republicans. The seditious conspiracy charge was dropped, but the men received suspended sentences for uttering seditious words and for offences against the Public Order Act 1936.

In 1977, a Law Commission working paper recommended that the common law offence of sedition in England and Wales be abolished. They said that they thought that this offence was redundant and that it was not necessary to have any offence of sedition. However this proposal was not implemented until 2009, when sedition and seditious libel (as common law offences) were abolished in England and Wales and in Northern Ireland by section 73 of the Coroners and Justice Act 2009, with effect from 12 January 2010.

In Scotland, section 51 of the Criminal Justice and Licensing (Scotland) Act 2010 abolished the common law offences of sedition and leasing-making with effect from 28 March 2011.

Sedition by an alien is still an offence under section 3 of the Aliens Restriction (Amendment) Act 1919, punishable by up to three months of imprisonment if convicted summarily, or up to ten years of imprisonment if convicted on indictment.

==== United States ====
The charge of seditious libel for true statements was weakened, but not abolished, in the 1735 New York case of Crown v. John Peter Zenger. Zenger had published attacks on Governor William Cosby that were well received in the province. The Attorney General charged him by criminal information, bypassing the grand jury process, and Zenger was acquitted by a trial jury.

President John Adams signed into law the Sedition Act of 1798, which set out punishments of up to two years of imprisonment for "opposing or resisting any law of the United States" or writing or publishing "false, scandalous, and malicious writing" about the President or the U.S. Congress (though not the office of the Vice-President, then occupied by Adams' political opponent Thomas Jefferson). This Act of Congress was allowed to expire in 1801 after Jefferson's election to the Presidency; Jefferson pardoned those still serving sentences, and fines were repaid by the government. This law was never appealed to the United States Supreme Court (which had not yet established its power to invalidate laws passed by Congress granted in Marbury v. Madison) but opponents claimed it was unconstitutional under the First Amendment.

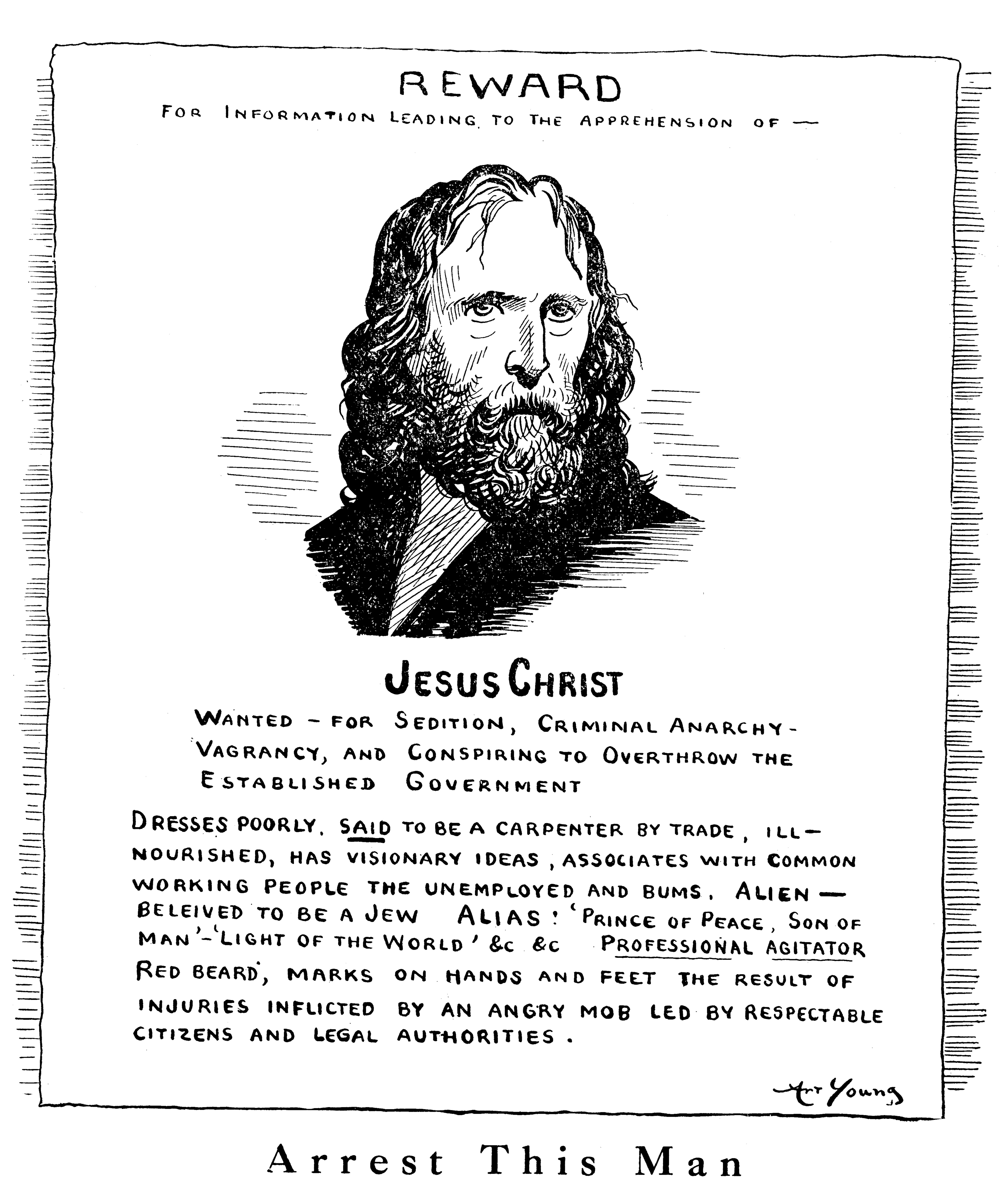
Political cartoon by Art Young, The Masses, 1917

In the Espionage Act of 1917, Section 3 made it a federal crime, punishable by up to 20 years of imprisonment and a fine of up to $10,000, to willfully spread false news of the United States Army or Navy with an intent to disrupt its operations, to foment mutiny in their ranks, or to obstruct recruiting. This Act of Congress was amended by the Sedition Act of 1918, which expanded the scope of the Espionage Act to any statement criticizing the Government of the United States. These laws were upheld by the Supreme Court in the 1919 decisions Schenck v. United States (concerning distribution of flyers urging men to resist the draft) and Abrams v. United States (concerning leaflets urging cessation of weapons production). Schenck led to the "shouting 'fire' in a crowded theater" explanation of the limits of free speech. The laws were largely repealed in 1921, leaving laws forbidding foreign espionage in the United States and allowing military censorship of sensitive material.

In 1940, the Alien Registration Act, or "Smith Act", was passed, which made it a federal crime to advocate or to teach the desirability of overthrowing the United States Government, or to be a member of any organization which does the same. It was often used against communist party organizations. This Act was invoked in three major cases, one of which against the Socialist Worker's Party in Minneapolis in 1941, resulting in 23 convictions, and again in what became known as the Great Sedition Trial of 1944 in which a number of pro-Nazi figures were indicted but released when the prosecution ended in a mistrial. Also, a series of trials of 140 leaders of the Communist Party USA also relied upon the terms of the "Smith Act"—beginning in 1949—and lasting until 1957. Although the U.S. Supreme Court upheld the convictions of 11 CPUSA leaders in 1951 in Dennis v. United States, that same Court reversed itself in 1957 in the case of Yates v. United States, by ruling that teaching an ideal, no matter how harmful it may seem, does not equal advocating or planning its implementation. Although unused since at least 1961, the "Smith Act" remains a federal law.

There was, however, a brief attempt to use the sedition laws, as defined by the Sedition Act of 1918 amendments to the Espionage Act of 1917, after socialist leagues in America distributed leaflets calling for resisting the draft. Those amendments were deemed incompatible with freedom of speech under American law, in spite of the exceptional circumstances that led to those laws, against protesters of the Vietnam War. On 17 October 1967, two demonstrators, while engaged in a sit-in at the Army Induction Center in Oakland, California, were arrested and charged with sedition by a deputy U.S. Marshal. U.S. Attorney Cecil Poole changed the charge to trespassing. Poole said, "three guys reaching up and touching the leg of an inductee, and that's conspiracy to commit sedition? That's ridiculous!" The marshals were in the process of stepping on the demonstrators as they attempted to enter the building, and the demonstrators were trying to protect themselves from the marshals' feet. Attorney Poole later added, "We'll decide what to prosecute, not marshals." This decision drew the ire of California Senator George Murphy, who would later block Poole's confirmation to a federal judgeship in response.

In 1981, Oscar López Rivera, a Puerto Rican nationalist and Vietnam War veteran, was convicted and sentenced to 70 years in prison for seditious conspiracy (among other offenses) for his involvement in FALN - a Puerto Rican independence group that carried out over 130 bombings in the United States. Rivera was tried for being a recruiter and bomb-making trainer. In 1999, he was among the 16 Puerto Rican nationalists offered conditional clemency by U.S. President Bill Clinton in 1999, but he rejected the offer. Then-Congressman, now Governor of Puerto Rico Pedro Pierluisi stated that "the primary reason that López Rivera did not accept the clemency offer extended to him in 1999 was because it had not also been extended to certain fellow Puerto Rico independence movement prisoners, including Mr. (Carlos Alberto) Torres". Torres was released from prison in July 2010. In January 2017, President Barack Obama commuted López Rivera's sentence; he was released May 2017, having served 36 years in prison.

In 1987, fourteen white supremacists were indicted by a federal grand jury for seditious conspiracy between July 1983 and March 1985. Some alleged conspirators were serving time for overt acts, such as the crimes committed by The Order - bank robbery and the assassination of Alan Berg. Others, such as Louis Beam and Richard Butler, were charged for their speech seen as spurring on the overt acts by the others. In April 1988, a federal jury in Arkansas acquitted all the accused of charges of seditious conspiracy. Some still had to serve lengthy prison sentences on other charges, albeit one of the witnesses at the trial, Frazier Glenn Miller Jr., would later kill three people in shootings at Jewish community centers in 2014.

On 1 October 1995, Omar Abdel-Rahman and nine others were convicted of seditious conspiracy after the 1993 World Trade Center bombing.

On 13 January 2022, eleven members or associates of the militia group Oath Keepers, including founder Stewart Rhodes, were charged with seditious conspiracy for their involvement with the January 6 United States Capitol attack. In 2022, three of the charged Oath Keepers pled guilty to the crime, becoming the first convictions since 1995. On 29 November 2022, Rhodes, after pleading not guilty in January 2022, was convicted of seditious conspiracy, becoming the first person convicted by a jury of the crime in 27 years. On 23 January 2023, four additional Oath Keepers were found guilty.

On 6 June 2022, five members or associates of the militia group Proud Boys, including the former chairman Enrique Tarrio, were indicted for seditious conspiracy for their involvement in the January 6 United States Capitol attack.

Sedition is a punishable offense under Article 94 of the Uniform Code of Military Justice.

== See also ==
- Coup d'état
- Criminal anarchy
- Fifth column
- Free speech
- Guerrilla warfare
- Kangaroo court
- Political repression
- Propaganda
- Revolution
- Sabotage
- Sedition Act (disambiguation)
- Sedition Caucus
- Treason
