= Ethical Code for Digital News Websites =

After 75 years of independence from the British Empire, the Britishers passed an act after the first world war of independence in 1857, which curb the freedom of expression. The Government of India and the Digital News Publishers Association have drawn up the Code of Ethics, namely the Ethical Code for Digital News Websites, for the Digital Publishers and News Websites in order to demonstrate the publisher's commitment to responsible digital publishing even as it, in compliance with Article 19(1) of the Constitution of India 1949, protects publishers' constitutionally mandated freedoms and keeps under review and scrutinises any developments likely to restrict the gathering and dissemination of news, current affairs, or any other content.

The mandate of the Code of Ethics is to maintain the standards of digital publishing and protect and maintain the independence of journalists, content entities, and publishers.

== Censorship ==
- Yahoo India voluntarily withdrew and officially announced its intention to discontinue its media publishing and similar services in India in order to comply with the Foreign Direct Investment law laid down in the Code of Ethics.
