= India Against Corruption =

Anti-corruption movement in India

India Against Corruption (IAC) is a non-political anti-corruption movement in India since 2007 which rose to prominence during the anti-corruption protests of 2011. Divisions among personalities on IAC's platform eventually led to the formation of the Aam Aadmi Party.

== Rise ==
The IAC popular movement which began in 2007 as a Hindutva affiliated movement for Right to Information activists concerned with exposing Commonwealth Games and other "scams", expanded as part of a larger wave of demonstrations and protests from 2010. which hoped to bring about a corruption-free India. The campaign gained strength through social media, building a massive network of supporters. Initially Ramdev, a populist Indian yogi seemed to be the figurehead for this campaign but his connections to the right-wing Sangh Parivar threatened to damage the credibility of what was perceived as an apolitical movement. This led to IAC's managers substituting him as centrepiece by Anna Hazare whose connections to Sangh Parivar were less obvious. Hazare's support base is described by Meera Nanda as being largely "from urban middle-classes and idealistic youth". The urban support for Hazare attracted high-profile support for the campaign from Bollywood stars, the internet-savvy, and mainstream English-language news media.

== Aftermath ==
In 2012, the IAC began to disassociate from Hazare's followers (then popularly known as "Team Anna"). On 3 August 2012, the deep differences of opinion among the central figures of the anti-corruption protest spilled into the public domain. Arvind Kejriwal's faction conducted an online survey which suggested that direct involvement in politics was preferable, leading to their exit to form the Aam Aadmi Party (AAP). On 5 August 2012 Hazare rejected the survey findings and announced he was disbanding Team Anna.

In November 2012 Hazare said that he was forming a new Team Anna 2.0 which would have a new office in New Delhi and use the label India against Corruption. Eventually Team Anna instead adopted the name Jantantra Morcha after the India Against Corruption name owners swiftly took it over to focus instead on Right to Information issues instead of the Jan Lokpal. Welcoming Anna's Jantantra Morcha initiative in 2015, National convener of India Against Corruption, Sarabjit Roy said IAC has nothing against Anna since he was never officially a part of IAC nor was he a leader of the movement. IAC's concerns were that Anna is misled into associations with projects and people that he shouldn't be with and Anna was then in the company of scoundrels. As per Roy, IAC is now a group of intellectuals after Arvind Kejriwal took all the aam aadmis (common folk) to politics. The denuded Team Anna's sporadic claims to the India Against Corruption name for political purposes was regularly disputed by the India Against Corruption organization which stated

These persons are imposters of IAC who are misusing our name for electioneering purposes. IAC is a non-political body, and we strongly object to utilisation of our well known name in connection with Mr. Anna Hazare or for political motives.
Gen (Retd.) V.K.Singh was never associated with India Against Corruption and neither was Mr. Anna Hazare a part of it. Referring to them in the context of IAC is misleading especially in context of political activity."

== See also ==
- Corruption in India
