= Promotion (marketing) =

Promotion of a product or service

In marketing, promotion refers to any type of marketing communication used to inform target audiences of the relative merits of a product, service, brand or issue, persuasively. It helps marketers to create a distinctive place in customers' mind, it can be either a cognitive or emotional route. The aim of promotion is to increase brand awareness, create interest, generate sales or create brand loyalty. It is one of the basic elements of the market mix, which includes the four Ps, i.e., product, price, place, and promotion.

Promotion is also one of the elements in the promotional mix or promotional plan. These are personal selling, advertising, sales promotion, direct marketing, publicity, word of mouth and may also include event marketing, exhibitions and trade shows. A promotional plan specifies how much attention to pay to each of the elements in the promotional mix, and what proportion of the budget should be allocated to each element.

Promotion covers the methods of communication that a marketer uses to provide information about its product. Information can be both verbal and visual.

== Etymology and usage ==
The term promotion derives from the Old French promocion, meaning “to move forward”, “push onward”, or “advance in rank or position”. It ultimately comes from the Latin promotionem, meaning “a moving forward”. The word entered the English language in the 14th century.

The use of the term promotion to refer to "advertising or publicity" is very modern and was first recorded in 1925. It may be a contraction of a related term, sales promotion, which is one element in the larger set of tools used in marketing communications. In turn, it is often further abbreviated to 'promo' as a verb or a noun, as in "Barbara Stanwyck cancelled out her Chicago movie promo date here, announced for mid-month"

The terms, promotion and marketing communications can be used synonymously, but in practice, the latter is more widely used.

== Purpose ==
There are three objectives of promotion. These are:

1. To present information to consumers and others.
2. To increase demand.
3. To differentiate a product.

The purpose of a promotion and thus its promotional plan can have a wide range, including: sales increases, new product acceptance, creation of brand equity, positioning, competitive retaliations or creation of a corporate image.

The term 'promotion' tends to be used internally by the marketing function. To the public or the market, phrases like "special offer" are more common. Examples of fully integrated, long-term, and large-scale promotions are My Coke Rewards in the USA or Coke Zone in the UK and Pepsi Stuff.

== Types ==
There have been different ways to promote a product in person or with different media. Both person and media can be either physically real or virtual/electronic.

=== In a physical environment ===
Promotions can be held in physical environments at special events such as concerts, festivals, trade shows, and in the field, such as in grocery or department stores. Interactions in the field allow immediate purchases. The purchase of a product can be incentive with discounts (i.e., coupons), free items, or a sweepstakes prize draw. This method is used to increase the sales of a given product.

Interactions between the brand and the customer are performed by a brand ambassador or promotional model who represents the product in physical environments. Brand ambassadors or promotional models are hired by a marketing company, which in turn is booked by the brand to represent the product or service. Person-to-person interaction, as opposed to media-to-person involvement, establishes connections that add another dimension to promotion. Building a community through promoting goods and services can lead to brand loyalty.

=== Traditional media ===
Examples of traditional media include print media such as newspapers and magazines, electronic media such as radio and television, and outdoor media such as banner or billboard advertisements. Each of these platforms provides ways for brands to reach consumers with advertisements.

Printed collateral such as brochures, business cards, presentation folders, and catalogs are commonly used as sales aids and for local awareness within print advertising and direct marketing, and as support materials in personal selling and at trade shows. Campaigns may also use promotional merchandise as complementary giveaways to support awareness and recall.

=== Digital media ===
Digital media, which includes Internet, social networking and social media sites, is a modern way for brands to interact with consumers as it releases news, information and advertising from the technological limits of print and broadcast infrastructures. Digital media is currently the most effective way for brands to reach their consumers on a daily basis. Over 2.7 billion people are online globally, which is about 40% of the world's population. 67% of all Internet users globally use social media.

Mass communication has led to modern marketing strategies to continue focusing on brand awareness, large distributions and heavy promotions. Digital media has expanded promotional reach by enabling brands to target consumers across geographic regions, overcoming the limitations of traditional local advertising channels.

Social media, as a modern marketing tool, offers opportunities to reach larger audiences in an interactive way. These interactions allow for conversation rather than simply educating the customer. Facebook, Snapchat, Instagram, Twitter, Pinterest, Tumblr, as well as alternate audio and media sites like SoundCloud and Mixcloud allow users to interact and promote music online with little to no cost. You can purchase and buy ad space on social media platforms. Additionally, you can buy artificial Likes, Followers, and Clicks on your pages and posts with the use of third parties. As a participatory media culture, social media platforms or social networking sites are forms of mass communication that, through media technologies, allow large amounts of product and distribution of content to reach the largest audience possible.^{[2]} However, there are downsides to virtual promotions as servers, systems, and websites may crash, fail, or become overloaded with information. You also can stand risk of losing uploaded information and storage and at a use can also be effected by a number of outside variables.

Brands can explore different strategies to keep consumers engaged. One popular tool is branded entertainment, or creating some sort of social game for the user. The benefits of such a platform include submersing the user in the brand's content. Users will be more likely to absorb and not grow tired of advertisements if they are, for example, embedded in the game as opposed to a bothersome pop-up ad.

Personalizing advertisements is another strategy that can work well for brands, as it can increase the likelihood that the brand will be personified by the consumer. Personalization increases click-through intentions when data has been collected about the consumer.

Brands must navigate the line between effectively promoting their content to consumers on social media and becoming too invasive in consumers' lives. Vivid Internet ads that include devices such as animation might increase a user's initial attention to the ad. However, this may be seen as a distraction to the user if they are trying to absorb a different part of the site such as reading text. Additionally, when brands make the effort of overtly collecting data about their consumers and then personalizing their ads to them, the consumer's relationship with the advertisements, following this data collection, is frequently positive. However, when data is covertly collected, consumers can quickly feel like the company betrayed their trust. It is important for brands to utilize personalization in their ads, without making the consumer feel vulnerable or that their privacy has been betrayed.

=== Sponsorship ===
Sponsorship generally involves supplying resources (such as money) to a group or an event in exchange for advertising or publicity. Company will often help fund athletes, teams, or events in exchange for having their logo prominently visible. This is done through the use of product placement or by placing logos on team uniforms/equipment.

== See also ==
- Advertising
- Advertising campaign
- Advertising management
- Advertising media selection
- Advertising research
- AIDA
- Ad tracking
- Brand awareness
- DAGMAR
- Digital marketing
- Digital promotion
- Integrated marketing communications
- List of marketing topics
- Promotional merchandise
- Marketing communications
- Marketing management
- Market mix modeling
- Media planning
- Native advertising
- Online advertising
- Promotional mix
- Product placement
- Public relations
- Sales promotion
- Social media marketing
- Spin (public relations)
