= Personal selling =

Marketing tactic

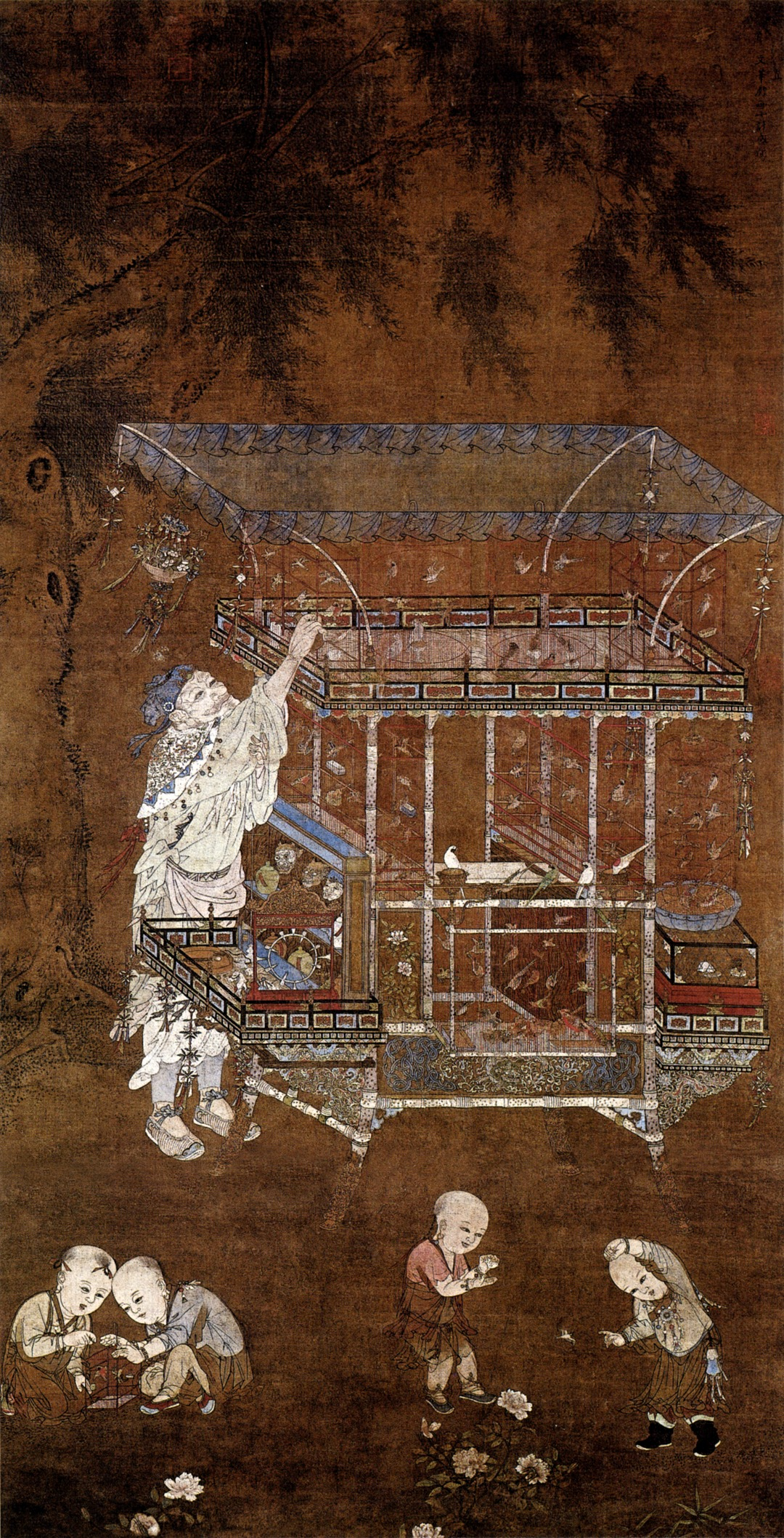
Painting of a peddler selling birds, by Ji Sheng (計盛). China, Ming dynasty, 15th century

Personal selling occurs when a sales representative meets with a potential client for the purpose of transacting a sale. Many sales representatives rely on a sequential sales process that typically includes nine steps. Some sales representatives develop scripts for all or part of the sales process. The sales process can be used in face-to-face encounters and in telemarketing.

== Definition ==
Personal selling can be defined as "the process of person-to-person communication between a salesperson and a prospective customer, in which the former learns about the customer's needs and seeks to satisfy those needs by offering the customer the opportunity to buy something of value, such as a good or service". The term may also be used to describe a situation where a company uses a sales force as one of the main ways it communicates with customers.

== Brief history ==
The earliest forms of exchange involved bartering systems. However, the advent of coinage enabled exchange to occur more efficiently and over much larger distances. The earliest references to selling, involving coin-based exchange, comes from Herodotus who noted that "The Lydians were the first people we know of to use a gold and silver coinage and to introduce the retail trade." This implies that selling and buying, originated in the 7th century BCE, in the area now known as Turkey. From there, selling spread along Mediterranean, and then diffused throughout the civilized world.

The Socratic philosophers expressed some concerns about the new type of selling in around the 4th century BCE. Their commentary was primarily concerned with potential disruption of the more social aspects of selling. Traditional forms of exchange encouraged a social perspective - emphasizing the social bonds that united members of a society. For example, during periods of drought or famine, individuals shared in the plight of their neighbours. However, the advent of this new form of selling encouraged a focus on the individual such that in times of scarcity, sellers raised their prices.

During the Medieval period, trade underwent further changes. Localized trading based on transactional exchange and bartering systems was slowly transformed as transportation improved and new geographic markets were opened. From the 11th century, the Crusades helped to open up new trade routes in the Near East, while the adventurer and merchant, Marco Polo stimulated interest in the far East in the 12th and 13th centuries. Medieval merchants began to trade in exotic goods imported from distant shores including spices, wine, food, furs, fine cloth, notably silk, glass, jewellery and many other luxury goods. As trade between countries or regions grew, trade networks became more complex and different types of sellers filled in the spaces within the network. During the thirteenth century, European businesses became more permanent and were able to maintain sedentary merchants in a home office and a system of agents who operated in different geographic markets. Exchange was often conducted at arm's length, rather than face-to-face.

Local market traders and itinerant peddlers continued to supply basic necessities, but permanent retail shops gradually emerged from the 13th century, especially in the more populous cities. By the 17th century, permanent shops with more regular trading hours were beginning to supplant markets and fairs as the main retail outlet. Provincial shopkeepers were active in almost every English market town. These shopkeepers sold a very broad range of general merchandise, much like a contemporary general store.

Large business houses involved in import and export, often offered additional services including finance, bulk-breaking, sorting and risk-taking. In the 17th century, the public began to make mental distinctions between two types of trader; local traders (Dutch: meerseniers) which referred to local merchants including bakers, grocers, sellers of dairy products and stall-holders, and the merchants (Dutch: koopman), which described a new, emergent class of trader who dealt in goods or credit on a large scale. With the rise of a European merchant class, this distinction was necessary to separate the daily trade that the general population understood from the rising ranks of merchants who operated on a world stage and were seen as quite distant from everyday experience.

In 18th century England, large industrial houses, such as Wedgwood, began mass-producing certain goods such as pottery and ceramics and needed a form of mass distribution for their products. Some peddlers were employed by these industrial producers to act as a type of travelling sales representative, calling on retail and wholesale outlets in order to make a sale. In England, these peddlers were known as Manchester men because of the prevalence of the practice in the sale of cotton cloth manufactured in Manchester. Employed by a factory or entrepreneur, they sold goods from shop to shop rather than door to door and were thus operating as a type of wholesaler or distribution intermediary. They were the precursors to the field sales representative.

== Selling roles and situations ==
Sales activity can occur in many types of situations. Field representatives call on clients, who are typically business clients; door-to-door sales teams call on householders, sales staff may work in a retail or wholesale environment where sales personnel attend to customers by processing orders or sales may occur in a telemarketing environment where the sales person makes telephone calls to prospects. In terms of number of transactions, most selling occurs at the retail level; but in terms of value, most selling occurs at the high-end business-to-business level.

Different types of sales roles can be identified:

- Order takers refers to selling that occurs primarily at the wholesale or retail levels. Order processing involves determining the customer needs, pointing to inventory that meets the customer needs and completing the order.
- Order getters refers to the in-field sales activity where a sales representative travels to the client's home or work place to makes a sales presentation in order to win new business or to maintain relations with existing clients.
- Missionary selling is often seen as a sales support role. The missionary sales person distributes information about products or services, describes product attributes and leaves materials but does not normally close the sale. The missionary sales person often prepares the way for a field sales person. For example, a pharmaceutical sales representative may call on doctors and leave samples, manufacturer information such as results of clinical trials, copies of relevant journal articles etc. in an effort to persuade doctors to prescribe a medication or course of treatment.
- Cold calling refers to a situation when a sales representative telephones or visits a customer without a prior appointment. Cold calling is widely regarded as a demanding sales technique due to its unpredictable nature and the likelihood of rejection. In a cold calling situation, the sales representative is likely to be more conscious of the client's time, and may seek to condense the sales process by combining the approach and the sales presentation into a single step.
- Relationship selling (also known as consultative selling) refers to a sales practice that involves building and maintaining interactions with customers in order to enhance long term relationships. Relationship selling often involves a problem solving approach where the sales representative acts in a consultative role and becomes a partner in the client's problem-solving exercise. Relationship selling is often found in high-tech selling environments. See also: Solution selling
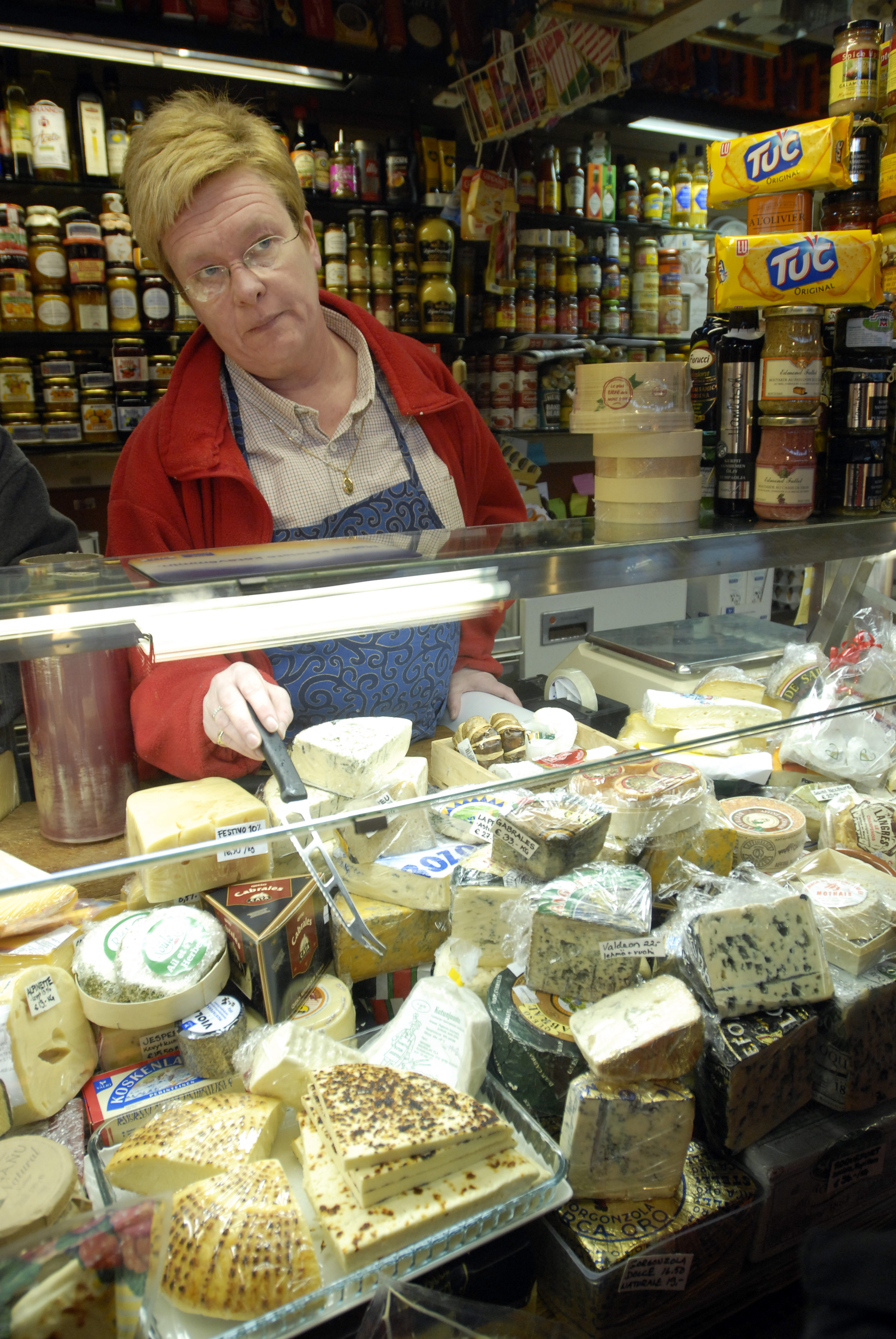
A counter sales assistant in a delicatessen offers taste tests and provides expert advice on products and uses

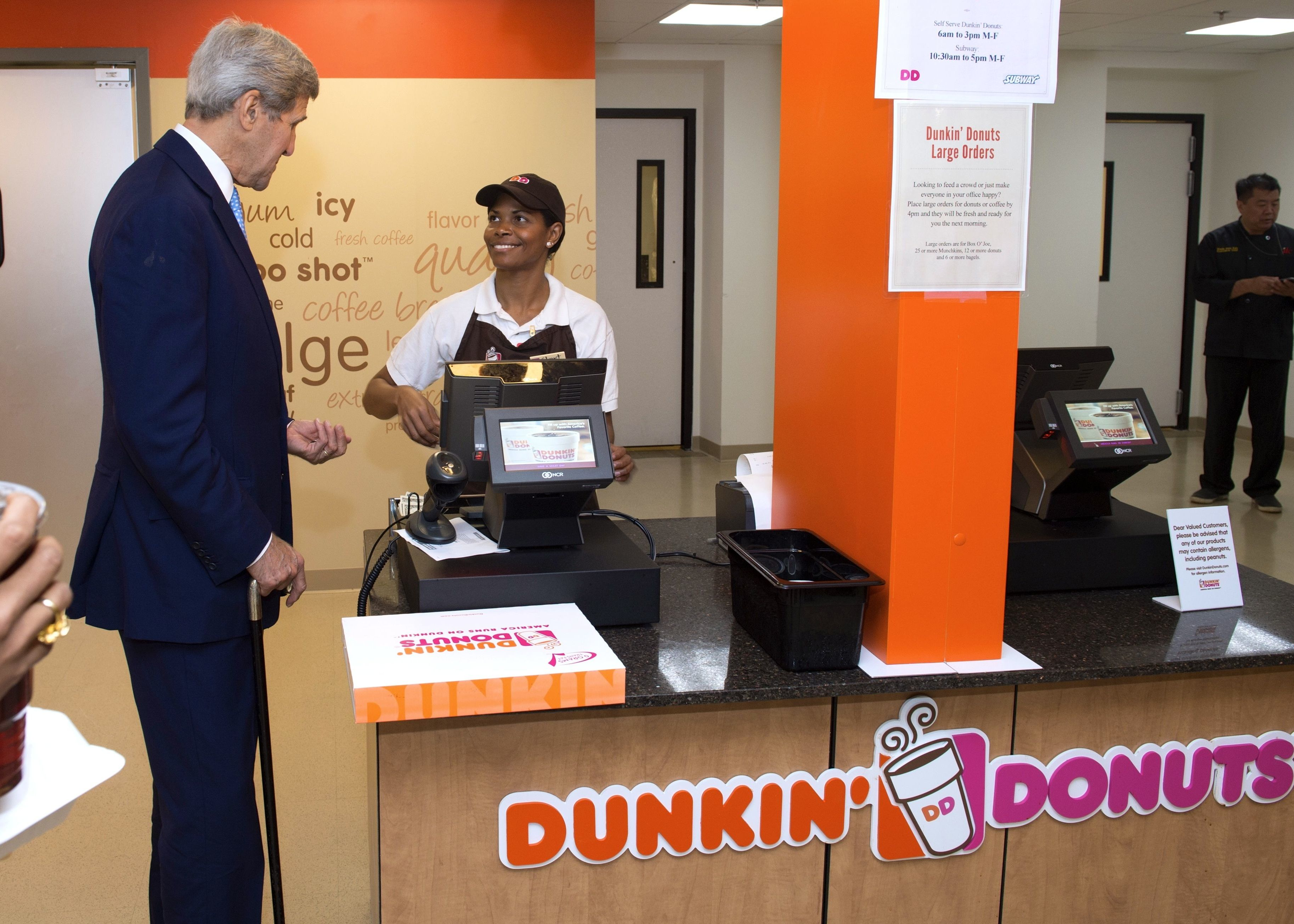
A counter attendant in a fast food operation may be involved primarily in order taking

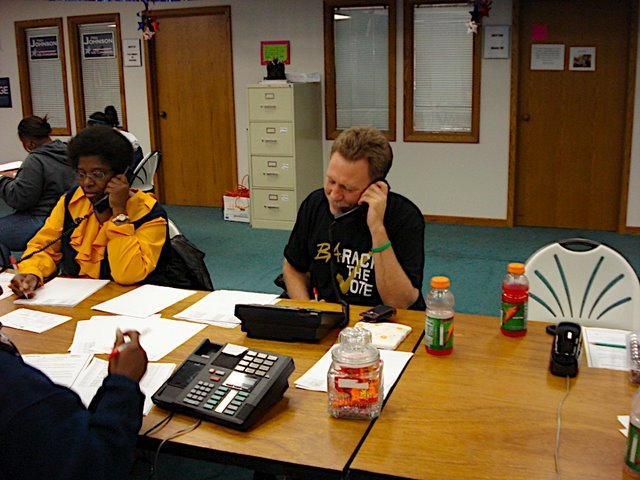
Call centres are primarily involved in cold-calling and work from prepared scripts

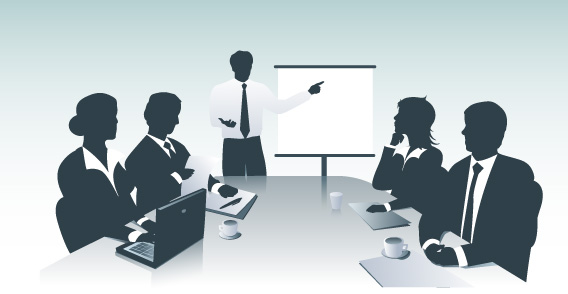
Missionary selling occurs when a salesperson makes a presentation in order to win new business

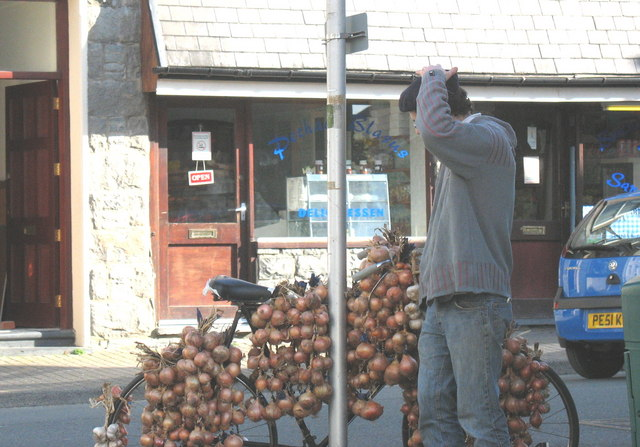
Breton onion salesman with bicycle travelling through Wales may be involved in cold calling on new clients and relationship selling for existing clients

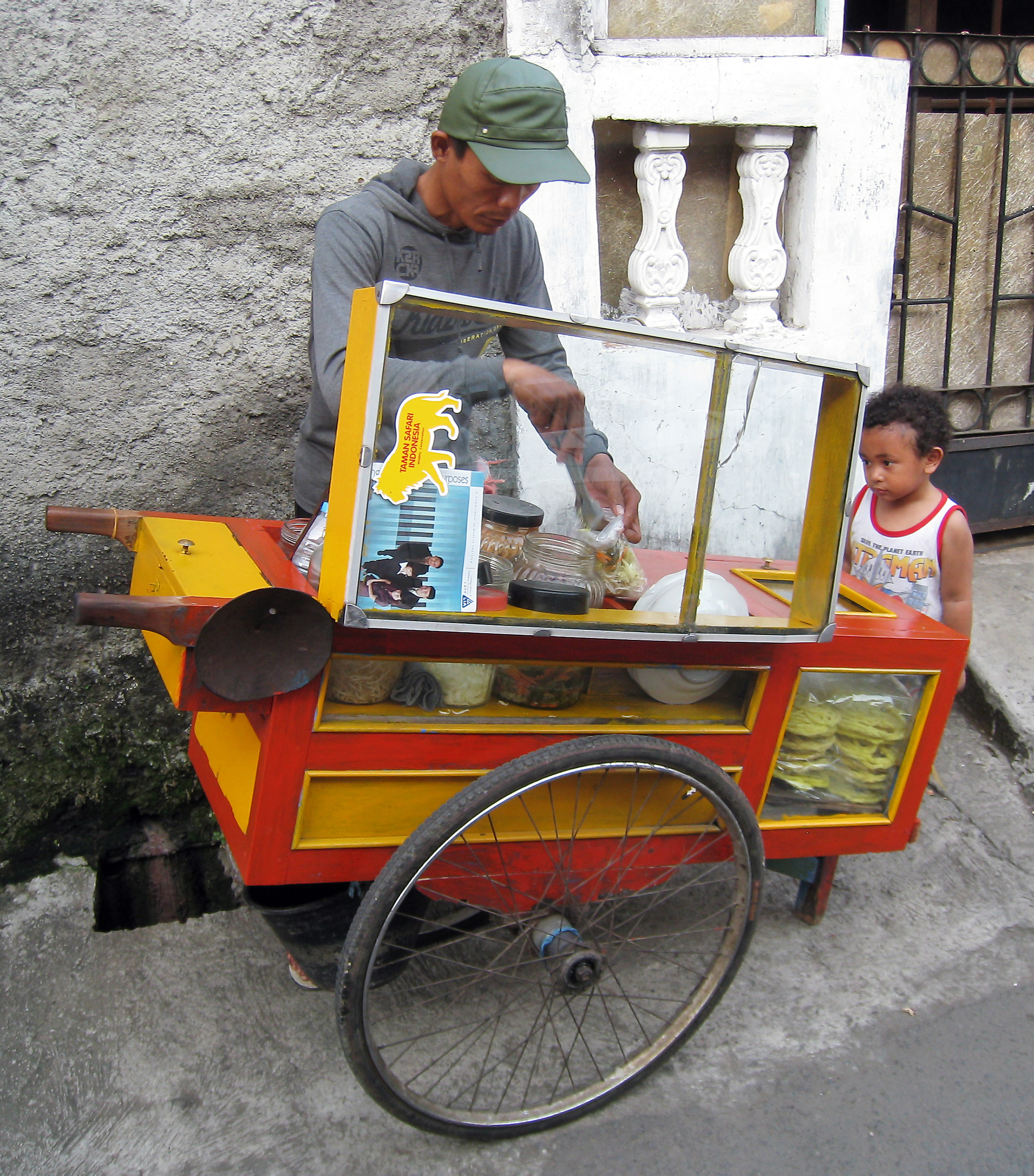
A street hawker in Indonesia is engaged in direct selling

== The sales process ==
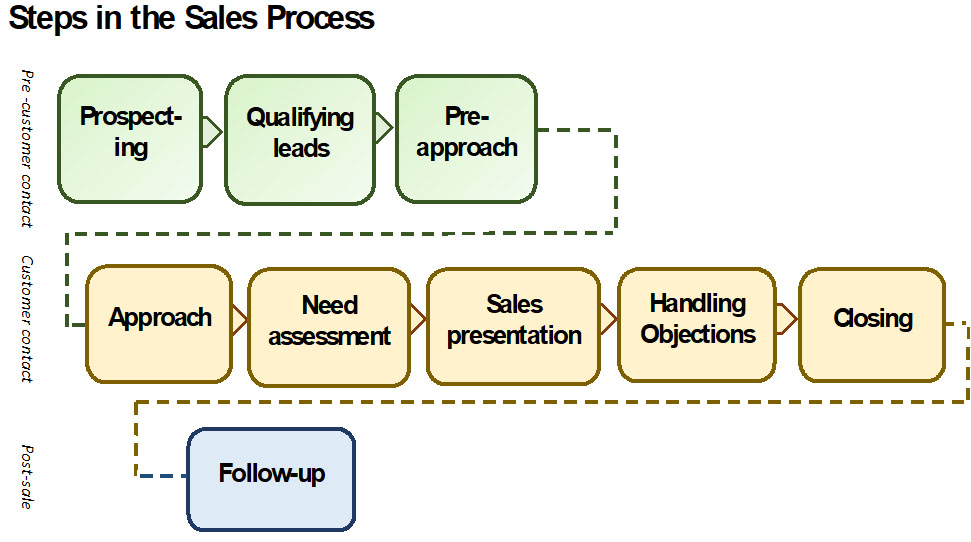
Steps in the sales process

The first text to outline the steps in the selling process was published in 1918 by Norval Hawkins. The basic steps, which have changed only a little since Watkins first proposed them, are prospecting, qualifying leads, preapproach, approach, need assessment, presentation, meeting objections, closing the sale and following up.

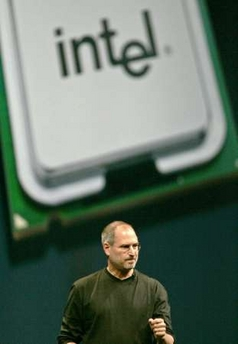
Steve Jobs delivers one of his impressive sales presentations

Prospecting–Identifying prospects or prospecting occurs when the sales person seeks to identify leads or prospects (i.e., people who are likely to be in the market for the offer). To identify prospects, sales representatives might use a variety of sources such as business directories (for corporate clients), commercial databases or mailing lists or simply look at internal records such as lists of lapsed customers. The aim of prospecting is to increase the likelihood that sales staff spend time with potential clients who have an interest in the product or service.

Qualifying leads–After identifying potential customers, the sales team must determine whether prospects represent genuine potential customers. This part of the process is known as qualifying leads, or leads who are likely to buy. Qualified leads are those who have a need for the product, a capacity to pay and a willingness to pay for the product, and are willing to be contacted by the salesperson.

Pre-approach–Refers to the process of preparing for the presentation. This consists of customer research, goal planning, scheduling an appointment and any other tasks necessary to prepare for the sales presentation.

Approach–Refers to the stage when the salesperson initially meets with the customer. Since first contact leaves an impression on the buyer, professional conduct, including attire, a handshake, and eye contact, is advised.

Need assessment–An important component of the sales presentation is the assessment of the customer's needs. Salespeople should evaluate the customer based on the need for the product. Sales representatives typically ask questions designed to reveal the prospective client's current situation, the source of any problems, the impact of the problems, the benefits of the solution, the client's prior experience with the brand or the category, the prospect's general level of interest and readiness to purchase. In the case of corporate clients, it may be necessary to ascertain any limitations on the prospect's authority to make a purchase (e.g. financial restrictions).

Sales presentation–Once the salesperson knows the needs, he or she is ready for the presentation. Sales representatives often follow the AIDA model, which allows them to lead the prospect through the standard stages of the purchase decision process. The steps in the AIDA process are to grab the customer's Attention, ignite Interest, create Desire, and inspire Action (AIDA). The salesperson can do this through product demonstrations and presentations that show the features, advantages and benefits of the product.

Handling objections–After the presentation, the sales person must be ready to handle any objections. Customers who are interested will voice their concerns, usually in one of four ways. They might question the price or value of the product, dismiss the product/service as inadequate, avoid making a commitment to buy, or refuse because of an unknown factor. Salespeople should do their best to anticipate objections and respectfully respond to them.

Closing–When the sales person feels that the prospect is ready, they will seek to gain commitment and close the sale. If the sales person is unsure about the prospect's readiness to buy, they might consider using a 'trial close.' The salesperson can use several different techniques to close the sale; including the 'alternative close', the 'assumptive close', the 'summary close', or the 'special-offer close', among others.

Follow-up–Finally, the salesperson must remember to follow up after the sale has been concluded. Following up will ensure customer satisfaction and help establish a relationship with the customer.

== Sales scripts ==
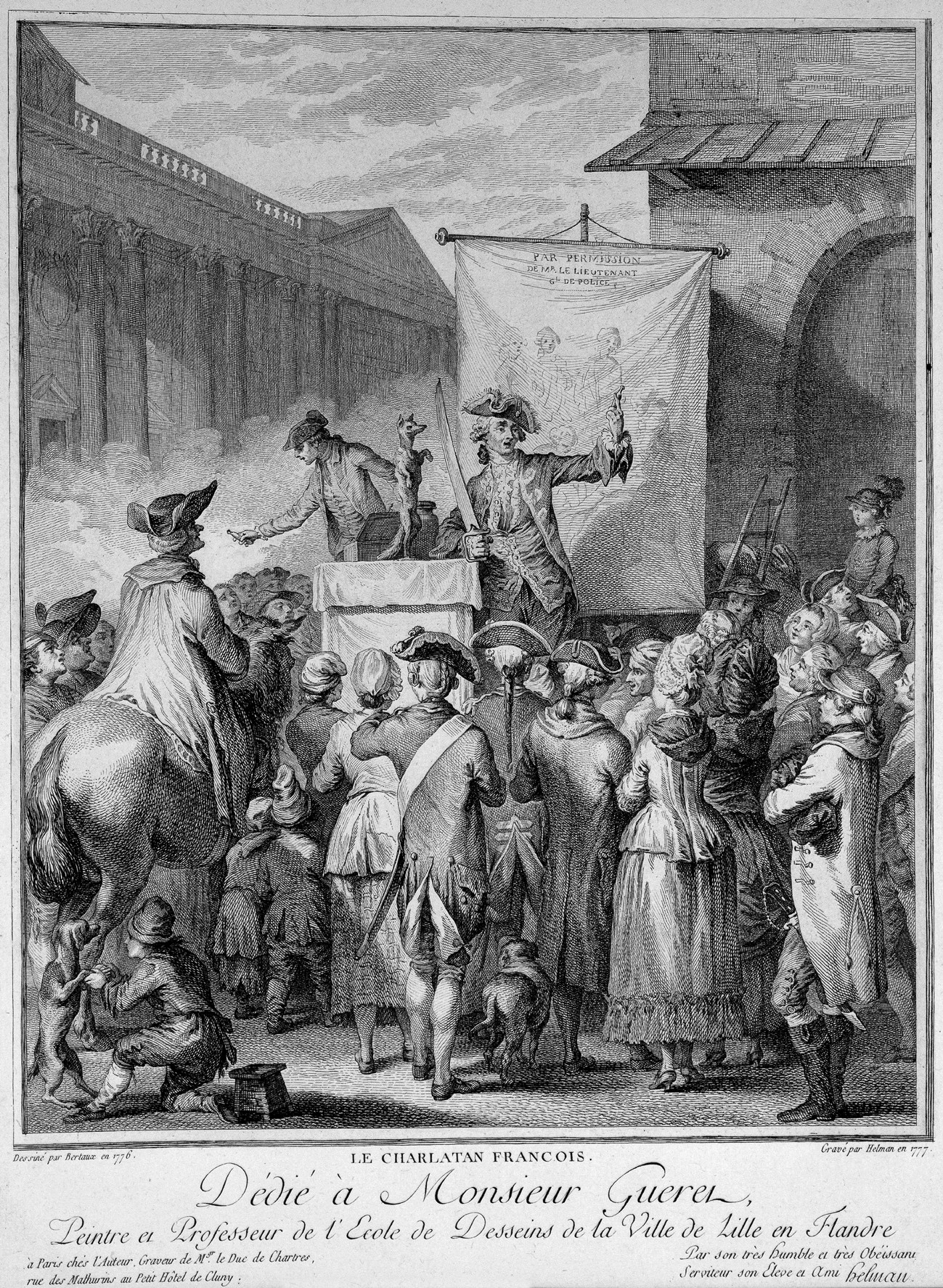
Historically, itinerant medicine salesmen used tightly written scripts that induced audiences to buy

The use of tightly written sales scripts has been known for hundreds of years. Itinerant medicine salesmen, known as mountebanks, used rehearsed stage routines and patter to sell remedies in the early modern period. Experienced sales representatives soon recognize that specific words and phrases have the capacity to elicit desirable behaviours on the part of the prospect. Research studies can also be carried out to determine the most effective words/phrases or the optimal sequence of words/phrases for use in effective sales scripts. A number of research studies have focused on the types of the use of verbal persuasive techniques that can be used to convince prospects such as information exchange, the use of recommendations, requests, promises, or ingratiation. Other research has focused on influence techniques employed. Well-known examples include the:

Door-In-The-Face–technique (DITF): where the target request is presented as a concession to an unreasonably large initial request

Disrupt-Then-Reframe–technique (DTR): where a conventional sales script is interrupted by a subtle, odd element (i.e., a disruptive element) and then followed by a persuasive phrase that concludes the script (i.e., “reframing”)

Once identified, these words, phrases and techniques can be used to build highly effective sales scripts that are known to work. The most effective sales scripts can be codified and used by other sales persons or in sales training.

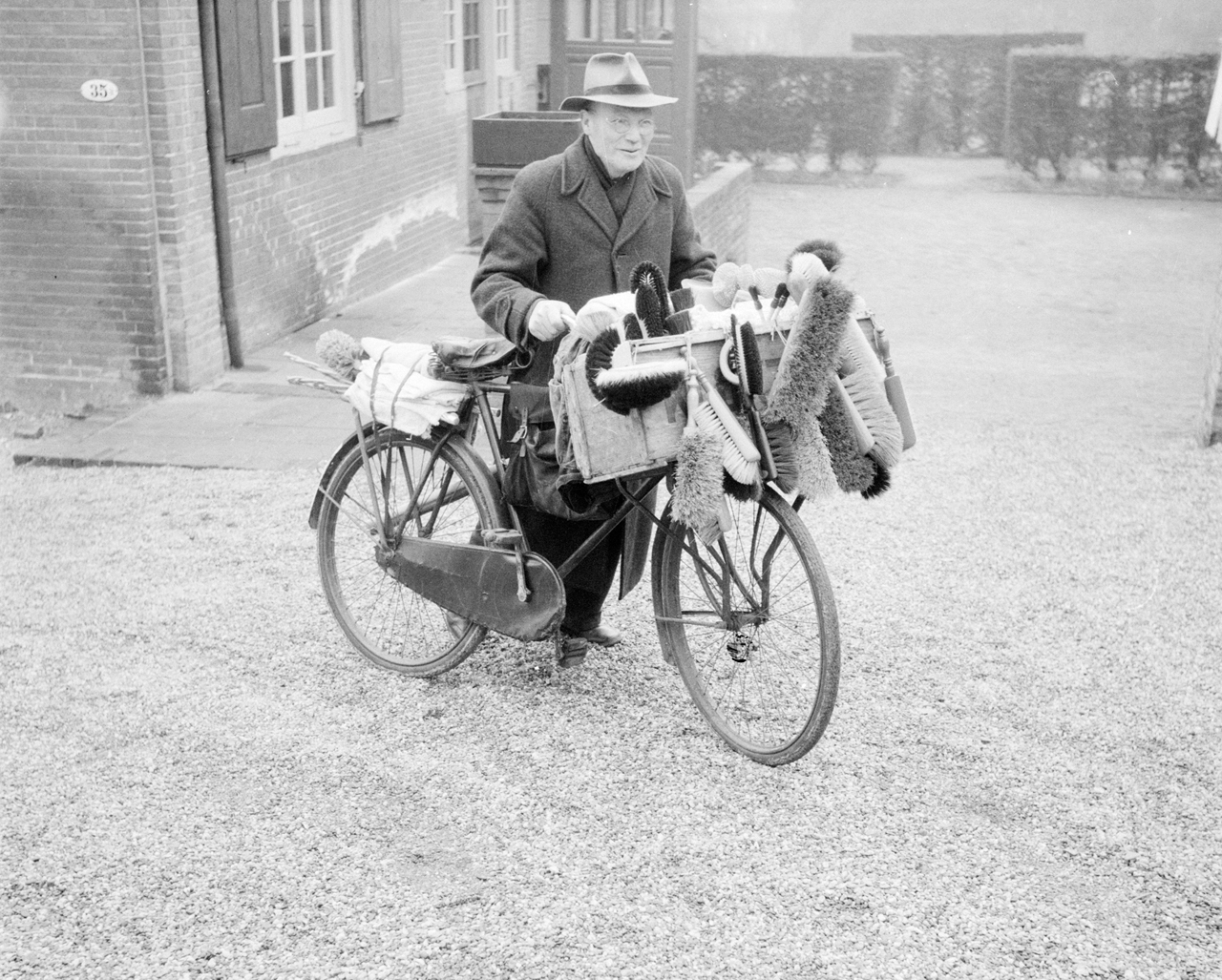
A brush salesman and his bicycle in the 1950s

Many sales scripts are designed to move the prospect sequentially through the cognitive, affective and behavioural stages of the purchase decision process and are designed around the AIDA model (attention →interest →desire →action). Most sales representatives include a greeting, closing and call to action in their scripts. A call to action (CTA) is simply an instruction to the prospect designed to prompt an immediate response. It often involves the use of an imperative verb such as "try it now" or "find out more". Other types of calls-to-action might provide consumers with strong reasons for purchasing immediately such an offer that is only available for a limited time, e.g. 'Limited stocks available' or a special deal usually accompanied by a time constraint, e.g. 'Order before midnight to receive a free gift with your order'. The key to a powerful call-to-action is to provide consumers with compelling reasons to purchase promptly rather than defer purchase decisions.

Sales representatives also learn to recognize specific verbal and non-verbal cues that potentially indicate the prospect's readiness to buy. These cues, which are also known as "buying signals", help to ascertain how much a customer needs the good or service so that the sales representative can focus on those customers who are most likely to make a purchase. For instance, if a prospect begins to handle the merchandise, this may indicate a state of buyer interest. Clients also tend to employ different types of questions throughout the sales process. General questions such as, "Does it come in any other colours (or styles)? indicate only a moderate level of interest. However, when clients begin to ask specific questions, such as "Do you have this model in black?" then this indicates that the prospect is approaching readiness to buy. When the sales person believes that the prospective buyer is ready to make the purchase, a trial close might be used to test the waters. A trial close is simply any attempt to confirm the buyer's interest in finalizing the sale. An example of a trial close, is "Would you be requiring our team to install the unit for you?" or "Would you be available to take delivery next Thursday?"

Sales scripts are used for both inbound and outbound sales. Sales scripts are commonly used in cold calling, especially phone-based cold calling such as telemarketing (outbound selling) and can also be found in chat-based customer care centers (inbound calling). In such cases, the sales script might be confined to a simple list of talking points that the sales person uses as a reference during their conversation with the prospect.

=== Types ===
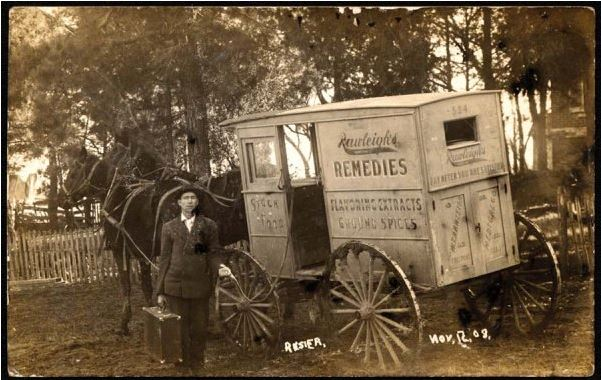
By 1915, an estimated 2,000 "Rawleigh men" distributed Rawleigh products while visiting approximately 20,000 customers daily.

Some sales pitches are entirely scripted while others are only partially scripted allowing the individual sales representatives the flexibility to vary the presentation according to their assessment of the client's needs and interests. However, most effective sales representatives develop scripts for handling common objections and almost always have a number of different trial closes at hand.

There are three broad types of sales script:

==== Prescribed scripts ====
Prescribed scripts are highly detailed scripts which specify precise phrases to be used in given situations. Prescribed scripts are widely used in a variety of contexts including direct selling, market research, fast food service.

The main advantages of prescribed scripts are:

- can enable speedy transactions
- provides uniform delivery.

The main disadvantages of a prescribed script are:

- tendency for the delivery to become robotic and lacking in authenticity

==== Goal-driven scripts ====
Goal driven scripts are more flexible. This type of script defines the goals for each type of transaction and allow employees to use their own phrases during the encounter. Provided that employees have a clear picture of the goals and purpose, goal-driven scripts can appear more natural and authentic. However the use of goal-driven scripts requires employees with well developed communication skills.

==== Hybrid approach ====
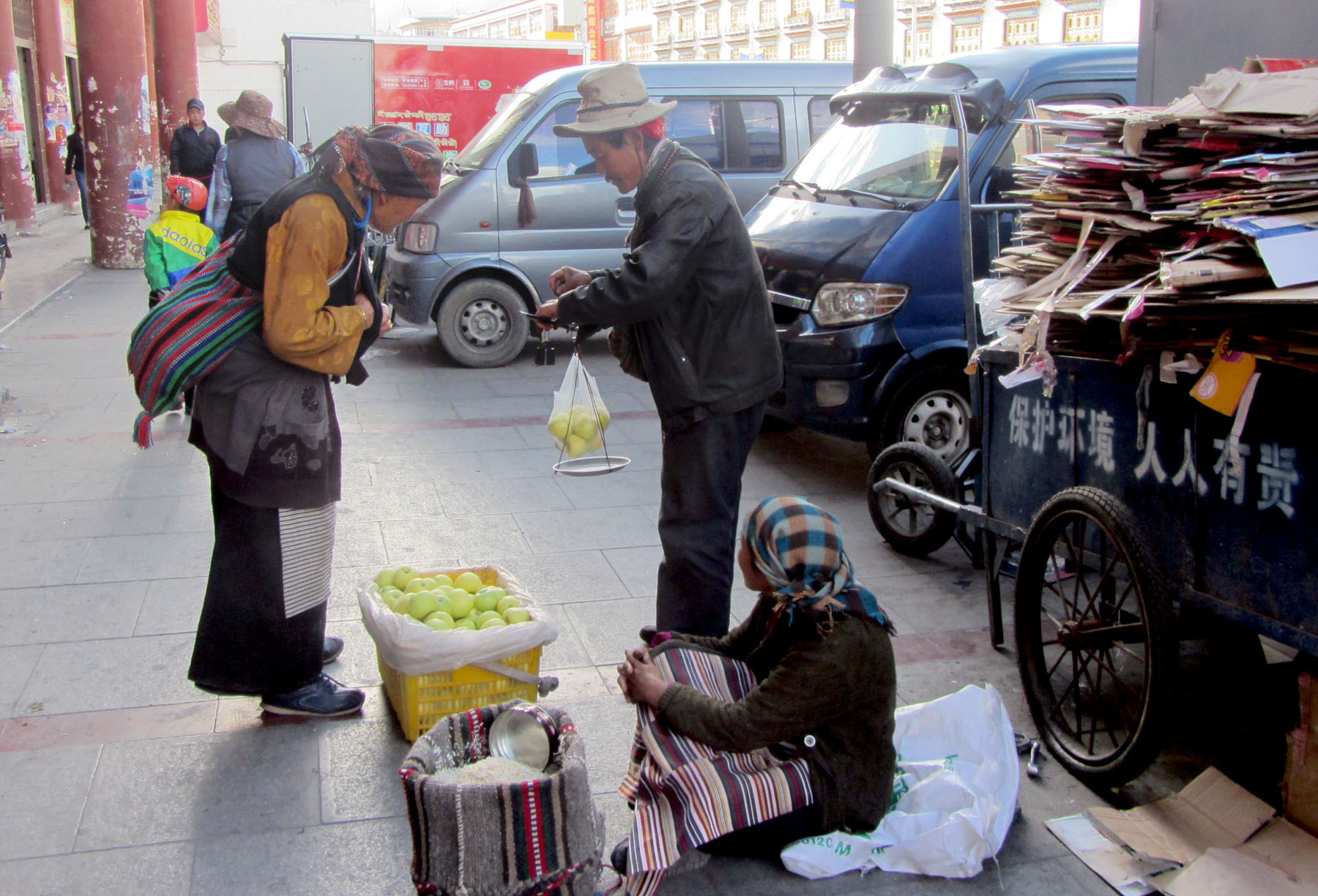
Street peddlers are a relatively common sight across Asia

The hybrid approach offers a choice within a range of scripts. This approach is neither prescribed nor totally flexible. It provides a range of scripts from which employees select an option with which they feel comfortable.

== See also ==
- Account-based marketing
- Advertising management
- Brand
- Consumer behaviour
- Marketing
- Marketing mix
- Sales management

=== Types of direct salesperson ===
- Arabber
- Bazaari
- Costermonger
- Hawker (trade)
- Huckster
- Merchant
- Peddler
- Street vendor

=== Influential salesmen and sales theorists ===
- Dale Carnegie - author and lecturer; proponent of salesmanship, public speaking and self-improvement
- E. St. Elmo Lewis - salesmen for NCR and developer of the AIDA model of selling
- Thomas J. Watson -salesman at NCR and CEO of IBM; often described as the "greatest American salesman"
- Walter Dill Scott - psychologist and author; wrote a number of books on the psychology of selling in the early twentieth century
- William Thomas Rawleigh -founder of Rawleigh's company with one of the largest travelling salesteams in the United States
