= Huckster =

Vendor, usually with biased information and pushy or showy tactics

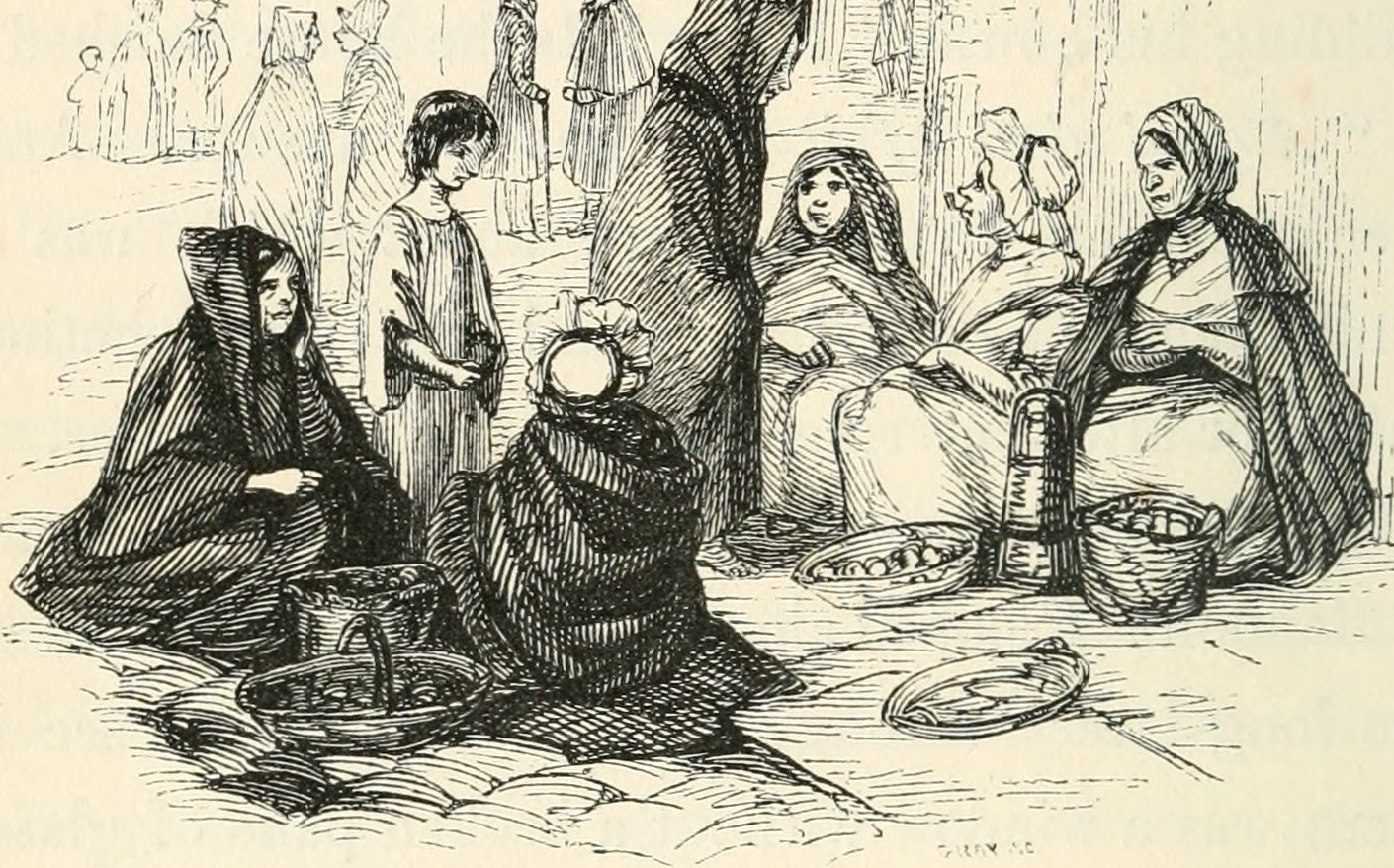
Women huckstering from The Irish Sketch-Book, 1845

A huckster is anyone who sells something or serves biased interests, using pushy or showy tactics. Historically, it meant any type of peddler or vendor, but over time it has assumed pejorative connotations.

== Etymology ==
The original meaning of huckster is a person who sells small articles, either door-to-door or from a stall or small store, like a peddler or hawker. The term probably derives from the Middle English hucc, meaning "to haggle". The word was in use circa 1200 as "huccsteress". During the medieval period, the word assumed the feminine word ending "ster" as in huckster, reflecting the fact that most hucksters were women. The word assumed various spellings at different times: hukkerye, hukrie, hockerye, huckerstrye or hoxterye. The word was still in use in England in the 1840s, when it appeared as a black-market occupation. It is related to the Middle Dutch hokester, hoekster, and the Middle Low German höker, but appears earlier than any of these. In the United States, a connotation of trickery developed – the huckster might trick others into buying cheap imitation products as if they were the real thing.

== Other meanings ==
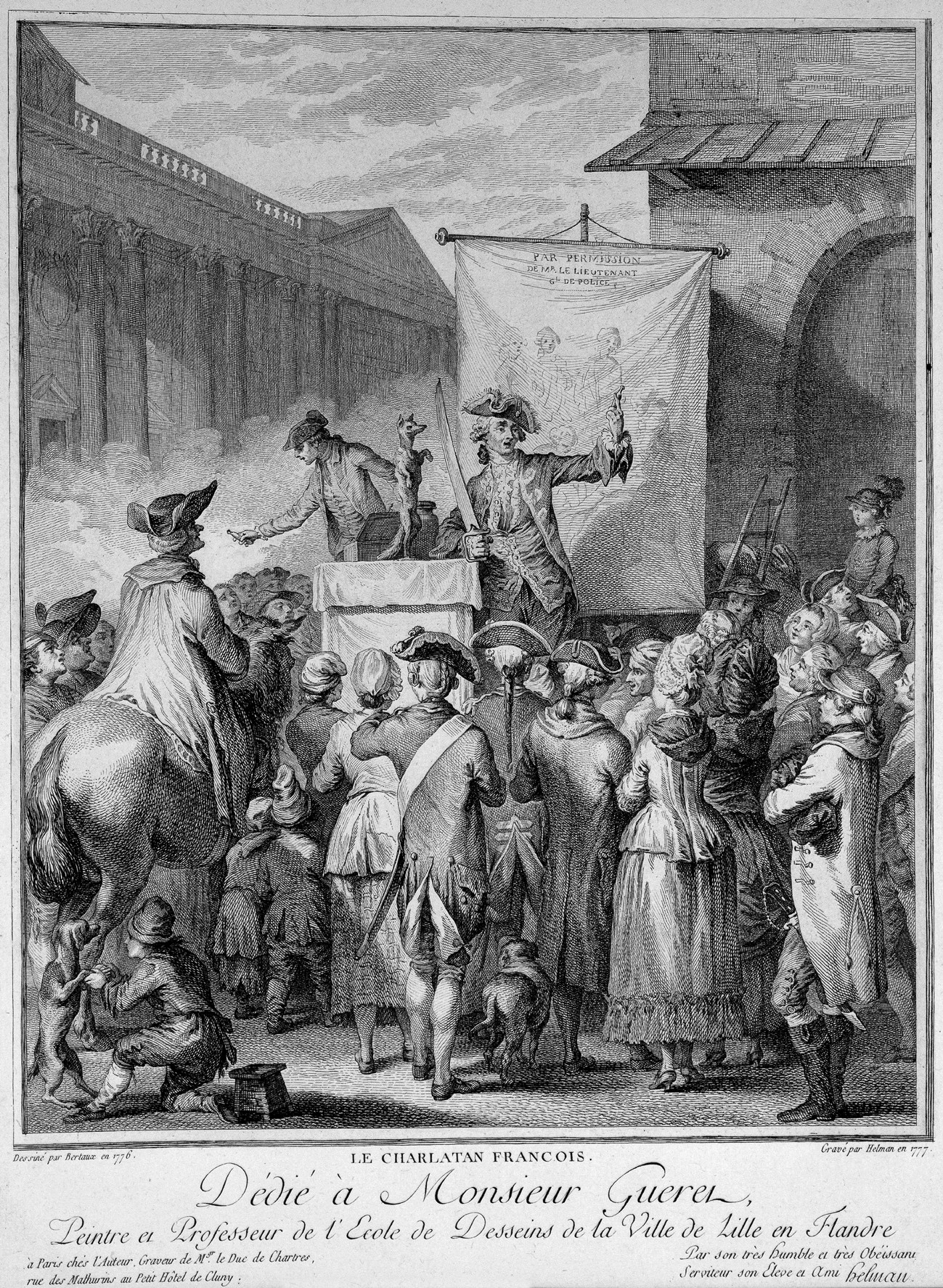
Itinerant medicine salesmen were often known as "hucksters"

The term "huckster" was used in different ways across Europe and later ended up taking on different meanings at different times.

=== In Scotland ===
In Scotland, the term "huckster" referred to a person, usually a woman, who bought goods, watered them down, and resold them in tiny quantity to others who were too poor to buy quality products available at market value. These items tended to be in the poorer quality range, since economy was paramount. Scots burghs often felt the need to control hucksters because they operated without a stall, on the economic fringes. In particular, they were subject to accusations of forestalling, in this case, the practice of buying goods wholesale, "before the stall" and therefore before tax was paid.

=== In England and Continental Europe ===
In England and Continental Europe during the medieval period, the term "huckster" was synonymous with "peddler." Hucksters and peddlers belonged to a broad group of resellers who purchased surplus stocks from weekly provincial markets and fairs and then resold them at larger daily markets or engaged in door-to-door selling.

As time passed, the distinction between hucksters and peddlers became more pronounced. During the medieval period, the term "huckster" came to refer to market-based food vendors, while peddlers referred to itinerant vendors of a wide range of merchandise. Hucksters were often women who dealt in low-priced goods such as meat, poultry, dairy, bread and baked goods, including pies and pastries. They sourced raw materials from their own holdings or purchased goods from other sellers and carried their products to the market place in baskets or on their heads. These women either lived in the market town or travelled into the market place from the surrounding area. Hucksters were at the bottom of the market hierarchy, both in terms of wealth and status, since they made only small returns.

Luca Clerici has made a detailed analysis of Vicenza’s food market during the sixteenth century. He found that there were many different types of reseller operating out of the markets. For example, in the dairy trade, cheese and butter was sold by the members of two craft guilds (i.e., cheesemongers who were shopkeepers) and that of the so-called "resellers" (hucksters selling a wide range of foodstuffs), and by other sellers who were not enrolled in any guild. Cheesemongers’ shops were situated at the town hall and were notably lucrative. Resellers and peddlers increased the number of sellers, thus increasing competition, to the benefit of consumers. Direct sellers, who brought produce from the surrounding countryside, sold their wares through the central market place and priced their goods at considerably lower rates than cheesemongers.

=== In 20th-century Philadelphia ===
Hearing Before the Special Committee on Aging. United States Senate, 107th United States Congress. First Session. Washington, D.C. Serial No. 107-14.

In Philadelphia, in the early 1900s, hucksters were seen as primarily men who came around with carts, horse or hand-drawn, of fresh produce. They made their presence known by crying out loud what they had to offer. In earlier Philadelphia dialect, to say "like a huckster" meant to be too loud in one's speech.

== In literature and popular culture ==
The story "The Goblin and the Grocer" by Hans Christian Andersen implies that human nature is attracted to a state of happiness as represented by poetry and to sensual pleasure as represented by jam and butter at Christmas. Although the story has been mistakenly called "The Goblin and the Huckster", it has nothing to do with that term (pejoratively). The Grocer, through his haggling and bargaining, is seen as industrious because he possesses the jam and butter (sensual pleasure), and the student is seen as poor but happy because he appreciates the beauty of poetry above all else. Meanwhile, the Grocer's talkative wife and the cask in which are stored old newspapers both have plenty of authoritative knowledge to share but are paid little attention compared to the primal desires of humankind, which constantly compete for (the goblin's) attention.

In the novel "The Black Stallion" by Walter Farley, the supporting character Tony is described as a huckster, in the sense that he works as a vegetable salesman in New York City's smaller streets, selling from a horse-drawn cart.

In science fiction fandom, the term "huckster" is used non-pejoratively to designate dealers in science fiction–related books, magazines and paraphernalia, particularly those who deal at science fiction conventions.

In the song "There Only Was One Choice" by Harry Chapin one line refers to huckster of belief.

In the 2022 song “Sweet Nothing” by Taylor Swift, she refers to “smooth-talking hucksters.”

== Popular references ==
- The Hucksters (1947), an American film starring Clark Gable as a slick Madison Avenue advertiser.

== See also ==
- Arabber
- Costermonger
- Direct sales
- Hawker (trade)
- History of marketing
- Market (place)
- Market town
- Merchant
- Peddler
- Personal selling
- Quackery
- Retail
- Street vendor
