= AISDALSLove =

Hierarchy of effects model in advertising

AISDALSLove (standing for Attention, Interest, Search, Desire, Action, Like/dislike, Share, and Love/hate), is an hierarchy of effects model in advertising adapted from AIDA's hierarchy of effects model (Lewis, 1900; Strong, 1925) which has been used by many researchers, both academicians and practitioners, to measure the effect of an advertisement.

This concept of AISDALSLove model was introduced by Bambang Sukma Wijaya in the International Seminar on Scientific Issues and Trends (ISSIT) in 2011 and published in the International Research Journal of Business Studies (IRJBS) in 2012, titled "The Development of Hierarchy of Effects Model in Advertising".

The hierarchy of effects model AISDALSLove can be described as 'A' for Attention (the stage where the consumer audience firstly pay attention to the ad), 'I' for Interest (stage at which the consumer audience then become interested in that ad), 'S' for Search (the stage where the consumer audience will seek for information about the message or the advertised brand, both internally and externally). 'D' for Desire (the stage where the consumer audience have a passion towards the brand or product after getting information about the brand or additional information regarding the advertising message), 'A' for Action (stage at which the consumer audience take action in form of purchase of products or the election of a brand to satisfy his/ her desire), 'L' for Like/ dislike (the stage where after experiencing a product or brand, the consumer audience will like or dislike towards that product). 'S' for Share (this stage is a continuation from the previous stage, in which the consumer audience will express feelings of likes or dislikes by sharing their experience to other consumers directly or through media), and the last is 'Love' for Love/hate (the stage when after feeling satisfied or not satisfied, the consumer audience share their experiences with others, and generate long-term feelings towards the product or brand, these feelings can be either love or hate).

== New ideas and elements ==
As mentioned in his paper, Wijaya put special attention on concept of AIDA (Attention, Interest, Desire, Action) model, considering this model is the most popular, widely used in studies to measure the effect of advertising, as well as inspiring the birth of new hierarchy of effect models. Barry & Howard (1990: 101) stated that so important was the AIDA formulation at the turn of the century that Strong (1925) estimated that 90% of persons engaged in selling and the vast majority of advertising and selling textbooks fully endorsed the Lewis-Sheldon hierarchical framework.

In addition, the development of information technology has radically changed the way of how people communicate and socialize; as well as a paradigm shift from product-oriented marketing to consumer-oriented marketing or people-oriented marketing. These developments eventually change our perspective in viewing advertising effects.

The advertising effects are no longer as simple as Attention, Interest, Desire and Action or added with Satisfaction as developed by Strong (1925). This is due to more critical public or potential customers who can no longer be dictated to by advertising information. The advertisement may be interesting, but not enticing enough to create a passion to purchase the advertised product. Therefore, the variables in the hierarchy of effects model needs to be updated in response to the latest developments in the respect of the public power as a consumer audience.

Apart from the development in stages by adding 'S' (Search) element, 'L' (Like/dislike), 'S' (Share) and 'Love' (Love/hate), in the AISDALSLove model, Wijaya carried out grouping of advertising effect to short-term effect and long-term effect, especially related to development of the advertised brand. Therefore, AISDALSLove model is more in line with the paradigm shift in advertising from selling-oriented to branding-oriented.

New elements in AISDALSLove model are described as follows:

Search (S) According to Wijaya, this element refers to the assumption that today's consumers are increasingly critical. Information obtained from an advertisement is not accepted instantly to become a belief or directly create a desire to purchase, no matter how interesting the displayed stimulus by the advertising message. Consumers will complete the obtained information or stimulus with other information before they decide to buy. Information search is the process by which we survey the environment for appropriate data to make a reasonable decision (Solomon, 2011: 337). The process of information search includes internal and external search.

Like/Dislike (L) This element is closely related to consumers' experience after purchasing and using the product due to being tempted by the advertisement. If consumers like the product, then consumers usually feel satisfied and afterward do the next action, such as make a repurchase or reorder. Satisfaction is an attitude-like judgment following a consumption experience (Lovelock and Wirtz, 2011: 74). The resulting judgment is labeled positive disconfirmation if the product or service is better than expected, negative disconfirmation if it is worse than expected, and simple confirmation if it is as expected (Oliver, 1997; Lovelock & Wirtz, 2011).

In short, consumers evaluate product or service performance through their experience by comparing what they expected and imagined versus what they perceive they received from a particular supplier. Thus, an unpleasant experience, not consistent with the promise delivered by the ads will lead to resentment with the product and usually the consumer decides not to try it again. The extreme importance of the 'Like/Dislike' effect in the post-purchase stage has made Sheldon (1919) complete the AIDA's effect stage with 'S', which is 'Satisfaction'. Meanwhile, Rogers called it 'Confirmation', and Bovee et al. named it 'Reinforcement'. The consumer's experience may cause the next snowball effect, which is sharing the experience with others about the advertised product.

Share (S) In an age where the world is becoming increasingly borderless by the late development of information technology, consumers have the power to perform radical actions that may cause impact to the brand image of a product. This is based on like and dislike experience toward the product they have used. Meanwhile, the law of small numbers in the consumer's decision-making process, whereby people expect information obtained from a small sample to be typical of the larger population (Tversky and Kahneman, 1971; Hoyer and Macinnis, 2010) more strengthening the assumption of the role of consumer experience sharing in influencing other consumers.

If friends say that a new hand phone by a particular group is really good or that the food at a particular restaurant is terrible, we believe that information, even if most people do not feel that way. In fact, reliance on small numbers is another reason that word-of-mouth communication can be so powerful. We tend to have confidence that the opinions of friends or relatives are more reflective of the majority than they may actually be.

Moreover, with the growing users of digital social media today, make the consumers become freer in expressing their experience to the world. Therefore, the key for brands is to empower consumers by delivering an exceptional experience that inspires them to share their stories (Davila, 2011). A recent study indicates that word of mouth via social media, product review sites, etc. where consumer share their experiences is what drives business results. Apart from the form of storytelling in blogs, consumers also share their experience in the form of letter to the editor in many mass media, updated status in many social media such as Facebook and Twitter, upload video on YouTube, interpersonal rumors in hangout places, product review in certain websites, broadcast messages in messenger facilities and inbox, spamming and hoax, as well as information and comments posting in mailing lists and social media walls.

Love/Hate (Love) Long-term effect of an ad is love or hatred of consumers to the advertised brand or product. A consumer, who has already interested to purchase a product after being influenced by the ad's messages (visual or verbal), and feel satisfied after a 'simple confirmation' or even 'positive disconfirmation', then share the experience and express his/her satisfaction towards the products he has been tried, eventually will create a deep feeling to the brand, that is called 'Love' for good feeling or 'Hate' for bad feeling.

== Pyramid of Love ==
Pyramid Of Love

Some degrees of love towards brand were also proposed by Wijaya through this concept of AISDALSLove, namely Pyramid of Love starts from hate, neutral, good perception, good experience, good feeling, brand liking, brand fans, brand obsession, to deep feeling (love) on the top (Wijaya, 2011: d-13).

A love can also arise due to connection between consumers with story or creative advertising concept. This connection can be presented through in depth understanding of consumers through customer insight. Supported by a good brand experience, this connection becomes stronger over time so that creates brand loyalty and sense of belonging to the advertised brand. There is no better way to build such a similarly long-lasting brand loyalty than by continually nurturing brand relationship in order to ensure that brand and consumer remain connected (Wijaya, 2009).

On the contrary, if the consumer experience towards the advertised product has a negative disconfirmation, the consumer will spread rumor to other consumers or society at large with the intention that impact to a bad perception of a product. Instead of love and loyal to a brand, consumer become resentful and may possibly express such hatred in various ways.

That is why advertisers should not focus only on short-term effects of advertising, which raises purchase action, but also consider long-term effect, namely loyalty to the brand which came from good experience on brand and good image about the brand product. As a result, according to Wijaya, in planning advertising and marketing communication, advertisers should be very careful in presenting 'what to say' and 'how to say' about their branded product.

== See also ==
- Advertising management
- Advertising research
- Brand awareness
- Brand management
- DAGMAR (marketing)
- Consumer behaviour
- Integrated marketing communications
- Marketing research

=== Advertising models ===
- Overview of theories of advertising effects
- AIDA (marketing)
- DAGMAR marketing
- Elaboration likelihood model (article)
- Elaboration likelihood model (section)
