= Geographic targeting =

Resources allocation to eradicate poverty

Geographic targeting is a viable way for resource allocation, especially to alleviate poverty in a country. In this context, public expenditure and policy interventions can be deployed to reach the neediest people in the poorest areas.

Geographical targeting for poverty alleviation employs a variety of techniques, such as database, and geographic information systems to construct poverty maps.
