= Brand awareness =

Consumer awareness among household

Brand awareness is the extent to which customers are able to recall or recognize a brand under different conditions. Brand awareness is one of the two key components of brand knowledge, as defined by the associative network memory model. It plays a vital role in consumer behavior, advertising management, and brand management. The consumer's ability to recognize or recall a brand is central to the purchasing process because buying decisions cannot begin unless a consumer is first aware of a product category and a brand within that category showing that the brands name must be known Awareness does not necessarily mean that the consumer must be able to recall a specific brand name, but they must be able to recall enough distinguishing features for a purchase to happen.

Brand awareness consists of two components: brand recall and brand recognition. Several studies have shown that these two components operate in fundamentally different ways as brand recall is associated with memory retrieval, and brand recognition involves object recognition. Both brand recall and brand recognition play an important role in consumers' purchase decision process and in marketing communications. Brand awareness is closely related to concepts such as the evoked set and consideration set which include the specific brands a consumer considers in purchasing decision. Consumers are believed to hold between three and seven brands in their consideration set across a broad range of product categories. Consumers typically purchase one of the top three brands in their consideration set as consumers have shown to buy only familiar, well-established brands.

As brands are competing in a highly globalized market, brand awareness is a key indicator of a brand's competitive market performance. Given the importance of brand awareness in consumer purchasing decisions, marketers have developed a number of metrics designed to measure brand awareness and other measures of brand health. These metrics are collectively known as Awareness, Attitudes and Usage (AAU) metrics.

To ensure a product or brand's market success, awareness levels must be managed across the entire product life cycle – from product launch to market decline. Many marketers regularly monitor brand awareness levels, and if they fall below a predetermined threshold, the advertising and promotional effort is intensified until awareness returns to the desired level.

== Importance of brand awareness ==
Brand awareness is related to the functions of brand identities in consumers' memory and can be measured by how well the consumers can identify the brand under various conditions. Brand awareness plays an important role in the consumer's purchasing decision-making process that tends to sustainable business growth and loyalty. Strong brand awareness can be a predictor of brand success. Brand awareness is strengthened by its brand-related associations such as the consumers' evaluation of the brand and their perceived quality of the brand. A brand has a strong position when first consumers have a frame of reference or goal they can expect to achieve when using the brand, and second a point of difference or an indication that their selected brand is superior in achieving the goal.

Brand awareness is a key indicator of a brand's market performance. Brands competing in a highly globalized market invest in global advertising and distribution to compete for consumers' attention and awareness. Marketers regularly monitor brand awareness levels. If these levels fall below a predetermined threshold, the advertising and promotional effort is intensified until awareness returns to the desired level. In marketing planning and brand management, it is important to set objectives to promote brand awareness to motivate consumers to purchase a given brand's products.

Brand identity includes the visible and experiential elements that distinguish a brand from others, such as its name, logo, design, messaging and customer experience. It may also include the values, positioning and associations that an organization seeks to communicate to its target audience In brand management, a distinction is often made between individual visual identifies, such as a logo, and the broader set of associations that shape how a brand is perceived.

Brand awareness is one of the major brand assets that adds value to the product, service or company. Investing in building brand awareness can lead to sustainable competitive advantages, thus, leading to long-term value.

== Brand equity ==
Brand equity is the sum of assets and liabilities relating to a brand, its name and logo, and the sum or difference is the value that is offered by the product or service or a company or the company's customers. For the assets and liabilities to have effect on brand equity, they have to be related to the name or logo of the brand. If the brand's name or logo changes, then, it can either have a positive or a negative impact on the assets and liabilities of the brand, with some of them getting transferred to the new name and logo. The brand equity stands on the assets and liabilities and it can differ from factor to factor such as, brand loyalty, brand name awareness, how a customer perceives the quality of a brand, and other proprietary assets such as patent and trademark. Research indicates that brand equity is a resource for a company to pull from strategically to connect with its consumer-base.

== Types of brand awareness ==
Brand awareness is divided into two components: brand recall (also known as unaided recall or occasionally spontaneous recall) and brand recognition (also known as aided brand recall). These types of awareness operate in entirely different ways with important implications for marketing strategy and advertising.

=== Brand recall ===
Brand recall is also known as unaided recall or spontaneous recall and refers to the ability of the consumer to correctly generate a brand from memory when prompted by a product category. So, for example, a person is thinking about laundry and writes down Tide on their shopping list. Brand recall is a retrieval component based on the strength of association between a brand and other relevant information stored in long-term memory. When prompted by a product category, most consumers can only recall a relatively small set of brands, typically around 3–5 brand names. In consumer tests, few consumers can recall more than seven brand names within a given category and for low-interest product categories, most consumers can only recall one or two brand names. Competitive brand advertising can suppress awareness of other brands, as exposure to advertising positively influences brand recall.

Research suggests that the number of brands that consumers can recall is affected by both individual and product factors including; brand loyalty, brand knowledge, situational and usage factors, and education level. For instance, consumers who are highly experienced with a given product category or brand may be able to recall a slightly larger set of brand names than those who are less experienced with a given product category or brand.

=== Brand recognition ===
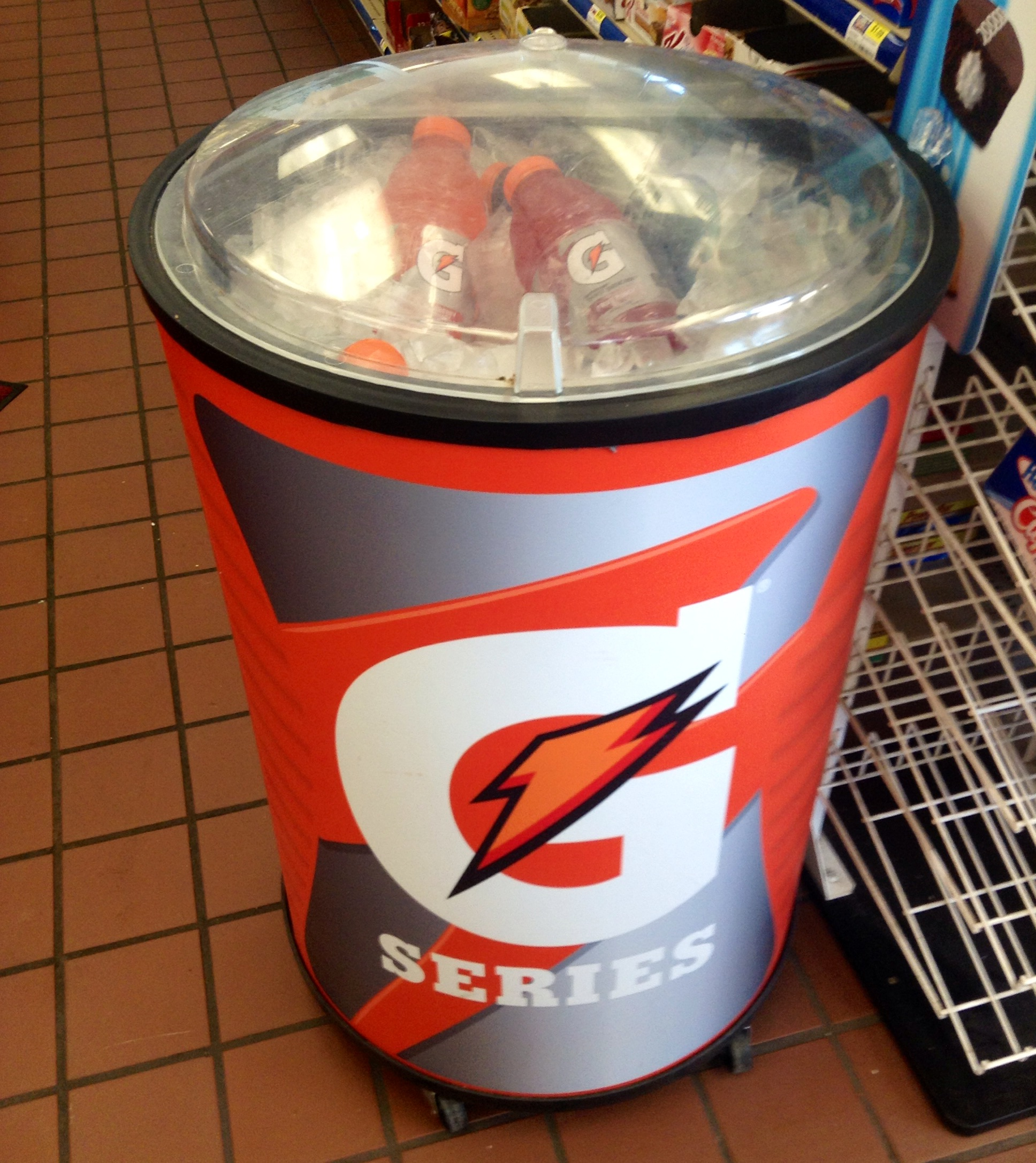
Consumers recognize a brand by name or visual packaging causing association with a category or category need.

Brand recognition is during the point of purchase when a person recognizes a brand and associates it with a product category or category need. So an example would be a customer seeing a Gatorade, associating it with a sports drink and putting it in their cart because their son has a soccer game. Brand recognition is also known as aided recall and refers to the ability of the consumers to confirm that they have seen or heard of a given brand before. This does not necessarily require that the consumers have to identify the brand name. Instead, it means that consumers can recognize the brand upon presentation, either at the point-of-sale or after viewing its visual packaging. In general people are more likely to recognize a brand than to recall one. It is 8 to 10 times more difficult to recall a brand than recognize one. For example, when you identify a brand you may associate that brand with a product category, but when given the same product category your memory may not trigger the same brand identifier.

=== Top-of-mind awareness ===
Consumers will normally purchase one of the top three brands in their consideration set. This is known as top-of-mind awareness. Focusing on brand awareness and gaining brand equity, companies work to achieve an increased probability that consumers will include the brand in their consideration sets.

By definition, top-of-mind awareness is "the first brand that comes to mind when a customer is asked an unprompted question about a category." When discussing top-of-mind awareness among larger groups of consumers (as opposed to a single consumer), it is more often defined as the "most remembered" or "most recalled" brand name(s).

A brand that enjoys top-of-mind awareness will generally be considered as a genuine purchase option, provided that the consumer is favorably disposed to the brand name. Top-of-mind awareness is relevant when consumers make a quick choice between competing brands in low-involvement categories or for impulse type purchases.

=== Marketing implications of brand awareness ===
Brand awareness is closely related to the concepts of the evoked set (defined as the set of brands that a consumer can elicit from memory when contemplating a purchase) and the consideration set (defined as the "small set of brands which a consumer pays close attention to when making a purchase decision"). One of the central roles of advertising is to create both brand awareness and brand image, in order to increase the likelihood that a brand is included in the consumer's evoked set, or consideration set, and regarded favorably. Brand image is how consumers perceive a brand based on the various things they associate the brand with.

Consumers do not learn about products and brands from advertising alone. When making purchase decisions, consumers acquire information from a wide variety of sources in order to inform their decisions. After searching for information about a category, consumers may become aware of a larger number of brands which collectively are known as the awareness set. Thus, the awareness set is likely to change as consumers acquire new information about brands or products. A review of empirical studies in this area suggests that the consideration set is likely to be at least three times larger than the evoked set. Repetition of a brand name upon a consumer's consciousness, for example through advertising, will make them more comfortable with a brand. By increasing awareness, presumably consumers keep a brand in their evoked set, increasing the probability of a brand's purchase. However, awareness alone is not sufficient to trigger a purchase, consumers also need to be favorably disposed to a brand before it will be considered as a realistic purchase option.

The process of moving consumers from brand awareness and a positive brand attitude through to the actual sale is known as conversion. Brand attitude takes into consideration a consumer's experience, knowledge, beliefs and feelings about a brand and affects their loyalties and identity. Identity relates to any category label (i.e. woman, student, or athlete) that a consumer associates with that has an impact on consumer behavior. While advertising is an excellent tool for creating awareness and brand attitude, it usually requires support from other elements in the marketing program to convert attitudes into actual sales. Other promotional activities, such as telemarketing, are vastly superior to advertising in terms of generating sales. Accordingly, the advertising message might attempt to drive consumers to direct sales call centers as part of an integrated communications strategy. Many different marketing tactics can be used to convert brand purchase intention into accelerated short term sales such as offering coupons, refunds and rebates, sampling, sweepstakes, contests and premiums. For common, repeat-purchase decisions consumers choose a brand first based on brand awareness, pricing, and packaging, but then evaluate the product after purchase. Without this previous exposure, buyers must resort to other criteria when making a purchase decision, so sampling, for example, can be used to create conversion. When consumers cannot rely on brand awareness to make a purchase decision they will take advantage of the opportunity to sample, and even if the consumer has a previous bias or distortion of a brand from advertising or word-of-mouth, their perception of quality will be unaffected when given the opportunity to sample.

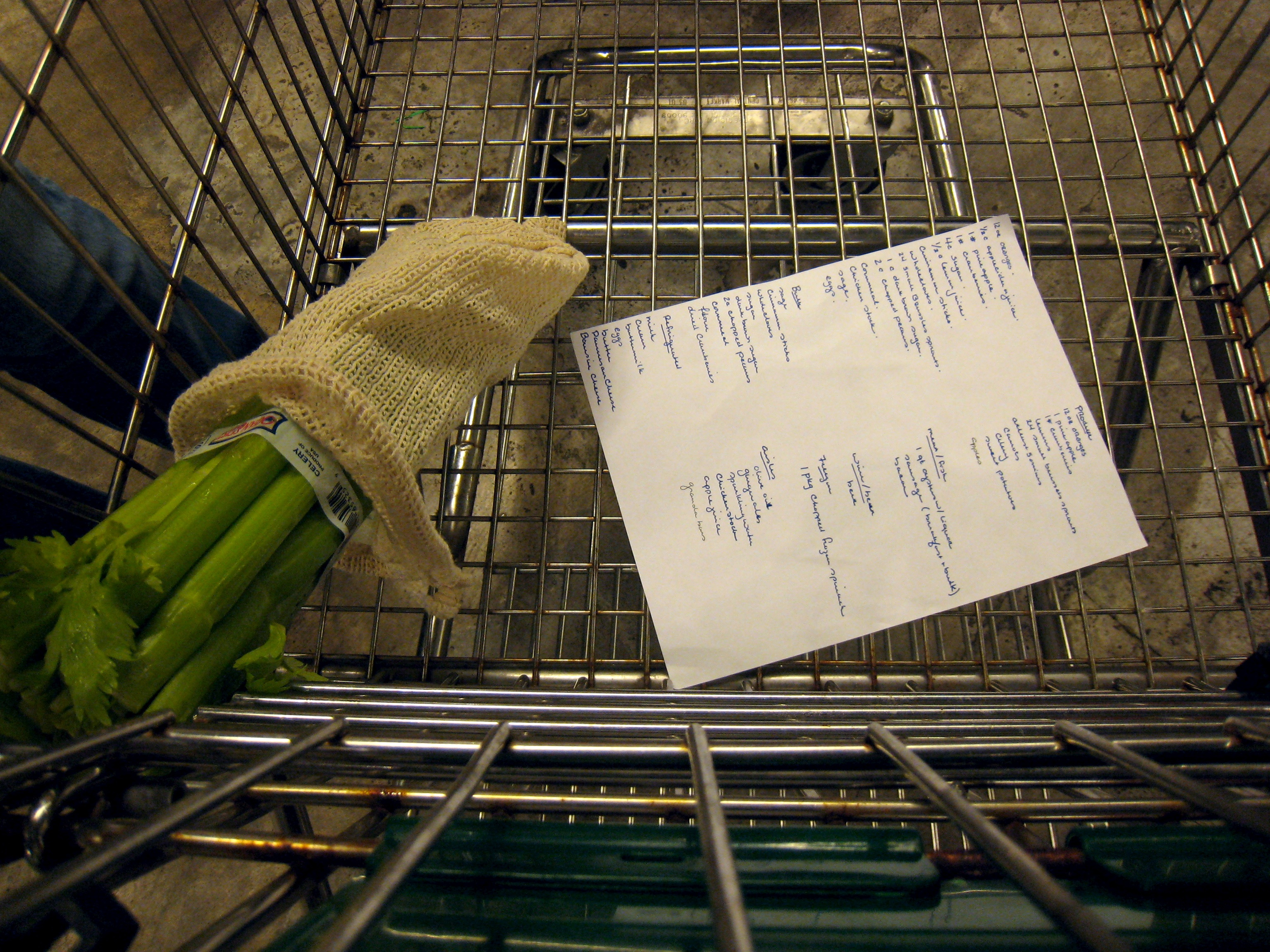
Percy and Rossiter argue that very few shoppers use lists and this has important implications for the purchase decision and advertising strategy.

Percy and Rossiter (1992) argue that the two types of awareness, namely brand recall and brand recognition, operate in fundamentally different ways in the purchase decision. For routine purchases such as fast moving consumer goods (FMCG), few shoppers carry shopping lists. For them, the presentation of brands at the point-of-sale acts as a visual reminder and triggers category need. In this case, brand recognition is the dominant mode of awareness. For other purchases, where the brand is not present, the consumer first experiences category need then searches memory for brands within that category. Many services, such as home help, gardening services, pizza delivery fall into this category. In this case, the category need precedes brand awareness. Such purchases are recall dominant, and the consumer is more likely to select one of the brands elicited from memory. When brand recall is dominant, it is not necessary for consumers to like the advertisement, but they must like the brand. In contrast, consumers should like the ad when brand recognition is the communications objective.

The distinction between brand recall and brand recognition has important implications for advertising strategy. When the communications objectives depend on brand recognition, the creative execution must show the brand packaging or a recognizable brand name. However, when the communications objectives rely on brand recall, the creative execution should encourage strong associations between the category and the brand. Advertisers also use jingles, mnemonics and other devices to encourage brand recall.

Brand dominance occurs when, during brand recall tests, most consumers can name only one brand from a given category. Brand dominance is defined as an individual's selection of only certain brand names in a related category during a brand recall procedure. While brand dominance might appear to be a desirable goal, overall dominance can be a double-edged sword.

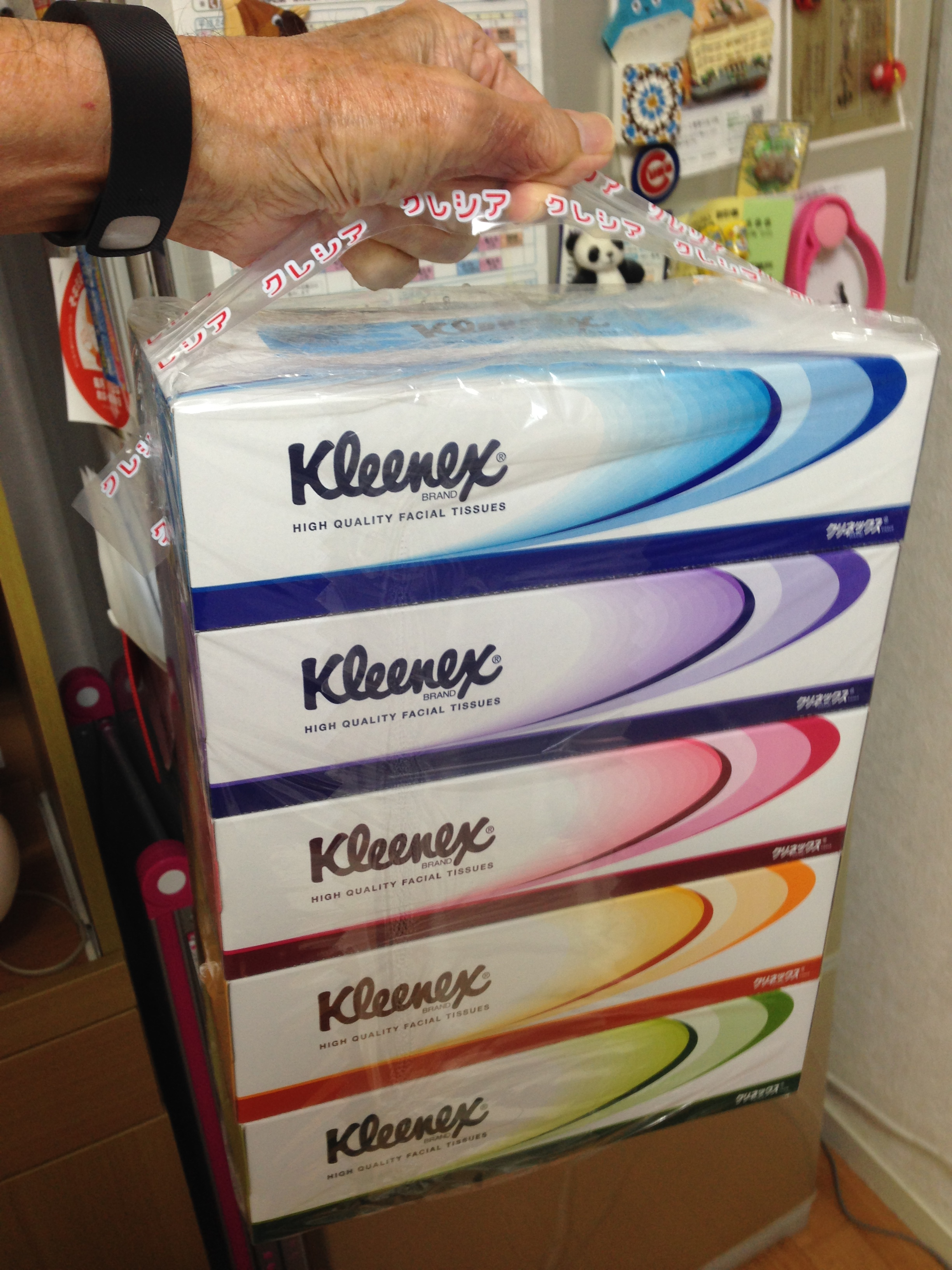
When a brand name becomes so well known that the brand becomes synonymous with the category, the brand is said to have 'gone generic'.

A brand name that is well known to the majority of people or households is called a household name and may be an indicator of brand success. Occasionally a brand can become so successful that the brand becomes synonymous with the category. For example, British people often talk about "Hoovering the house" when they actually mean "vacuuming the house". (Hoover is a brand name). When this happens, the brand name is said to have "gone generic". Examples of brands becoming generic abound; Kleenex, Sellotape, Nescafé, Aspirin and Panadol. When a brand goes generic, it can present a marketing problem because when the consumer requests a named brand at the retail outlet, they may be supplied with a competing brand. For example, if a person enters a bar and requests "a rum and Coke", the bartender may interpret that to mean a "rum and cola-flavoured beverage", paving the way for the outlet to supply a cheaper alternative mixer. In such a scenario, The Coca-Cola Company is the ultimate loser because it does not get the sale.

== Measuring brand awareness ==
Just as different types of brand awareness can be identified, there are a variety of methods for measuring it. Typically, researchers use surveys conducted on a sample of consumers asking about their knowledge of the focus brand or category.

Two types of recall test are used to measure brand awareness:

- Unaided recall tests: In these tests, the respondent is presented with a product category and asked to nominate as many brands as possible. They aren't given any clues or cues. Unaided recall tests are used to measure brand recall.
- Aided recall tests: In these tests, the respondent is prompted with a brand name and asked whether they have seen or heard about it. In some aided recall tests, the respondent might also be asked to explain what they know about the brand e.g. to describe package, color, logo or other distinctive features. Aided recall tests are used to measure brand recognition.

In addition to recall tests, brand research often employs a battery of tests, such as brand association tests, brand attitude, brand image, brand dominance, brand value, brand salience and other measures of brand health. Although these tests do not explicitly measure brand awareness, they provide general insights about brand health and are often used in conjunction with brand recall tests.

Brand salience is closely associated with brand awareness. It measure various aspects of brand awareness such as the likelihood of a brand to stand out to a consumer under various circumstances. To measure brand salience, for example, researchers place products on a shelf in a supermarket, giving each brand equal shelf space. Consumers are shown photographs of the shelf display and asked to name the brands they noticed. The speed at which consumers nominate a given brand is an indicator of brand's visual salience. This type of research can provide valuable insights into the effectiveness of packaging design and brand logos.

Metrics used to measure brand effects are collectively termed AAU metrics (Awareness, Attitudes and Usage).

== Brand awareness and the hierarchy of effects ==
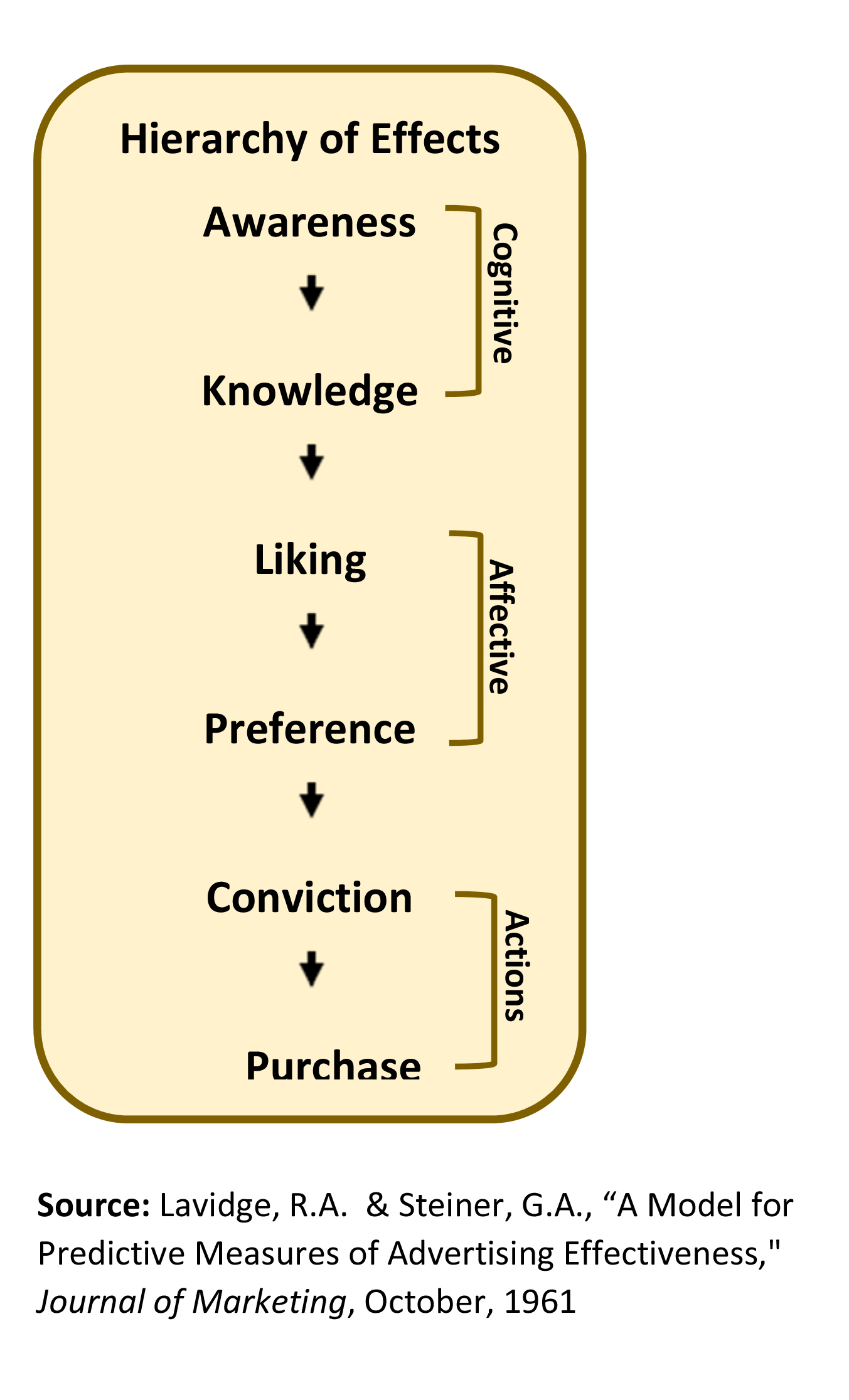
Basic Hierarchy of Effects Model (after Lavidge, 1961)

Brand awareness is a standard feature of a group of models known as hierarchy of effects models. Hierarchical models are linear sequential models built on an assumption that consumers move through a series of cognitive and affective stages, beginning with brand awareness (or category awareness) and culminating in the purchase decision. In these models, advertising and marketing communications operate as an external stimulus and the purchase decision is a consumer response.

A number of hierarchical models can be found in the literature including DAGMAR and AIDA. In a survey of more than 250 papers, Vakratsas and Ambler (1999) found little empirical support for any of the hierarchies of effects. In spite of that, some authors have argued that hierarchical models continue to dominate theory, especially in the area of marketing communications and advertising.

The hierarchy of effects developed by Lavidge in the 1960s is one of the original hierarchical models. It proposes that customers progress through a sequence of six stages from brand awareness through to the purchase of a product:

Stage 1: Awareness – The consumer becomes aware of a category, product or brand (usually through advertising)

↓

Stage 2: Knowledge – The consumer learns about the brand (e.g. sizes, colors, prices, availability etc.)

↓

Stage 3: Liking – The consumer develops a favorable/unfavorable disposition towards the brand

↓

Stage 4: Preference – The consumer begins to rate one brand above other comparable brands

↓

Stage 5: Conviction – The consumer demonstrates a desire to purchase (via inspection, sampling, trial)

↓

Stage 6: Purchase – The consumer acquires the product

Hierarchical models have been widely adapted and many variations can be found, however, all follow the basic sequence which includes Cognition (C)- Affect (A) – Behavior (B) and for this reason, they are sometimes known as C-A-B models. Some of the more recent adaptations are designed to accommodate the consumer's digital media habits and opportunities for social influence.

Selected alternative hierarchical models follow:

Basic AIDA model: Awareness→ Interest→ Desire→ Action

Modified AIDA model: Awareness→ Interest→ Conviction →Desire→ Action

AIDAS Model: Attention → Interest → Desire → Action → Satisfaction

AISDALSLove model: Awareness→ Interest→ Search →Desire→ Action → Like/dislike→ Share → Love/ Hate

Lavidge et al's Hierarchy of Effects: Awareness→ Knowledge→ Liking→ Preference→ Conviction→ Purchase

DAGMAR Model: Awareness → Comprehension → Attitude/ Conviction → Action

Rossiter and Percy's communications effects: Category Need → Brand Awareness → Brand Preference (A_{b}) → Purchase Intent→ Purchase Facilitation

=== Marketing Implications of hierarchical models ===
It should be evident that brand awareness constitutes just one of six stages that outline the typical consumer's progress towards a purchase decision. While awareness is a necessary precondition for a purchase, awareness alone cannot guarantee the ultimate purchase. Consumers may be aware of a brand, but for different reasons, may not like it or may fail to develop a preference for that brand. Hence, brand awareness is an indicator of sales performance, but does not account for all sales performance. For these reasons, marketers use a variety of metrics, including cognitive, affective and behavioral variables, to monitor a brand's market performance.

As consumers move through the hierarchy of effects (awareness→ knowledge→ liking→ preference→ conviction→ purchase), they rely on different sources of information to learn about brands. While main media advertising is useful for creating awareness, its capacity to convey long or complex messages is limited. In order to acquire more detailed knowledge about a brand, consumers rely on different sources such as product reviews, expert opinion, word-of-mouth referrals and brand/ corporate websites. As consumers move closer to the actual purchase, they begin to rely on more personal sources of information such as recommendations from friends and relatives or the advice of sales representatives. For example, the opinion of an influential blogger might be enough to shore up preference/conviction while a salesperson might be necessary to close the actual purchase.

The purchase funnel indicates that awareness is a necessary precondition for purchase.

All hierarchical models indicate that brand awareness is a necessary precondition to brand attitude or brand liking, which serves to underscore the importance of creating high levels of awareness as early as possible in a product or brand life-cycle. Hierarchical models provide marketers and advertisers with basic insights about the nature of the target audience, the optimal message and media strategy indicated at different junctures throughout a product's life cycle. For new products, the main advertising objective should be to create awareness with a broad cross-section of the potential market. When the desired levels of awareness have been attained, the advertising effort should shift to stimulating interest, desire or conviction. The number of potential purchasers decreases as the product moves through the natural sales cycle in an effect likened to a funnel. Later in the cycle, and as the number of prospects becomes smaller, the marketer can employ more tightly targeted promotions such as personal selling, direct mail and email directed at those individuals or sub-segments likely to exhibit a genuine interest in the product or brand.

== Creating and maintaining brand awareness ==
Brand advertising can increase the probability that a consumer will include a given brand in his or her consideration set. Brand-related advertising expenditure has a positive effect on brand awareness levels. Virtually anything that exposes consumers to a brand increases brand awareness. "Repeat brand exposure in stores improves consumers' ability to recognize and recall the brand." Increased exposure to brand advertising can increase consumer awareness and facilitate consumer processing of the included information, and by doing this it can heighten consumers brand recall and attitude towards the brand.

To increase the probability of a product's acceptance by the market, it is important to create high levels of brand awareness as early as practical in a product or brand's life-cycle. To achieve top-of-mind awareness, marketers have traditionally, relied on intensive advertising campaigns, especially at the time of a product launch. To be successful, an intensive campaign utilizes both broad reach (expose more people to the message) and high frequency (expose people multiple times to the message). Advertising, especially main media advertising, was seen as the most cost efficient means of reaching large audiences with the relatively high frequency needed to create high awareness levels. Nevertheless, intensive advertising campaigns can become very expensive and can rarely be sustained for long periods. Alhaddad (2015) indicates that advertising awareness plays as a good source of meaning and identity for a brand by enhance brand awareness and brand image in social media

As new products enter the market growth stage, the number of competitors tends to increase with implications for market share. Marketers may need to maintain awareness at some predetermined level to ensure steady sales and stable market share. Marketers often rely on rough and ready 'rules-of-thumb' to estimate the amount of advertising expenditure required to achieve a given level of awareness. For instance, it was often held that to increase brand awareness by just one per cent, it was necessary to double the dollars spent on advertising.

When a brand becomes established and attains the desired awareness levels (typically outlined in the marketing plan), the brand advertiser will shift from an intensive advertising campaign to a reminder campaign. The objective of a reminder campaign is simply to keep target audiences aware of the brand's existence and to introduce new life into the brand offer. A reminder campaign typically maintains broad reach, but with reduced frequency and as a consequence is a less expensive advertising option. Reminder advertising is used by established brands, often when they are entering the maturity stage of the product lifecycle. In the decline stage, marketers often shift to a caretaker or maintenance program where advertising expenditure is cut back.

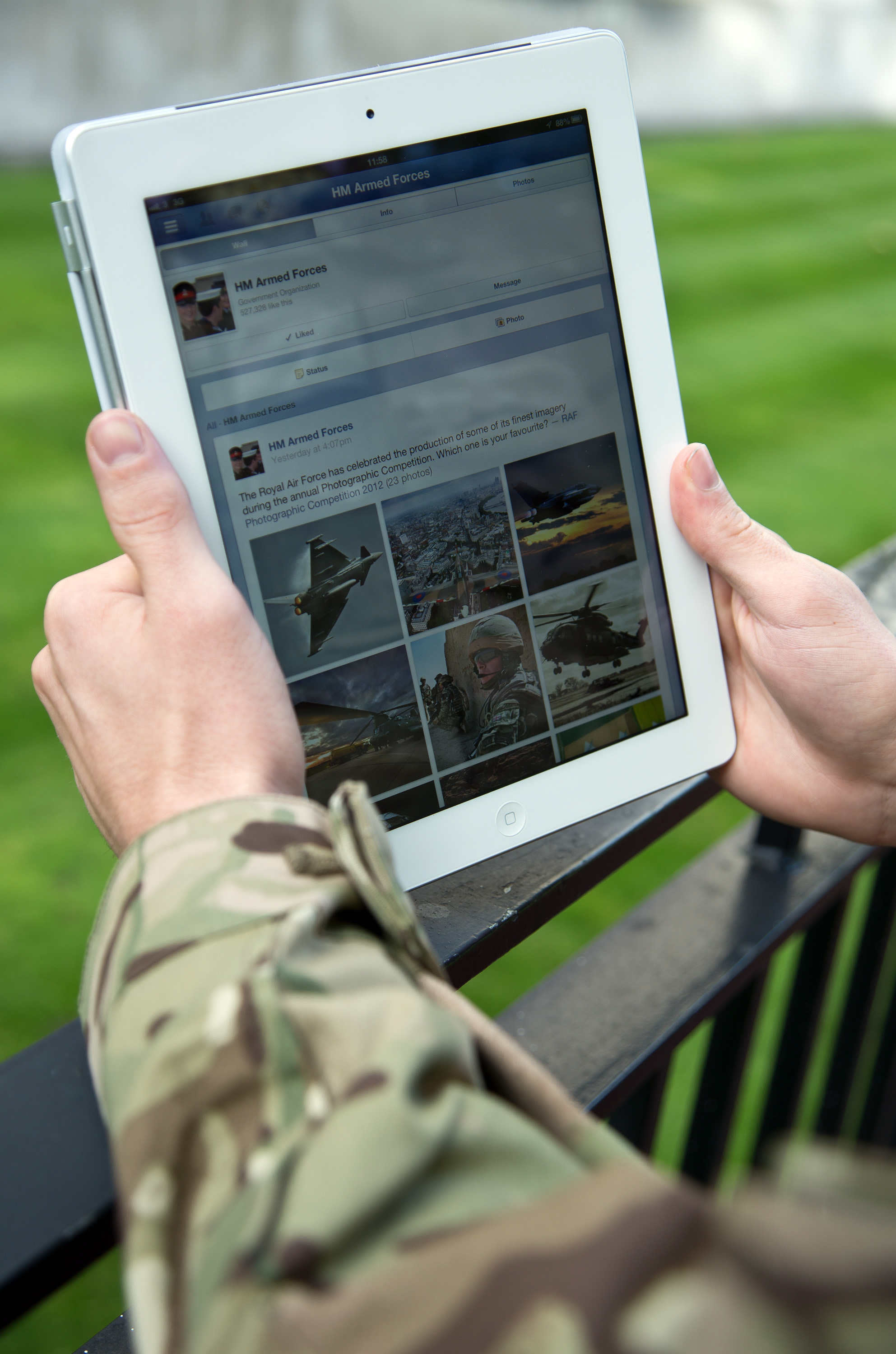
The rise of digital media and social networks is changing the way that consumers search for product information.

While advertising remains important for creating awareness, a number of changes in the media landscape and to consumer media habits have reduced the reliance on main media advertising. Instead, marketers are seeking to place their brand messages across a much wider variety of platforms. An increasing amount of consumer time and attention is devoted to digital communications devices—from computers and tablets through to cellphones. It is now possible to engage with consumers in a more cost efficient manner using platforms such as social media networks that command massive audiences. For example, Facebook has become an extremely important communications channel. Moreover, social media channels allow interactive communications with greater opportunities for brands to connect with audience members. Consequently, the consumer journey has evolved into an omnichannel experience, where a vast majority of shoppers conduct online research to build brand awareness and evaluate products before executing a purchase, whether online or in a physical retail environment.

In contrast to traditional media where consumers passively receive content, new media allows consumers to participate in the communication process. There are three types of participatory behaviors: passively consuming content, actively contributing to content, and actively creating content. Shares, likes, reviews and user-generated content (UGC) generate awareness making marketing campaigns more authentic and relatable. Furthermore, brands can generate information by analyzing psychographic and behavioral information from audience profiles to target consumers and effectively improve their advertisement or communications strategy.

The rise of social media networks has increased the opportunities for opinion leaders to play a role in brand awareness. In theory, anyone can be an opinion leader e.g. celebrities, journalists or public figures, but the rise of the digital environment has changed our understanding of who is a potentially useful influencer. Indeed, the digital environment has created more opportunities for bloggers to become important influencers because they are seen as accessible, authentic and tend to have loyal followings. Bloggers have become key influencers in important consumer goods and services including fashion, consumer electronics, food and beverage, cooking, restaurant dining and bars. For example, a survey by Collective Bias showed that when it comes to product endorsements digital influencers are more popular than celebrities. Findings showed that only 3% of participants said they would consider buying a celebrity-endorsed item, in comparison to 60% who said they had been influenced by a blog review or social media post when shopping. For marketers, the digital landscape has made it somewhat easier to identify social influencers.

== Popular examples of brand advertising and promotion ==
The following examples illustrate how brand awareness and brand advertising are used in practice.

=== Coca-Cola "Share a Coke" campaign ===
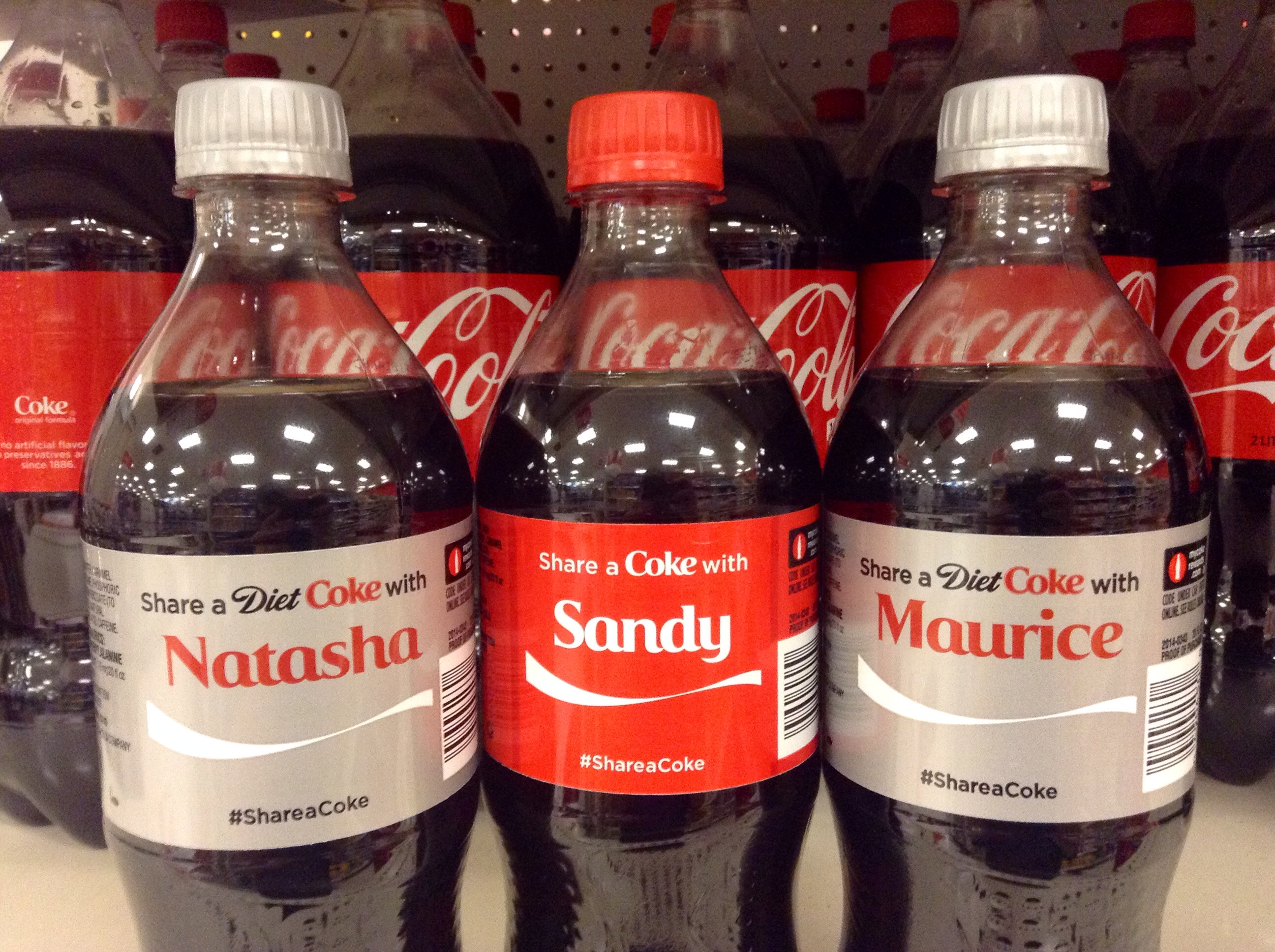
The "Share a Coke" campaign received multiple "Creative Effectiveness" awards at the Cannes Lions International Festival of Creativity.

Coca-Cola launched a campaign which became known as "Share a Coke", with the campaign objectives; "to strengthen the brand's bond with Australia's young adults – and inspire shared moments of happiness in the real and virtual worlds." The campaign, originally launched in Australia and was subsequently rolled out to other countries.

The concept was to introduce personalized Coke bottles or cans. Popular names were written in a 'look-alike Spencerian script' which is part of the Coke brand's distinctive brand identity. The campaign organisers seeded social media by targeting "opinion leaders and influencers to get them to […] lead the conversation and encourage others to seek out 'Share a Coke' for themselves". Within days celebrities and others with no connection to Coke were spreading the concept across social networks. The campaign extended the audience reach as more people were exposed to the messages. According to Coke's creative team, "That [Australian] summer, Coke sold more than 250 million named bottles and cans in a nation of just under 23 million people". This campaign helped Coke extend its awareness across a broader age profile as they interacted with each customer on a personal level.

=== Ronald McDonald and other anthropomorphic brand characters ===
Consumers experience few difficulties assigning a personality to a brand and marketing communications often encourage consumers to think about brands as possessing human characteristics. When brands are infused with human-like characteristics, it can assist in communicating a brand's values and creating distinctive brand identities that serve to differentiate an offering from competing brands. "In an increasingly competitive marketplace, [some] companies rely on brand characters to create awareness, convey key product/service attributes or benefits, and attract consumers" (Keller, 2003).

The use of anthropomorphic characters has a long history. For example, the Michelin man, employed as a memorable character to sell Michelin car tires, was introduced as early as 1894. These characters benefit the brand by creating memorable images in the consumer's mind while conveying meanings that are consistent with the brand's values.

McDonald's created a similar anthropomorphic brand character known as Ronald McDonald as part of its brand identity. For younger consumers, Ronald McDonald injects a sense of fun and mystery into the McDonald's brand. For parents, the character clearly signals that McDonald's is a family friendly venue. Characters help to carry the brand's identity and can be seen as non-human "spokes-character", contributing to a strong brand differentiation. The likeability of the brands character can "positively influence attitudes towards the brand and increase [consumers'] purchase intention"

== See also ==
- Advertising management – creating brand awareness is the primary function of advertising
- Attitude-toward-the-ad models
- Brand – creating and maintaining high levels of brand awareness is one of the primary functions of brand management
- Consumer behaviour – detailed overview of how consumers move from awareness through to the actual purchase
- Marketing management
- Product life-cycle management (marketing) – explains how levels of brand awareness change over a product's life cycle
- Purchase funnel – explains how brand awareness changes as different segments of the market begin to adopt a product or brand
