= DAGMAR marketing =

Model for measuring advertising effectiveness

Defining Advertising Goals for Measured Advertising Results, abbreviated DAGMAR, was an advertising model proposed by Russel H. Colley in 1961.

== Details ==
According to DAGMAR, each purchase prospect goes through four steps:

1. Awareness
2. Comprehension
3. Conviction
4. Action

These steps are also known as the ACCA advertising formula. ACCA/DAGMAR is a descendant of the AIDA advertising formula and considered to be more comprehensive than AIDA. Developed to measure advertising effectiveness, it maps the states of mind that a consumer passes through. Carol Kopp from Investopedia.com describes the DAGMAR model as also requiring "an evaluation of the campaign's success against a pre-set benchmark".

Important parts of the DAGMAR model are definitions of the target audience (people whom the advertising message is addressed to) and objectives (goals of the advertising message).

== See also ==
- AIDA (marketing)
- AISDALSLove Model
