= E. St. Elmo Lewis =

American advertising writer (1872–1948)

- Born: Elias St. Elmo Lewis; March 23, 1872; Philadelphia, Pennsylvania, U.S.
- Died: March 18, 1948 (aged 75); St. Petersburg, Florida, U.S.
- Education: University of Pennsylvania
- Occupation: Advertising advocate
- Parents: Enos Rees; Mary Bartram Lewis

Elias St. Elmo Lewis (March 23, 1872 – March 18, 1948) was an American advertising advocate. He wrote and spoke prolifically about the potential of advertising to educate the public. He was inducted into the Advertising Hall of Fame posthumously, in 1951. He is the author of the AIDA marketing model.

== Biography ==
Lewis was born in Philadelphia on March 23, 1872, the son of Enos Rees and Mary Bartram Lewis. He descended on maternal side from John Bannister Gibson and John Bartram, on paternal side from the same family as Meriwether Lewis. His middle name, St. Elmo, was derived from the eponymous novel by Augusta Jane Evans published in 1866. Lewis was educated at North Broad Street Select School in Philadelphia, later renamed Eastburn Academy after its founder, then at the University of Pennsylvania where he edited the University Courier in 1893 and 1894. In 1895, he was the editor of an arts publication called Moods, and business manager of Footlights, A Clean Paper for the Theatre Goer while also acting as a junior partner and business manager for a printing company.

Lewis founded an advertising agency in 1896 called The Advertisers' Agency which was located in the old Penn Mutual Building in Philadelphia. Its business slogan - "Ask Lewis about it" - gained proverbial fame. He took charge of the diphtheria antitoxin advertising of the H. K. Mulford Company in 1896. The Advertisers' Agency established branch offices during the first half of 1897, first in Buffalo, then in Detroit. The Buffalo office was headed by Frank Fellows, formerly employed by The Charles H. Fuller Company. Charles J. Shearer, former advertising manager to Strawbridge & Clothier in Philadelphia, became President of The Advertisers' Agency in July 1897, while Lewis retained his old position as General Manager. In July 1901, Lewis was selected by the Peirce School in Philadelphia to conduct the Peirce School of Advertising. In that year, The Advertisers' Agency was succeeded by E. St. Elmo Lewis, Incorporated with a capital stock of $50,000. Lewis resigned from his company in November 1902 and sold all his stock holdings a year later. Lewis worked at the National Cash Register Company from 1902 to 1903. E. St. Elmo Lewis, Inc. was eventually dissolved in 1906.

In September 1903, Lewis joined the staff of The Book-Keeper as assistant general manager and as general managing editor of the journal. In 1904, that company published his book The Credit Man and His Work, which lists him as "Fellow The International Accountants Society, Inc." and "Managing Editor 'The Business Man's Magazine'". No reference can be found to him having worked as a "credit man" (manager).

He then became the advertising manager for Burroughs Adding Machine Company (manufacturer of the first widely used calculator) from 1905 to 1914. In June 1910, Lewis was elected president of the newly founded National Association of Advertising Managers at their first regular meeting at Hotel Pontchartrain in Detroit. He had conceived the idea of forming a select organization of advertisers as early as Summer 1908 and wrote a letter to Alfred Darlow, advertising manager of the Union Pacific Railroad Company, to ask for his cooperation. In September 1914, he became vice-president and general manager of the Art Metal Construction Company in Jamestown, New York. Lewis joined the Campbell Ewald Co. as advertising and sales counsel in December 1915. He was associated with that company until 1926.

Afterwards, Lewis worked for National Services, Inc. in Detroit as counsellor in consumer and trade relations, and, as of 1931, as vice-president and editorial director of the Keystone Publishing Company in Philadelphia. In 1932, Lewis joined a newly formed organization called Advisory Management Corporation in Philadelphia as chief of staff of the marketing division. In early 1937, he was asked by the Evansville Co-Operative League, an organization of large industrial firms in Evansville, Indiana, to outline a community program and platform.

Lewis was married to Maude Rose Wherry. In the early 1940s, the couple moved from Detroit to St. Petersburg, Florida, "on doctors' orders", as the Highway Traveler noted in 1946, "to take care of an overworked heart." He died there on March 18, 1948. Maude Rose survived her husband by 28 years. She died on March 31, 1976.

== Advertising principles ==
Since 1925 when The Psychology of Selling and Advertising by Edward K. Strong Jr. was published, it became commonplace to attribute the authorship of the AIDA model to Lewis. According to Strong, Lewis formulated the slogan "attract attention, maintain interest, create desire" in 1898, adding later the fourth term "get action".

The following table summarizes Lewis' evolving idea concerning the principal functions of advertising:

Year	Model	Source
1899	to catch the eye of the reader, to inform him, to make a customer of him	The Western Druggist, 21 (February), p. 66
1903	attract a reader, interest him, convince him	The Book-Keeper, 15 (February), p. 124
1908	attract attention, awaken the interest, create the conviction	Financial Advertising, Indianapolis: Levey Bros. & Co.
1909	attract attention, awaken the interest, persuade / convince	The Bankers' Magazine, 78 (April), pp. 710–711

The earliest, rudimentary discussion of advertising principles appeared in a column which Lewis wrote for The Inland Printer under the pen name "Musgrove". In the August 1897 issue he stated:

The first law of ad. composition should be, as in the making of a picture: Have a point on which the attention is to be concentrated and render every other portion of the ad. display subordinate to that.

A quote in the December 1897 issue of Fame - A Journal for Advertisers provides further evidence that Lewis reflected about advertising principles even prior to 1898:

E. St. Elmo Lewis writes in the Advertiser and Publisher (Syracuse): "If I can't catch my reader's attention with my caption, and then write the rest so as to hold it, I'll stop. The logic of a multiplicity of display lines is false."

Two elements from the 1898 slogan were already present, "attract attention" and "maintain interest" (=sustained attention, see below).

In his book Financial Advertising Lewis gave the subject the most detailed treatment. Its appearance was scheduled for Fall 1907, but was postponed when a financial crisis, the so-called Panic of 1907, hit the United States. From the initially planned 600 pages the book grew to almost 1,000 pages. The original components from the 4-part slogan "attract attention, maintain interest, create desire, get action" were scattered around the pertinent chapters on advertising principles. In addition, Lewis used language variants in order to express the same idea, e.g. "create demand" for "create desire", or "hold interest" for "maintain interest". It is therefore convenient to differentiate between the 4-part advertising slogan, which was initially targeted toward an educational audience, and the 3-part advertising model in which variable features are assigned to its components.

"The three elements in any successful advertisement must occur to any man who will analyze the advertisements that have appealed most strongly to him," wrote Lewis at the beginning of his discussion of advertising principles. The first requirement is to attract attention. "If we cannot gain the reader's attention it is manifestly impossible for us to interest or convince him." From this principle Lewis derived two hypotheses, namely that the reader is "attracted in proportion to the strength of the personal appeal to him" and, secondly, "favorable attention is conducive to close attention." In accordance with William James' definition of interest as sustained attention, Lewis postulated furthermore that an attention attractor should "hold the mind long enough to let it [the attention] merge into interest, without the conscious effort of the reader." This constitutes the second component of the model, awaken the interest. As a third requirement, the advertisement "must convince the reader of the reasonableness and correctness of its claims and arguments – it must make him consciously assent to its logic and conclusions." To that principle Lewis assigned the step "get action" from the original slogan. As the advertisement produces conscious assent, it arouses to action. A classic strategy to "get action at once" is to furnish the advertisement with a coupon which the reader is required to fill out. "The coupon is to advertising what the ready order-blank and fountain pen are to the salesman."

Later, as a result of changing market conditions in the early 20th century, Lewis placed special emphasis on the third stage of his advertising slogan in an article titled "Make 'm Buy Cars":

Today we are on the eve of another era of education in advertising. Manufacturers are going out among the great mass of people who refused to be stampeded by the cry of the past hour - and their advertising is going to create desire in the minds of careful folks, and the sales force is going to be organized and educated to cash in on that desire.

The influence of Harvard professor William James on Lewis was profound. The idea of mental states merging into each other can be traced back to James' concept of the "stream of consciousness" in general and his distinction between "substantive" and "transitive states of mind" in particular. Having introduced this idea into advertising theory marks Lewis' lasting contribution, regardless of which elements were added later to the model or in which order the elements were arranged. Apart from this, James' influence extends to Lewis' terminological usage as well (e.g. "mental machinery" and others).

In retrospect, Lewis wrote about his career in the advertising business:

For a good many years, I have been interested in the whole merchandising, selling and advertising field from the consumer's standpoint. Way back in 1898 I urged the development of advertising, merchandising and selling plans on the basis of consumer research, because I believed long ago with Ruskin that the end and purpose of production was consumption, and, inasmuch as the art of consumption was a far more difficult art than production, I urged that the consumer devote more time to the consumption than to the production side of his problem.

== Other work ==
A rather neglected source in the history of organizational behavior is Lewis' book Getting the most out of business. It ran through six editions in the first four years after its appearance in 1915 and was translated into French in 1923. Based on a series of twelve articles written for The Caxton under the title "The New Gospel of Efficiency", he reformulated in this work the ideas of the Efficiency Movement in a systematic manner. Lewis contrasted the schools of scientific management by Frederick Winslow Taylor and Harrington Emerson and called for the "development of the whole man for the whole business":

The emotional and temperamental sides of the Thinker and Doer are just as much facts to be reckoned with in business as the items in the physical inventory, therefore, the individuality of the unit must be recognized.

In 1911, Lewis gave a speech before the American Bankers Association, titled "The Savings Idea and the People", advocating that savings bankers adopt a policy of "aggressive conservation", wherein they recognize that in order to make savings a national trait, they must acknowledge that "they are here as an economic necessity, representing the principle of the conservation of human effort, and that in order to conserve they have a duty for which they must fight, educate, plead and teach the people..."

== Anecdotes ==
The March 1905 issue of Ad sense narrates the story of how Lewis' life was once threatened by an unknown "would-be-murderer":

Several weeks ago some illy disposed person sprinkled arsenic in the food which was being served in the Alhambra cafe and several deaths were nearly recorded. Just about the time that Mr. Lewis and the rest of the residents of the Alhambra Flats had succeeded in getting most of the poison out of their systems, they again had their lives placed in jeopardy by the unknown assassin, who this time resorted to fire as a means of accomplishing his hellish purpose. Providence again intervened, and Mr. Lewis and his fellow residents escaped with their lives and several pair of pajamas. All personal property, however, was destroyed by the fire, and the managing editor of the Business Man's Magazine was so unfortunate as to lose his magnificent French bulldog.

== Selected bibliography ==
=== Books ===
- The Heart of It (1897), Philadelphia: The Advertiser's Press [contains theory and practice of drug advertising]
- Publicity for Printers (1899), Winchester: The Enterprise Printing Company [under the pen name "Musgrove"]
- The Credit Man and his Work (1904), Detroit: The Book-Keeper Publishing
- Financial Advertising (1908), Indianapolis: Levey Bros. & Company
- Efficient Cost Keeping (1914), Detroit: Burroughs Adding Machine Company (3rd edition)
- Getting the Most Out of Business (1915), New York: The Ronald Press
- A Special Training Course for Chevrolet Service and Parts Managers (1935), Chicago: Argus Press
- Going to make a Speech? (1936), New York: The Ronald Press

=== Journal articles ===
- "The Struggle for Publicity", The Spatula, 1897–1898
- "Side Talks about Advertising" (February 1899), The Western Druggist, 21, 65–66
- "Advertising It", The Spatula, 1901
- "Advertising Department: Catch-Line and Argument" (February 1903), The Book-Keeper, 15, 124–128
- "The Duty and Privilege of Advertising a Bank" (April 1909), The Bankers' Magazine, 78, 710–711
- "More Science in Advertising" (January 26, 1910), Printers' Ink, 70, 58–61
- "Developing Exact Knowledge about Advertising" (August 11, 1910), Printers' Ink, 72, 17–19; (August 25, 1910), 65–70
- "Creative Salesmanship" (November 1911), Ford Times, 5, 58–61
- "New Gospel of Efficiency" (1911), The Caxton, 37–38
- "The Six Principles of Scientific Salesmanship" (1916–1917), Engineering Magazine, resp. Industrial Management, Vols. 52–53 [article series in eight parts]
- "Propaganda as a Modern Part of Advertising" (June 1918), Advertising and Selling, 28, 11, 59
- "What if there should be a Brotherhood of Consumers" (June 3, 1920), Printers' Ink, 8–12
- "Making the Advertising Man to See the Customer's Viewpoint" (May 1925), American Industries, 44–45
- "Problems of the Consumer" (1930), Brick Clay Record, 76(8), 519–522
- "A Critique of Consumer Cooperative Theory and Practice" (1937), Annals of the American Academy of Political and Social Science, 191, 192–201
