= TRP scam =

Scam in India

The TRP manipulation scam of 2020 in India involved the alleged inflation by some television channels of their viewership ratings. The investigation was based on a complaint filed with the Mumbai Police. The 70% revenue for television channels coming from advertising highlights the importance of Target Rating Point (TRP) for television channels.

== History ==
In October 2020, Mumbai Police announced that they had received complaints of channels fraudulently inflating their ratings. An investigation was launched into Republic TV's viewership ratings. Fakt Marathi, and Box Cinema TV were also charged in the FIR.

The police conducted an audit into the accounts of ARG Outlier Media Pvt Ltd (owner of Republic TV and Republic Bharat). It showed that the TRPs and viewership of its Hindi channel, Republic Bharat, were high from the first month of its launch in 2016. The police alleged that the channel inflated its ratings by bribing low-income individuals, including people who did not comprehend English, to keep their televisions turned on and tuned to Republic TV. With an inflated TRP, ARG Outlier Media was able to bargain for higher revenue from advertisers. Arnab Goswami denied the allegations and accused the Mumbai Police of retaliating against the channel's recent criticism of their activities.

On 21 October, the investigation became a country-wide case, potentially covering every news channel in India investigated by the Central Bureau of Investigation (CBI). TV Today Network Ltd ( Aaj Tak and India Today) was fined 5 lakh by the Broadcast Audience Research Council (BARC) for viewership manipulation. The Bombay High Court directed TV Today Network to pay a 5 lakh fine, or face coercive steps by the BARC Disciplinary Council (BDC).

On 4 November 2020, it was further complicated when Arnab Goswami was arrested by the Mumbai Crime Branch on an alleged suicide case and sent to judicial custody. On 11 November 2020, the Supreme Court of India granted an interim bail to Arnab Goswami, mentioning that personal liberty must always be upheld, including mention that the Mumbai High Court abdicated its constitutional duty and function as a protector of liberty in this case.

On 5 November 2020, Hansa Group asked the Bombay High Court to rule against the Crime Branch and sought the transfer of the probe to the CBI, claiming that the Mumbai Police Crime Branch had been adopting pressure tactics to coerce its employees to state that a document flashed as "Hansa Report" by Republic TV was a fake document. The plea stated that the petitioners were held at the Crime Branch for long hours and threatened with arrest and were repeatedly pressed to make a false statement. Police officers were listed as respondents in the petition. The Supreme Court of India rejected the plea from the channel to protect its employees from arrest.

On 13 December 2020, Republic TV's CEO Vikas Khanchandani was arrested by Mumbai police. Later on 16 December, he was granted bail by a sessions court. While granting the bail, the court took exception to the haste with which Mumbai Police arrested Khanchandani and expressed displeasure over the manner in which the police chose to arrest him a day before his plea for anticipatory bail was scheduled for hearing.

Republic TV CFO Sundaram got multiple pre-arrest bails.

On 22 June 2021 Mumbai, Police named Arnab Goswami, Republic TV chief, as a participant. The police named Goswami and four others from ARG Outlier Media (that owns Republic TV) in their 1800-page supplementary charge sheet submitted in the Esplanade Metropolitan Magistrate Court.

BARC has renewed their ratings since Week 10 of 2022. This has been undertaken after the industry-wide consultation process which resulted in the Augmented Data Reporting Standards for News and Special Interest genres.

== Closure ==
Unable to produce any legitimate evidence by Mumbai Police as observed by courts previously the court ultimately allowed Mumbai Crime Branch to withdraw the case and bring it to an end with no legitimate proof of Republic TV and Arnab Goswami's alleged involvement in the TRP scam.

== See also ==
- Frequency (marketing)
- Gross rating point
- Reach (advertising)
- Target rating point
