= Asianet =

Asianet may refer to:

- Asianet (TV channel), a Malayalam-language general entertainment channel and television network in India, owned by Jiostar
  - Asianet Plus, a sister general entertainment channel
  - Asianet Movies, a Malayalam-language movies channel
  - Asianet Middle East, the Middle Eastern version of the channel for the Indian disapora
- Asianet News Network, an Indian news media conglomerate (formerly associated with the entertainment channel), owned by Rajeev Chandrasekhar's Jupiter Capital
  - Asianet News, a Malayalam-language news channel
  - Asianet Suvarna News, a Kannada language news channel
- Asianet Satellite Communications, business name Asianet Digital TV, an Indian cable and media company, formerly associated with the TV networks
  - Asianet Mobile TV+, an OTT platform
