= Fake news in India =

Fake news and similar false information (misinformation or disinformation) is fostered and spread across India through word of mouth, traditional media and more recently through digital forms of communication such as edited videos, websites, blogs, memes, unverified advertisements and social media propagated rumours. Fake news spread through social media in the country has become a serious problem, with the potential of it resulting in mob violence, as was the case where at least 20 people were killed in 2018 as a result of misinformation circulated on social media.

== Terminology and background ==
Fake news is defined as stories purporting to be news that are intentionally and verifiably false and has the capacity to misinform and mislead readers. In academic typology, fake news is classified into several forms along the axes of degree of facticity, motivation of deception and form of presentation; it includes satire and parody that have a basis in facts but can mislead when de-contextualised, it includes fabrications and manipulation of information which were created with the intent to deceive or mislead and also includes covert advertising and political propaganda which are aimed to deceive in an organised attempt to influence wider public opinion. The UNESCO Handbook for Journalism Education and Training provides an additional distinction of two forms of fake news, one that is deliberately created with the intention of targeting and causing harm to a social group, an organisation, a person or a country, described as disinformation and the other being simple misinformation that wasn't created for the purpose of causing harm. In India, fake news is predominantly disseminated by homegrown political disinformation campaigns.

== Creators ==
According to newspaper The Telegraph, "a giant chunk of the disinformation is created and highlighted by an ecosystem close to the ruling Bharatiya Janata Party (BJP), the Narendra Modi government, and their supporters. Unsurprisingly, many of these fake claims serve their political interests."

== Disinformation campaigns ==
=== Coronavirus ===
Misinformation related to coronavirus COVID-19 pandemic is in the form of social media messages related to home remedies that have not been verified, fake advisories and conspiracy theories. At least two people have been arrested for spreading fake news about the coronavirus pandemic. To counteract this, over 400 Indian Scientists are working together to debunk false information about the virus, as of 14 April 2020.

Arnab Goswami of Republic TV attained notoriety by portraying an assembly of migrant workers at Bandra railway station demanding from the government to make arrangements for them to return home during the COVID-19 lockdown as an assembly of Muslims gathered purportedly on the orders of the imam of a local mosque in an attempt to deliberately spread the viral infection among Hindus in an act of jihad, following reports of similar accusations of biological terrorism being levied against Muslim vegetable sellers in Uttar Pradesh by the BJP IT cell in the backdrop of a Tablighi Jamaat event in Delhi being classified as a superspreader of the disease, drawing on similar antisemitic tropes of well-poisoning.

=== Citizenship (Amendment) Act 2019 ===
The CAA Protests led to a surge of fake news on social media targeting both protesters and Delhi police. BJP members shared videos falsely claiming that students from Aligarh Muslim University were raising anti-Hindu slogans. The Supreme Court of India urged the government of India to publicise the aims and benefits of the Citizenship Amendment Act to combat fake news. BJP leaders shared a phone number for people to give a missed call to show support, which was misused on Twitter with fake claims about lonely women and free Netflix subscriptions.

Indian security agencies identified about 5,000 Pakistani social media handles spreading fake propaganda about the CAA, including "deep fake videos". Social media platforms employed mediators to curb fake and communal news.

Old pictures and videos were shared on social media, some by prominent personalities, to give a communal spin to the protests. Old images were also used to suggest violence at protest sites. Similarly, old clips of police brutality were reposted and falsely linked to the CAA protests. BJP's IT Cell Head Amit Malviya shared distorted videos misrepresenting anti-CAA protesters as chanting "Pakistan Zindabad" and making inflammatory slogans against the Hindu community.

=== Elections ===
Fake news was very prevalent during the 2019 Indian general election. Misinformation was prevalent at all levels of society during the build-up to the election. The elections were called by some as "India's first WhatsApp elections", with WhatsApp being used by many as a tool of propaganda. As VICE and AltNews write, "parties have weaponized the platforms" and "misinformation was weaponized" respectively.

India has 22 scheduled languages, and vetting information in all of them becomes difficult for multinationals like Facebook, which has only gathered the resources to vet 10 of them, leaving languages like Sindhi, Odia and Kannada completely unvetted, as of May 2019. Nevertheless, Facebook went on to remove nearly one million accounts a day, including ones spreading misinformation and fake news before the elections.

=== Fake news against Pakistan ===
A study by the EU DisinfoLab in 2019 found that "265 fake local news websites in more than 65 countries are managed by Indian influence networks aiming to influence international institutions and sway the public perception of Pakistan." By 2020, the number of such pro-India fake news websites grew to 750 across 116 countries, as revealed in the Indian Chronicles investigation. Prominent examples of fake news-spreading websites and online resources include OpIndia and Postcard News.

According to the BBC News, many of the fake news websites were operated by an Indian company called the Srivastava Group, responsible for anti-Pakistan lobbying efforts in Europe and linked to spreading fake news and propaganda. These websites, which appear as real news sites by copying syndicated news content from other outlets, plant opinion pieces and stories critical of Pakistan from NGO members linked to their network.

The network aims to influence organizations like the UN Human Rights Council and European Parliament, primarily to "discredit Pakistan". In October 2019, it sponsored a trip for far-right European Parliament MPs to Indian-administered Kashmir, where they met Prime Minister Narendra Modi.

Domains operated by the group included "Manchester Times," "Times of Los Angeles," "Times of Geneva," and "New Delhi Times," among others. Their coverage often focuses on issues like secessionist groups, minorities, human rights, and terrorism in Pakistan.

The EU Chronicle, a Srivasta Group website claiming to deliver EU news, was found to have op-ed articles "falsely attributed to their authors, some of them European lawmakers," non-existent journalists, plagiarised text, and content mainly focused on Pakistan. EPToday, another anti-Pakistan news website, was shut down after being exposed by Politico Europe.

The network, aiming to support Indian lobbying interests, resurrected fake personas of dead human rights activists and journalists, impersonated media agencies like The Economist and Voice of America, used European Parliament letterheads, listed fake phone numbers and addresses including the UN, created obscure book publishing companies, registered hundreds of fake NGOs, think tanks, informal groups, and imam organisations, and conducted cybersquatting on Pakistani domains. Most websites had a presence on social media platforms like Twitter.

Following EU DisinfoLab's 2019 report, some domains were closed but later resurrected under new names. Researchers state that the main target of the fake websites' content is not European readers but mainstream Indian news outlets like ANI and Yahoo News India which reuse and republish their material, reaching millions in India.

In 2023, Indian media spread disinformation about a padlocked grave in Hyderabad, India, claiming it was in Pakistan to prevent the dead bodies from being raped. These stories went viral and severely defamed Pakistan.

Mainstream Indian media, including Aaj Tak, News18, and India Today, extensively spread misinformation and fabricated reports about Pakistan during the 2025 India–Pakistan conflict. Many of the fabrications spread by Indian media outlets during the conflict included false claims that India had struck a Pakistani nuclear base, that two Pakistani jets had been downed, that India had damaged or destroyed Karachi's port, that the Pakistani capital, Islamabad, had been captured, that Pakistan's army chief, Asim Munir, may have been arrested, and that militants were taking over Quetta, the capital and largest city of Balochistan province.

Popular Indian right-wing social media accounts on X, such as The Jaipur Dialogues, also encouraged Indians to engage in "information warfare" and spread and amplify any news damaging to Pakistan, regardless of whether it is true or not.

=== Kashmir ===
Misinformation and disinformation related to Kashmir is widely prevalent. There have been multiple instances of pictures from the Syrian and the Iraqi civil wars being passed off as from the Kashmir conflict with the intention of fueling unrest and backing insurgencies.

In August 2019, following the Indian revocation of Jammu and Kashmir's Article 370, disinformation related to whether people were suffering or not, lack of supplies and other administration issues followed. The official Twitter accounts of the CRPF and Kashmir Police apart from other government handles called out misinformation and disinformation in the region. The Ministry of Electronics and Information Technology assisted by getting Twitter to suspend accounts spreading fake inciteful news.

The Indian Army and media houses such as India Today denied various claims such as the Indian Army burning down houses, the deaths of six personnel in cross border firing, and a series of "torture" allegations made by activist Shehla Rashid via Twitter.

On the other hand, The New York Times claimed officials in New Delhi were portraying a sense of normality in the region, whereas "security personnel in Kashmir said large protests kept erupting". The newspaper quoted a soldier Ravi Kant saying "mobs of a dozen, two dozen, even more, sometimes with a lot of women, come out, pelt stones at us and run away." The Supreme Court of India was told by the Solicitor General Tushar Mehta that "not a single bullet has been fired by security forces after August 5", however BBC reported otherwise. The Supreme Court went onto say that the center should make "every endeavor to restore the normalcy as early as possible."

=== Israeli–Palestinian conflict ===
During the Gaza war, social media accounts based in India spread pro-Israeli disinformation, with influencers misrepresenting videos purported to show school girls taken as sex slaves, or Hamas kidnapping a Jewish baby. Fact-checker Pratik Sinha said the "Indian right-wing has made India the disinformation capital of the world". The trend forms part of a wider pattern of fake news in India with an Islamophobic slant, including disinformation on Palestinians coming from the BJP IT Cell, a vehicle of India's governing party, the BJP.

=== 2024 Bangladesh anti-Hindu violence ===
Numerous India-based social media accounts circulated several misleading videos and images about attacks on Bangladeshi Hindus, which were subsequently debunked by several fact-checking organizations. A false report also claimed that the house of Bangladeshi Hindu cricketer Liton Das had been set on fire, which was later debunked. Das himself refuted the claim in a Facebook post.

Quoting BJP leader and current Chief Minister of West Bengal Suvendu Adhikari, several Indian media channels claimed that more than 10 million Bangladeshi Hindus were heading towards India to seek refuge, adding that Bangladesh is becoming an "Islamic State". In an interview given to Al Jazeera, Bangladeshi political analyst Zahed Ur Rahman stated that that Indian media viewed the situation in Bangladesh through "their Islamophobic eye", despite the view in Bangladesh that it was a popular movement.

BNP leader Gayeshwar Chandra Roy also refuted claims made by Indian media that his party is anti-Hindu, asserting that the BNP has been inclusive of all communities in Bangladesh and has consistently supported all religious groups.

Gobinda Pramanik, former president of the Bangladesh National Hindu Grand Alliance, criticized the Indian media, suggesting that they inaccurately portrayed the situation. Pramanik, who was expelled from the organization, become the president of the same organization again after the fall of Sheikh Hasina's government. Later on 7 August, the general secretary of the same organisation, Dr. Mrityunjoy Kumar Roy, stated that Pramanik's statement to the media was false and "extremely insulting and shameful" for the Hindu community of the country and urged him to publicly apologize.

=== Other examples ===
- Imposters posing as army personnel on the social media have been called out by the Indian Army as false news and disinformation.
- As part of the 2016 Indian banknote demonetisation, India introduced a new 2,000-rupee currency note. Following this, multiple fake news reports about "spying technology" added in the banknotes went viral on WhatsApp and had to be dismissed by the government.
- The NaMo app, an app dedicated to Narendra Modi, the Prime Minister of India, was reported to have promoted and spread fake news.

== Modes of distribution ==
=== Social media ===
The damage caused due to fake news on social media has increased due to the growth of the internet penetration in India, which has risen from 137 million internet users in 2012 to over 600 million in 2019. Fake news is also spread through Twitter. and Meta technologies from Facebook and WhatsApp.

== Impact ==
=== Socio-political ===
Fake news is frequently used to target minorities and has become a significant cause of localised violence as well as large scale riots. Engineered mass violence was instigated during the 2013 Muzaffarnagar riots, through a disinformation campaign propagating the love jihad conspiracy theory and circulating a fake news video.

=== Institutional ===
Internet shutdowns are used by the government to control social media rumors from spreading. Ideas like linking Aadhaar to social media accounts were suggested to the Supreme Court of India by the Attorney General.

In November 2019, the Indian ministry of information and broadcasting planned to set up a FACT checking module to counter fake news by continuously monitoring online news sources and social media posts. The module will work on the principles of "Find, Assess, Create and Target" (FACT) and will initially be run by information service officers. By the end of 2019, the Press Information Bureau (under the Ministry of Information and Broadcasting) set up a fact-checking unit focused on verifying news related to the government.

Journalists in Kashmir have faced repeated criminal proceedings, leading to concerns from three UN OHCHR Special Rapporteurs about a "pattern of silencing independent reporting on Jammu & Kashmir through the threat of criminal sanction." They specifically mentioned journalists Gowhar Geelani, Masrat Zahra, Naseer Ganai, and Peerzada Ashiq, reiterating that "general prohibitions on the dissemination of information based on vague ideas, including 'false news' or 'non-objective information' are incompatible with international standards for restrictions on freedom of expression."

The J&K administration released a new Media Policy-2020 on 15 May 2020, stating that "any individual or group indulging in fake news, unethical or anti-national activities or plagiarism shall be de-empaneled besides being proceeded against under law." Writing for EPW, Geeta wrote that the policy would "make citizens passive recipients of the information" disseminated by the government. The Indian Express published an editorial stating that "at a time when democratic political voices remain missing" in the Union Territory, the policy is an "affront, intended to keep control of the narrative of J&K." The Press Council of India stated that the provisions regarding fake news affect the free functioning of the press.

== Countermeasures ==
Fighting fake news

=== Fact checking organisations ===
Fact-checking in India has become a business, spurning the creation of fact-checking websites such as BOOM, Alt News, Factly and SMHoaxSlayer. Media houses also have their own fact-checking departments now such as the India Today Group, Times Internet has TOI Factcheck and The Quint has WebQoof. India Today Group, Vishvas.news, Factly, Newsmobile, and Fact Crescendo (all International Fact-Checking Network certified) are Facebook partners in fact-checking.

Google has introduced a new feature called "About This Result" to combat misinformation. This feature allows users to assess information and understand its source. It is available globally and supports nine Indian languages including Hindi, Tamil, Bengali, Marathi, Gujarati, Telugu, Malayalam, Kannada, and Punjabi. The feature provides additional context, empowering users to make informed decisions about which websites to visit and determine the most useful results.

=== Grassroots measures ===
In some parts of India like Kannur in Kerala, the government conducted fake news classes in government schools. Some say the government should conduct more public-education initiatives to make the population more aware of fake news.

In 2018, Google News launched a program to train 8,000 journalists in seven official Indian languages, including English. The program, Google's largest training initiative in the world, would spread awareness of fake news and anti-misinformation practices such as fact-checking.

=== Countermeasures by social media companies ===
In India, Facebook has partnered with fact-checking websites such as BOOM and Webqoof by The Quint. Following over 30 killings linked to rumours spread over WhatsApp, WhatsApp introduced various measures to curb the spread of misinformation, which included limiting the number of people a message could be forwarded to as well as introducing a tip-line among other measures such as suspending accounts and sending cease-and-desist letters. WhatsApp also added a small tag, forwarded, to relevant messages. They also started a course for digital literacy and came out with full-page advertisements in newspapers in multiple languages. Twitter also took action to curb the spread of fake news such as deleting accounts.

=== Law enforcement ===
In 2022, the Tamil Nadu Government announced formation of a special Social Media Monitoring Centre, under Tamil Nadu Police "to monitor and curb the spread of fake news and misinformation online".

== See also ==
- Indian WhatsApp lynchings
- Tek Fog
- Godi media
- False advertising
- Fake news websites in the United States
- Fake news in the Philippines
