= Republic TV =

Indian right-wing TV news channel

- Country: India
- Broadcast area: Worldwide
- Network: Republic Media Network
- Affiliates: Republic Bharat
- Headquarters: Mumbai, India

Programming
- Language: English
- Picture format: 1080i

Ownership
- Key people: Arnab Goswami
- Sister channels: Republic Bharat; Republic Bangla; Republic Kannada; ARG Outlier Media; Asianet News Network

History
- Launched: 6 May 2017; 9 years ago
- Founder: Arnab Goswami; Rajeev Chandrasekhar

Links
- Website: www.republicworld.com

Availability

Streaming media
- Republic TV live: Live TV
- YouTube: Official Channel
- Hotstar: Live

Republic TV is an Indian right-wing English-language news channel launched in May 2017. It was co-founded by Arnab Goswami and Rajeev Chandrasekhar, before the latter relinquished his stake in May 2019, converting it into an editor controlled company. It has been accused of practicing biased reporting in favour of the ruling Bharatiya Janata Party (BJP); it has broadcast misinformation and Islamophobic rhetoric on multiple occasions. The channel has been convicted of breaching Telecom Regulatory Authority of India rules.

== History ==
=== Background ===
Arnab Goswami resigned as editor-in-chief of Times Now on 1 November 2016, citing editorial differences, lack of freedom and newsroom politics. He hosted the last edition of his show, The Newshour Debate, a fortnight later. This came after the show had been subject to an investigation by Ofcom, the UK broadcasting regulatory authority, in August and September; the investigation had held Times Now guilty of violating the impartiality clause of its broadcast code, stating that Goswami had presented without impartiality, including sometimes not letting his panellists speak at all.

On 16 December, Goswami announced his next venture — a news channel called Republic; the name was later changed to Republic TV in the face of complaints by Subramanian Swamy.

=== Funding ===
Republic TV was funded in part by Asianet (ARG Outlier Asianet News Private Limited), which was primarily owned by Rajeev Chandrasekhar, a then-independent member of Rajya Sabha who had political links with Bharatiya Janata Party (BJP) and was vice-chairman of the National Democratic Alliance in Kerala. Among other major investors were Goswami himself, his wife Samyabrata Goswami, educationists Ramdas Pai and Ramakanta Panda — all of whom invested through SARG Media Holding Private Ltd.

Chandrasekhar resigned from the board, after he officially joined the BJP in April 2018; Goswami purchased back Asianet's shares in May 2019.

=== Recruitments ===
The Wire and Newslaundry had come across an internal memo floated by Chandrasekhar's group that asked for selective recruitment of right-of-center pro-military voices, who were conducive to his ideology.

S. Sundaram, who had served as the CFO for Times Now between 2005 and 2012, was named the Group CFO. Chief Business Officer of Reliance Broadcast Network Vikas Khanchandani, who had earlier stints as Senior Vice President of NDTV, was made the CEO and co-founder of The News Minute, Chitra Subramaniam was appointed as the editorial adviser. Others who joined included senior anchor of Thanthi TV S. A. Hariharan, retired army officer and television personality Gaurav Arya, former chief correspondent from Jammu and Kashmir for Times Now Aditya Raj Kaul, writer and founder-editor of Gentleman, Minhaz Merchant and actor Anupam Kher.

=== Launch ===
The channel was launched on 6 May 2017 as a free-to-air channel through most direct-to-home television in India and cable television operators, alongside over mobile platforms such as JioTV and Hotstar. Reporting on its launch, Business Standard wrote "The company has already hired 300 people, of whom 215 are on board. A state-of-the-art-studio is being built in Mumbai's Lower Parel area."

On 2 February 2019, the channel launched its Hindi language outlet named Republic Bharat.

Republic TV launched a Bengali language news channel, Republic Bangla, on 7 March 2021.

== Notable events ==
=== Press conference ban by Indian National Congress ===
Reporters from the channel have been banned from attending any press conference of the Indian National Congress, citing them being subject to incessantly aggressive attacks by the channel.

=== Defamation ===
In May 2017, parliamentarian Dr Shashi Tharoor filed a civil defamation case in the Delhi High Court against Goswami and Republic TV in connection with the channel's broadcast of news items from 8 to 13 May claiming him to be involved in his wife Sunanda Pushkar's unnatural death. Seeking the channel's response, Justice Manmohan of the High Court noted: "Bring down the rhetoric. You can put out your story, you can put out the facts. You cannot call him names. That is uncalled for."

=== Intellectual property rights infringement lawsuit ===
In May 2017, Bennett Coleman & Co. Ltd. (BCCL) lodged a complaint against Goswami and Prema Sridevi, a journalist with Republic TV, under the Indian Penal Code and Information Technology Act, 2000 accusing them of copyright infringement. BCCL alleged that the two, previously employed with Times Now, that it owns and operates, had used its intellectual property (IP) in telecasting certain audio tapes that were in their possession during their time at the former Channel. Alongside IP infringement, the complaint also alleged the commission of offenses of theft, criminal breach of trust and misappropriation of property, on the two, on multiple occasions days after the channel's launch.

=== Disputes with Self Regulatory Body (NBDA) ===
In 2018, News Broadcasting Standards Authority (NBSA) demanded Republic TV to tender a full-screen apology for use of multiple objectionable words to describe a group of people at a political rally, who were harassing one of his journalists. Republic TV "removed the video from its website and YouTube account" after receiving the complaint but refused to comply with the NBSA order, instead filing an appeal.

Around a year later, it once again asked Republic TV to broadcast a public apology, after the channel declined to cooperate in another case accusing it of violating the standard prohibitions on racial and religious stereotyping, and instead commented on the body being engaged in "intense pseudo-judicial oversight". Republic TV did not abide by the order yet again; incidentally, Goswami was the convener of the committee that drafted the code, years back. Two weeks after, Goswami along with other media-personas formed the National Broadcasting Federation (NBF) as a new regulatory body; this has since nulled the authority of NBSA to regulate Republic TV.

=== Unfair practices ===
In India, the Broadcast Audience Research Council is the industry body responsible for television-audience measurement. The Telecom Regulatory Authority of India received complaints from the News Broadcasters Association against Republic TV alleging that it was violating the telecom authority's broadcast sector regulations with its unfair practices and sought an investigation into it.

According to the complaint, Republic Bharat had declared its genre as English news, but it was appearing in additional genres after registering itself in those genres. For example, in Delhi, the channel was appearing in both English and Hindi news category. Each "impression" that is reported in the TV viewership data, is an individual instance of viewing of the channel, even if it is a fleeting view. When a viewer cycled through the channels, Republic TV would appear twice, giving it double impressions as compared to other channels. Some cable network had set Republic TV as the default channel (i.e. landing channel) displayed whenever the TV was turned on, thereby increasing the impressions. These practices were seen as a deliberate attempt to illegally garner higher Broadcast Audience Research Council ratings and increase viewership.

The complainants, NBA also sought from the Broadcast Audience Research Council that it withhold publishing viewership data for Republic until its unfair practices stopped. The Broadcast Audience Research Council did not act on the request. Subsequently, multiple leading English-language news channels exited from the Broadcast Audience Research Council system. A news network also approached the Delhi high court against the unfair practices by Republic TV to inflate their ratings.

=== Ratings manipulation ===
In October 2020, upon receiving a complaint accusing some channels of fraudulently inflating their viewership ratings, Mumbai Police launched an investigation into Republic TV's viewership ratings. The police allege that the channel inflated its ratings by bribing low-income individuals, including people who did not comprehend English, to keep their televisions tuned to Republic TV; logs of WhatsApp chats between Goswami and the former chief executive of Broadcast Audience Research Council (the agency responsible for measuring TRP) were published to provide further evidence of collusion. The inflated TRP was leveraged to bargain for higher revenues from advertisers.

Goswami denies the allegations and has accused the Mumbai Police of retaliating against the channel's recent criticism of their activities. On 21 October, Central Bureau of Investigation got involved in the investigation, with the case now potentially covering every news channel in India. On 13 December, Republic TV CEO was arrested in Mumbai, before being granted bail.

== Fake news controversies ==
=== Claims of Pakistani support for the Taliban ===
After the Taliban took over Kabul in August 2021, Indian media (including Republic TV) started an aggressive anti-Pakistan campaign on social media calling for foreign sanctions on Pakistan. Republic TV in particular later aired footage of an alleged Pakistan Air Force airplane supporting Taliban troops in their fight against resistance forces in Panjshir. Some time later fact checkers including France 24 announced that it was a gameplay footage from a video game called ARMA 3.

=== Claims of a coup in China ===
On 25 September 2022, Republic TV used a sarcastic thread of German reporter Georg Fahrion to report on a "political coup" on Chinese President Xi Jinping in their news report as "First and Exclusive News" and Breaking News. The reports were taken down from Republic World's Youtube channel but got viral circulating on Twitter. When informed that his sarcastic thread was picked up and published as real news by Republic TV, Fahrion replied, "Since an Indian TV channel is now "reporting" on this thread, let me repeat: Two things are infinite, the universe and man's stupidity."

=== False report on Pentagon explosion ===
In May 2023, Republic TV aired a report about a supposed explosion near the Pentagon in the U.S., citing a tweet by Russian state media outlet RT. The tweet included an image generated by artificial intelligence, which was originally posted by an account aligned with the QAnon conspiracy theory, and subsequently amplified by a verified account posing as Bloomberg News. Republic TV subsequently issued a correction.

== Owned channels ==
Name	Language	Type
Republic TV	English	News channel & portal
Republic World	English	News channel & portal
Republic Bharat	Hindi	News channel & portal
Republic Bangla	Bangla	News channel & portal
Republic Kannada	Kannada	News channel & portal
Asianet News	Malayalam	News channel & portal
Asianet Suvarna News	Kannada	News channel & portal
Kannada Prabha	Kannada	Newspaper
Asianet Newsable	English	News portal
Asianet News Telugu	Telugu	News portal
Asianet News Tamil	Tamil	News portal
Asianet News Hindi	Hindi	News portal
Asianet News Bangla	Bangla	News portal

== Reception ==
=== Public ===
Republic TV allegedly became the most-watched English news channel in India in its first week of airing in May 2017 with 21.1 lakh (2.11 million) impressions and accounted for 51.9 per cent viewership as per data released for the week by the Broadcast Audience Research Council. The Financial Express noted Republic TV to be the most-watched English news channel in India for 100 weeks in a row since its founding. The top news channel spot was taken over by DD India, a public service broadcaster, in February 2019, according to the Indian newspaper Mint.

The News Broadcasters Association (NBA) subsequently lodged a complaint with the Telecom Regulatory Authority of India accusing the group of using unethical tactics for high viewership. It claimed that the channel ran multiple feeds over various multi-system operator (MSO) platforms and listed itself at multiple locations across various genres in the electronic program guide, in contravention of the telecom authority's rules. Telecom Regulatory Authority of India cautioned the channel against such practices and determined the viewership numbers to have been inflated.

These data have been since further challenged, after the channel found itself embroiled in a viewership-manipulation scam around late 2020.

=== Critical commentary ===
In a typical program, from 2017, Goswami mentioned a law mandating that movie theatres play the national anthem, and asked whether people should be required to stand; his guest Waris Pathan, a Muslim assemblyman, argued that it should be a matter of choice.

'Why can't you stand up?' — Goswami shouted at Pathan. Before Pathan could get out an answer, he yelled again — 'Why can't you stand up? What's your problem with it?'

Pathan kept trying, but Goswami, his hair flying, shouted over him:- 'I'll tell you why, because—I'll tell you why. I'll tell you. I'll tell you why. Can I tell you? Then why don't you stop, and I'll tell you why? Don't be an anti-national! Don't be an anti-national! Don't be an anti-national!'...

— Dexter Filkins, "Blood and Soil in Narendra Modi's India". The New Yorker. 2 December 2019.

The channel has been noted for its right-wing opinionated reporting in support of BJP and Hindutva across a wide spectrum of situations, including by presenting political opponents in a negative light and avoiding criticism of figures from ruling parties; it has been included among the group of pro-Modi government news media outlets dubbed the "Godi media". The channel has aided in developing and popularizing the neologisms of "Urban Naxal" and "tukde tukde gang" to denote anti-establishment voices critical to right wing sentiments, advocate government repression, and evoke hyper-nationalism among the audience. Using post-truth discourse, Republic TV has sparked communal tensions by broadcasting Islamophobic rhetoric, including the love jihad conspiracy theory.

The channel has been compared to North Korean media for its extreme pro-government affinity and muzzling of dissent. Noted political scientist Christophe Jaffrelot, journalist Dexter Filkins and others compare it to Fox News, an American cable news channel that practices biased reporting in favor of the Republican Party.

Vanita Kohli-Khandekar, on Business Standard, noted it to be a "noisy, chaotic place where coherent debate without shouting, screaming and name-calling is impossible"; others have noted of its shows to be a "battle of babble", judgmental, brash and hawkish. Vaishnavi Chandrashekhar, in a Foreign Policy article, noted its coverage of the 2019 India-Pakistan conflict, to put jingoism ahead of journalism. Historian Ramachandra Guha notes it to be a pro-government channel, which ignored issues of joblessness, agrarian distress et al. and instead took to demonizing Pakistan along with opposition parties, furthering religious bigotry in the process. Jaffrelot reiterated accusations of pliability after undertaking a detailed analysis of all debates held by the channel until April 2020 (and contrasting it with NDTV); he held the venture to have a negative consequence on India's democracy and raised concerns about the manner in which broader issues of socio-economic order were pushed away from the discourse-sphere. Fifty percent of the debates were solely focused on criticizing the opposition and Modi was extensively lauded all-around whilst not a single debate was construable as being explicitly in the opposition's favor. (Note: Debates were classified into Politics (Neutral), Anti-BJP, Anti-opposition, Pro-BJP, Pro-opposition, Economy, Crime and Justice, Health and Safety, and so on. There were some overlaps.)

Fact checkers have documented it to have propagated dubious news or fake news on multiple occasions.

== Prime time debates ==
A study done by Christophe Jaffrelot and Vihang Jumle published in The Caravan showed that nearly 50% of the 1,136 political debates televised by the network between May 2017 and April 2020 criticised the opposition and none strongly supported the opposition. The authors concluded the debates were biased in favour of the Modi government.

== See also ==
- List of news channels in India
- Media in India
