= CFBR =

CFBR may refer to:

- CFBR-FM: A Canadian FM station
- FBR-600: A proposed 600 MWe Indian fast breeder reactor
- Commenting for better reach
