= PS Communication =

Swedish advertising and communications agency

- Industry: Marketing Communications
- Founded: Stockholm, Sweden (1997)
- Headquarters: Stockholm, Sweden
- Revenue: SEK 240 million
- Number of employees: 150
- Website: www.ps-communication.se

PS Communication is a Swedish advertising and communications agency.

== Competency ==
The offering and consultancy comprises several communication disciplines, from brand and conceptual development to event marketing, advertising, design, web and PR.

PS Communication employs a full-time staff of 150 in Stockholm, Gothenburg, Malmö, Oslo, Copenhagen and Helsinki. Competences range from business consultants and designers to project managers, art directors and copywriters.

PS Communication has an international capacity via independent agency networks, Comvort and United Agencies Network. Partners are represented in over 60 countries world-wide.

PS Communication is an active member of Sponsrings & Eventföreningen, the Swedish Association of Event and Sponsorship Consultants (SEFS). PS Communication is also a member of the International Advertising Association and the Swedish Association of Communication Agencies.

PS Communication received the “Kundens Bästa Byrå” award (Clients choice of best agency) in Event Marketing and Action Marketing in 2011, an award presented by the branch press Résumé. PS Communication was also awarded "The Golden Wheel” by SEFS in 2009 and “Årets Byrå” (Agency of the year) in 2007, presented by Swedish business daily Dagens Industri.
