= Republic Bangla =

Indian bengali-language news channel

- Logo used since 2021
- Country: India
- Broadcast area: Worldwide
- Network: Broadcast television and online
- Headquarters: Kolkata, West Bengal, India

Programming
- Language: Bengali
- Picture format: 576i SDTV

Ownership
- Owner: Republic Media Network; Arnab Goswami; ARG Outlier Media
- Key people: Arnab Goswami
- Sister channels: Republic TV; Republic Bharat; Republic Kannada

History
- Launched: 7 March 2021; 5 years ago

Links
- Webcast: Live TV
- Website: bangla.republicworld.com

Republic Bangla is a free-to-air Indian Bengali-language news channel, launched on 7 March 2021, by Arnab Goswami's Republic Media Network. The channel was announced with the slogan "Kotha Hobey Chokhe Chokh Rekhe" (lit. 'We will talk eye to eye').

The channel is the third launched by Goswami, after the launches of Republic TV in English and Republic Bharat in Hindi. Goswami himself has spoken of his ambition to launch channels in all states and regional languages across India.

== Launch ==
Republic Bangla officially went on air at 8:00 AM on 7 March 2021.

== Hosts ==
The main hosts of this channel are Arnab Goswami, Mayukh Ranjan Ghosh, Swarnali Sarkar, Meenakshi Dev Biswas, Samadrita Mukherjee, Renaissance Chakraborty, Anirban Sinha and Bishakha Rudra.

== Controversies ==
The interim government of Bangladesh has alleged that since the fall of the Hasina government, Republic Bangla has been broadcasting news reports against Bangladesh. Later, on 18 November 2024, a lawyer of the Supreme Court of Bangladesh filed a writ petition in the High Court demanding a ban and block of their news and content within the territory of Bangladesh.
