= Republic Kannada =

Indian Kannada-language news channel

- Country: India
- Broadcast area: Worldwide
- Network: Broadcast television and Online
- Headquarters: Bengaluru,Karnataka, India

Programming
- Language: Kannada
- Picture format: SDTV

Ownership
- Owner: Republic Media Network; Arnab Goswami; ARG Outlier Media
- Key people: Arnab Goswami
- Sister channels: Republic TV; Republic Bharat; Republic Bangla

History
- Launched: 23 September 2023; 2 years ago
- Founder: Arnab Goswami
- Replaced: Dighvijaya News

Links
- Website: kannada.republicworld.com

Availability

Streaming media
- Republic Kannada live: Live TV
- YouTube: Republic Kannada

Republic Kannada (stylized as R. ಕನ್ನಡ) is a free-to-air Indian Kannada-language news channel, launched on 23rd September 2023 with the tagline 'ನಿಮ್ಮ ಧ್ವನಿ', Nimma Dhwani (trans. 'Your Voice'), by Republic Media Network. Republic Kannada was previously named Dighvijaya News and was owned by Vijay Sankeshwar's VRL Media. Republic Media Network officially bought the channel and rebranded it as Republic Kannada.

The channel has been able to make a mark as one of the most aggressive Kannada news channels to set the news agenda in Karnataka. The channel focuses on stories of impact that touch the common man.

Some of the renowned shows on the channel include Mahabharata, Karnataka Primetime, Yenu Nimma Problemu, Big Morning and Super 3.

Republic Kannada, through its Super 3 Impact segment, highlighted the plight of a Dalit family living in severe poverty without access to basic necessities, prompting immediate government action. Within 24 hours of the broadcast, a team of officials, including representatives from food, health, and administrative departments, visited the family to provide essential services. Interventions included issuing Aadhaar and ration cards, connecting the household to the electricity grid, repairing their roof, providing an LPG connection, distributing basic food items, conducting health check-ups, admitting a child to a government hostel, and issuing a Unique Disability ID (UDID) card. Additionally, the elder son was guaranteed employment to ensure financial stability. This swift response significantly improved the family’s living conditions, showcasing the impact of media in driving social change.

== Launch ==
Arnab Goswami announced the acquisition of the broadcast division of VRL Media Pvt. Ltd. and the upcoming launch of Republic Kannada (R. Kannada) on September 1, 2023, in Bengaluru. Following this announcement, the channel was rebranded and officially launched as Republic Kannada on September 23, 2023.

The channel is the fourth launched by the Republic Media Network, after the launches of Republic TV in English, Republic Bharat in Hindi and Republic Bangla in Bangla. Goswami himself has spoken of his ambition to launch channels in all states and regional languages across India.

== Hosts ==
Some of the prominent anchors of the channel include Niranjan Narayanaswamy, Jayaprakash Shetty, Smita Ranganath, Divith, Nagendra Babu, Shripad, Shruti Kittur, Ranjith and Nikesh. Niranjan Narayanaswamy is the current Editorial Head of the channel.

== Kanasina Karnataka Summit ==
Republic Kannada's marquee event called Kanasina Karnataka is organised every year in Bengaluru. The event aims to bring who's who of Karnataka under one roof to ideate on what needs to be done to take the state to greater heights. Some of the most notable voices in the two editions held so far, in 2023 and 2024 include D. K. Shivakumar, HD Deve Gowda, H. D. Kumaraswamy, Satish Jarkiholi, Swami Nirbhayanad, Jai Mrutyunjaya Swamiji, Veerendra Heggade, Sri Sri Ravi Shankar and many more.

== Awards ==
Karnataka Media Academy conferred the Mysuru Digantha Datthi Prashasti, Republic Kannada's journalist B.K. Devayya. He was conferred this award for his reportage of a 50 year old physically disabled man's plea of not receiving his pension for 6 years. After the report was telecasted, the government swiftly acted and resolved the issue. This report was a part of the Super 3 show hosted by Jay Prakash Shetty.
