= Sitaram Yechury =

Indian politician (1952–2024)

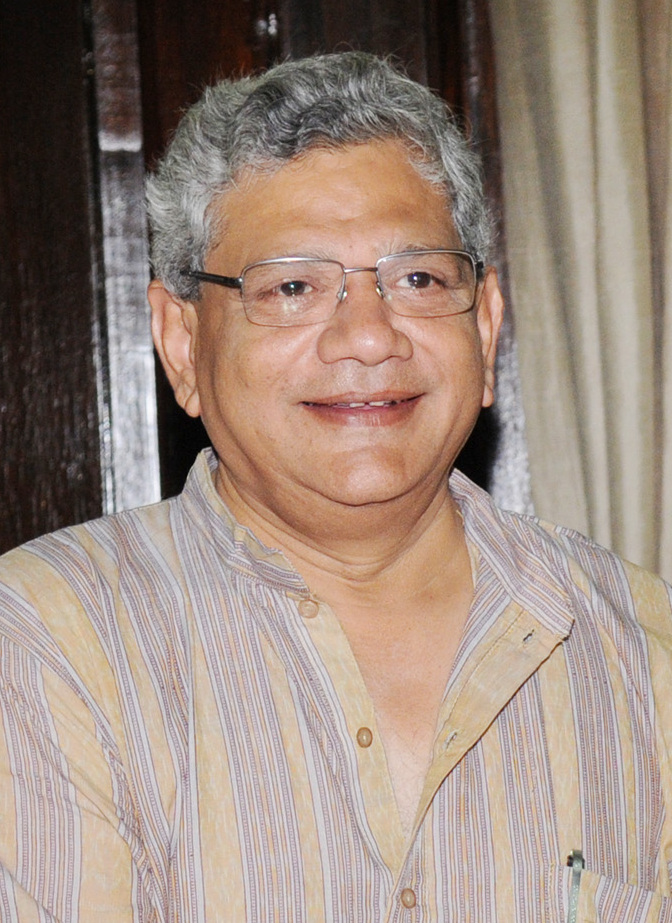
- Yechury in 2013

General Secretary of the Communist Party of India (Marxist)
- In office 19 April 2015 – 12 September 2024
- Preceded by: Prakash Karat
- Succeeded by: M. A. Baby

Member of the Politburo of the Communist Party of India (Marxist)
- In office 10 January 1992 – 12 September 2024

Member of Parliament, Rajya Sabha
- In office 19 August 2005 – 18 August 2017
- Preceded by: Abani Roy
- Succeeded by: Shanta Chhetri
- Constituency: West Bengal

Personal details
- Born: 12 August 1952 Madras, Madras State, India (present-day Chennai, Tamil Nadu, India)
- Died: 12 September 2024 (aged 72) New Delhi, India
- Party: Communist Party of India (Marxist)
- Spouse(s): Indrani Mazumdar; Seema Chishti
- Relations: Mohan Kanda (maternal uncle)
- Education: Jawaharlal Nehru University (MA); St. Stephen's College (BA)

Sitaram Yechury (12 August 1952 – 12 September 2024) was an Indian Marxist politician, theorist and statesman who was the General Secretary of the Communist Party of India (Marxist). He was also a member of the Politburo of the CPI(M) from 1992 until his death in September 2024. Previously, he was a Member of Parliament, Rajya Sabha, West Bengal, from 2005 to 2017.

He was married to Seema Chishti, founding editor of news publication The Wire.

== Early life ==
Yechury was born on 12 August 1952 into a Telugu Brahmin family in Madras. His father Sarveswara Somayajula Yechury and mother Kalpakam Yechury were natives of Kakinada, Andhra Pradesh. His father was an engineer in the Andhra Pradesh State Road Transport Corporation. His mother was a government officer and lived in Kakinada till her death in 2021.

Yechury grew up in Hyderabad, and studied at the All Saints High School, Hyderabad, till his tenth standard. The Telangana agitation of 1969 brought him to Delhi. He joined Presidents Estate School, New Delhi, and achieved the All-India first rank in the Central Board of Secondary Education Higher Secondary Examination. Subsequently, he studied B.A. (Hons.) in Economics at St. Stephen's College, Delhi, and M.A. in Economics, from Jawaharlal Nehru University (JNU), achieving first class in both. He joined the JNU for a Ph.D. in Economics, which was aborted with his arrest during The Emergency.

== Political career ==
Yechury joined the Students' Federation of India (SFI) in 1974. A year later, he joined the Communist Party of India (Marxist).

Yechury was arrested in 1975 during the Emergency while he was still a student at JNU. He went underground for some time, organising resistance to the Emergency, before his arrest. After the Emergency, he was elected as the President of the JNU Students' Union thrice during one year (1977–78). Yechury, along with Prakash Karat, created a leftist unit at JNU.

In 1978, Yechury was elected as All-India Joint Secretary of SFI, and went on to become the All India President of SFI. He was the first president of SFI who was not from Kerala or Bengal. In 1984, he was elected to the Central Committee of the CPI(M). In 1985, the party constitution was modified, and a five-man central secretariat—Yechury, Prakash Karat, Sunil Moitra, P. Ramachandran and S. Ramachandran Pillai—was elected to work under the direction and control of the politburo. He left the SFI in 1986. He was then elected to the Politburo at the Fourteenth Congress in 1992 and as the fifth General Secretary of CPI(M) at the party's 21st party Congress in Visakhapatnam on 19 April 2015. He and politburo member S. Ramachandran Pillai were the frontrunners for the post but the former was unanimously chosen after Pillai chose to withdraw. He succeeded Prakash Karat, who had held the post for three consecutive terms, from 2005 to 2015. He was again re-elected as General Secretary of CPI(M) at the 22nd Party Congress held at Hyderabad in April 2018. He was elected for a third term as General Secretary of CPI(M) at the 23rd Party Congress held at Kannur, Kerala in April 2022.

Yechury was considered to uphold the coalition-building legacy of former general secretary Harkishan Singh Surjeet. He worked with P. Chidambaram to draft the common minimum program for the United Front government in 1996 and had actively pursued the coalition-building process during the formation of the United Progressive Alliance government in 2004 and Indian National Developmental Inclusive Alliance in 2023.

Yechury headed the party's international department, and the party used to depute him as fraternal delegate to the party conferences of most socialist countries. A prolific writer, he authored many books and wrote the fortnightly column Left Hand Drive for Hindustan Times, a widely circulated daily. He edited party's fortnightly newspaper People's Democracy for 20 years.

=== Role in Rajya Sabha ===
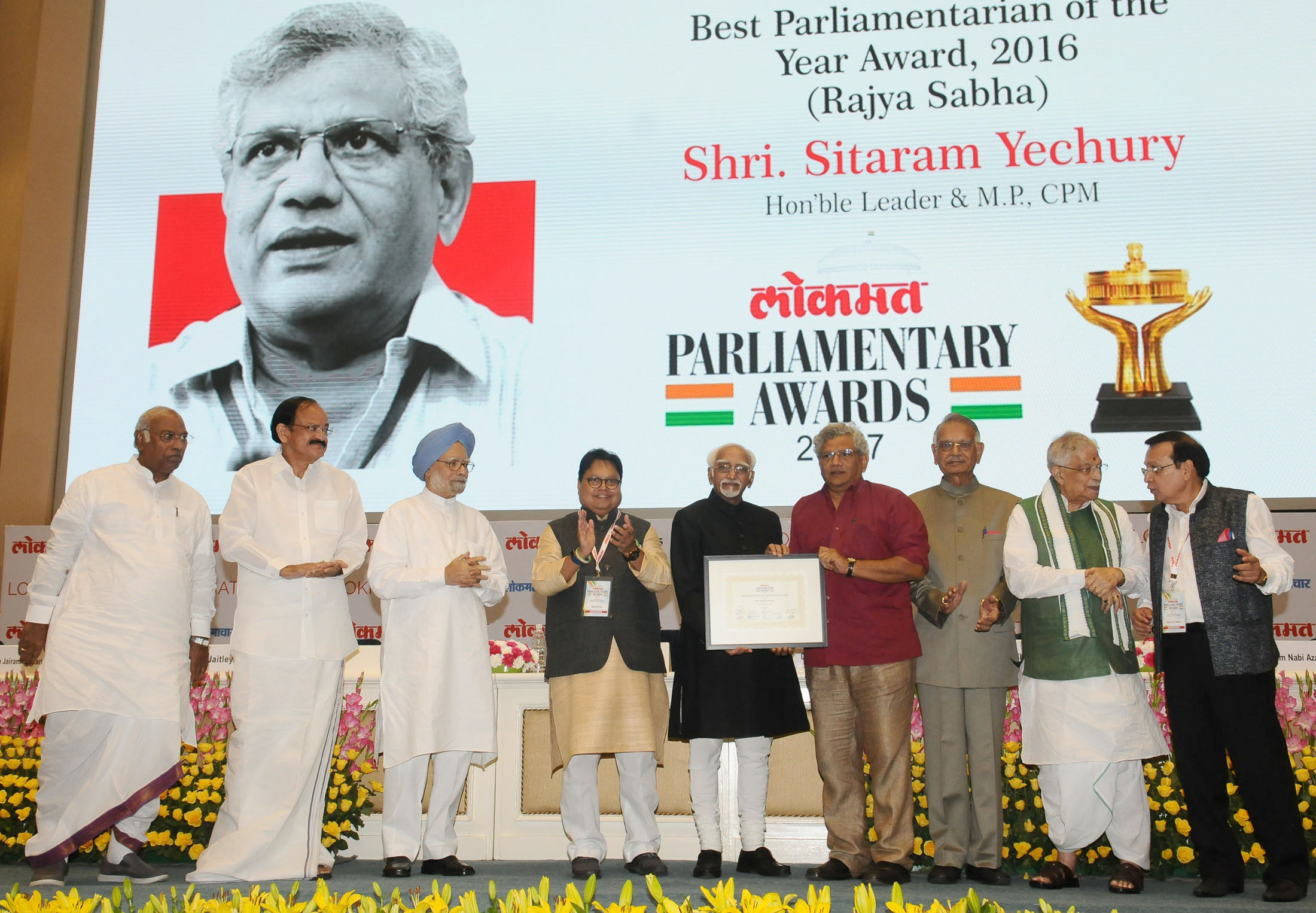
Yechury receiving Best Parliamentarian Award (Rajya Sabha) in 2017

Yechury was elected to Rajya Sabha from West Bengal in July 2005. He was known for bringing several popular issues to the notice of parliament and for raising questions on important issues. On blaming by the ruling party for frequent disruptions in parliament, he said that government cannot escape from its responsibility by blaming the opposition for frequent disruptions. He justified disruptions in parliament by calling it a legitimate process in a democracy.

During the negotiations for the Indo-US Nuclear Pact, Yechury listed in the Rajya Sabha all the conditions that the CPM required of the agreement. After the Manmohan Singh government satisfied all the conditions, he was overruled by Prakash Karat, who claimed that the agreement still violated the CPM's idea of independent foreign policy. It was said that this left Yechury "displeased and helpless".

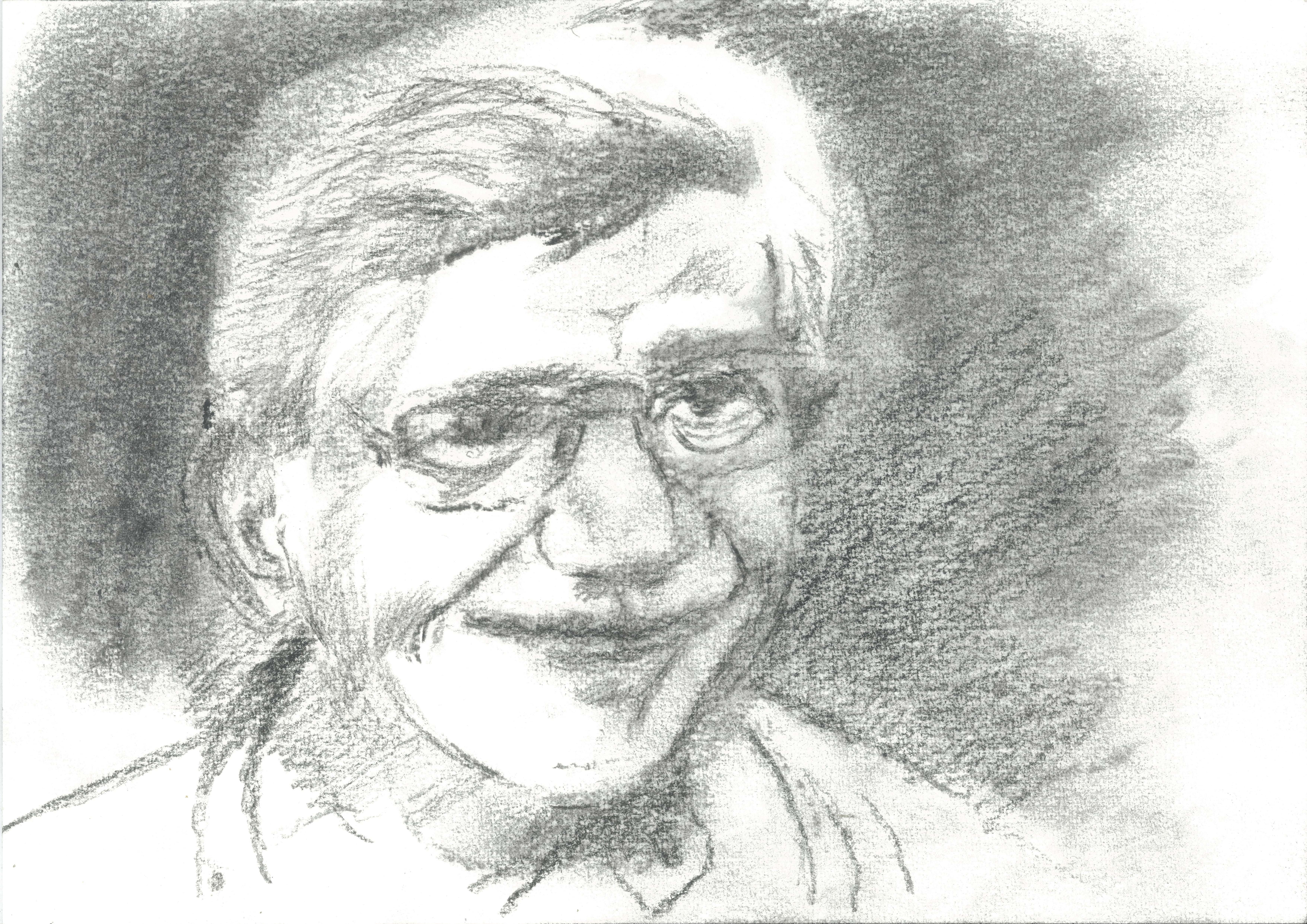
Comrade Sitaram Yechury, Charcoal on Paper by ˞Amitabh Mitra

On 3 March 2015 during parliament session, Yechury moved an amendment to President Pranab Mukherjee's address on the inaugural day of Parliament's budget session. This was passed by division of votes in Rajya Sabha, and it was an embarrassment to the Modi government. Parliamentary affairs minister Venkaiah Naidu stated that Yechury's concern had been noted and requested him to not go ahead with the amendment as this was not a convention. Yechury said normally he would accept such a request, but he was pressing for the amendment as the government left no choice as even after 14 hours of debate, opposition was denied opportunity to seek clarification on the Prime Minister's reply. This was the fourth time in Rajya Sabha's history that an amendment moved by the opposition to the motion of thanks to the President's address had been passed.

=== Views on United States ===
Yechury was a staunch critic of US foreign policy. He also criticised the visit of the US president Barack Obama as the chief guest of the 2015 Republic Day parade. He blamed the US for the rise of Islamic fundamentalism, stating:

US military interventions in West Asia have created a situation of complete uncertainty. The military interventions have always given birth to the rise of fundamentalism, which we see today in the menace that has been created by the ISIS. They have given birth to such tendencies.

He also criticised the US for its hegemonic attitude; he said

Now, in their (US) quest for global hegemony, they are trying to capture the energy resources in the world. They are trying to control the entire process of the energy transfers or trade in the world. And for this reason, their military interventions has also continuing to deny the Palestinians their legitimate right to a homeland.

He was also a staunch critic of abrogation of article 370 and 35A in Jammu and Kashmir.

On 12 September 2020, he along with Yogendra Yadav and others was named in the supplementary chargesheet by Delhi Police for their alleged role in the 2020 Delhi riots over which Yechury responded that Bharatiya Janata Party was misusing its power to target the opposition.

Yechury also supported the 1989 Tiananmen Square massacre, claiming the students were "CIA stooges and bourgeois delinquents." He also gave a speech in JNU in support of the Chinese government.

== Personal life ==
Yechury's first marriage was with Indrani Mazumdar, the daughter of famous feminist Vina Mazumdar. They had two children, a daughter named Akhila and a son named Ashish. After divorce he married a journalist Seema Chishti, who is the editor of The Wire, and formerly the Delhi editor of BBC Hindi Service. She was the Resident Editor of The Indian Express, Delhi. Yechury said in a ScoopWhoop episode that his wife financially sustained him. His daughter, Akhila Yechury, is a major in history and teaches at the University of Edinburgh and University of St. Andrews. His son Ashish Yechury died on 22 April 2021 due to COVID-19, at the age of 34. Mohan Kanda IAS, former Chief Secretary of Andhra Pradesh, is Yechury's maternal uncle.

== Death ==
Yechury was admitted to the department of emergency medicine at AIIMS Delhi on 19 August 2024 and was put on respiratory support after his condition turned critical in September, according to a statement by the CPI(M). He displayed symptoms of a pneumonia-like chest infection and died on 12 September, at the age of 72, after suffering from an acute respiratory infection. His body was donated to AIIMS for teaching and research purposes by his family.

== Works ==
Yechury authored the following books:

- What Is This Hindu Rashtra?: On Golwalkar's Fascistic Ideology and the Saffron Brigade's Practice (Frontline Publications, Hyderabad, 1993)
- Pseudo Hinduism Exposed: Saffron Brigade's Myths and Reality (Communist Party of India (Marxist), New Delhi, 1993)
- Caste and Class in Indian Politics Today (Prajasakti Book House, Hyderabad, 1997)
- Oil Pool Deficit Or Cesspool of Deceit (Communist Party of India (Marxist), New Delhi, 1997)
- Socialism in a Changing World (Prajasakti Book House, Hyderabad, 2008)
- Left Hand Drive: Concrete Analysis of Concrete Conditions (Prajasakti Book House, Hyderabad, 2012)
- Modi Government: New Surge of Communalism (Prajasakti Book House, Hyderabad, 2014)
- Communalism vs. Secularism
- Ghrina Ki Rajniti (Vani Prakashan, New Delhi, 2006) (in Hindi)

Yechury edited the following books:

- People's Diary of Freedom Struggle (Communist Party of India (Marxist), New Delhi, 2008)
- The Great Revolt: A Left Appraisal (Communist Party of India (Marxist), New Delhi)
- Global Economic Crisis: A Marxist Perspective
