= Target rating point =

TV viewership measurement metric

A target rating point (abbreviated as TRP; also television rating point for televisions) is a metric used in marketing and advertising to compare target audience impressions of a campaign or advertisement through a communication medium relative to the target audience population size. In the particular case of television, a device is attached to the TV set in a few thousand viewers' houses to measure impressions. These numbers are treated as a sample from the overall TV owners in different geographical and demographic sectors. Using a device, a special code is telecasted during the programme, which records the time and the programme that a viewer watches on a particular day. The average is taken for a 30-day period, which gives the viewership status for the particular channel. This has an average limit between 0-3.0.

== Target rating points construction ==
Target rating points quantify the gross rated points achieved by an advertisement or campaign among targeted individuals within a larger population.

For example, if an advertisement appears more than once, the entire gross audience, the TRP figure is the sum of each individual GRP, multiplied by the estimated target audience in the gross audiences. The TRP and GRP metrics are both critical components for determining the potential marketing reach of a particular advertisement. Outside of television, TRPs are calculated using the denominator as the total target audience, and the numerator as the total impressions delivered to this audience x 100. (As in 1,000,000 impressions among the target audience / 10,000,000 people in total in the target audience x 100 = 10 TRPs). TRPs are often added up by week, and presented in a flowchart so a marketer can see the amount of impressions delivered to the target audience from each media channel.

TRPs can also be calculated as 100 x reach x frequency, where reach is the percent of the target audience with at least one impression and frequency is the average number of impressions.

== TRP in India ==
=== Calculating TRP ===
In India, two electronic methods are there for calculating TRP:

- People meters device is installed in some places or set in selected homes to calculate the TRP. In this way, some thousand viewers are surveyed in the form of justice and sampling. These gadgets record data about the channel or programme watched by the family members or selected people. Through this meter the information of TV channel or programme for one minute is carried out by the INTAM a monitoring team, i.e., Indian Television Audience measurement. After analysing the information, the team decides what is the TRP of the channel or programme. Or we can say that this data is later analysed by the agency to create a national TRP data of various TV channels and TV programmes.
- Second method is known as picture matching, where the people meter records a small portion of the picture that is being watched on the TV. This data is collected from a set of homes in the form of pictures and later on is analysed to calculate the TRPs.

=== TRP Manipulation scams ===
In October 2020, a complaint was filed with the Mumbai Police accusing some channels of fraudulently inflating their viewership ratings. On 8 October 2020, following an announcement by Mumbai Police related to busting a scam to manipulate TRP ratings and in turn advertising revenue, an investigation has been launched into Republic TV's viewership ratings. Fakt Marathi, and Box Cinema TV were also charged in the FIR.

The police conducted an audit into the accounts of the ARG Outlier Media Pvt Ltd accounts. It showed that the TRPs (TV rating points) and viewership of its Hindi channel Republic Bharat, were high from the first month of its launch in 2016. The police alleged that the channel inflated its ratings by bribing low-income individuals, including people who did not comprehend English, to keep their televisions turned on and tuned to Republic TV. With an inflated TRP ARG Outlier Media (the company which owns Republic TV and Republic Bharat) was able to bargain for higher revenue from advertisers. Arnab Goswami denied the allegations and accused the Mumbai Police of retaliating against the channel's recent criticism of their activities.

On 21 October, the investigation became a country-wide case, potentially covering every news channel in India with the involvement of the Central Bureau of Investigation. The case now potentially covers every news channel in India. TV Today Network Ltd (Aaj Tak and India Today) was fined 5 lakh by BARC for viewership manipulation. Bombay High Court directed TV Today Network to Pay 5 lakh fine, or face coercive steps by BARC Disciplinary Council (BDC).

On 5 November 2020, Hansa Group has moved the Bombay High Court against Crime Branch and seeking transfer of the probe into the TRP scam to CBI, citing that Mumbai Police Crime Branch have been adopting pressure tactics to coerce its employees to issue a statement that a document flashed as Hansa Report by Republic TV is a fake document. Plea states that the petitioners are continuously held at the Crime Branch for long hours and threatened with arrest and are repeatedly pressed to make a false statement. Police officers were listed as respondents in the petition. Supreme court of India denied rejected the plea from the channel to protect its employees from arrest. On 13 December Republic TV CEO was arrested in Mumbai.

==== Leaked WhatsApp Conversation ====
The WhatsApp conversations between Republic TV executive editor Arnab Goswami and former CEO of Broadcast Audience Research Council (BARC) Partho Dasgupta, which were leaked into the public forum, has brought to the fore evidence of alleged collusion to influence TV ratings. The purported WhatsApp conversations between the two, which are a component of the charge-sheet submitted by the police in the court, reveal conspicuously discernible misuse of official position by Partho Dasgupta to avail his "friend" Arnab Goswami.

The TRP scam came to light in October 2020 when BARC filed a complaint through Hansa Research Group, alleging that certain television channels, including Republic TV, were rigging their TRP numbers.

In the purported conversations, the ex-CEO of BARC is visually perceived not just guiding Arnab on how to consolidate the position of Republic TV and Republic Bharat, but withal seeking favours in reciprocation in the form of "media advisor kind of position with the PMO".

These WhatsApp conversations have gone viral on gregarious media with people expressing shock and dismay at the alleged connivance between Partho Dasgupta and Arnab Goswami to manipulate the system. Additionally, the alleged claims made by Arnab Goswami over his reach and influence with the regime and his conspicuously discernible misuse of this to further his business fascinates have evoked vigorous reactions on social media and in the political spectrum. Allegations of Goswami having prior knowledge of the Balakot airstrike and using this knowledge for viewership gain have also caused controversy, prompting Maharashtra authorities to launch an investigation.

== See also ==
- Frequency (marketing)
- Gross rating point
- Reach (advertising)
- Republic TV TRP manipulation scam
