= Sony Entertainment Television =

Indian Hindi-language pay television channel

- Logo used since 2022
- Country: India

Programming
- Language: Hindi
- Picture format: 1080i HDTV

Ownership
- Owner: Sony Pictures
- Sister channels: See List of channels owned by Sony Pictures Networks

History
- Launched: 8 October 1995; 31 years ago

Links
- Website: setindia.com

Availability

Terrestrial
- DVB-T2 (India): Check local frequencies
- Asianet Digital (SD + HD): Asianet Digital

Streaming media
- SonyLIV: Watch now
- YouTube: SET India
- Sling TV: Internet Protocol television

Sony Entertainment Television (SET) is an Indian Hindi-language general entertainment pay television channel that was launched in 1995 and is owned by Sony Pictures Networks, a division of Sony Pictures.

== History ==
This channel was launched on 8 October 1995 which started airing many dramatic and reality shows. It also started airing all Disney Channel shows and Disney movies until 2003. It also aired CID and Crime Patrol. In 2006, Sony made an adaptation of the reality show Big Brother, Bigg Boss. It also made an adaptation of American show Fear Factor, Fear Factor India, but all these shows were moved to Colors TV.

The channel also started international broadcasting, under the name Sony Entertainment Television Asia (SET Asia). The 'Asia' name was dropped effective from December 2016.

In 2001, it changed its logo to a green colour. In November 2016, it changed its logo to a purple colour. In 2022, it changed its logo to match that of SonyLIV.

== Associated channels ==
=== Sony SAB ===
Sony SAB is an Indian Hindi-language general entertainment pay television channel owned by Sony Pictures Networks.

=== Sony Pal ===
Sony Pal (stylised as Sony पल) (Hindi for Moment) is an Indian pay television channel that was launched on 1 September 2014. It was initially aimed at women with women-oriented Hindi-language programming, now focused on family-oriented programming. The channel is owned by Sony Pictures Networks. The channel is available on Dish Network and Sling TV in USA.

=== Sony Kal ===
Sony Kal is an Indian-based international television service owned by Sony Pictures Networks. It was launched on 28 January 2022, and distributes Indian soap operas and other television programs in the United States and Canada. It is available on platforms such as Xumo, Sling TV, and TCL.
