= Independent and Public Spirited Media Foundation =

Indian public charitable trust

Independent and Public-Spirited Media Foundation
- Abbreviation: IPSMF
- Formation: July 1, 2015; 10 years ago
- Founder: Azim Premji; Rohini Nilekani
- Type: Public charitable trust
- Registration no.: CIT(E)/BLR/12A/M-134/AABT12413E/ITO(E)-1/ Vol 2015-2016
- Purpose: Promoting excellence in "independent, public-spirited journalism"
- Location: India
- Endowment: Financial and other support for public-interest information
- Website: ipsmf.org

The Independent and Public-Spirited Media Foundation is an Indian public charitable trust, established on July 1, 2015. The foundation works to promote independent journalism.

The foundation was started with a fund of Rs 100 crore by a group of Bengaluru businessmen, including Azim Premji, the chairman of Wipro, and philanthropist Rohini Nilekani.

In August 2016 the foundation awarded a grant of Rs 1.95 crore to the Foundation for Independent Journalism (FIJ), a non-profit company that publishes The Wire. The group was awarded a second tranch of Rs 1.75 crore in March 2017. In 2018, IPSMF granted FIJ Rs 3.26 crore and committed to funding them for 2018–2019 as well.

The IPSMF has given funding to the Pravda Media Foundation to enable them to report and publish stories that are of public importance. Pravda Media Foundation is owner of alt news.

IPSM has also provided financial support to Spunklane Media Private Limited for the purpose of reporting and publishing stories of public interest under the section 'Delve'. Spunklane Media Private Limited is owner of The news minute.

== Donors ==
The IPSMF Foundation has received contributions and substantial commitments from various individuals and charitable organizations, including Azim Premji Philanthropic Initiatives Pvt Ltd, Pirojsha Godrej Foundation, Cyrus Guzder, Rohini Nilekani Philanthropies, Kiran Mazumdar Shaw, Rohinton and Anu Aga Family Discretionary No.2 Trust, RDA Holdings Pvt Ltd, Lal Family Foundation, Sri Nataraja Trust, Manipal Education and Medical Group India Pvt Ltd, Tejaskiran Pharmachem India Pvt Ltd, Viditi Investment Pvt Ltd, Unimed Technologies Ltd, Quality Investment Pvt Ltd, and Piramal Enterprises LTD. The Foundation's core principles are built on two fundamental beliefs: that donors will not influence how their contributions are utilized, and that the Foundation's operations, led by a CEO and supported by a dedicated team, will remain independent of donor preferences, safeguarding its impartiality in funding decisions.
