= The Shand Group =

The Shand Group (TSG)
- Type: Private
- Industry: Advertising; Marketing
- Founded: 1982
- Headquarters: Los Angeles
- Area served: Austin; Los Angeles; New York; San Francisco; Santa Barbara, California; Seattle
- Key people: Bobby Shand (president); Chris Weakley (managing director); Angelique Rothermel (executive vice president)
- Services: Communication strategy and advertising
- Website: www.theshandgroup.com

The Shand Group (also known as TSG) is an independent, integrated advertising and marketing agency located in Santa Barbara, California, and operating satellite offices in Los Angeles, New York, San Francisco, Seattle and Austin. The agency was founded in Los Angeles in 1982 by president Bobby Shand, and operates with ten to thirty employees and contract associates. Marketing services include: market positioning and strategy, brand identity, advertising and collateral, web development, media planning and placement. TSG's client base includes products and services aimed at the upscale consumer and trade markets.

== History ==
Moving the senior management office to Santa Barbara in 1995 allowed the principals, Bobby and Susan Shand, to utilize technology to establish a then revolutionary virtual office setup that allowed top creative and account personnel to conduct their job functions from across the county. Satellite offices were established in New York, Los Angeles, San Francisco, and Seattle, with creative talent pulled from all corners of the country.
