= Chitra Subramaniam =

Indian journalist

- Born: 5 April 1958 (age 68); Sindri, Bihar, India
- Education: Delhi University, Stanford University
- Occupations: Journalist, author, entrepreneur
- Spouse: Giancarlo Duella
- Children: 2
- Website: http://www.csdconsulting.net

Chitra Subramaniam Duella (born 5 April 1958) is an Indian journalist. She is recognised in India for her investigation of the Bofors-India Howitzer deal which is widely believed to have contributed to the electoral defeat of former prime Minister Rajiv Gandhi in 1989. She founded CSDconsulting, a Geneva based specialised consultancy working in the area of public health, trade policy, development directions and media. She is also the co-founder and Managing Editor of The News Minute – an online news website. She was an Editorial Adviser for Republic TV of Arnab Goswami . In 1989, she was honoured with the Chameli Devi Jain Award for Outstanding Women Mediaperson.

== Personal life and education ==
Chitra was born in 1958, in Sindri, India. She earned bachelor's degree in English Literature at Lady Shri Ram College, Delhi, Post-Graduate Diploma in Journalism at Indian Institute of Mass Communication and Masters in Journalism at Stanford University. She is married to Dr. Giancarlo Duella, a mathematician and lives in Geneva, Switzerland. The couple has a daughter Nitya Duella and son Nikhil Duella. Chitra is listed in the Who's Who of south Asian women.

== Career ==
Chitra joined India Today, an Indian news magazine as a reporter in 1979 and continued to write for it and other Indian publications when she moved to Switzerland in 1983. She was based in Geneva as a United Nations (UN) correspondent when the Swedish State Radio reported in April 1987 that bribes had been paid to Indians and others for the sale of field howitzers to India by the Swedish arms manufacturer, Bofors.

Chitra Subramaniam continued to report on the investigations and court proceedings in Switzerland till the Swiss government handed over secret Swiss bank documents with additional details of the payments to the government of India in 1997. In 2017 she joined Republic news channel launched by Arnab Goswami. As a UN correspondent, she has reported on various issues including disarmament, the Bosnian war and peace negotiations, the Uruguay Round of multilateral trade negotiations that led to the creation of the World Trade Organization (WTO) and human rights.

For her work she has received several journalism awards including the prestigious B.D. Goenka Award and the Chameli Devi Award. She is the author of several books, including; India is for Sale, a New York Times – India best seller, the cover for which was designed by one of India's best known cartoonists Mr. R. K. Laxman. In April 2012, Columbia University's School of Journalism cited a joint article by N. Ram, who headed The Hindu's investigation, and Subramanian among 50 Great Stories since 1915.

In 1997, Chitra Subramaniam was invited by Dr. Gro Harlem Brundtland, the former Prime Minister of Norway to be part of her campaign team for the post of Director General of the World Health Organization (WHO). Dr. Brundtland was elected as head of the WHO and she announced that global tobacco control was one of her priorities setting up a special project called which oversaw multilateral negotiations between 198 countries to conclude the Framework Convention on Tobacco Control (FCTC), the world's first treaty entirely devoted to public health. Chitra Subramaniam led the work initially on media and later in policy analysis and communications. "She reframed the debate on tobacco away from being one focused on individual frailties to one that needed to address tobacco corporate abuses and in so doing built a reinvigorated tobacco control movement. Many of her approaches used in tobacco control continue to be adapted to address other threats to health," said Dr. Derek Yacht, Senior Vice-President Pepsi (Health), USA, who worked with Subramaniam at the WHO.

After the successful completion of the FCTC mandate at the WHO, Chitra Subramaniam moved on to set up CSDconsulting which has mandates from several companies many of whom are global leaders.

In April 2012, 25 years after L'affaire Bofors came to light, Sten Lindstrom, former head of Swedish police said he was the "deep throat" who explained the modus operandi of the illegal payments when he handed over the documents to Chitra Subramaniam. In a wide-ranging interview to her published in The Hoot www.thehoot.org he spoke about probity in public life, the role of whistle-blowers in a democracy, freedom of information and the role of the media, etc. The interview became a global story.

In March 2023 Chitra left The News Minute and announced she will start her own media house.
