= Seema Chishti =

Indian journalist and writer

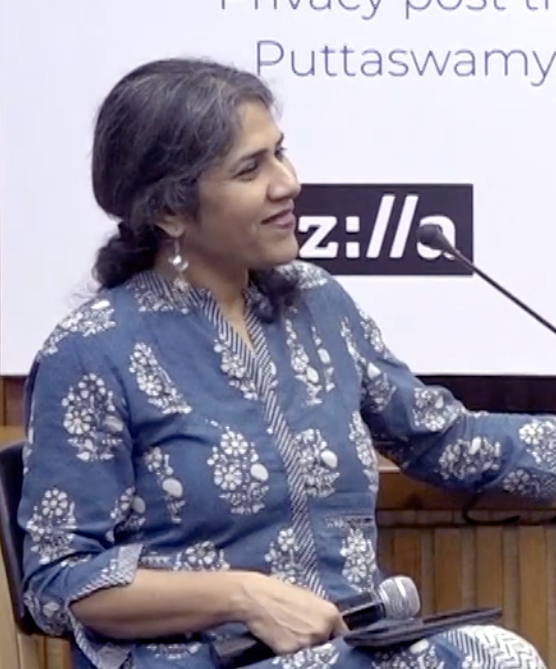
- Chishti at "Privacy Supreme" 2019
- Citizenship: Indian
- Education: Jawaharlal Nehru University (MA) St. Stephen's College (BA)
- Occupations: Journalist, Editor, Author
- Years active: 1990–present
- Employer: The Wire
- Spouse: Sitaram Yechury (d. 2024)
- Website: www.seemachishti.com

Seema Chishti is a journalist and writer from Delhi, India. She is currently one of the editors of the digital news portal The Wire. She was editor for the Hindi and Delhi Bureau head for the BBC and a deputy editor at the Indian daily The New Indian Express. She has also published the book Sumitra and Anees: Tales and Recipes From a Khichdi Family and co-authored Note By Note: The India Story (1947–2017).

Chishti was married to Sitaram Yechury, politician and previous general secretary of CPIM.

== Early life and education ==
Seema is daughter of Anees Chishti and Sumitra Chisthi.

Chishti has a bachelor's from St. Stephen's College, Delhi and a master's degree in economics from Jawaharlal Nehru University.

She worked at HTV and the BBC World Service in London from 1994 to 1996, before she moved to BBC India. She worked at The Indian Express from 2006, where she served as resident editor at Delhi and also deputy editor before discontinuing on 2020.

Chishti was married to Sitaram Yechury, politician and previous general secretary of CPIM, and member of parliament, before his death in 2024.

== Books ==
- Sumitra and Anees: Tales and Recipes From a Khichdi Family
- Note By Note: The India Story (1947–2017)
