= Asianet News =

Indian Malayalam-language television news channel

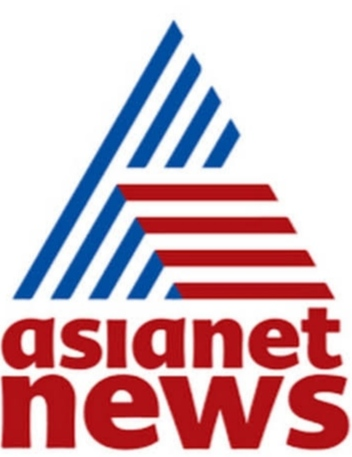
- Logo used since 2003
- Country: India
- Broadcast area: Indian sub-continent
- Network: Asianet News Network
- Headquarters: Thiruvananthapuram, Kerala, India

Programming
- Language: Malayalam
- Picture format: 576i SDTV

Ownership
- Owner: Jupiter Capital
- Parent: Asianxt Digital
- Sister channels: Asianet Suvarna News

History
- Launched: 30 September 1995; 30 years ago
- Founder: Raji Menon
- Former names: Asianet Global

Links
- Website: www.asianetnews.com

Availability

Streaming media
- YouTube: (Worldwide)

Asianet News is an Indian Malayalam-language free-to-air news channel, operated by the Asianet News Network, a subsidiary of Jupiter Capital Ventures. The channel is based in Thiruvananthapuram, Kerala.

Malayalam general entertainment channels, Asianet, Asianet Plus, and Asianet Movies, owned by JioStar (a joint venture between Viacom18 and Disney India) presently have no connection with the Asianet News Network channels.

== History ==
Asianet, Asianet Satellite Communications and Asianet News were founded by Raji Menon. Initially, Raji Menon owned a 93% stake. A 5% stake was with Raghu Nandan (Menon’s elder brother). Sashi Kumar was a paid employee of Asianet and Raji Menon's nephew, whom Menon gifted a 2% stake first, increased to 26% and then to a 45% stake later at Sashi Kumar's request. Raji Menon bought back the shares, earlier gifted to Sashi Kumar in 1999 at an agreed price, and took over full control of Asianet.

Asianet Communications was the first entertainment television company in Malayalam.

== Origins ==
Asianet Communications was toying with the idea of a news channel - there was none in Malayalam - for a long time. It was with this intention that Asianet Global - their second channel - was launched in June 2001. The channel was targeting the huge expatriate Malayali population in the Middle East and Europe. However, as it turned out, there were very few news-based programmes on the channel and most of them later gave way to film-based entertainment programmes.

With Asianet Global not fetching returns, the management decided to go in for an entertainment channel called "Asianet Plus" and terminate Asianet Global. Midway through the launching and wind-up process, there was a rethink and the concept of a news channel was revived. It was initially reported in the media that a news channel would be launched by December 2002. The channel was expected to have news programmes in the evenings after which there would be a variety of entertainment programmes. Hourly news bulletins were also expected. Asianet Global was eventually renamed as "Asianet News" on 1 May 2003. The company's MD, K. Madhavan, told the media that the entire channel had also been restructured in the process.

== The Era of Rajeev Chandrasekhar ==
Rajeev Chandrasekhar was a Bangalore-based businessman of Kerala origin. In late 2006 Raji Menon partially pulled out of Asianet turning over control to Chandrasekhar. At the time, Asianet was the leader amongst the Malayalam channels accounting for 35% of Kerala's total advertisement market.

Chandrasekhar had acquired a 51% stake in the Asianet channels (Asianet, Asianet News, and Asianet Plus) through Jupiter Entertainment Ventures (JEV) in October 2006. While there was no official word from Asianet on the size of the investment, the figure is thought to range between INR 120-150 crore. The remaining 49% stake was still held by Menon and Asianet MD K. Madhavan with the Zee Group holding a small 3% stake. Madhavan continued as the MD of Asianet, while Chandrasekhar took over as the chairman of the company. Asianet Communications soon launched its foray into the Kannada and Telugu television industry with Asianet Suvarna and Asianet Sitara.

== Star India acquisitions ==
Asianet was restructured into four companies in June 2008 (general entertainment, news, radio and media infrastructure). This move was to allow separate investments in each company. Star India started talks with the owners of the Asianet channels in August 2008.While the negotiations were going on, the CPI(M) leadership in Kerala famously called for "a revolt against the entry of media mogul Rupert Murdoch's Star TV network into the [Kerala] state". The party called the move a "cultural invasion".

Star India eventually bought a 51% stake in Asianet Communications and formed a joint venture with JEV in November 2008. The joint venture, called "Star Jupiter", comprised all general entertainment channels of Asianet Communications (Asianet, Asianet Plus, Asianet Suvarna and Asianet Sitara) and Star Vijay. Star India had reportedly paid $235 million in cash for the 51% stake and assumed a net debt of approximately $20 million. It's not clear how much stake Raji Menon held in the new Star Jupiter venture. Before forming the JV, it was known that the founder (Menon) had held about 26% stake. In the wake of media reports about the Star takeover, Asianet Vice-chairman Madhavan issued a media release saying: "There is no basis for the speculation that the policies of the Asianet News Network (ANN) will fall under foreign Star control".

Star India increased its stake in Asianet Communications to 75% in July 2010 (for which STAR India paid around $90 million in cash), and to 87%, by acquiring a 12% stake for $160 million in June 2013. The latter move was by acquiring a 19% equity stake in Vijay TV from Chandrasekhar and Asianet Communications MD Madhavan. Following the June 2013 investment, Asianet Communications was valued at $1.33 billion. Star India acquired a 100% stake in Asianet Communications (buying the remaining 13% stake) in March 2014.

== Allegations on curtailing of editorial freedom ==
In October 2016, Jupiter Capital was accused by the media of interfering with editorial freedom. The accusation was triggered by a leaked email sent from Jupiter Capital Chief Operating Officer Amit Gupta to the editorial heads of Asianet News, Suvarna News, and Kannada Prabha. M. G. Radhakrishnan, the former Editor-in-Chief of Asianet News, told the media he was not aware of the email and that he had "never faced pressure of any kind from the management".

Chandrasekhar was one of the largest investors in ARG Outlier Asianet News, the parent company of the English-language news channel Republic TV. Chandrasekhar, through Asianet, had invested over ₹30 crore in ARG Outlier. SARG Media Holding - owned by Arnab Goswami - is other major investor in ARG Outlier Asianet News. In May 2019, Asianet diluted its shareholding in the Republic Media Network by selling a large amount its shares to Goswami. Currently, Asianet News is a minority investor in Republic TV.

== Security issues and ban ==
On 6 March 2020, the Information and Broadcasting Ministry suspended the broadcast of Asianet News and MediaOne TV for two days over their coverage of the 2020 Delhi riots. The ministry accused the two channels of "being biased and critical of the Rashtriya Swayamsevak Sangh and the Delhi Police". Citing a report of P. R. Sunil, the government said the coverage was done in a manner "which highlighted the attack on places of worship and siding towards a particular community". The ban on Asianet News was eventually revoked at 1:30 am (8 March).

== Editorial freedom ==
"Asianet News had a long history of credible and balanced journalism that is critical of positions across the political spectrum, despite being owned by a parliamentarian of the Hindu nationalist party...Nikita Saxena and Atul Dev reported on how the editorial team of Asianet [News] have frequently resisted attempts by [Rajeev] Chandrashekar to interfere with their broadcasts and dictate their coverage and the struggle to maintain the channel's objectivity."

— The Caravan (2020)

Asianet News and Suvarna News are currently run by the Asianet News Network (ANN). The ANN operates as a subsidiary of Jupiter Entertainment Ventures (JEV), a subsidiary of Jupiter Capital Ventures. As per the media critics, Asianet News enjoys a good "reputation" among the news channels in Malayalam. It is often described as "a widely trusted" brand and "top player" in the Malayalam media space.

According to Jacob George, a prominent commentator, Asianet News has had a "secular and progressive stance" since the time of its inception in 2003. In his opinion, the current editorial leadership at the news channel is "not easily malleable" and has "immense credibility". According to the Caravan magazine, Asianet News, is "by wide consensus, the most popular and credible news channel in Kerala".

=== Recruiting guideline Email ===
Media watchdog Newslaundry exposed an e-mail from Amit Gupta, the Chief Operating Officer of Jupiter Capital, to the editorial heads of Asianet News and Suvarna News, in October 2016. The internal e-mail was sent in September 2016 as a 'guideline' to look up while recruiting new editors.

Jupiter Capital, according to the email, wanted their new editors to be "right of centre in his/her editorial tonality" and "well familiarised with his (Rajeev Chandrasekhar's) thoughts on nationalism and governance"..

Amit Gupta, on the very next day, had to retract the email because of internal editorial pushback.
