= Mohan Kanda =

Indian civil servant (born 1945)

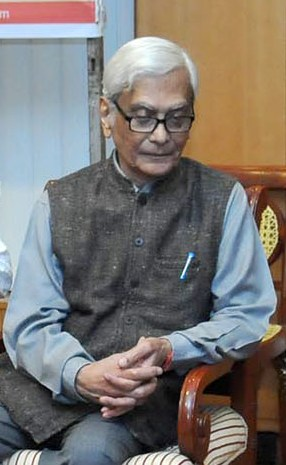
- Born: 4 September 1945 (age 81); Madras, Madras Presidency, British India (now Chennai, Tamil Nadu, India)
- Occupation: Civil Servant
- Relatives: Sitaram Yechury (Nephew)

Mohan Kanda (born 4 September 1945) is an Indian civil servant. He is an Indian Administrative Service officer of the 1968 batch. He retired as Chief Secretary of Andhra Pradesh in 2003. He also served as a Member of National Disaster Management Authority.

== Early life ==
He was born in Chennai, Tamil Nadu, in a Telugu Brahmin family to the High Court judge Mr. Bhimsankaram Kanda and Mrs. Papayamma, a prominent social reformer. He was the youngest child of his parents, who had ten children in total. He did his schooling from All Saints High School, Hyderabad and his Bachelors and Masters in Mathematics from Nizam College, Osmania University. He was awarded Ph.D in Mathematics by Osmania University for his thesis. His nephew was the former Communist Party of India (Marxist) General Secretary, Sitaram Yechury, who died on 12 September 2024.

He has acted in a few Telugu films as a child actor with the screen name "Master Mohan." They include Pelli Chesi Choodu a comedy film of 1952 directed by L. V. Prasad. He acted in the song drama Amma Noppule Ammamma Noppule.

== Career ==
Mohan Kanda started his career with State Bank of India as an Probationary Officer. After becoming an IAS Officer he began working with the Government of Andhra Pradesh. He was also Secretary, Ministry of Agriculture, Government of India and served as Member, National Disaster Management Authority (NDMA). He worked as a Secretary in the Union Ministry of Agriculture before working as Chief Secretary in Chandrababu Naidu's government and later with Y.S.Rajasekhara Reddy government.

He is a Member of the Steering Committee on Agriculture and Allied Sectors for the formulation of the 12th Five Year Plan (2012–17) for Planning Commission.

He was made head of a committee that would look into the problems faced by the Coastal Andhra riots in declaring a Crop Holiday.

== Personal life ==
Mohan Kanda is married to Usha.
