= The Wire (India) =

Indian nonprofit news website

- Website type: Journalism, news, analysis
- Headquarters: First floor, 13 Shaheed Bhagat Singh Marg, Gole Market, Delhi 110001, India
- Owner: Foundation for Independent Journalism (FIJ)
- Editors: Siddharth Varadarajan; Sidharth Bhatia; M. K. Venu; Seema Chishti
- Website: thewire.in
- Commercial: No
- Launched: 11 May 2015; 11 years ago

The Wire is an Indian nonprofit news and opinion website. It was founded in 2015 by Siddharth Varadarajan, Sidharth Bhatia, and M. K. Venu. One section of the media and society considers it among the news outlets that are independent of the Indian government, while the other section calls it heavily biased against the Bharatiya Janata Party. The website has been subjected to several defamation suits by state governments, businessmen, politicians and multinational companies.

== History ==
The Wire was founded by Siddharth Varadarajan, after he left his job as editor at The Hindu. It began operating on 11 May 2015; Varadarajan worked with Sidharth Bhatia and M. K. Venu who had initially funded the website. Later it was made part of the Foundation for Independent Journalism, a non-profit. The Independent and Public Spirited Media Foundation has provided The Wire with funding as well.

Varadarajan claims that the publication was created as a "platform for independent journalism", and that its non-corporate structure and funding sources aim to free it from the "commercial and political pressures" which supposedly afflict mainstream Indian news outlets. The Wire's founding is construed to be a result of and a reaction to a political environment which has "discouraged dissent" against the present Indian ruling Bharatiya Janata Party.

According to one of the founding editors, the founders' basic value is to stand for the right of the individual against the normally overbearing nature of the State. He further added that the founders are socially and economically liberal in their approach. Varadarajan said in an interview that he (and by extension The Wire, as asked in question) in all matters of journalism is guided by the Constitution of India.

In 2020, The Wire joined Progressive International's Wire— a coalition of progressive media outlets from around the world.

== Content ==
According to a 2017 article of the Mint, the websites coverage primarily focused on the topics of development, foreign policy, political economy, politics and science. Karan Thapar's regular show The Interview with Karan Thapar covers current affairs and events on The Wire.

== Reception ==
Dheeraj Mishra, Seemi Pasha Win Ramnath Goenka Awards for 2019 Reports for 'The Wire'. Three journalists working for The Wire, have won the Ramnath Goenka Excellence in Journalism Awards. Neha Dixit, reporting on extrajudicial killings and illegal detentions, won the CPJ International Press Freedom Award in 2017, Chameli Devi Jain Award for Outstanding Women Mediapersons in 2016, and the Lorenzo Natali Journalism Prize. A story published in the Columbia Journalism Review in late 2016 identified The Wire as one of several independent and recently founded internet-based media platforms-a group that also included Newslaundry, Scroll.in, The News Minute, The Quint and ScoopWhoop-that were attempting to challenge the dominance of India's traditional print and television news companies and their online offshoots.

Siddharth Vardarajan was awarded with the Shorenstein Prize in 2017; jury member of the award Nayan Chanda mentioned Vardarajan's independent web-based journalism-venture and distinguished body of well-researched reports to be an epitome of journalistic excellence and innovation. In November 2019, The Network of Women in Media, India criticised The Wire for providing a platform to Vinod Dua for making fun of an allegation of sexual harassment against him. A December 2019 article by Dexter Filkins of The New Yorker, noted that The Wire is one of the few small outfits and the most prominent (other than The Caravan), to have engaged in providing aggressive coverage of the current Indian Govt ruled by BJP at a time when mainstream media is failing to do so.

In September 2021, The Wire received the 2021 Free Media Pioneer Award given by the International Press Institute for being 'an unflinching defender of independent, high-quality journalism'.

An Investigative Report Published on The Wire Wins Laadli Media Awards 2025.

=== Meta/XCheck controversy ===
On 10 October 2022, The Wire alleged Meta (formerly Facebook) provided Amit Malviya, the head of the Information Technology Cell of the incumbent ruling party in India, with the ability to delete any post on Instagram bypassing the usual content moderation system. The article says Amit Malviya had these privileges since his account had the XCheck tag. Meta categorically denied and called the Wire's reporting "false" and said it was based on "fabricated evidence". Later the publication went on to publish a purported "internal message" from Andy Stone, the Communications Director, expressing frustration at the leak of Malviya's privileges. A further detailed report was also published which featured email-communication from two anonymous "experts" verifying the integrity of Stone's email and a semi-redacted video of an in-house moderation tool attesting to Malviya's privileges.

Soon, numerous flaws were spotted in the evidence that pointed to fabrication and skeptics, including former Facebook whistle-blowers, began to cast doubts. Afterwards, as both the anonymous experts denied involvement with The Wire, the reports were subject to an internal review and retracted by The Wire; later the publication conceded its failure to verify the evidence and accused the reporter, Devesh Kumar, of deceit. The developments also brought back focus on the publication's earlier investigative coverage of an app called Tek Fog—supposedly used by the ruling party to spread disinformation and harass dissenters, that Kumar had been responsible for. This story also was removed from the site, and The Wire issued a formal apology, admitting to have rushed the story without having it double checked independently.

Bloomberg and Editors Guild of India also later retracted their coverage of Tek Fog, which was solely based on The Wire's reporting. The Guild in its statement, urged newsrooms 'to resist the temptation of moving fast on sensitive stories, circumventing due journalistic norms.' The Guild also called the lapses by The Wire 'condemnable' in a subsequent statement.

=== Temporary website access restrictions ===
The Wire reported on 9 May 2025 that their website was blocked across India by internet service providers following orders from the Ministry of Electronics and Information Technology under the 2000 IT Act, citing violation of press freedom. The Wire said they would challenge this restriction. Founding editor Siddharth Varadarajan stated that the website was blocked by ISP's in India due to publication of a story which claimed Pakistan had shot down an Indian Rafale during an air skirmish on the night of May 7 to 8, based on an earlier CNN report. This restriction came a day after the Indian government requested X (formerly Twitter) to restrict the access of 8,000 accounts following the military conflict between India and Pakistan. The website was unblocked after they removed the Rafale story, as per claimed by The Wire.

== Litigations ==
Former Bharatiya Janata Party (BJP) Rajya Sabha MP and venture capitalist Rajeev Chandrasekhar filed a defamation suit in a Bangalore civil court after two articles alleged a conflict of interest between his legislative role and his investments in the media and defence sectors. The case was later dismissed, with the court ruling in favour of The Wire.

In 2017, Jay Shah, son of then Home Minister Amit Shah, filed a criminal defamation case against The Wire over an article alleging irregularities in his business dealings. During the COVID-19 pandemic, The Wire faced action from the Uttar Pradesh government led by Yogi Adityanath. In September 2021, the Supreme Court of India granted interim protection from arrest but declined to quash the FIRs. In February 2022, Bharat Biotech filed a ₹100-crore defamation suit against The Wire over its coverage of Covaxin.

== See also ==
- Nonprofit journalism
- Tek Fog (Hoax)
