= Amit Malviya =

Indian politician ( BJP)

Amit Malviya is an Indian politician who formerly served as the national convener of the BJP IT cell between 2015 and 2026. He currently serves as the party co-in-charge of Maharashtra. Numerous posts by Malviya have been found to have been spreading disinformation. In December 2020, Twitter flagged a tweet by Malviya about the farmers' protest as 'manipulated media'.

== Biography ==
Hailing from Prayagraj, Uttar Pradesh. He completed his BBM from Dayalbagh Educational Institute and PGDM Finance Management from Symbiosis Institute of Management Studies Symbiosis International University. He went on to work in the banking sector for a number of years.

In 2009, Malviya gained prominence in the BJP through the forum 'Friends of BJP'. Following this he was made the head of the BJP IT Cell in the year 2015. He was removed from the post on 17 August 2026, replaced by Deepak Mhaske.

== Controversies ==
=== Allegations of Sexual Misconduct ===
In June 2024, Congress leader Supriya Shrinate demanded the removal of Amit Malviya as head of the Bharatiya Janata Party's (BJP) IT Cell, following allegations made by Santanu Sinha, a member of the Hindu Samhati organization. Sinha accused Malviya of involvement in sexual exploitation of women, allegedly taking place in hotels and BJP offices in West Bengal. Malviya denied the claims and filed a legal notice against Sinha, demanding an apology and retraction. Subsequently, Sinha issued a public apology, stating that his comments were misinterpreted and that he did not intend to accuse Malviya of misconduct.

=== FIR Over Alleged Misinformation Campaign ===
In May 2025, the Indian Youth Congress filed a First Information Report (FIR) against Malviya and Arnab Goswami, editor-in-chief of Republic TV, alleging that they disseminated false information claiming the Istanbul Congress Center in Turkey was an international office of the Indian National Congress. The complaint described the post as part of a "criminally motivated campaign" to mislead the public and defame Rahul Gandhi. The Karnataka High Court later stayed the proceedings against both individuals, pending further review.
