= Asianet Suvarna News =

Indian Kannada-language television news channel

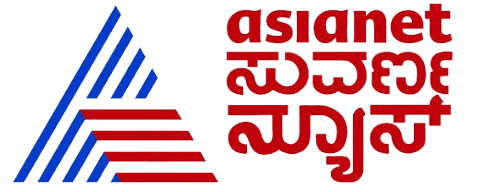
- Logo used since 2020
- Country: India
- Broadcast area: Indian subcontinent
- Network: Asianet News Network
- Headquarters: Bengaluru, Karnataka

Programming
- Language: Kannada
- Picture format: 576i SDTV

Ownership
- Owner: Jupiter Capital
- Parent: Asianxt Digital
- Sister channels: Asianet News

History
- Launched: 31 March 2008; 18 years ago

Links
- Website: www.kannada.asianetnews.com

Availability

Streaming media
- YouTube: (World wide)

Asianet Suvarna News is a Kannada news channel owned by Asianet News Network, a news media subsidiary of Asianxt Digital Technologies. The majority shareholder of the company is Rajeev Chandrasekhar, who is a Rajya Sabha member from the Bharatiya Janata Party. It launched on 31 March 2008, the channel was the third news channel to be aired in the Kannada language. The channel has telecast fabricated news and social media hoaxes on various occasions. Unlike its sister channel Asianet News, the channel's editorial stance has faced allegations of aligning with the political ideology of its majority owner, Rajeev Chandrasekhar.

== History ==
Asianet suvarna news (formerly Suvarna News) was launched as a 24x7 Kannada news channel on 31 March 2008 by Asianet Communications Limited, the media enterprise of Jupiter Capital Private Limited. With the launch, Asianet Suvarna News became the third News channel in Kannada.

Suvarna News had existed as a news bulletin on Suvarna TV before the launch of its own channel in 2008. In November 2008, Star India acquired Asianet Communications excluding its news media operations. As a result, Suvarna News was placed under the Asianet News Network which continued to be owned by Jupiter Capital. Suvarna News was rebranded as Asianet Suvarna News on 1 December 2020.

== Controversies ==
The channel has a history of frequent changes in its editorial leadership. According to Shashidhar Bhat, the first and former editor of the channel, Rajeev Chandrasekhar maintains editorial control through the corporate management of the company.

According to some reports, personnel from Suvarna News had also provided technical assistance for setting up NaMo TV, BJP party channel, first before the assembly elections of Gujarat in Oct 2012 and later before and after the 2019 Indian general election.

The National Broadcasting Standards Authority (NBSA) finned Suvarna News Rs 50,000 for their biased coverage of the Tablighi Jamaat congregation of March 2020.

The Human rights organization, People's Union for Civil Liberties (PUCL) reported that Suvarna News along with other media channels, aided right wing Hindutva activists with coverage, during the attacks by right-wingers against the Karnataka's Christian community in 2021.

== See also ==
- List of Kannada-language television channels
- Television in India
- Media in Karnataka
- Media of India
