= International gateway =

An International Gateway is a telephone number through which calls are routed to get cheaper rates on international long distance charges, or to make calls through voice over IP (VOIP) networks internationally. They also are effective in making an international call into the US appear as if it is originating from a local number rather than the real location.

Although there are numerous legitimate uses, they are also frequently used by scammers and con artists of all sorts, ranging from international fraudsters to lottery fraud as well as fake money order overpayment fraud. On some occasions the caller ID will display the call as INTL GATEWAY; at other times, anonymous or unknown. Frequently when calling the number back it will appear as if it is a disconnected number. Unknown phone numbers may be researched through many sites on the Internet.
