= Social media reach =

Social media reach is a media analytics metric that refers to the number of users who have come across a particular content on a particular social media platform. Social media platforms have their own individual ways of tracking, analyzing and reporting the traffic on each of the individual platforms. As these platforms are a main source of communication between companies and their target audiences, by conducting research, companies are able to utilize analytical information, such as the reach of their posts, to better understand the interactions between the users and their content.

There are multiple underlying factors that will determine what shows up on a newsfeed or timeline. Algorithms, for example, are a type of factor that can alter the reach of a post due to the way the algorithm is coded, which can affect who sees a post and when. Other examples of factors that can impede the reach can include the time at which posts are made, as well as how frequent the posts are between one another.

In comparison, an impression is the total number of circumstances where content has been shown on a social timeline, meanwhile, engagement looks at how people interact with the content that they see on a social platform such as like, share or retweet.

== Reach on Facebook ==
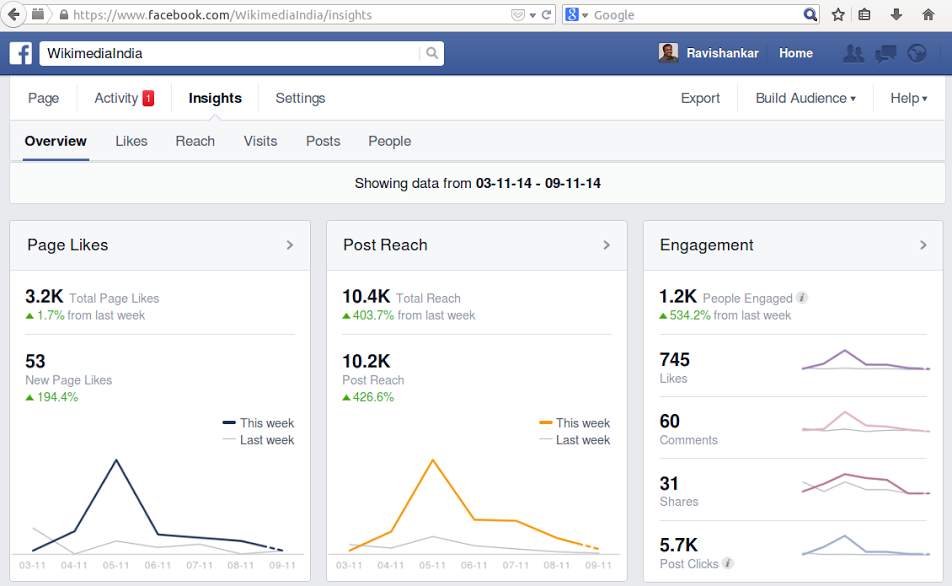
Example of an analytic dashboard on Facebook that looks at the reach of a post.

Facebook has their own analytic platform which allows the user to see how other users are interacting with their posts, with the use of multiple metrics. This is not something the average user uses, but rather a tool that is used by pages or public figures. For example, Facebook pages that represent a business often look at the activity their posts have generated. There are three types of reach that can be looked at on the Facebook analytic platform.

=== Types of reach ===
==== Organic Reach ====
This type of reach regards the number of distinct users that have seen a specific post on their feed. Organic reach, in other words is the number of people who have seen the post being analyzed on their Facebook newsfeed. Data gathered from this type of reach can give intel to those doing the analysis, such as the demographics of those who have seen the post.

==== Paid Reach ====
This type of reach regards the number of times that distinct users have come across sponsored posts, ads or content. In other words, paid reach is the number of times Facebook users have seen a post that has been paid for by a company. Data collected can give insight, to advertisers or marketers for example, on the activity based around the reach of their post.

==== Viral Reach ====
This type of reach regards the number of views by distinct users on posts that have been commented on or shared by their friends on Facebook. In other words, viral reach looks at the number of people who have seen a post after a friend of theirs commented or shared the original post, therefore it showed on their timeline. Viral reach can be looked at in terms of a collective number of times that the post has been on individual user's timelines. Data collected from viral reach can be used in multiple ways, for example, it can be used to analyze the type of content that gets shared or commented on and can be further used to compare to other posts.

=== Engaged users ===
This refers to the number of individual users who have clicked and interacted with a post on Facebook.

== Reach on Twitter ==
Twitter gives access to any of their users to analytics of their tweets as well as their followers. Their dashboard is user friendly, which allows anyone to take a look at the analytics behind their Twitter account. This open access is useful for both the average user and companies as it can provide a quick glance or general outlook of who has seen their tweets. The way that Twitter works is slightly different than the way of Facebook in terms of the reach. On Twitter, especially for users with a higher profile, they are not only engaging with the people who follow them, but also with the followers of their own followers. The reach metric on Twitter looks at the quantity of Twitter users who have been engaged, but also the number of users that follow them as well. This metric is useful to see the if the tweets/content being shared on Twitter are contributing to the growth of audience on this platform.

== Reach on Instagram ==
Instagram gives their users access to their reach, in the Instagram Insights section. Instagram insights can be used to learn more about an account's followers and performance. Reach indicates the total number of unique Instagram accounts that have seen your Instagram post or story. You can find this data by looking at each individual post insights.

== Uses of reach ==
The reach can be a useful metric to analyze for marketers and advertisers. Social media is a platform that is used by marketers to directly target their intended audience with ease. These platforms not only allow marketers to get a better understanding of their audience, but also allow advertisers to insert their ads onto the timelines of specific users to later be able to conduct research to see the reach of their posts/content.

The basic goal of marketers is to increase their reach as much as possible to impact bigger audiences of their dream customers and, in the end, make more sales. When doing organic social media marketing, using paid methods like ads or doing influencer marketing whether it is paid or free, it allows marketers to track the performance of their strategy and tweak it based on what works and what does not.

== Analytics and reach ==
Social analytics looks at the data collected based on the interactions of users on social media platforms. A lot of information can be gathered which can provide intel based on user activities on social media. When looking into analytics in regard to social media, each company or group has a different goal in mind to engage their audience. At a glance, the three might seem as if they are very similar, however the differences between them are significant. There are many aspects that can be analyzed from the data gathered from social media platforms, depending on what is being observed, the correct metric would then be selected to further analyze.

One example of the many metrics that can be used through social analytics is the reach.

== Reach formula ==
To calculate social media reach one can use the following formula:

$$R = \frac{I}{\bar{f}}$$

where $R$ — is social media reach, $I$ stands for the number of impressions, $\bar{f}$ is the average frequency of impressions per user. $\bar{f}$ represents the number of events when the ad is shown to a particular user. The average value should be calculated over the time period with stable settings of advertisement campaign.

== Commenting For Better Reach ==
Commenting For Better Reach also known as "CFBR" is a widely used strategy for organically boosting post reach on social media platforms. Algorithms tend to favor posts with substantial likes and comments, granting them broader exposure compared to less engaging content.

Primarily seen on LinkedIn, a platform geared toward professional networking and business connections, the use of CFBR signals active engagement aimed at enhancing post visibility. Genuine and meaningful comments are key to effective engagement. Spammy or irrelevant comments not only detract from the conversation but may also limit a post's potential reach and impact.

== See also ==
- Reach (advertising)
- Metric (disambiguation)
- Data Analytics
