= Gross rating point =

Marketing measurement metric

In advertising, a gross rating point (GRP) measures the size of an audience that an advertisement impacts. GRPs help answer how often "must someone see it before they can readily recall it" and "how many times" does it take before the desired outcome occurs.

== Overview ==
Gross rating points are a measure of the impact by a campaign using a specific medium or schedule. It quantifies impressions as a percentage of the target population, multiplied by frequency. This percentage may be greater, or in fact much greater, than 100.

Target rating points express the same concept, but with regard to a more narrowly defined target audience.

GRPs are used predominantly as a measure of media with high potential exposures or impressions. Nielsen Media Research is an example of a company which uses GRPs.

== Purpose ==
With "today's fragmented media world" the value of GRP is, according to the Advertising Research Foundation's Journal of Advertising Research, even greater than in the pre-Internet era. Since "the required frequency changes with the product and the competitive climate it is in", the purpose of the GRP metric is to measure impressions compared to the number of people in the target for an advertising campaign. GRP values are commonly used by media buyers to compare the advertising strength of components of a media plan.

For conventional media such as radio and TV, multi-tasking has reduced the value per GRP, and a measure named Persuasion Rating Point (PRP) was proposed in mid 2020.

== Construction ==
"One GRP is one percent of all potential adult television viewers (or in radio, listeners) in a market." If they are exposed to the ad three times, then that is 3 GRPs.

GRPs are simply total impressions related to the size of the target population: They are most directly calculated by summing the ratings of individual ads in a campaign.

Mathematically:

GRPs (%) = 100 * Total Impressions (#) ÷ Defined population (#)
GRPs (%) = 100 * Reach (%) × Average frequency (#)

Three examples:

- If 100,000 ad impressions are displayed on multiple episodes or TV stations for a defined population of 100,000 people, the total is 100 GRPs. However, total reach is not always 100%.
- If an average of 12% of the people view each episode of a television program, and an ad is placed on 5 episodes, then the campaign has 12 × 5 = 60 GRPs.
- If 50% view three episodes, that's 150 GRPs.

== See also ==
- Target rating point
