= Frequency (marketing) =

Number of times an audience is exposed to advertisement

In marketing and advertising, frequency refers to the number of times a target audience is exposed to a particular message or advertisement within a given time frame. This concept is a fundamental element of marketing communication strategies, aiming to enhance brand recall, create awareness, and influence consumer behavior through repeated exposure.

From an audience perspective, Philip H. Dougherty says frequency can be interpreted as "how often consumers must see it before they can readily recall it and how many times it must be seen before attitudes are altered."

For a business, increased frequency is generally desirable. Some studies have shown that audiences respond more favorably from repeated exposures to advertisements (i.e., increased frequency). Moreover, to maximize return on ad spend (ROAS), some research suggests the repeat of exposures should be spread out (once-a-week) versus multiple times in a short-time period (multiple times in a day), in order not to overwhelm the target audience.

== Construction ==
=== Television ===
In television media, frequency is calculated by dividing the number of impressions by the total audience population that was reached.

$F=I/U$

where

- $F$ is the frequency
- $I$ is the total number of impressions
- $U$ is the total number of unique users (or reach)

=== Radio ===
In radio, frequency is calculated multiplying gross impressions, the total number of times a commercial is heard, divided by the total audience population that was reached.

$F = \frac{GI}{U} = \frac{AQH * S}{U}$

where

- $GI$ is the gross impressions
- $AQH$ is the Average Quarter-Hour persons, the "average number of persons listening to a particular station for at least five minutes during a 15-minute period"
- $S$ is the total number of spots or commercials
- $U$ is the total number of unique users (or reach)

== Frequency capping ==
Frequency capping is a term in advertising that means restricting (capping) the number of times a specific visitor to a website is shown a particular advertisement (frequency). This restriction is applied to all websites that serve ads from the same advertising network.

Frequency capping is a feature within ad serving that allows to limit the maximum number of impressions/views a visitor can see a specific ad within a period of time. For example, "three views/visitor/24-hours" ("three views per visitor per 24-hours") means after viewing this ad three times, any visitor will not see it again for 24 hours. This feature uses cookies to remember the impression count. Non-cookies privacy-preserving implementation is also available.

Frequency capping is often cited as a way to avoid banner burnout, the point where visitors are being overexposed and response drops. This may be true for direct-response campaigns whose effectiveness is measured in click-throughs, but it might run counter to campaigns whose goal is brand awareness, as measured by non-click activity.

== Effective frequency ==
The effective frequency is the number of times a person must be exposed to an advertising message before a response is made and before exposure is considered wasteful.

The subject of effective frequency is quite controversial. Many people have their own definition on what this phrase means. There are also numerous studies with their own theories or models as to what the correct number is for effective frequency.

There are several definitions of effective frequency:

- Advertising Glossary defines effective frequency as "Exposures to an advertising message required to achieve effective communication. Generally expressed as a range below which the exposure is inadequate and above which the exposure is considered wastage."
- Business Dictionary defines it as "Advertising, the theory that a consumer has to be exposed to an ad at least three times within a purchasing cycle (time between two consecutive purchases) to buy that product."
- Marketing Power defines it as "An advertiser's determination of the optimum number of exposure opportunities required to effectively convey the advertising message to the desired audience or target market."
- John Philip Jones says, "Effective frequency can mean that a single advertising exposure is able to influence the purchase of a brand. However, as all experienced advertising people know, the phrase was really coined to communicate the idea that there must be enough concentration of media weight to cross a threshold. Repetition was considered necessary, and there had to be enough of it within the period before a consumer buys a product to influence his or her choice of brand."

== Theorists ==
=== Hermann Ebbinghaus ===
In 1879–80, Hermann Ebbinghaus conducted research on higher mental processes; he replicated the entire procedure in 1883–84. Ebbinghaus' methods achieved a remarkable set of results.

He was the first to describe the shape of the learning curve. He reported that the time required to memorize an average nonsense syllable increases sharply as the number of syllables increases.

He discovered that distributing learning trials over time is more effective in memorizing nonsense syllables than massing practice into a single session; and he noted that continuing to practice material after the learning criterion has been reached enhances retention.

Using one of his methods called savings as an index, he showed that the most commonly accepted law of association, viz., association by contiguity (the idea that items next to one another are associated) had to be modified to include remote associations (associations between items that are not next to one another in a list).

He was the first to describe primacy and recency effects (the fact that early and late items in a list are more likely to be recalled than middle items), and to report that even a small amount of initial practice, far below that required for retention, can lead to savings at relearning.

He even addressed the question of memorization of meaningful material and estimated that learning such material takes only about one tenth of the effort required to learn comparable nonsense material.

This learning curve research has been used to help researches study advertising message retention.

=== Thomas Smith ===
Thomas Smith wrote a guide called Successful Advertising in 1885. The saying he used is still being used today.

The first time people look at any given ad, they don't even see it.
The second time, they don't notice it.
The third time, they are aware that it is there.
The fourth time, they have a fleeting sense that they've seen it somewhere before.
The fifth time, they actually read the ad.
The sixth time they thumb their nose at it.
The seventh time, they start to get a little irritated with it.
The eighth time, they start to think, "Here's that confounded ad again."
The ninth time, they start to wonder if they're missing out on something.
The tenth time, they ask their friends and neighbors if they've tried it.
The eleventh time, they wonder how the company is paying for all these ads.
The twelfth time, they start to think that it must be a good product.
The thirteenth time, they start to feel the product has value.
The fourteenth time, they start to remember wanting a product exactly like this for a long time.
The fifteenth time, they start to yearn for it because they can't afford to buy it.
The sixteenth time, they accept the fact that they will buy it sometime in the future.
The seventeenth time, they make a note to buy the product.
The eighteenth time, they curse their poverty for not allowing them to buy this terrific product.
The nineteenth time, they count their money very carefully.
The twentieth time prospects see the ad, they buy what is offering.

=== Herbert E. Krugman ===
Herbert E. Krugman wrote "Why Three Exposures may be enough" while he was employed at General Electric. His theory has been adopted and widely in use in the advertising arena. The following statement encapsulates his theory: "Let me try to explain the special qualities of one, two and three exposures. I stop at three because as you shall see there is no such thing as a fourth exposure psychologically; rather fours, fives, etc., are repeats of the third exposure effect.

Exposure No. 1 is...a "What is it?" type of... response. Anything new or novel no matter how uninteresting on second exposure has to elicit some response the first time...if only to discard the object as of no further interest... The second exposure...response...is "What of it?"...whether or not [the message] has personal relevance...

By the third exposure the viewer knows he's been through his "What it is?" and "What of it's?," and the third, then, becomes the true reminder ... The importance of this view ... is that it positions advertising as powerful only when the viewer...is interested in the [product message]... Secondly, it positions the viewer as...reacting to the commercial – very quickly...when the proper time comes round.

There is a myth in the advertising world that viewers will forget your message if you don't repeat your advertising often enough. It is this myth that supports many large advertising expenditures... I would rather say the public comes closer to forgetting nothing they have seen on TV. They just "put it out of their minds" until and unless it has some use ... and [then] the response to the commercial continues.

According to Krugman, there are only three levels of exposure in psychological, not media, terms: curiosity, recognition and decision.

== See also ==
- Digital marketing
- Reach (advertising)
- Marketing mix modeling
- Gross rating point
- Target rating point
