= International Advertising Association =

International marketing industry association

The International Advertising Association (IAA) is a global association that represents marketers, ad agencies and mass media that carries advertisements. The association is headquartered in New York City and maintains chapters in 77 countries.

== History ==
The association was founded on April 9, 1938, at the Harvard Club of New York by Thomas Ashwell, publisher of Export Trade & Shipper magazine, and 12 other advertising industry managers. Initially known as the Export Advertising Association, the association's goal is to exchange information about successful practices in international advertising.

In 1954, the association adopted its current name.

IAA as an international industry association positions itself as a platform for advertising industry issues, and as an organization that protects and advances the freedom of commercial speech, responsible advertising, consumer choice, and the education of marketing professionals by researching and providing advertising regulation literature in many countries of the world. The International Advertising Association has conducted and summarized surveys over the years, on culturally sensitive topics such as the relative use and permissibility of "sex and decency" in advertisements.

== Role and priorities ==
The association encourages self-regulation to keep advertising "legal, decent, honest and truthful", and it advocates increasing consumer choice and freedom of commercial speech. It is also a forum where advertising and marketing industry professionals discuss issues and concerns in diverse environments. The IAA supports internship programs for youth exploring job opportunities in the industry, as well as pro bono advertisement campaigns on global themes such as its "Give a Kid a Hand" campaign in 1998.

=== Meetings, awards and standards ===
The IAA organizes the biennial World Advertising Congress, a worldwide meeting of advertising professionals. The association also holds regional conferences wherein key speakers from the regional markets are invited to participate. At these events, it also honors individuals in the advertisement industry and in the mass media who have made significant positive impact on the mission and priorities of the International Advertising Association. The IAA has developed accreditation standards for advertising diploma programs in 35 countries, and these standards were the basis for 1-year courses in some 50 institutes as of 2014.

=== Literature ===
The IAA publishes an annual report, a membership directory as well as periodic literature authored by scholars in academia that is aimed at keeping its stakeholders informed about changing laws, issues and perspectives on advertisement and marketing.

The IAA started publishing monographs on international advertising in the 1980s, in particular about regulations and self-regulation initiatives in each country. The association's literature on relative perception of similar advertisements in different cultures and regional regulations is one of the most comprehensive, states Gordon Miracle. For example, the Jean Boddewyn surveys and publications sponsored by the IAA on issues such as "sex and decency" in advertisements show a wide relative variation. The top regional concerns vary, according to these IAA studies, ranging from the ads being generally received as "tasteless", or "sexy", or "sexist", or "objectification of women", or "violence against women" depending on the surveyed country. The IAA monographs are in use by the advertising industry professionals and as teaching materials in the academic community.

== Structure ==
The IAA operates at three levels: central, regional and national/local (chapters), each of which operate with considerable autonomy. It has three important bodies that are crucial to the running of the organization: the board of directors, the executive committee and vice-presidents. The IAA official website has published a complete list of the IAA past presidents and chairmans since 1938.

The IAA, states Jones, had over 5,300 individual members and 97 corporate members in 95 countries by 1999. A majority of its membership is from the developed economies, the second largest group of members were from Asia and Pacific region, while the Middle East, Africa and Latin America accounted for the remaining.

== Campaigns and controversies ==
In 2009 the "Hopenhagen"-campaign was created by the IAA in support of the United Nations Climate Change Conference (COP15). In the interest of the entire industry it has through its chapters launched various pro bono campaigns illustrating the role of marketing communications to economies.

The close connections and collaboration of IAA – as well as other advertising industry organizations such as the European Association of Advertising Agencies – with the tobacco industry has been controversial.
