= Asianet Satellite Communications =

Indian cable operator

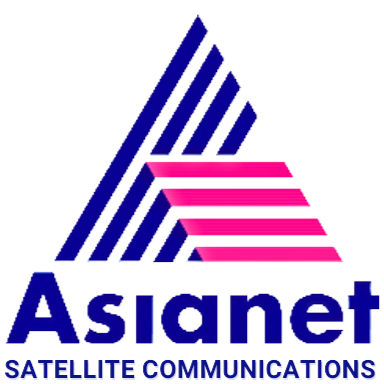
- Company type: Privately held company
- Industry: Telecommunications
- Founded: 1993; 33 years ago
- Founder: Raji Menon
- Headquarters: Kazhakoottam, Thiruvananthapuram, Kerala, India
- Area served: India
- Products: Cable television; Broadband; Internet service; Digital media
- Parent: Rajan Raheja Group
- Subsidiaries: Asianet Digital Network; Asianet Broadband; Asianet Mobile TV+; Asianet Cable Vision; Asianet Web
- Website: www.asianet.co.in

Asianet Satellite Communications Limited is an Indian multi system operator (MSO). It is the largest cable network services company in Kerala since its inception in 1993. It is ranked among the top 20 internet service providers (ISP) in India by TRAI. The company is currently headquartered in Thiruvananthapuram, Kerala.

== Operations ==
=== Broadband ===
Asianet Broadband, a division of Asianet Satellite Communications Pvt. Ltd. is an Internet service provider. It has set up its own international satellite gateways at Thiruvananthapuram and Kochi. It is also one of the earliest cable ISP services to have presence in Kerala.

=== Cable ===
Asianet Digital Network Pvt. Ltd., a wholly owned subsidiary of Asianet Satellite Communications Pvt. Ltd. is a digital television network in India. Asianet Digital TV is its digital cable TV service in India with a presence in the states of Kerala, Tamil Nadu, Karnataka, Andhra Pradesh and Telangana.

=== OTT service ===
Asianet Mobile TV + is the over-the-top media service segment of Asianet Satellite Communications. ASCL partnered with Xperio Labs to develop the service in 2015. Asianet is the first MSO in India to launch an OTT service.

=== TV channels ===
Asianet Cable Vision or ACV is a cable television network in South India.

Channel Name	Language	Category	Availability	Notes
ACV	Malayalam	General Entertainment	SD	
Asianet Teleshop	Malayalam, Tamil, Kannada, Telugu, Hindi	Teleshopping	SD	
Rosebowl	Malayalam, English	General Entertainment	SD + HD	
ACV Jukebox	Malayalam	General Entertainment	SD	
ADN Gold	Malayalam	General Entertainment	SD	
ACV Medley	Malayalam	General Entertainment	SD	
ACV Ustav	Malayalam	General Entertainment	SD	
COMX	Malayalam	Comedy	SD	
ACV News	Malayalam	News	SD	
ACV Movies	Malayalam	Movies	SD	
ACV Jyothi	Malayalam	Devotional	SD	
ACV Plus	Malayalam	General Entertainment	SD	
