= Reach (advertising) =

Marketing measurement metric

In advertising and media analysis, reach (or cumulative audience, cumulative reach, net audience, net reach, net unduplicated audience, or unduplicated audience) refers to the total number of different people or households exposed, at least once, to a medium during a given period. Reach should not be confused with the number of people who will actually be exposed to and consume the advertising, though. It is just the number of people who are exposed to the medium and therefore have an opportunity to see or hear the ad or commercial. Reach may be stated either as an absolute number, or as a fraction of a given population (for instance, "TV households", "men", or "those aged 25–35").

== Definition ==
For any given viewer, they have been "reached" by the work if they have viewed it at all (or a specified amount) during the specified period. Multiple viewings by a single member of the audience in the cited period do not increase reach; however, media people use the term effective reach to describe the quality of exposure. Effective reach and reach are two different measurements for a target audience who receive a given message or ad.

Since reach is a time-dependent summary of aggregate audience behavior, reach figures are meaningless without a period associated with them: an example of a valid reach figure would be to state that "[example website] had a one-day reach of 1565 per million on 21 March 2004" (though unique users, an equivalent measure, would be a more typical metric for a website).

Reach of television channels is often expressed in the form of "x minute weekly reach" – that is, the number (or percentage) of viewers who watched the channel for at least x minutes in a given week.

== Calculation ==
The following formula is used to calculate the reach of a marketing campaign,

$U=I/F$

where

- $U$ is the total number of unique users (i.e., reach)
- $I$ is the total number of impressions
- $F$ is the frequency

Reach can be expressed as a number of people in a population exposed to an advertisement, or as a percent of the population.

For example, in the UK, BARB defines the reach of a television channel as the percentage of the population in private households who view a channel for more than 3 minutes in a given day or week. Similarly, for radio, RAJAR defines the weekly reach of a radio station as the number of people who tune into a radio station for at least 5 minutes (within at least one 15-minute period) in a given week.

== Purpose ==
Reach is an important measure for the BBC, which is funded by a mandatory licence fee. It seeks to maximise its reach to ensure all licence fee payers are receiving value. In addition to reach, frequency of exposure is another important statistics used in advertising management. When reach is multiplied by average frequency, a composite measure called gross rating points (GRPs) is obtained. Reach can be calculated indirectly as: reach = GRPs / average frequency.

== See also ==
- Social media reach
- Television advertisement Vehicle Exposure of Media research
- Gross rating point
- Frequency (marketing)
