= BJP IT Cell =

Department of the Bharatiya Janata Party

Bharatiya Janata Party Information Technology Cell
Information Technology Cell overview
- Formed: 2007
- Type: Information Technology Cell
- Jurisdiction: India
- Status: Active
- Employees: 5,000–6,000 approximately
- National IT Cell Head responsible: Deepak Mhaskey, National Convener
- State IT Cell Head responsible: All States BJP Conveners
- Parent of the Information Technology Cell: Bharatiya Janata Party
- Child agencies: All States Bharatiya Janata Party Information Technology Cell; All Union Territories Bharatiya Janata Party Information Technology Cell

The Bharatiya Janata Party Information Technology Cell (BJP IT Cell) is a specialized department of the Indian political party Bharatiya Janata Party, responsible for managing the party's digital strategy, voter analytics, and social media outreach. It coordinates online campaigns, promotes party policy narratives, and amplifies the communications of party leaders across various digital platforms. Since August 2026, the cell has been headed by Deepak Mhaskey

According to reporting by The Washington Post, the department operates an extensive digital network comprising around 150,000 campaign workers who distribute content across WhatsApp groups to mobilize supporters. The cell has also been subject to scrutiny and criticisms from political opponents, independent researchers, and media watchdogs regarding its methods, including allegations of spreading misinformation, contributing to social tensions, and promoting polarizing narratives targeting religious minorities.

== History ==
The Bharatiya Janata Party (BJP) was among the early political organizations in India to integrate digital platforms and social media into voter mobilization, alongside digital units operated by rival parties such as the Indian National Congress. The official BJP IT Cell was established in 2007 by Prodyut Bora.

Earlier digital efforts were utilized during the 2004 Indian general election, where the party deployed automated telecommunication outreach alongside the India Shining campaign. For the 2009 Indian general election, BJP leader L. K. Advani introduced a personal portal with voter forums while regional IT cells were expanded.

The Twitter (now X) profile for Narendra Modi was established in 2009 during his tenure as Chief Minister of Gujarat. Arvind Gupta was appointed convenor of the IT Cell in 2010, and was succeeded by Amit Malviya in 2015.

In August 2026, Amit Malviya was succeeded by Deepak Mhaskey.

The party's digital campaigning played a prominent role during the 2014 Indian general election. Between late 2012 and 2014, the IT Cell executed structured social media outreach, data analytics monitoring, and real-time response management to support the national campaign.

== Organizational structure and campaign methods ==
An investigative report by digital media outlet Newslaundry detailed the hierarchical structure of the state-level IT Cell operation in Uttar Pradesh:

The state IT cell has 25 members in the core team with Rai as its head. Each regional centre had 20 members and a team of 15 handled IT at each of the 92 districts. Seven member teams worked at the block levels. At the regional, district and Assembly level, BJP had approximately 5,000 workers. A separate team of 20 professionals – including technicians, designers, and cartoonists – created the desired content for the party.

Regarding campaign messaging goals, JPS Rathore of the UP BJP IT Cell stated:

"Our aim was to capture the mind of the voter. To message them night and day. Whenever they look, they should see us, hear our message."

The department has also managed dedicated digital broadcasting platforms, including NaMo TV during electoral campaigns.

== Controversies and criticism ==
The operations of the BJP IT Cell have been a frequent subject of debate among investigative journalists, parliamentary representatives, and platform moderators.

Journalist Swati Chaturvedi reported that coordinated networks of online supporters take direction from digital campaign cells to counter political opponents and public figures on social media platforms. In November 2015, following public remarks by actor Aamir Khan regarding social intolerance, online mobilization led to commercial pressure on corporate sponsors associated with the actor.

In 2017, law enforcement authorities in West Bengal detained a regional IT cell secretary in connection with the distribution of edited video content on Facebook. Parliamentary discussions, including statements by Derek O'Brien in the Rajya Sabha, have raised questions regarding online harassment and accountability on social media platforms.

In December 2020, Twitter applied a "manipulated media" label to a post shared by national convener Amit Malviya during the 2020–2021 Indian farmers' protest, following platform policy reviews on edited video content.

Investigations by media outlets have also documented affiliated voluntary digital groups, such as the "Hindu Ecosystem" network organized by political figures, which coordinate online campaigns focusing on cultural and political topics.
