= Arnab Goswami =

Indian journalist and television news anchor (born 1973)

- Goswami in Wikimedia Conference
- Born: Arnab Ranjan Goswami; 7 March 1973 (age 53); Guwahati, Assam, India
- Education: Hindu College (BA); St Antony's College, Oxford (MA)
- Occupations: Journalist; News anchor
- Years active: 1995–present
- Employers: NDTV (1996–2006); Times Now (2006–2016); Republic TV (2017–present)
- Notable credit(s): The Newshour; Frankly Speaking with Arnab; The Debate With Arnab Goswami; Nation Wants To Know
- Spouse: Samyabrata Ray Goswami
- Children: 1
- Awards: Asian Television Awards (2004); Ramnath Goenka Excellence in Journalism Awards (2008); Media personality of the year GQ India (2010); Assamese of the year (2010); News anchor of the year IAA Leadership Awards (2014); Media person of the year IAA Leadership Awards (2018)
- Arnab Goswami's voice in Hindi Goswami discussing three obsessions of India

Arnab Ranjan Goswami (born 7 March 1973) is an Indian news anchor, journalist and media executive. He is the managing director and editor-in-chief of Republic Media Network.

Goswami began his career at The Telegraph before joining NDTV. He was the editor-in-chief and a news anchor of Times Now from 2006 to 2016. On Times Now, he anchored The Newshour and Frankly Speaking with Arnab which propelled him to widespread fame. In November 2016, Goswami resigned as editor-in-chief of Times Now. His news channel Republic TV was launched in May 2017.

== Early life and family ==
=== Family ===
Goswami was born in Guwahati, Assam on 7 March 1973 in an Assamese family of Manoranjan Goswami and Suprabha Gain-Goswami. His father, Manoranjan Goswami joined the Indian Army in the early 1960s and retired as a colonel after serving in the army for nearly 30 years. Upon retirement he joined the Bharatiya Janata Party and was the party's unsuccessful candidate in 1998 Lok Sabha Polls for the Guwahati constituency. He wrote various columns, books and was the recipient of the Asam Sahitya Sabha Award in 2017. Arnab's mother, Suprabha Gain-Goswami is an author.

His paternal grandfather Rajani Kanta Goswami was a lawyer. His maternal grandfather, Gaurisankar Bhattacharyya, was an elected legislator from the Communist Party of India and served as the leader of the opposition in Assam for many years.

Goswami's maternal uncle, Siddhartha Bhattacharya is a member of the Assam Legislative Assembly for the BJP from Gauhati East constituency. He headed the Assam unit of BJP until 2015.

Goswami is married to Samyabrata Ray Goswami. She is also a journalist and a co-owner of Republic TV. The couple has a son, Che Goswami, named after the revolutionary Che Guevara.

=== Education ===
An army officer's son, Goswami attended schools across various parts of India. He completed his 10th grade of school from the Mount St Mary's School, New Delhi and his 12th grade from Kendriya Vidyalaya in Jabalpur cantonment. Goswami has a Bachelor's degree in Sociology from the Hindu College in Delhi University. In 1994 Goswami completed his Master's in Social Anthropology from St. Antony's College, at Oxford University, where he was a Felix Scholar.

In the year 2000, Arnab was a Visiting DC Pavate Fellow at the International Studies Department at Sidney Sussex College, Cambridge University.

== Career ==
=== The Telegraph and NDTV ===
Goswami started his career with The Telegraph in Kolkata, as a journalist; less than a year later, he moved to Delhi and joined NDTV.

Goswami was a part of NDTV from 1996 to 2006. At NDTV, he anchored daily newscasts including News Tonight, a programme telecast on DD Metro. Newsnight, hosted by Goswami, won him an award for the Best News Anchor of Asia in the 2004 Asian Television Awards.

=== Times Now ===
In 2006, Goswami left NDTV to join the newly launched Times Now news channel, as its editor-in-chief.

His show The Newshour was aired at 9 pm with live news coverage, and featured notable personalities such as Pervez Musharraf. He also hosted a special programme, Frankly Speaking with Arnab, which has featured personalities such as Benazir Bhutto and former UK Prime Minister Gordon Brown, Afghanistan President Hamid Karzai, retired head of state of the Tibetan Government in Exile, the Dalai Lama and former United States Secretary of State Hillary Clinton. Goswami was the first television anchor to interview Prime Minister Narendra Modi after he took office in 2014.

Goswami resigned as editor-in-chief of Times Now on 1 November 2016 citing editorial differences, lack of journalistic freedom and newsroom politics. He hosted the last edition of his flagship show The Newshour Debate, a fortnight later. Incidentally, the Newshour has been subject to an ongoing investigation by Ofcom, the UK government-approved regulatory authority for broadcasting, during the months of August and September and it went on to hold Times Now guilty of violating the impartiality clause of its broadcast code.

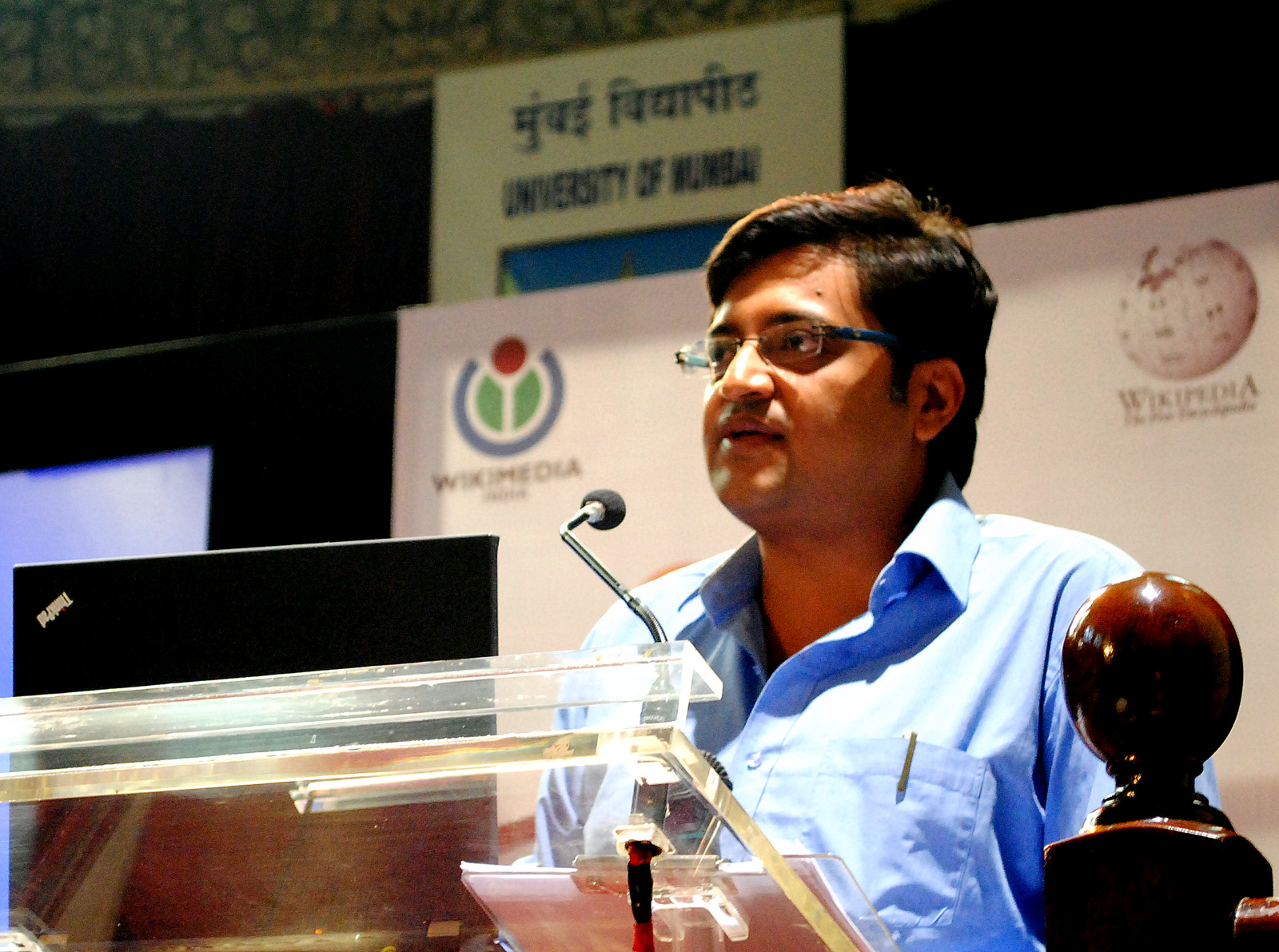
Goswami speaking at Wiki Conference in Mumbai, 2011

=== Republic TV ===
Republic TV was funded in part by Asianet, which in turn was primarily funded by Rajeev Chandrasekhar, a then-independent member of Rajya Sabha who had intricate links with the Bharatiya Janata Party and was vice-chairman of the National Democratic Alliance in Kerala. Rajeev later announced his resignation as the director on the board of ARG Outlier Asianet News Pvt Ltd, the company that owns Republic TV. He stated that he took this decision since he officially joined the BJP and it was in the best interest of Republic TV's brand and team that he no longer serve on the board. Among other major investors were Goswami, his wife, educationists Ramdas Pai and Ramakanta Panda—all of whom invested through SARG Media Holding Private Ltd.

Goswami was the managing director as well the Editor-in-Chief; the channel was launched on 6 May 2017 as a free-to-air channel. Chitra Subramaniam was roped in as the editorial adviser and numerous personas associated with Times Now in various roles joined the channel.

In May 2019, Goswami bought a chunk of shares held by Rajeev Chandrasekhar-promoted Asianet News Media & Entertainment to gain near full ownership. Later Republic Media Network released a statement stating that Goswami personally owns over 82 per cent stake in Republic TV and that the company also owns 99 per cent equity in the downstream digital entity that controls the digital assets of the network.

=== Resignation from Editors Guild ===
In the wake of the 2020 Palghar mob lynching, on 21 April 2020, during his live show, Arnab resigned from Editors Guild. Arnab accused Shekhar Gupta of leading the compromise on journalism for not speaking on incidents like this. Nagpur police registered a first information report against Arnab Goswami over a complaint filed by Maharashtra Power Minister Nitin Raut. The FIR filed by the police include charges of giving provocation with intent to cause riot, promoting enmity between two groups on grounds of religion or race, deliberate and malicious acts intended to outrage religious feelings of any class by insulting its religion or religious beliefs and defamation under relevant sections of the Indian Penal Code.

=== Book ===
In 2002, Goswami wrote a book: Combating Terrorism: The Legal Challenge.

== Reception ==
Modi's supporters often get their news from Republic TV, which features shouting matches, public shamings, and scathing insults of all but the most slavish Modi partisans. Founded in 2017 with B.J.P. support, Republic TV stars Arnab Goswami, a floppy-haired Oxford graduate who acts as a kind of public scourge for opponents of Modi's initiatives.

In a typical program, from 2017, Goswami mentioned a law mandating that cinemas play the national anthem, and asked whether people should be required to stand; his guest Waris Pathan, a Muslim assemblyman, argued that it should be a matter of choice.

Why can't you stand up? – Goswami shouted at Pathan. Before Pathan could get out an answer, he yelled again, Why can't you stand up? What's your problem with it?
Pathan kept trying, but Goswami, his hair flying, shouted over him:- I’ll tell you why, because—I’ll tell you why. I’ll tell you. I’ll tell you why. Can I tell you? Then why don't you stop, and I’ll tell you why? Don't be an anti-national! Don't be an anti-national! Don't be an anti-national!...

— Dexter Filkins, "Blood and Soil in Narendra Modi's India". The New Yorker. 2 December 2019.

Goswami and his style of journalism have been subjected to massive criticism.

He has been noted for his opinionated reporting in support of Bharatiya Janata Party and Hindutva across a wide spectrum of situations including by uncritical reproduction of government narratives, avoiding criticism of figures from the ruling party (BJP) and presenting political opponents in a negative light. Goswami has been also linked with the popularisation of the neologisms – Urban Naxal and Anti-national – to denote those critical to right wing sentiments or the government, in a bid to evoke hyper-nationalism among the audience. Attempts to quell communal tensions through irresponsible reporting containing religious overtones have been alleged.

Republic TV has been since compared to North Korean media for its extreme pro-government affinity and muzzling of dissent; noted political scientist Christophe Jaffrelot and journalist Dexter Filkins have compared it to Fox News, an American TV channel that practices journalism which is in favour of the right wing Republican Party. Vanita Kohli-Khandekar, over Business Standard, noted it to be a "noisy, chaotic place where coherent debate without shouting, screaming and name-calling is impossible"; others have noted of its shows to be a "battle of babble", judgemental, brash and hawkish. Vaishnavi Chandrashekhar, in a Foreign Policy article, noted its coverage of the 2019 India-Pakistan conflict, to put jingoism ahead of journalism.

Fact checkers have documented him, and his channels to have propagated misinformation and disinformation, on multiple occasions.

== Controversies ==
He has been accused of opinionated reporting in support of Bharatiya Janata Party and Hindutva across a wide spectrum of situations – including by uncritical reproduction of government narratives, avoiding criticism of figures from the ruling party (BJP), and presenting political opponents in a negative light.

=== Tharoor defamation case ===
On 26 May 2017, parliamentarian Shashi Tharoor filed a civil defamation case in the Delhi High Court against Goswami and Republic TV in connection with the channel's broadcast of news items from 8 to 13 May claiming his link in his wife Sunanda Pushkar's death in 2014. Seeking the channel's response, Justice Manmohan of the High Court said, "Bring down the rhetoric. You can put out your story, you can put out the facts. You cannot call him names. That is uncalled for."

=== News Broadcasting Standards Authority (NBSA) censures ===
On 30 August 2018, News Broadcasting Standards Authority (NBSA) of India demanded Republic TV to tender a full-screen apology for use of multiple objectionable words to describe a bunch of people at a political rally, who were harassing one of his journalists. Republic TV "removed the video from its website and YouTube account" after receiving the complaint but refused to comply with the NBSA order, instead filing an appeal.

In October 2019, RepublicTV was again asked to broadcast a public apology, after the channel declined to co-operate in a case accusing Goswami of violating the standard prohibitions on racial and religious stereotyping and instead commented on NBSA to have engaged in "intense pseudo-judicial oversight". Republic TV did not abide by the order; incidentally, Goswami was the convener of the committee that drafted the code, years back.

=== 2020 Palghar mob lynching ===
In connection with the 2020 Palghar mob lynching case, several first information reports were filed against Goswami, regarding his alleged use of inflammatory language, as well as claims of misinformation.

=== Confrontation between Arnab Goswami and Uddhav Thackeray ===
Two Republic TV staff and a taxi driver were arrested on 8 September 2020 for allegedly trespassing on a farmhouse of Maharashtra Chief Minister Uddhav Thackeray in Raigad district. The issue has since snowballed into a confrontation between Arnab Goswami and the Uddhav Thackeray government. Arnab on 11 September 2020 issued a statement demanding the release of the journalists. He also alleged that the leaders of the Shiv Sena had threatened cable operators to "black out" Republic Bharat, Republic TV's Hindi channel.

=== Abetment of suicide case ===
Goswami was arrested on 4 November 2020 in a 2018 suicide case of Anvay Naik under Section 306 and Section 34 of IPC by Mumbai Police. Naik, in his suicide note had alleged non payment of dues from three individuals including Goswami, as the reason for ending his life. He was released on interim bail ordered by the Supreme Court of India on 11 November 2020.

=== TRP manipulation scam and leaked messages ===
In October 2020, the Mumbai police began investigating potential manipulation of target rating points, on the basis of a complaint filed to them. Target rating points are a metric used to evaluate the reach of television and broadcast channels to their intended audience. The complaint alleged that several persons, including the former CEO of the Broadcast Audience Research Council, Partho Dasgupta, had collaborated with broadcast channels to advertise misleading viewership ratings. One of the channels against which such allegations had been made was Republic TV, with specific allegations against Goswami. During the course of investigations, Mumbai Police officials seized a phone belonging to Partho Dasgupta, and filed several volumes of chats allegedly exchanged between Dasgupta and Goswami on the WhatsApp messaging service in the court as part of their charge sheet. Two volumes of these messages were leaked publicly, containing alleged messages showing close links between Dasgupta and Goswami. These messages allegedly contain indications of manipulation of TRPs, as well as evidence that Goswami had access to privileged information and had interceded on Dasgupto's behalf with regulatory and government authorities.

The leaking of these messages led to widespread condemnation of Goswami and Dasgupta, both for alleged corrupt practices as well as for several comments attributed to them. The News Broadcasters' Association publicly called for the expulsion of Republic TV from the Indian Broadcasting Foundation, pointing to Goswami's messages as a reason. On the basis of these leaked messages, there have also been several calls for legal action against Goswami as one of the messages attributed to him allegedly indicates that he had access to privileged information concerning the 2019 Balakot airstrike before it was in the public domain, and that he had shared this privileged information with Dasgupta. On 20 January 2021, Maharashtra Home Minister Anil Deshmukh stated that he was considering initiating legal action against Goswami for violating the Official Secrets Act 1923. On 27 January 2021, Congress leaders filed a criminal complaint against Goswami in Mumbai, alleging violations of the Official Secrets Act.

On 22 June 2021 Mumbai Police Names Arnab Goswami, Republic TV Chief, As Accused In TRP Scam Chargesheet. The police named Goswami and four others from ARG Outlier Media (that owns Republic TV) in their 1800-page supplementary charge sheet submitted in the Esplanade Metropolitan Magistrate Court.The court noted that false evidence supported the argument when it issued the order earlier. In court, the Maharashtra state argued that Arnab Goswami and his channel Republic TV were the targets of falsified cases and evidence. On 6 March 2024, Mumbai court approved the Mumbai Police's request to withdraw all charges related to the 2020 TRP fraud. The Maharashtra government made the decision to drop the prosecution.

=== Kabul Serena Hotel remarks ===
In his show on Republic TV on 18 September 2021, Goswami claimed that Pakistani ISI agents were staying on the fifth floor of the Serena Hotel in Kabul and abetting Afghan Taliban fighters in Panjshir. In reality, the hotel had only two floors, as was immediately pointed out by a Pakistani panellist. This led to Goswami being lampooned on social media.

=== Dr. Rajendra Kumar Pachauri v. Indu jain & Others ===
On 25 May 2023, Goswami tendered his unconditional apology before the Delhi High Court in a 2016 contempt case moved by the former Executive Vice-Chairman of The Energy and Resources Institute, R.K. Pachauri. Pachauri had filed a plea in 2016, contending that the media houses were in contempt of court orders on publishing any news report or article or opinion relating to an ongoing case about allegations of sexual harassment against him. Several other media figures and companies were also mentioned in the plea filed by R.K. Pachauri, including Bennet & Coleman, The Economic Times, Raghav Ohri and Prannoy Roy.

=== False information allegations (2025) ===
In May 2025, the Indian National Congress filed a First Information Report (FIR) against Goswami, editor-in-chief of Republic TV, and Amit Malviya, head of the Bharatiya Janata Party's (BJP) IT cell. The complaint alleged that both individuals were involved in disseminating false information as part of a misleading campaign.

== In popular culture ==
Barely Speaking with Arnub, an Indian mock comedy-talk-show produced by The Viral Fever spoofs Goswami's on-air personality with Biswapati Sarkar playing a caricaturised version of him.

== Honors and awards ==
- 2004: Best Presenter or Anchor in Asian Television Awards
- Goswami had won the Ramnath Goenka Award for Excellence in Journalism (TV) in 2008.
- 2010: TV Personality of the Year category in the Men of the Year awards by GQ India
- 2010: Assamese of the Year by News Live, presented by Chief Minister of Assam
- 2014: News Anchor of the Year at IAA Leadership Awards
- 2018: Mediaperson of the Year Award at IAA Leadership Awards
- On 8 December 2019, he was unanimously elected as the President of News Broadcasting Federation, a newly formed federation of about 78 channels, which sought to replace NBSA.
