= Asianet News Network =

Indian news media company

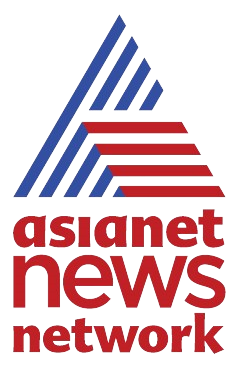
- Logo used since 2003
- Type: Media conglomerate
- Country: India

Ownership
- Owner: Asianxt Digital Technologies

History
- Founded: 30 September 1995; 29 years ago
- Founder: Raji Menon

Links
- Website: www.asianetnews.com

Asianet News Network (ANN) is an independent news channel headquartered in India.

It started as the news department of Asianet, introducing private sector Malayalam news broadcasts in Kerala in 1995. Its first broadcast on 30 September 1995 was also the first live television news broadcast in India. In 2003, it became a 24-hour Malayalam news channel, and became independent in 2009.

It is owned by Asianxt DigitalTechnologies. ANN news brands including Asianet News in Malayalam; Asianet Suvarna News in Kannada; and the Kannada Prabha daily newspaper.

== Management ==
In 2015, it hired Sugata Srinivasaraju as editorial director.

In February 2025, Neeraj Kohli was promoted from chief financial officer to chairman of the Asianet News Network. Frank Thomas was promoted to CEO.
