= Media buying =

Purchase of advertising space on mass media

Media buying refers to the procurement of advertising on media such as a television, newspapers, commercial radio, magazines, websites, mobile apps, over-the-top media services, out-of-home advertising, and others. It also includes price negotiation and the appropriate placement of ads based on research to reach the right audiences considering the product, service, and message being advertised. A media buyer is tasked to perform such activities.

== Media buyers ==
Media buyers negotiate and purchase advertising spaces across a mix of traditional and digital media to ensure that advertisers maximize performance against their campaign goals.

=== TV buying ===
Rates, demand of leads, space, and time, and state licenses vary by state. Media buyers will often target local markets (defined as Designated Market Areas, or DMAs, for television and Metropolitan Statistical Area, or MSAs, for Radio). Media buyers target these areas to align broadcast purchases with geographic regions most relevant to the advertiser's audience, which helps to optimize ad exposure and efficiency. They use demographic data (typically referred to as “ratings data” provided by measurement companies such as comScore and Nielsen) within these areas to ensure ads reach the intended consumers, increasing campaign effectiveness. National media buyers need national media planning to generate national media marketing strategies and national media advertising that can be adaptable from area to area but also work on a national level.

There is an apparent distinction between general marketing media buyers and direct response media buyers (DRMB). General market media buyers enact or actualize media plans drawn up by media planners. They negotiate rates and create media schedules based on a media plan constructed by a media planner. Through the media planner, general market media buyers rely on published cost per point guides. An experienced DRMB knows which stations generate a specific quantity of response and knows within reason, the break even point of the expenditure versus the return. With that information, the DRMB is efficient in negotiating a functional rate and in purchasing media from the appropriate stations. The DRMB attaches unique phone numbers to each station they purchase media from and track the sales, and make adjustments to the media plan and schedule as necessary to optimize results. DRMB can be short-form or long-form, although long-form is becoming increasingly unpopular. With these differing methodologies, direct response marketing can be considered a specialized arena - although some agencies considered to be DR-focused also execute and implement general deals.

== Media research ==
Media research planning can be done by media buyers as well as media specialists. Depending on product and service, Media Buyers and Media Specialists must do a fair amount of research to determine how best to spend the allotted budget. This includes research on the target audience and what type of medium will work best to reach the largest number of consumers with the most effective method. Media planners and media specialists have a vast array of media outlets at their disposal, both traditional media and digital media. Traditional media would include radio, TV, print, and out of home. New media might include satellite TV, cable TV, satellite radio, and internet. The internet offers a number of online media channels that have surfaced with the improvement of technology and the accessibility of the internet. Online Media can include social media, emails, search engines and referral links, web portals, banners, interactive games, and video clips. Media Planners and Specialists can pick and choose what and/or which combination of media is most appropriate and effective to achieve their goal, whether it is to make a sale, and/or to deliver a message or idea. They can also strategize and make use of product placements and Positioning. Inserting advertisements such as print ads in newspapers and magazines, buying impressions for advertisements on the internet, and airing commercials on the radio or TV, can be used by both Direct-response and remnant advertisers.

All the major marketing services holding companies own specialist media-buying operations.

== History ==
Prior to the late 1990s, media buying was generally carried out by the media department of an advertising agency. The split between creative agencies and media agencies is often referred to as "unbundling". In 1999, WPP Group created MindShare from the media departments of its two advertising networks, Ogilvy & Mather and J. Walter Thompson (JWT).

In 2003, after purchasing Young & Rubicam and Tempus, WPP further consolidated all of its media operations including media buying and media planning through the formation of GroupM, which is now the number one media investment management company in terms of billings. The other major media holdings include Omnicom's OMD, Publicis's Vivaki and ZenithOptimedia, Interpublic's Mediabrands, Dentsu Aegis Network's Aegis Media and Havas's Havas Media.

With the conglomeration of major marketing services holding companies and the movement among top executives from them during the 2008 financial crisis, a number of small to midsize media buying agencies in the US have since been given equal opportunity to compete for media buying business once only considered serviceable by the largest of Advertising agencies.

== Tools used ==
- Online Advertising Research Tools comScore, Nielsen Online, Quantcast, SimilarWeb, Thalamus, SpyFu, SRDS, and Compete.
- Online Advertising Competitive Intelligence Tools – comScore, Integral Ad Science, MOAT, Adbeat, Whatrunswhere, Keywordspy.
- Demand-side Platforms – Doubleclick Bid Manager, Turn, AppNexus, Adobe Media Optimizer, Rubicon Project.
- Offline Advertising Research Tools – comScore TV, Nielsen Media Research for TV Audience Measurement GRPs, Nielsen Audio for Radio Measurement (previously known as Arbitron), SRDS by Kantar Media for Print Advertising Ratecards.

== See also ==
- Account planning
- Advertising campaign
- Advertising management
- Advertising media
- Advertising media selection
- Ad tracking
- Advertising research
- AttentionTracking
- AIDA
- Audience measurement
- Consumer behaviour
- DAGMAR
- Frequency (marketing)
- Integrated marketing communications
- Magazine circulation
- Marketing communications
- Mass media
- National Readership Survey
- Newspaper circulation
- Nielsen Ratings
- Nielsen Audio
- Positioning (marketing)
- Projective techniques
- Promotion
- Promotional mix
- Reach (advertising)
