= Ad tracking =

In-market research of a brand's performance

Ad tracking, also known as post-testing or ad effectiveness tracking, is in-market research that monitors a brand’s performance including brand and advertising awareness, product trial and usage, and attitudes about the brand versus their competition.

Depending on the speed of the purchase cycle in the category, tracking can be done continuously (a few interviews every week) or it can be “pulsed,” with interviews conducted in widely spaced waves (for example, every three or six months). Interviews can either be conducted with separate, matched samples of consumers, or with a single (longitudinal) panel that is interviewed over time.

Since the researcher has information on when the ads launched, the length of each advertising flight, the money spent, and when the interviews were conducted, the results of ad tracking can provide information on the effects of advertising.

== Purpose ==
The purpose of ad tracking is generally to provide a measure of the combined effect of the media weight or spending level, the effectiveness of the media buy or targeting, and the quality of the advertising executions or creative.

Advertisers use the results of ad tracking to estimate the return on investment (ROI) of advertising, and to refine advertising plans. Sometimes, tracking data are used to provide inputs to Marketing Mix Models which marketing science statisticians build to estimate the role of advertising, as compared to pricing, distribution and other marketplace variables on sales of the brand.

== Methodology ==
Today, most ad tracking studies are conducted via the Internet. Some ad tracking studies are conducted continuously and others are conducted at specific points in time (typically before the advertising appears in market, and then again after the advertising has been running for some period of time). The two approaches use different types of analyses, although both start by measuring advertising awareness. Typically, the respondent is either shown a brief portion of a commercial or a few memorable still images from the TV ad. Other media typically are cued using either branded or de-branded visual of the ad. Then, respondents answer three significant questions.

1. Do you recognize this ad? (recognition measure)
2. Please type in the sponsor of this ad. (unaided awareness measure)
3. Please choose from the following list, the sponsor of this ad. (aided awareness measure)

The continuous tracking design analyzes advertising awareness over time, in relation to ad spending; separately, this design tracks brand awareness, and then develops indices of effectiveness based on the strength of the correlations between ad spending and brand awareness.

A popular alternate approach to the continuous tracking design is a longitudinal design, in which the same people are interviewed at two points in time. Changes in brand measures (for example, brand purchasing and future purchase intentions) exhibited among those who have seen the advertising are compared to the changes in brand measures that occurred among those unaware of advertising. By means of this method, the researchers can isolate those marketplace changes that were produced by advertising versus those that would have occurred without advertising.

== Internet tracking ==
There are several tools to track online ads: banner ads, ppc ads, pop-up ads, and other types. Many online advertising companies such as Google offer their own ad tracking service (Google Analytics) in order to effectively use their service to generate a positive ROI. Third-party ad tracking services are commonly used by affiliate marketers. Affiliate marketers are frequently unable to have access to the order page and therefore are unable to use a 3rd-party tool. Many companies have created tools to effectively track their commissions in order to optimize their profit potential. The information provided will show the marketer which advertising methods are generating income and which are not, and allows him to effectively allocate his budget.

Last-click attribution means the belief that the last ad a person saw actually generated the sale, which is often not the case. However, if a person saw an ad on one website before switching to another and then made a purchase, there is a chance the data cannot be shared after the person changed sites, meaning only last-click attribution is available.

== Measures ==
Here is a list of some data a post-test might provide:

- Top of mind awareness
- Unaided brand awareness
- Aided brand awareness
- Brand fit
- Brand image ratings
- Brand trial
- Engagement/ involvement
- Repeat purchase
- Frequency of use
- Price perceptions
- Unaided advertising awareness
- Aided advertising awareness
- Unaided advertising message recall
- Aided advertising message recall
- Aided commercial recall
- Ad wear out
- Promotion awareness and usage
- Purchase intention
- Market segment characteristics
- Media habits
- Lifestyle/Psychographics
- Demographics

== See also ==
- Advertising
- Advertising management
- Advertising Research
- Brand management
- Frequency (marketing)
- Integrated marketing communications
- Marketing research
- Web analytics
- Advertising Checking Bureau
- Branding
- Communicus
- Brand Image
- Brand Linkage
- Global Advertising
- Marketing
- Marketing communications
- Mass media
- Media planning
- Marketing research
- Motivation
- New media
- Positioning (marketing)
- Promotion
- Promotional mix
- Reach (advertising)
