= Advertising research =

Study conducted to improve advertising

Advertising research is a systematic process of marketing research conducted to improve the efficiency of advertising. Advertising research is a detailed study conducted to know how customers respond to a particular ad or advertising campaign.

== History ==
The highlighted events of the history of advertising research include:

1879 – N. W. Ayer conducts custom research in an attempt to win the advertising business of Nichols-Shepard Co., a manufacturer of agricultural machinery.

1895 – Harlow Gale of the University of Minnesota mails questionnaires to gather opinions about advertising from the public.

1900s – George B. Waldron conducts qualitative research for Mahin’s Advertising Agency.

1910s – 1911 can be considered the year marketing research becomes an industry. That year, J. George Frederick leaves his position as editor of Printers' Ink to begin his research company, the Business Bourse with clients such as General Electric and the Texas Co. Also in 1911, Kellogg's ad manager, R. O. Eastman creates the Association of National Advertisers which is now known as the Association of National Advertising Managers. The group’s first project is a postcard questionnaire to determine magazine readership. The results introduce the concept of duplication of circulation. In 1916, R. O. Eastman starts his own company, the Eastman Research Bureau which boasts clients such as Cosmopolitan, Christian Herald, and General Electric.

1920s – In 1922, Dr. Daniel Starch tests reader recognition levels of magazine and newspaper advertisements and editorial content. In 1923, Dr. George Gallup begins measuring advertising readership.

1930s – In 1936, Dr. George Gallup validates his survey methodology by using the same tools polling voters during public elections. This allows him to successfully compare and validate his study's results against the election’s results.

1940s – Post World War II, the U.S. sees a large increase in the number of market research companies.

1950s – Market researchers focus on improving methods and measures. In their search for a single-number statistic to capture the overall performance of the advertising creative, Day-After-Recall (DAR) is created.

1960s – Qualitative focus groups gain in popularity. In addition, some advertisers call for more rigorous measurement of the in-market effectiveness of advertising in order to provide better accountability for the large amounts being spent on advertising. In response, Seymour Smith and Associates, using Advertising Research Foundation data as a jumping-off point, develops the Communicus System, a comprehensive approach to isolating the in-market impact of advertising across media.

1970s – Computers emerge as business tools, allowing researchers to conduct large-scale data manipulations. (Honomichl p. 175) Multiple studies prove DAR (Recall) scores do not predict sales. The measure, persuasion, also known as motivation, is validated as a predictor of sales. The measure known as “breakthrough” is re-examined by researchers who make a distinction between the attention-getting power of the creative execution (attention) and how well “branded” the ad is (brand linkage). Herbert Krugman seeks to measure non-verbal measures biologically by tracking brain wave activities as respondents watch commercials. (Krugman) Others experiment with galvanic skin response, voice pitch analysis, and eye-tracking.

1980s – Researchers begin to view commercials as a “structured flow of experience” rather than a single unit to be rated on the whole, creating moment-by-moment systems such as the dial-a-meter.

1990s – Ameritest Research creates Picture Sorts to provide accurate non-verbal measurements in a moment-by-moment system. Picture Sorts results are graphed to visually represent commercial viewers' moment-by-moment image recognition (Flow of Attention), positive and negative feelings (Flow of Emotion), and brand values (Flow of Meaning). Trends in in-market tracking include a greater focus on the multimedia nature of entire advertising campaigns.

2000s – Global advertisers seek an integrated marketing research system that will work worldwide so they can compare results across countries. For a look at trends predicted for advertising research in the 21st century, see Seven Trends for the Future. Dr. Robert Heath publishes the seminal and controversial monograph “The Hidden Power of Advertising” which challenged the traditional models used in advertising research and shows how most advertising is processed at an emotional level (not a rational level). His monograph leads to re-examination of in-market research approaches that compare the behaviors of those who have seen advertising versus those who have not, such as the Communicus System, and the development of brand new pretesting systems such as the OTX AdCEP system.

== Types ==
There are two types of research, customized and syndicated. Customized research is conducted for a specific client to address that client’s needs. Only that client has access to the results of the research. Syndicated research is a single research study conducted by a research company with its results available, for sale, to multiple companies. Pre-market research can be conducted to optimize advertisements for any medium: radio, television, print (magazine, newspaper or direct mail), outdoor billboard (highway, bus, or train), or Internet. Different methods would be applied to gather the necessary data appropriately. Post-testing is conducted after the advertising, either a single ad or an entire multimedia campaign has been run in-market. The focus is on what the advertising has done for the brand, for example increasing brand awareness, trial, frequency of purchasing.

=== Pre-testing ===
Pre-testing, also known as copy testing, is a specialized field of marketing research that determines an ad’s effectiveness based on consumer responses, feedback, and behavior. Pre-testing is conducted before implementing the advertisement to customers. The following methods can be followed to pre-test an advertisement:

- Focus group discussion
- In-depth interview
- Projective techniques
- Checklist method
- Consumer jury method
- Sales area test
- Questionnaire method
- Recall test
- Readability test
- Eye movement test

=== Campaign pre-testing ===
A new area of pre-testing driven by the realization that what works on TV does not necessarily translate in other media. Greater budgets allocated to digital media in particular have driven the need for campaign pre-testing. The addition of a media planning tool to this testing approach allows advertisers to test the whole campaign, creative and media, and measures the synergies expected with an integrated campaign.

=== Post-testing ===
Post-testing/Tracking studies provide either periodic or continuous in-market research monitoring a brand’s performance, including brand awareness, brand preference, product usage and attitudes. Large-scale field studies have also been used to evaluate advertising effectiveness. Analyses of real-world television advertising tests found that increased advertising weight produced significant average sales effects for established products in more recent tests, suggesting that television advertising effectiveness had increased over time. Some post-testing approaches simply track changes over time, while others use various methods to quantify the specific changes produced by advertising—either the campaign as a whole or by the different media utilized.

Overall, advertisers use post-testing to plan future advertising campaigns, so the approaches that provide the most detailed information on the accomplishments of the campaign are most valued. The two types of campaign post-testing that have achieved the greatest use among major advertisers include continuous tracking, in which changes in advertising spending are correlated with changes in brand awareness, and longitudinal studies, in which the same group of respondents are tracked over time. With the longitudinal approach, it is possible to go beyond brand awareness, and to isolate the campaign's impact on specific behavioral and perceptual dimensions, and to isolate campaign impact by media.

== Attribution and causal lift measurement ==
Attribution models allocate conversion credit across ad exposures using observed user paths rather than experimental manipulation. These include rules-based systems such as last-touch or first-touch, as well as data-driven multi-touch attribution (MTA). They are computationally tractable and can be applied continuously, but they rely on observational data and are therefore subject to selection bias: users who see ads systematically differ from those who do not, and advertising's effect on individual-level outcomes is small relative to the variance in those outcomes.

Incrementality experiments are randomized holdout tests that compare outcomes for exposed and unexposed groups. They offer a causal alternative to attribution, but research has found that they frequently produce estimates that diverge substantially from attribution-based figures. Using fifteen large field experiments at Facebook, Gordon et al. showed that matching and regression-based observational methods overestimated advertising effectiveness relative to randomized controlled trials; in half of the studies, the estimated lift was off by a factor of three across all methods. A subsequent large-scale replication using 663 Facebook experiments confirmed that non-experimental methods continue to overestimate causal effects even when flexible machine-learning estimators are applied.

Google developed geo experiments, in which non-overlapping geographic regions are randomly assigned to treatment or control conditions, as a practical method for obtaining causal estimates of advertising return on investment at scale without individual-level randomization.

Facebook's Conversion Lift product similarly uses randomized test and control groups to isolate incremental conversions attributable to ads. Meta has recommended using lift results to calibrate attribution models when the two diverge.

== Attention ==
In advertising research, attention is the qualitative measure of an advertisement's effectiveness in arousing interest in a viewer. Qualitative is a measurement that is based on peoples emotions and opinions of the advertisement.

Focus Group based methodologies can be used to collect qualitative responses which inform a measure of attention to an advertisement in a simulated environment. One example of this is a "dummy advertising vehicle test," in which a test Television Advertisement is shown with control ads in a controlled environment designed to simulate a commercial break on television. The test ad is embedded alongside either directly competitive advertising, or ads from non-competing product categories, depending on the advertiser's preference. Respondents are asked the question "Which of these ads did you find interesting?" If the test ad is spontaneously mentioned, then that response is counted toward the attention score.

Quantitative techniques such as Eye Tracking are used to measure attention and spontaneous response to marketing messages. Quantitative measurements are based on data and numbers that are gathered from studies based on how people react to the advertisements . Attention data using this methodology can be collected in a variety of simulated environments such as at home or work, as well as across a variety of different screens and devices. In addition to measuring attention, this data can be used by advertisers to optimize the design and placement of advertisements.

=== Attention grabbers ===
Advertisers like to make people feel things in order to gain their attention. This can be done in a number of ways;

- Association – Using images that you associate with something good or a good feeling.
- Call to action – "Buy today" a way to remove doubt about the next step
- Claim – Letting you know how to products helps you and works
- Color – Different colors are said to bring out different emotions in people. Companies carefully choose the colors they use in their logos and advertisement based on the feeling they want to portray.
- Games and activities – A commercial that is in the form of a game for you to experience in a more fun way. This helps you understand it better.
- Humor – Using ads to make you laugh and so that it will be a funny memory that you remember.
- Hype – Words like amazing and incredible making products seem "hyped"
- Language – Companies use language to get attention. Words that induce humor, fear, excitement are memorable.
- Must-have – A product that you must have and is popular
- Fear – Solving something that you have to worry about like smelly shoes
- Prizes, sweepstakes, and gifts – The chance of winning something for free to attract attention
- Repetition – Repeating your idea or message so that consumers remember it.
- Sales and price – Discounts prices so that a product looks like a better deal
- Sense appeal – Using content that appeals to your 5 senses.
- Size – Larger images will attract attention more than smaller images.
- Special ingredients – Showing that this product works better than others because of this special ingredient.
- Testimonials and endorsements – Using the power of celebrities and their following to grab attention and be convincing.

=== Measurements ===
Eye-tracking techniques can be measured by observing the eye movement and pupil dilation when looking at an advertisement.

== Terminology ==
- Adcept
- Advertising
- Awareness
- Brand preference
- Shockvertising

== See also ==
- Advertising agency
- Advertising effects: theoretical overview
- Advertising management
- Advertising media selection
- Attention economy
- AIDA
- Ameritest
- Brand awareness
- Brand management
- Brand
- Consumer behaviour
- Communicus
- Cross-sectional data
- DAGMAR
- Frequency (marketing)
- Global Marketing
- Guerrilla marketing
- Impulse purchase
- Infomercials
- Integrated marketing communications
- Marketing
- Marketing communications
- Marketing research
- Mass media
- Media planning
- Motivation
- New media
- David Ogilvy
- Panel analysis
- Positioning (marketing)
- Promotion
- Promotional mix
- Selective perception
- Reach (advertising)
- Television advertisement
- Viral marketing
- Web analytics

=== Advertising research methods ===
- Ad tracking
- AttentionTracking
- Copy testing
