= Word-of-mouth marketing =

Type of marketing

Word-of-mouth marketing (WOMM, WOM marketing, also called word-of-mouth advertising) is the communication between consumers about a product, service, or company in which the sources are considered independent of direct commercial influence that has been actively influenced or encouraged as a marketing effort (e.g. 'seeding' a message in a network rewarding regular consumers to engage in WOM, employing WOM 'agents'). While it is difficult to truly control word-of-mouth communication, there are three generic avenues to 'manage' such communication for the purpose of word-of-mouth marketing, including:

- Building a strong WOM foundation (building brand loyalty, trust and satisfaction)
- Indirect WOM management (advertisement and other promotional strategies)
- Direct WOMM management (viral marketing and electronic communication)

The success of word-of-mouth marketing depends heavily on the nature of the loyalty rewards used. When companies utilize poor incentives to motivate consumers or agents to spread positive word of mouth about products or brands, the campaigns backfire.

== History ==
In the early 1970s, psychologist George Silverman pioneered word-of-mouth marketing by creating "teleconferenced peer influence groups" aimed at engaging physicians in discussions concerning new pharmaceutical products. Through his conduction of these focus groups, Silverman noted that physicians with positive experiences regarding a particular drug could influence skeptical peers, including a dissatisfied group of ex-prescribers who had negative experiences with the drug.

The emergence of Web 2.0 brought about noteworthy changes in WOMM, with many web startups such as Facebook, YouTube, MySpace, and Digg incorporating buzz marketing into their platforms to leverage their social networks. This integration has amplified the power of word-of-mouth marketing, especially with the Internet serving as a primary research and communication platform. The Internet's role has simplified communication processes by eliminating barriers like distance and language, encouraging consumers to share their opinions readily and form communities, and sequentially strengthening word-of-mouth marketing.

In 2003, Fred Reichheld introduced the Net Promoter Score as a word-of-mouth marketing strategy, assessing the number of promoters recommending a brand to others. This tactic emphasizes the importance of positive customer experiences in driving organic word-of-mouth marketing.

In October 2005, the advertising watchdog group Commercial Alert petitioned the United States Federal Trade Commission (FTC) to issue guidelines for paid word-of-mouth marketers, requiring them to disclose their relationship and compensation from the company whose product they promote. The FTC responded by committing to investigate cases where such relationships are undisclosed and could impact endorsements, pledging to take enforcement actions as necessary, including cease-and-desist orders, fines, or civil penalties. The Word of Mouth Marketing Association, a prominent US trade group representing numerous companies, later adopted an ethics code prohibiting manufacturers from offering cash to consumers in exchange for recommendations or endorsements.

In 2008, PQ Media stated that companies spent $1.54 billion on word-of-mouth marketing, indicating a significant growth trend compared to traditional advertising channels. Within this, word-of-mouth marketing expenditure increased by 14.2% in 2008, with 30% allotted to food and drink brands.

In December 2014, the Journal of Advertising Research found that 75% of all consumer conversations about brands happen face-to-face with merely 15% happening over the phone and just 10% taking place online.

== Factors ==
According to the Journal of Consumer Psychology and Jonah Berger's book Contagious: Why Things Catch On, six key factors drive what people talk about and share. They are organized in an acronym called STEPPS, which stands for:

- Social currency - The better something makes people look, the more likely they will be to share it.
- Triggers - Things that are top of mind or easily accessible are more likely to be talked about and shared.
- Emotion - Strong emotions, especially high arousal emotions, increase the likelihood of sharing information.
- Public - The more visible or observable something is, the more likely it is to be imitated and shared.
- Practical value - People share information that is useful, practical, or valuable to others.
- Stories - Narratives or stories are powerful tools for conveying messages and ideas.

Additionally, as mentioned by Berger, interest plays an essential role in driving word-of-mouth communication. Andy Sernovitz supports this theory, stating that, "nobody talks about boring companies, boring products, or boring ads".

== Models ==
Study into developing the concept of word-of-mouth marketing led to the emergence of various models underlying the word-of-mouth strategy. These models include the organic inter-consumer influence model, the linear marketer influence model, and the network coproduction model.

=== Organic Inter-consumer Influence Model ===
The initial and most straightforward form of word-of-mouth marketing aligns with the Organic Inter-consumer Influence Model. In this model, organizations have no direct control over what consumers say about their products - it involves one consumer sharing their product reviews or customer service experiences with another. The primary motivation behind this model is for consumers to inform and caution potential buyers of a product out of genuine concern, not for personal gain. Termed "organic", this model occurs naturally when consumers choose to share their experiences with a specific brand or product.

=== Linear Marketer Influence Model ===
As research progressed, marketers recognized the importance of "influential consumers", leading to the adoption of the linear marketer influence model. This model introduced the idea of influential customers initiating conversations with potential buyers regarding how a product benefits the consumer. It enables organizations to ensure that credible sources advocate for their brand and accurately present the value proposition to the target consumer. This can be achieved through targeted advertisements and promotions via reputable sources that review the product. Marketers found this model effective in mitigating the spread of negative opinions and attitudes about their products.

=== Network Coproduction Model ===
The Network Coproduction Model introduced "one-to-one seeding and communication programs", encouraging customer conversations about specific products through released product information. This word-of-mouth model primarily focuses on online activities, utilizing platforms like blogs and online communities to convey product messages. The network coproduction model allows marketers to manage and control online word-of-mouth activities. Marketers use the network coproduction model to employ word-of-mouth marketing in several ways:

- Seeding - Exemplifies how marketers leverage the network coproduction model of word-of-mouth marketing, using indirect and direct approaches. Seeding campaigns enable marketers to reach new consumer segments effectively, particularly in the early stages of a product's lifecycle, establishing and enhancing brand and product reputation.
- Engineering - Marketers orchestrate conversations to generate buzz and increase WOM about an organization's products.
- Direct Seeding - Selecting consumers and allowing them to sample products that an organization has. This allows these selected customers to present their feelings towards these products through online communities or blogs.

== Techniques ==
=== Marketing buzz ===
Marketing buzz, also known simply as "buzz", refers to the phenomenon in word-of-mouth marketing where consumers and users of a product or service contribute to amplifying the original marketing message. It can be described as a form of positive hype, excitement, or anticipation surrounding a product or service among consumers. Achieving positive "buzz" is often a key goal of viral marketing, public relations efforts, and advertising campaigns on Web 2.0 platforms. This term encompasses both the strategic execution of marketing techniques and the resulting positive sentiment and goodwill generated.

Products that generated strong marketing buzz upon their introduction include Harry Potter, the Volkswagen New Beetle, Pokémon, Beanie Babies, and The Blair Witch Project. These products successfully leveraged various marketing strategies to create widespread excitement and positive associations among consumers, highlighting the power and impact of generating effective marketing buzz.

=== Viral effects ===
Viral marketing and viral advertising are buzzwords referring to marketing techniques that use pre-existing social networks to boost brand awareness or achieve marketing goals like increased product sales through self-replicating viral processes, analogous to the spread of a virus. These methods can be amplified by word-of-mouth or enhanced through Internet network effects. Viral campaigns can manifest as various content formats such as video clips, interactive games, ebooks, brandable software, images, or text messages. Successful viral marketing aims to target individuals with high social networking potential (SNP) and create compelling viral messages that resonate within this group. However, the term "viral marketing" also carries negative connotations, referring to deceptive practices like stealth marketing and astroturfing to simulate organic word-of-mouth enthusiasm.

== Analysis ==
Consumers promote brands through word-of-mouth based on social, functional, and emotional factors. The Journal of Marketing Research identified thirteen brand characteristics that stimulate WOM:

- Age of the brand in the marketplace, fostering emotional connections and reliability perceptions
- Type of good, influencing recommendations based on the product and different usage scenarios
- Complexity, explaining the product's usage or effectiveness
- Knowledge of a brand, including its history, purpose, and future success
- Differentiation among similar products, utilizing consumer experiences to aid decision-making
- Relevance of a brand to a broad audience
- Quality and esteem associated with a brand
- Premium offers, including special packaging and/or seasonal deals that stimulate WOM
- Visibility, enhancing brand recognition and recall
- Excitement for new products or innovations, driving anticipation and discussion
- Satisfaction levels, reflecting upon positive or negative experiences shared through WOM
- Perceived risks, cautioning against counterfeit products or deceptive marketing
- Involvement of consumers in brand experiences

While social and functional play a significant role in online WOM promotion, offline WOM is primarily driven by emotional factors.

== Advantages and disadvantages ==
=== Advantages ===
Word-of-mouth marketing plays a crucial role in amplifying the impact of an advertising campaign by effectively navigating consumers' defenses and encouraging discussions about a specific product. Marketers value WOMM for its ability to analyze personal networks, which are driven by genuine experiences rather than organizational motives.

One notable advantage of word-of-mouth marketing is its reliance on personal recommendations, fostering trust and authenticity in consumers' perceptions. Positive feedback from trusted sources boost consumers' willingness to try a product or service, enhancing overall campaign effectiveness.

=== Disadvantages ===
Word-of-mouth marketing is not favored by everyone, particularly in today's digital landscape. Online platforms allow not only positive but also negative reviews to spread rapidly, potentially undermining brand perception and consumer attitudes. Negative word-of-mouth can have a more significant impact on purchase intentions compared to positive feedback, highlighting the delicate balance in managing brand reputation.

Another issue arises when consumers perceive manipulation or hidden agendas behind word-of-mouth recommendations. Discovering that influencers have vested interests in promoting a product can lead to skepticism and negative shifts in attitude, ultimately affecting brand reputation negatively.

Similarly, engineered word-of-mouth campaigns by internet-focused companies face scrutiny for their perceived artificiality and invasion of privacy, further complicating the dynamics of consumer trust and perception in marketing strategies.

== See also ==
- Social media marketing
- Two-step flow of communication
- Evangelism marketing
- Guerrilla marketing
- User-generated content
- Online brand defense - A type of consumer behavior that has been considered creating significant impact on word-of-mouth
