= Advertising media selection =

Process of selecting the most efficient media of advertising

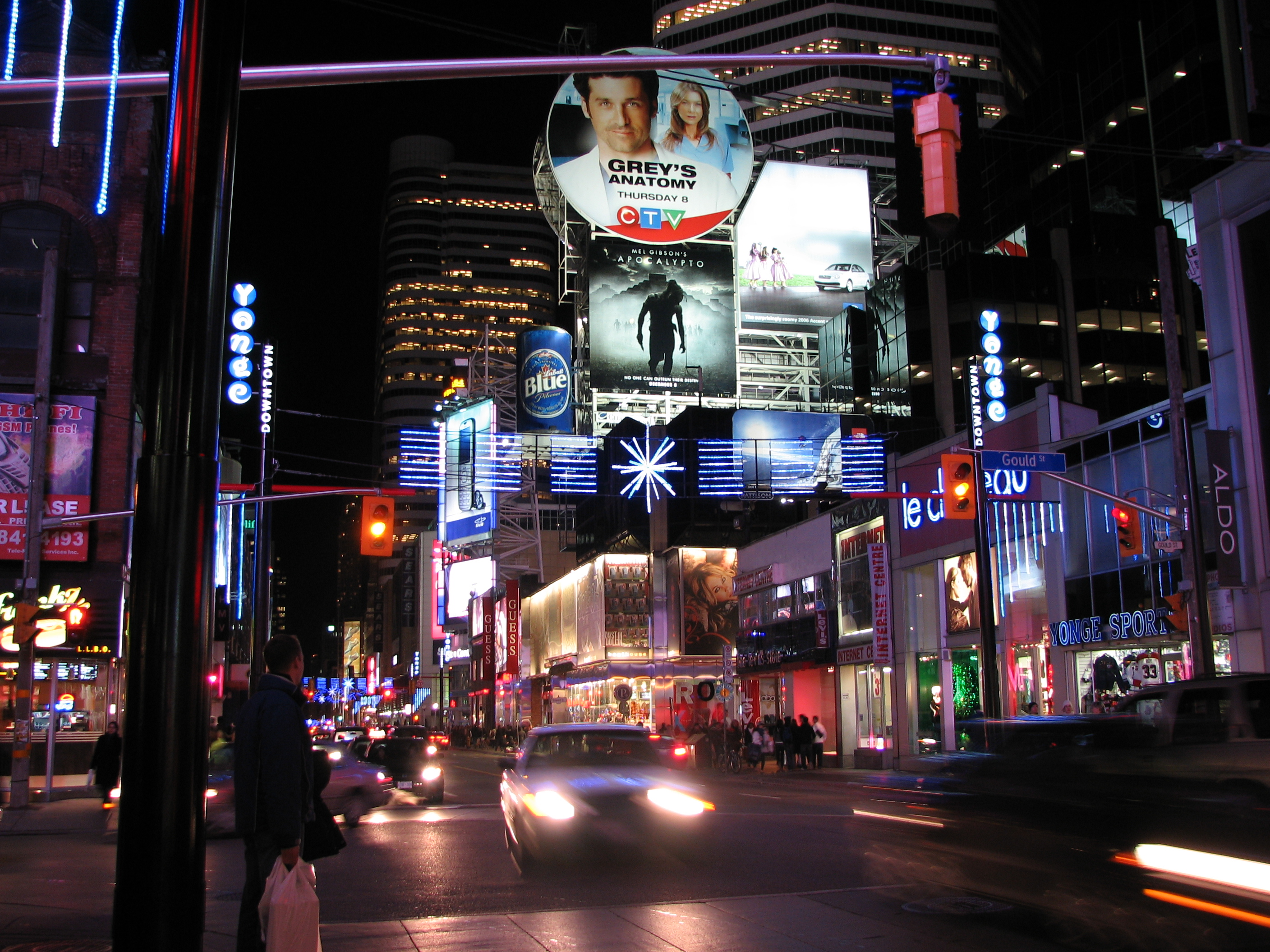
Advertising media often appear to be ubiquitous

Advertising media selection is the process of choosing the most efficient media for an advertising campaign. To evaluate media efficiency, planners consider a range of factors including: the required coverage and number of exposures in a target audience; the relative cost of the media advertising and the media environment. Media planning may also involve buying media space. Media planners require an intricate understanding of the strengths and weaknesses of each of the main media options. The media industry is dynamic - new advertising media options are constantly emerging. Digital and social media are changing the way that consumers use media and are also influencing how consumers acquire product information.

== Types of advertising media ==
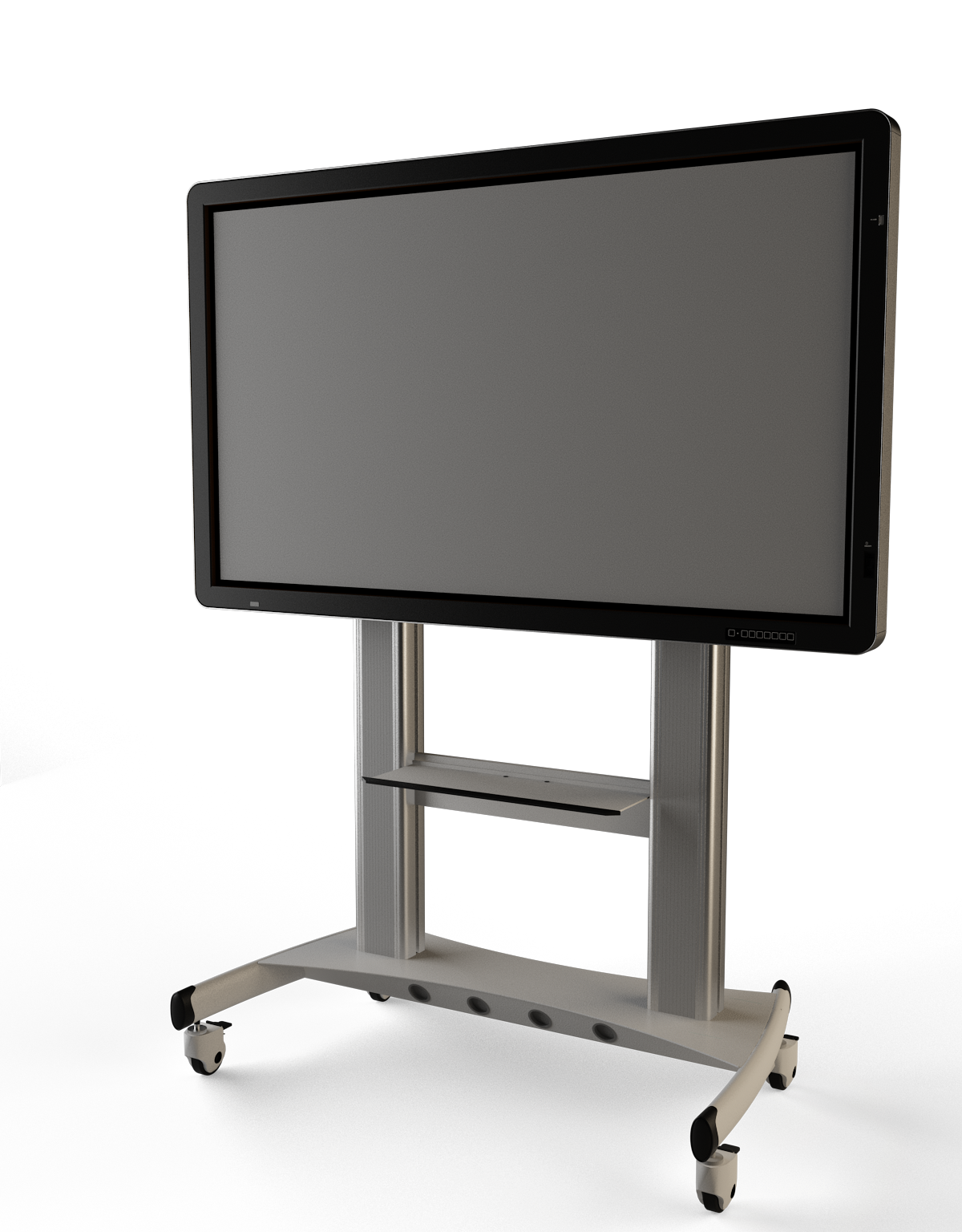
TV, once the mainstay of media advertising, is losing some of its gloss

The selection of advertising media for a given campaign requires a thorough understanding of the media options available.

=== Television advertising ===
Television advertising offers the benefit of reaching large numbers in a single exposure. The reason for having large numbers is that this advertising method can reach the household-level customers. Yet because it is a mass medium capable of being seen by nearly anyone, television lacks the ability to deliver an advertisement to highly targeted customers compared to other media outlets. Television networks are attempting to improve their targeting efforts. In particular, networks operating in the pay-to-access arena, such as those with channels on cable and satellite television, are introducing more narrowly themed programming (i.e., TV shows geared to specific interest groups) designed to appeal to selective audiences. However, television remains an option that is best for products that targeted to a broad market. The geographic scope of television advertising may vary, from local or regional advertising through to national coverage, depending on whether public broadcasting or subscriber-based cable services are used.

Television advertising, once seen as the mainstay of media advertising, is facing numerous challenges from alternative media, especially interactive and social media. Technological innovations, especially the advent of ad blocking and zapping, has eroded TV's immediacy and relevance for some audiences.

=== Radio advertising ===
Promotion through radio has been a viable advertising option for over 80 years. Radio advertising is mostly local to the broadcast range of a radio station, however, at least three options exist that offer national and potentially international coverage. First, in many countries there are radio networks that use many geographically distinct stations to broadcast simultaneously. In the United States such networks as Disney (children's programming) and ESPN (sports programming) broadcast nationally either through a group of company-owned stations or through a syndication arrangement (i.e., business agreement) with partner stations. Second, within the last few years the emergence of radio programming delivered via satellite has become an option for national advertising. Finally, the potential for national and international advertising may become more attractive as radio stations allow their signals to be broadcast over the Internet.

In many ways radio suffers the same problems as television, namely, a mass medium that is not highly targeted and offers little opportunity to track responses. But unlike television, radio presents the additional disadvantage of limiting advertisers to audio-only advertising. For some products advertising without visual support is not effective.

=== Print publications advertising ===
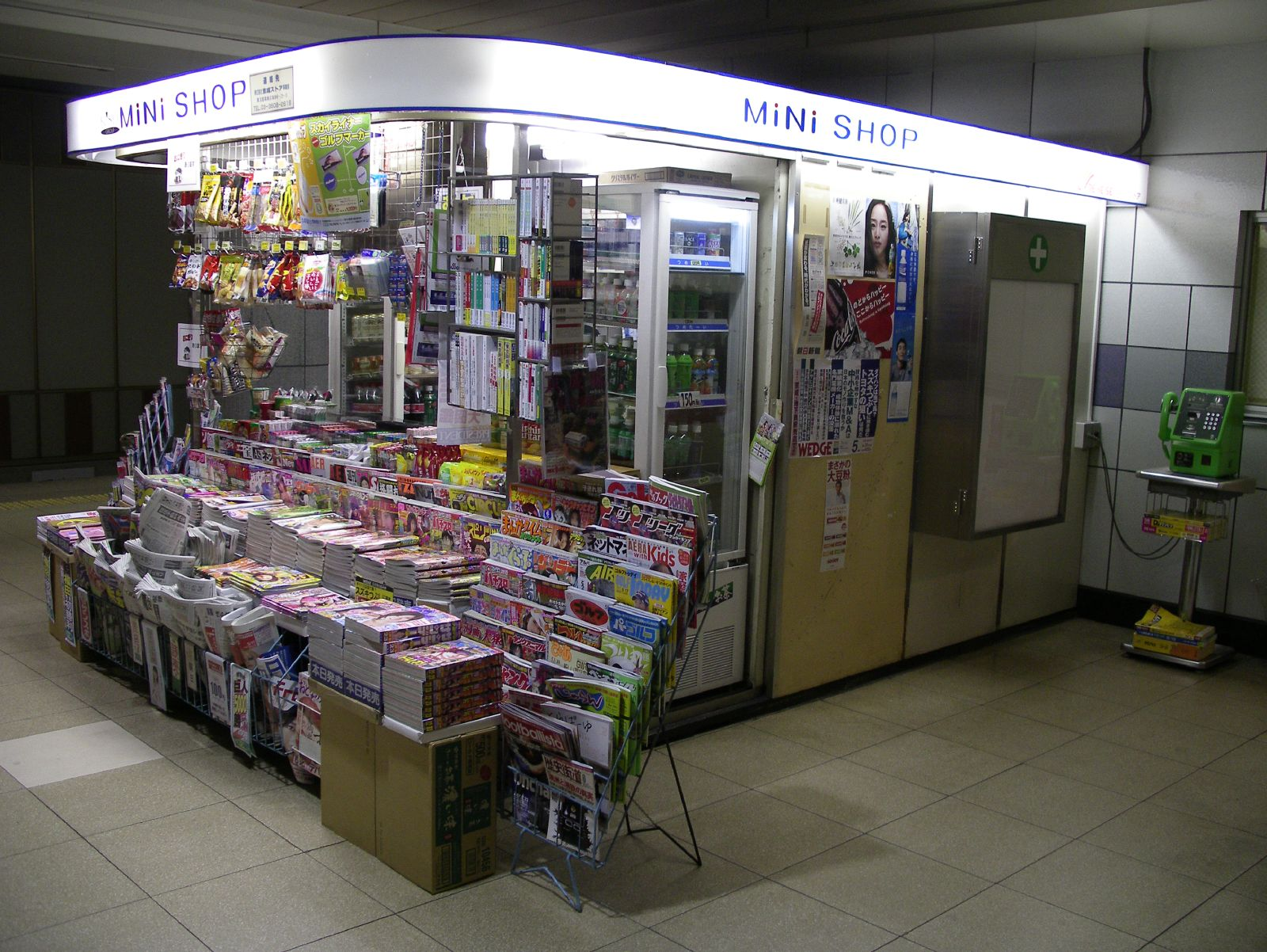
Print media continue to offer varied advertising opportunities

Print publications such as magazines, books, newspapers and Special Issue publications (such as annuals) offer a variety of advertising opportunities:

Magazines, especially those that target specific niche or specialized interest areas, are more tightly targeted compared to broadcast media. Additionally, magazines offer the option of allowing marketers to present their message using high quality imagery (e.g., full color) and can also offer advertisers the ability to integrate interactive, tactile experiences through the use of scratch-it papers impregnated with scents (e.g., perfume).

Newspapers have also incorporated color advertisements, though their main advantage rests with their ability to target local markets. For advertisers, the ability to insert catalogs or special promotional material into the newspaper is an advantage.

Special Issue publications can offer very selective targeting since these often focus on an extremely narrow topics (e.g., auto buying guide, tour guides, college and university ratings, etc.).

=== Internet advertising ===
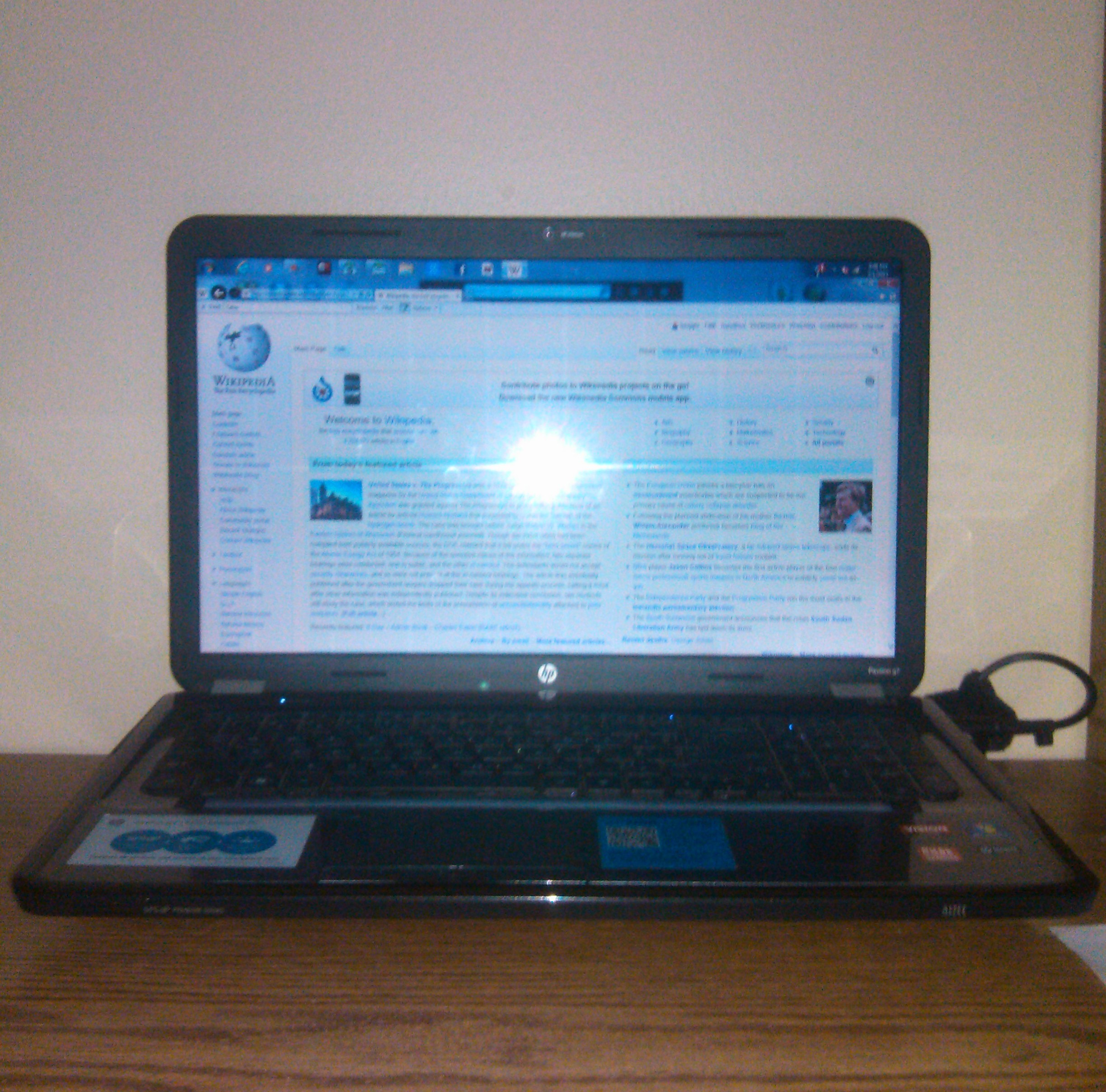
The Internet is the fastest growing advertising media

The fastest growing media outlet for advertising is the Internet. Compared to spending in other media, the rate of spending for Internet advertising is experiencing tremendous growth and in the U.S. trails only newspaper and television advertising in terms of total spending. Internet advertising's influence continues to expand and each year more major marketers shift a larger portion of their promotional budget to this medium. Two key reasons for this shift rest with the Internet's ability to: (1) narrowly target an advertising message and, (2) track user response to the advertiser's message.

The Internet offers many advertising options with messages delivered through websites or by email:

- Standard online advertising formats (e.g. Banner ads, interstitials.) - A banner ad is a rectangular advertisement appearing at the top or bottom of a web-page. Banner ads are typically 468 X 60 pixels. An interstitial is an advertisement that interrupts the user. It may be a full page or a pop up window.
- Rich media advertisements - ads that incorporate a variety of technology components such as video and audio. Rich media ads are thought to deliver higher impact messages.
- Paid search advertising - A method of placing online advertisements on web pages that show results from search engine queries. Through the same search-engine advertising services, ads can also be placed on Web pages with other published content.
- Search engine marketing - A form of Internet marketing that involves the promotion of websites by increasing their visibility in search engine results pages (SERPs) primarily through paid advertising. SEM may incorporate search engine optimization (SEO), which adjusts or rewrites website content and site architecture to achieve a higher ranking in search engine results pages to enhance pay per click (PPC) listings.
- Online video gaming - An online game is a video game that is either partially or primarily played through the Internet or another computer network. Advertisers can pay to have their messages or products incorporated into the sets of online games.
- Paid inclusion - Paid inclusion is a search engine marketing product where the search engine company charges fees related to inclusion of websites in their search index. The use of paid inclusion is controversial and paid inclusion's popularity has decreased over time among search engines.
- Email advertising - also known as internet direct marketing. Using email to deliver an advertisement affords marketers the advantage of low distribution cost and potentially high reach. In situations where the marketer possesses a highly targeted list, response rates to email advertisements may be quite high. This is especially true if those on the list have agreed to receive email, a process known as “opt-in” marketing. Email advertisement can take the form of a regular email message or be presented within the context of more detailed content, such as an electronic newsletter. Delivery to a user's email address can be viewed as either plain text or can look more like a website using web coding (i.e., HTML). However, as most people are aware, there is significant downside to email advertising due to highly publicized issues related to abuse (i.e., spam).
- Social media advertising - forms of online advertising that focus on social networking services such as Facebook, Twitter, and Instagram.

Online advertising has spawned a range of new segmentation and targeting approaches including Affinity targeting, Behavioral targeting, Contextual targeting and Geographic targeting and Purchase-based category targeting.

=== Out-of-home media ===
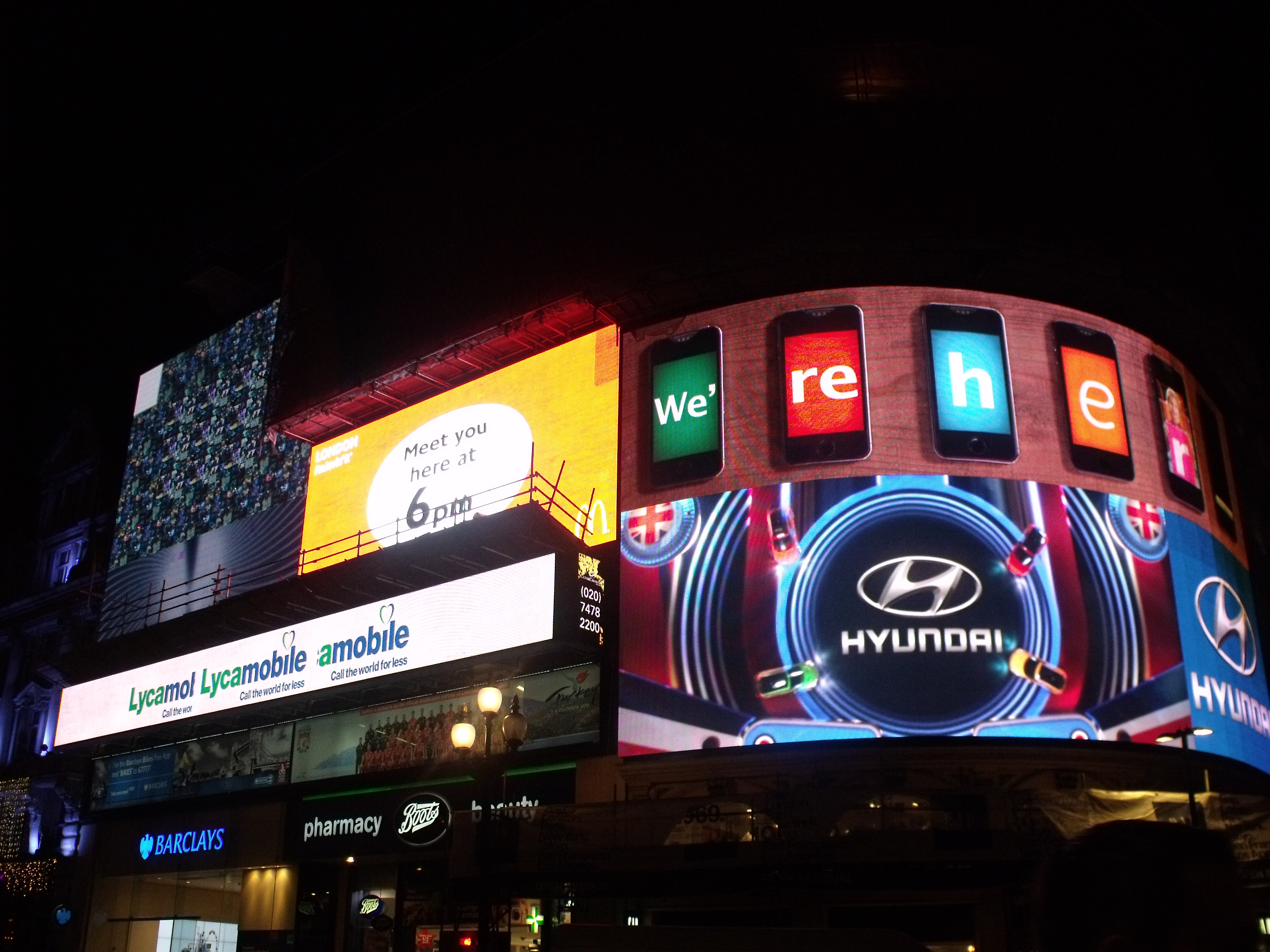
Piccadilly Circus, London is lit up with multiple out-of-home messages)

The use of signs to communicate a marketer's message places advertising in geographically identified areas in order to capture customer attention. The most obvious method of using signs is through billboards, which are generally located in high traffic areas. Outdoor billboards come in many sizes, though the most well-known are large structures located near transportation points intending to attract the interest of people traveling on roads or public transportation. Indoor billboards are often smaller than outdoor billboards and are designed to attract the attention of foot traffic (i.e., those moving past the sign). For example, smaller signage in airports, train terminals and large commercial office space fit this category.

While billboards are the most obvious example of signage advertising, there are many other forms of signage advertising include:

- Sky writing where airplanes use special chemicals to form words
- Messages placed on hot air balloons or banners carried by small aircraft
- Mobile billboards where signs are placed on vehicles, such as buses and cars, taxis or even clapper-boards carried by paid agents
- Plastic bags used to protect newspapers delivered to homes
- Advertisements attached to grocery carts
- Holographic images projected into public spaces
- Laser projections onto city buildings

=== Mobile device advertising ===
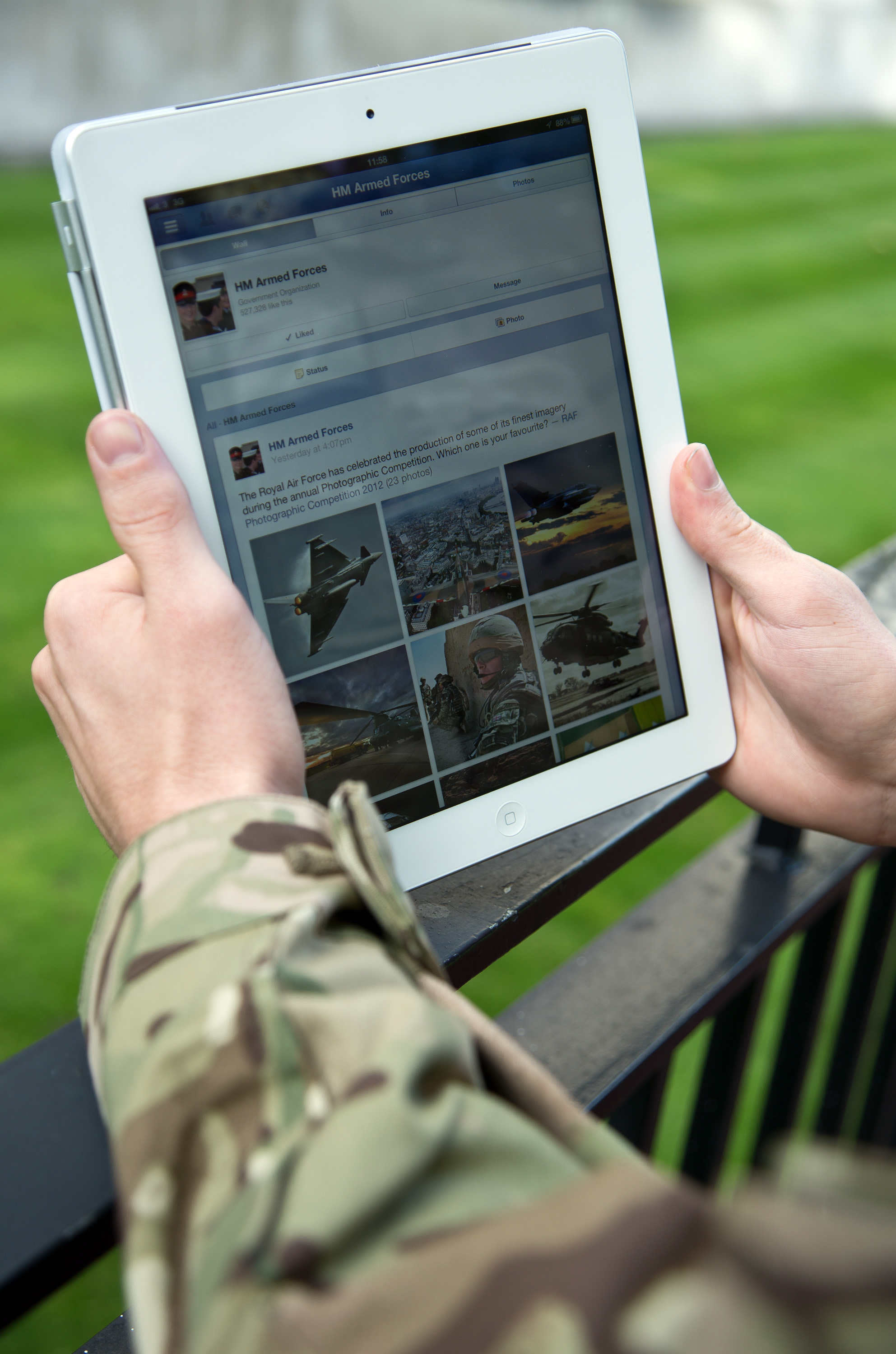
The growth of hand-held devices is changing the way that consumers consume media and search for product information'

Handheld devices, such as cellphones, smartphones, portable computers and other wireless devices, make up most of the growing mobile device market. Such devices allow customers to stay informed, gather information and communicate with others without being tied to a physical location. While the mobile device market is only beginning to become a viable advertising medium, it may soon offer significant opportunity for marketers to reach customers at any time and anywhere.

Also, with geographic positioning features included in newer mobile devices, the medium has the potential to provide marketers with the ability to target customers based on their geographic location. Currently, the most popular advertising delivery method to mobile devices is through plain text messaging, however, over the next few years multimedia advertisements are expected to become the dominant message format.

Word of Mouth Promotion of products can also happen through verbal communication between people.

== Audience research ==
Selecting the optimal media vehicles for a given campaign requires detailed research and analysis. Media planners need to match their target market with media audiences. Identifying the audience for a magazine or newspaper, or determining who watches television at a given time, is a specialized form of market research, often conducted on behalf of media owners.

Measures of media audience that are of interest to advertisers include:

Print Media

- Circulation: the number of copies of an issue sold (independently assessed via a circulation audit)
- Readership: the total number of people who have seen or looked into a current edition of the a publication (independently measured via survey)
- Readership profiles: Demographic/ psychographic and behavioural analysis of readership (sourced from Readership surveys)

Broadcast Media

- Average audience: The average number of people who tuned into the given time or given program, expressed in thousands or as a percentage. Also known as a Rating or T.A.R.P (Total Audience Rating Point).
- Audience share: The number of listeners (or viewers) for a given channel over a given time period, expressed as a percentage of the total audience potential for the total market. (The audience share is normally calculated by dividing a given channel's average audience by the average audience of all channels).
- Audience potential: The total number of people in a given geographical area who conform to a specific definition, such as the number of people with a television (or radio) set or the total number of people aged 6–12 years. Population potentials are normally derived from the census figures and are used to estimate the potential market reach.
- Audience movement by session: The number of listeners (or viewers) who switch channels during a given time period.
- Audience profile: Analysis of audience by selected demographic, psychographic or behavioural variables.
- Cumulative audience (CUME): The number of different listeners (or viewers) in a given time period; also known as reach.
- People Using Television (PUT): The number of people (or households) tuned to any channel during a given time period.

Out-of-home media

- Opportunities to see (OTS) - a crude measure of the number of people who were exposed to the medium, For example, the number of cars that drive past an outdoor billboard in a given time period

Internet and digital media

- Site traffic: The number of visitors to a website within a given time period (e.g. a month)
- Unique visitors: The number of different visitors to a website within a given time period
- Site stickiness: The average length of time a person remains on a page (a measure of audience engagement)
- Average page views per visit: The number of different pages generated by a visitor to a site (a measure of engagement)
- Click through rate (CTR): The number of people who clicked on an advertisement or advertising link
- Cost per click (CPS): The average cost of generating one click through
- Rate of return visitors: The number of unique visitors who return to a site
- Bounce rate: Number of site visitors who leave the site within a predetermined time (seconds)

Although much of the audience research data is normally only available to subscribers and prospective advertisers, basic information is published for the general public, often as topline survey findings. The type and depth of freely available information varies across geographic markets. Audience research for broadcast media is provided to prospective advertisers via the networks or via a media buying group. A limited amount of basic audience data is available to the general public through statutory authorities or media organisations.

Links to Wikipedia Articles About Organisations that May Provide Sources of Broadcast Audience Data ( Main English speaking markets)
Country	Radio	Television
Australia	GfK for Commercial Radio Australia	OzTAM and Regional TAM
Britain	RAJAR	Broadcasters' Audience Research Board
Canada	Numeris	Numeris
New Zealand	GfK for the Radio Broadcasters Association	Sky TV, TVNZ and TVWorks
United States	Nielsen Audio	Nielsen

- Notes: Also see Nielsen Media, for Trends in Canadian TV Viewing

== Advertising media scheduling ==
Scheduling refers to the pattern of advertising timing, represented as plots on a calendar-type flowchart (as shown in the figure), typically for one year, but may be for a specific campaign of shorter duration. A media schedule typically contains specific detail including the media channels used, ... specifies insertion or broadcast dates, positions, and duration of the messages." These plots indicate the pattern of scheduled times advertising must appear to coincide with favorable selling periods. The classic scheduling models are: Blitzing; Continuity, Flighting and Pulsing.

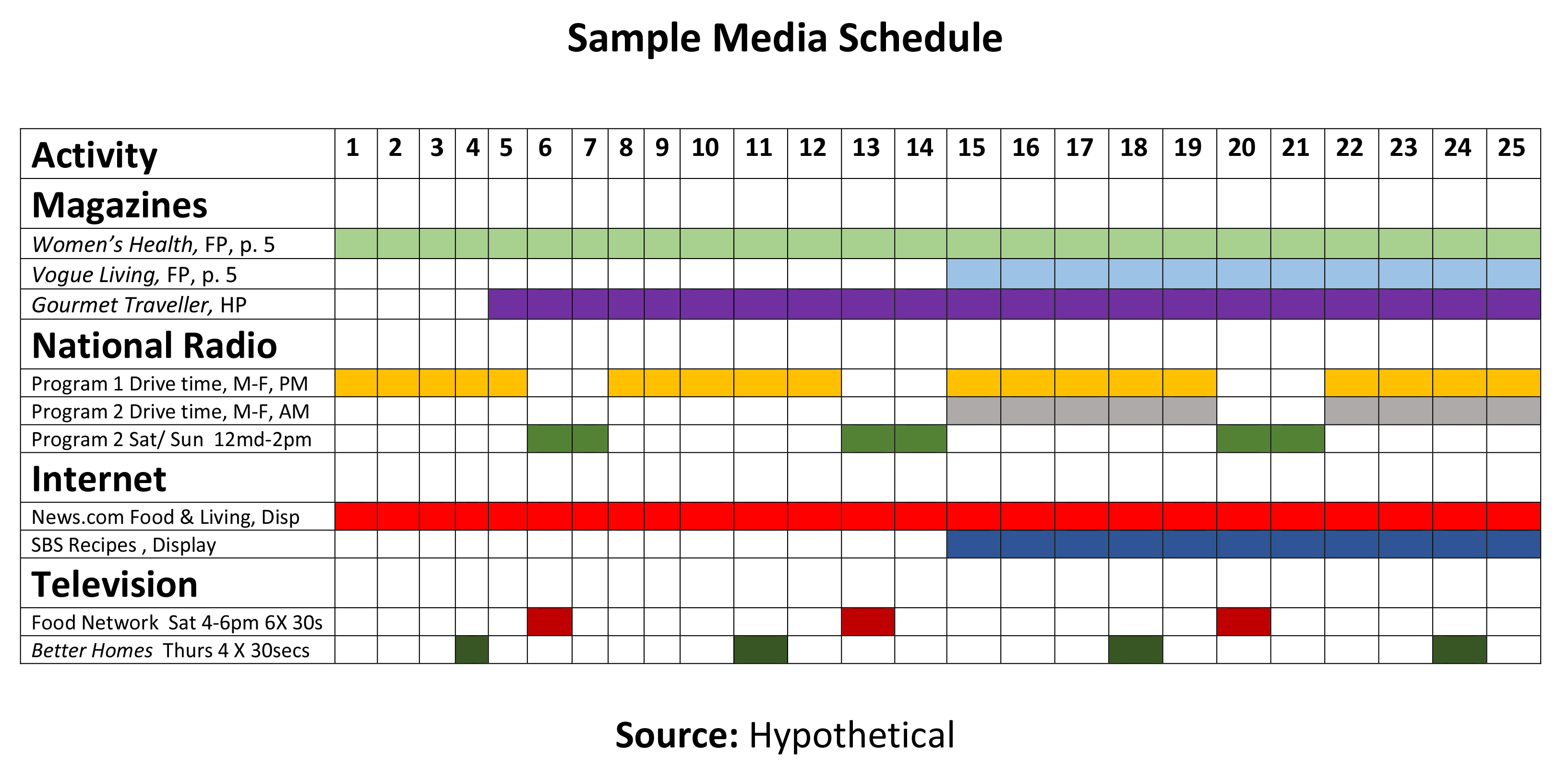
The media schedule includes specific detail such as dates, media, position, placement

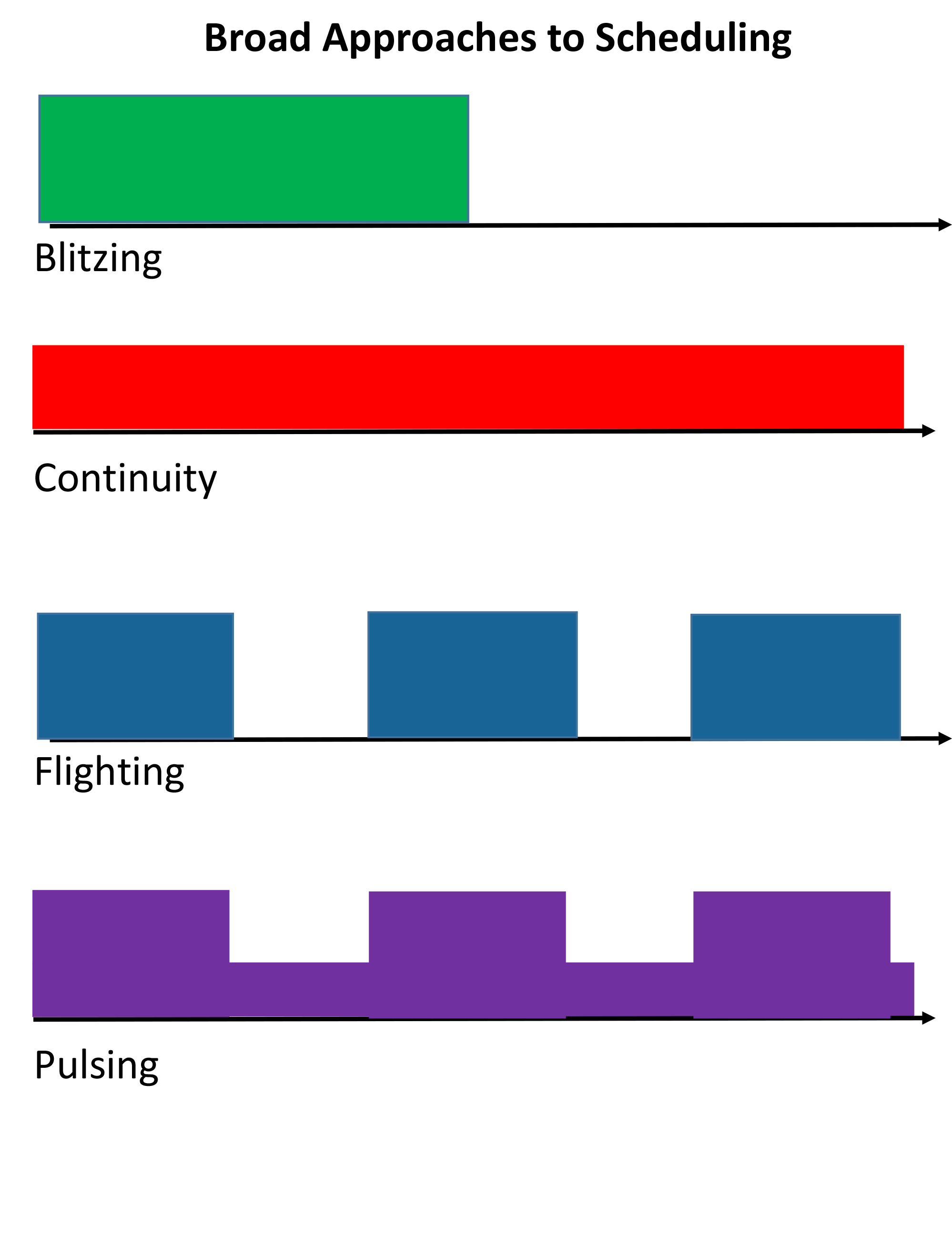
Blitzing, continuity, flighting and pulsing are the main schedule patterns

A major consideration in constructing media schedules is timing. The advertiser's main aim should be to place the advertisement as close as practical to the point where consumers make their purchase decision. For example, an advertiser who knows that a grocery buyer does a main shop on Saturday afternoons and a top-up shop on Wednesday nights, may consider using radio spots to reach the shopper while he or she is driving to the supermarket.

The broad approaches to scheduling are:

Blitzing

Blitzing consists of one concentrated burst of advertising normally during the initial period of the planning horizon. Blitzing is more likely to be used by new products attempting to penetrate the market or by dominant brands in competitive markets.

Continuity

Continuity is a pattern of relatively constant levels throughout a given time period or campaign. This approach is primarily for staple, perishable products (i.e. non-seasonal products). Advertising runs steadily with little variation over the campaign period. There may be short gaps at regular intervals and also long gaps—for instance, one ad every week for 52 weeks, and then a pause. This pattern of advertising is prevalent in service and packaged goods that require continuous reinforcement on the audience for top of mind recollection at point of purchase. Advantages:

- Works as a reminder
- Covers the entire purchase cycle
- Cost efficiencies in the form of large media discounts
- Positioning advantages within media

Program or plan that identifies the media channels used in an advertising campaign, and specifies insertion or broadcast dates, positions, and duration of the messages.

Flighting (or "bursting")

In media scheduling for seasonal product categories, flighting involves intermittent and irregular periods of advertising (flights), alternating with shorter periods (hiatuses) of no advertising at all. The main advantage of the flighting technique is that it allows an advertiser who does not have funds for running spots continuously to conserve money and maximize the effect of the commercials by airing them at key strategic times. Advertisers may employ less costly media such as radio or newspaper during a television flighting hiatus. This method of media planning allows the messages and themes of the advertising campaign to continue to reach consumers while conserving advertising funds.

Advantages:

- Advertisers buy heavier weight than competitors for a relatively shorter period of time
- Little waste, since advertising concentrates on the best purchasing cycle period
- Series of commercials appear as a unified campaign on different media vehicles

Pulsing

Pulsing combines flighting and continuous scheduling by using a low levels advertising of continuous advertising, followed by intermittent bursts of more intense advertising at predetermined times such as holidays, peak seasons. Product categories that are sold year round but experience a surge in sales at intermittent periods are good candidates for pulsing. For instance, under-arm deodorants, sell all year, but more in summer months. Pulsing is also used by market challengers who want to create an impression of a larger advertising budget.

Empirical support for the effectiveness of pulsing is relatively weak. However, research suggests that continuous schedules and flighted schedules generally result in strong levels of consumer recall.

Advantages:

- Useful for use with seasonal products e.g. travel or products sold intermittently e.g.heating and cooling systems
- Can be used by market challengers to give the impression of a higher share of voice
- Combined the advantages of both continuity and flighting possible
- Is a less expensive option than a continuous schedule

=== Media buying ===
Also see Media buying

While some advertisers prefer to purchase advertising spots by dealing directly with media owners (e.g. newspapers, magazines or broadcast networks), in practice most media buying is purchased as part of broader negotiations via a media buying agency or media buying group. Well-known centralised buying groups include Zenith or Optimedia. These large media agencies are able to exert market power through volume purchasing by buying up space for an entire year. Media agencies benefit advertisers by providing advertising units at lower rates and also through the provision of added value services such as media planning services.

Most media outlets use dynamic pricing, a form of yield management which means that there are no fixed rates. Prices depend on a number of factors including - the advertiser's prior relationship with the network, the volume of inventory being purchased, the timing of the booking and whether the advertiser is using cross-media promotions such as product placements. Advertising spots purchased closer to air-time tend to be more expensive.

Buying advertising spots on national TV is very expensive. Given that most media outlets use dynamic pricing, rates vary from day to day, creating difficulties locating indicative rates. However, from time to time, trade magazines publish adrates which may be used as a general guide. The following table provides indicative advertising rates for selected popular programs on American national television networks, broadcast during prime time viewing hours.

Advertising rates, selected US TV programs, 2010
Program/ Network	Network	Broadcast Day / Time	Rate (per 30 second spot)
American Idol *	Fox	Day not stated, prime-time	$360,000 - $490,000
Sunday Night Football	NBC	Sunday, prime-time	$435,000
Family Guy	Fox	Sunday, prime-time	$215,000
Saturday Night College Football	ABC	Saturday, prime-time	$140,000
Survivor	CBS	Thursday, prime-time	$152,000
The Biggest Loser	NBC	Tuesday, prime-time	$128,000
Jay Leno **	NBC	Mon-Fri, Late-night	$48,800 - $65,000

Notes:

* Rates for programs such as American Idol increase as the program moves closer to finals
** Rates for Mon-Fri programs such as Jay Leno vary depending on the day of the week and the expected audience size

== See also ==
- Advertising
- Advertising campaign
- Advertising management
- Advertising research
- AIDA
- Ad tracking
- Brand awareness
- Consumer behaviour
- DAGMAR
- Frequency (marketing)
- Integrated marketing communications
- Marketing communications
- Media planning
- Mass media
- New media
- Promotion
- Promotional mix
- Reach (advertising)
