= Ameritest =

Advertising company

- Type: Private
- Industry: Marketing Research
- Founded: 1990
- Headquarters: United States
- Area served: 18 countries
- Key people: Charles E. Young (Founder)
- Website: www.ameritest.net

Ameritest is an international advertising research firm, headquartered in Albuquerque, New Mexico, which provides its clients with worldwide market research on their advertising concepts, and executions.

The company was founded in 1990 in Chicago, Illinois by Charles E. Young. Ameritest, d.b.a. CY Research, uses highly visual or non-verbal approaches to measuring advertising in various media, including television, print, direct response, packaging, internet and branded entertainment.

== Heuristic Models ==
The primary tools used by the company to illustrate how advertising works are heuristic models created by Young. The purpose of these models is to focus on learning how and why an ad is, or is not, working to improve or optimize work performance. The models are organized into a hierarchy that attempts to bridge the divide between report card systems and diagnostic systems.

As a pre-testing, or copy testing system, Ameritest’s television model is intended to explain how the audience perceives motion media including television, online, film, and other forms of branded entertainment. The print model addresses print media including newspaper, magazines, Direct Response, catalog, and outdoor advertising.

== Awards ==
Ameritest is the winner of six David Ogilvy Research Awards including the Grand Award for its work with IBM’s “Blue Letterbox” ad campaign.

- David Ogilvy Research Award, Grand Ogilvy Award, "IBM Infrastructure Campaign", 2003
- David Ogilvy Research Award, Gold Medallion, Best In "Considered Purchase" Category, 2003.
- David Ogilvy Research Award, Silver Medallion, E-Business Campaign, 2000, Pre-testing.
- David Ogilvy Research Award, Silver Medallion, "Shaping Strategy", Unilever HRC, USA, Helene Curtis Business Unit, Degree/Competitive Research, 1998.
- David Ogilvy Research Award, Silver Medallion, 1997, Personal Products: Just My Size/ "Talking Fit" campaign, Pre-testing.
- David Ogilvy Research Award, Silver Medallion, 1996, "L'eggs "Smooth Silhouettes" Pre-testing.

== Articles ==
Articles written about Ameritest

Delivering the Message, (American Chamber of Commerce Journal) ACCJ Journal, November 2004, 35 PDF

ESOMAR Conference

ESOMAR Conference Presentation One Size Fits All

Creativity Magazine, October 1, 2003 “Testing on Trial: Is copytesting killing advertising creativity?”

Articles written by Ameritest

Harvard Business Review article, The Spielberg Variables, April 1, 2005, p 16

Article "Brain Waves, Picture Sorts and Branding Moments" Journal of Advertising Research, July/Aug 2002 issue, Volume 2, No. 4, pp 42-53 and cover. (you must be a member and search for the title) and WARC, Journal of Advertising Research Scroll down to Brain Waves, Picture Sorts and Branding Moments.

Admap magazine, Emotions in TV Ads, January 2004, Issue 446, pp 34–36, Scroll down to Emotion in TV Ads paper

Admap magazine, Does Day-After Recall Produce Vanilla Ads? June 2004, Issue 451, pp 40–42.

Editorials regarding Ameritest

Advertising Age, May 9, 2005, page 32, Viewpoint section, Letters to the Editor, "Agencies should be more involved with research" article, written by Charles E. Young, CEO and founder of Ameritest. Advertising Age Archives

Advertising Age, June 9, 2003, page 24, Viewpoint section, “The danger in ad recall tests”, by John Kastenholz and Charles Young. Advertising Age Archives

Advertising Age, June 9, 2003, page 6, “Copy tests under fire from new set of critics”, mentions us through a quote by Kastenholz. Advertising Age Archives

Advertising Age, Viewpoint section, Editorial, July 14, 2003, page 15. “Effective ads work in more than one way”, by Chuck. A rebuttal to the original article “copy tests under fire”

Conferences Ameritest has Participated in

ESOMAR Conference

ESOMAR Conference Presentation One Size Fits All

“ReThink” the 51st annual ARF conference & expo, 2005. Monday, April 18, Forum 3, 10:15—11:45, Semantic Network Analysis of Brand Ratings: A beverage case study, Charles E. Young. Conference was held at the Embassy Suites Hotel, New York City April 17–19, 2005.

“Consumer Engagement Conference: How to turn on a mind”, September 28–29, 2006 (The ARF) “Measuring the Turn On” a panel discussion with Amy Shea Hall of Ameritest. PDF
