= Advertising Checking Bureau =

The Advertising Checking Bureau, Inc.
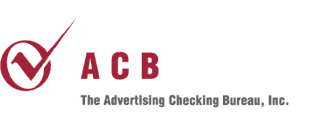
- Industry: marketing
- Founded: 1917 in New York City
- Founder: Walter B. Katzenberger
- Headquarters: New York City
- Website: www.acbcoop.com

The Advertising Checking Bureau, Inc. (ACB) is a company that develops, manages and administers local channel marketing programs for manufacturers and their retailers. ACB developed the first services specializing in auditing co-operative (Co-op) advertising invoices to determine the actual rates paid by retailers in daily newspapers in the early 1950s.

ACB services include the management of co-op advertising programs for manufacturers, competitive ad tracking services and administration of sales incentive programs.

ACB is a privately held company headquartered in New York City, with production offices in Memphis, TN and Tempe, AZ.

== History ==
The Advertising Checking Bureau was founded in 1917 in New York City by Walter B. Katzenberger. Katzenberger was an Account Executive with a major advertising agency managing the 20 Mule Team Borax account. Tearsheets (ad copies) from complete newspapers were sent by the individual publishers to the agencies as proof that the advertising ran as scheduled. This proof of performance (tearsheet) was required for agencies to pay the advertising invoices.

The company established offices in Chicago, Memphis (1948) and Tempe (1983). ACB expanded its core services from Competitive Ad Tracking and Co-op Management, into Incentive programs with rebate and spiff processing in 1999.

ACB's first research project was ordered in 1929 by the Colgate-Palmolive-Peet Company. Colgate contracted with ACB to read all newspapers available and pull tearsheets for every retail grocery ad. This Colgate study pioneered Co-operative advertising offerings by leading soap companies. By the mid 1930s, ACB provided Colgate, Lever Bros. and Procter & Gamble with reports on retail newspaper advertising. These reports provided verification for manufacturers to pay the retailers whose advertising met the guidelines of the Co-operative advertising programs.

The first computers were installed at ACB offices in 1937 in both New York and Chicago. During World War II, the U.S. Government contacted all firms who owned computer equipment and were not involved in war initiatives to donate this equipment. ACB provided the computers to the government and received a commendation.

During the war years of 1940-1945, requests for newspaper advertising tearsheets were received from the U.S. government. ACB prepared reports of all newspaper advertising that promoted War Bonds and other Government drives in effect at the time. These services must have proven valuable to the government's war efforts, and ACB was acknowledged with an Army-Navy "E" Award for Excellence - an award usually given to companies in the defense industry.

Playtex Girdle contemplated a co-operative advertising program and hired ACB to compile a retail newspaper advertising report of their own and competitive foundation garments. Around 1951, the Federal Trade Commission (FTC) investigated the corset and brassiere industry due to widespread abuses and illegalities in this industry. The FTC organized an industry meeting and imposed harsh regulations against these abuses. Subsequently, the industry requested that ACB audit Co-op advertising claims for all manufacturers in the corset and brassiere industry.

== Ownership ==
The Advertising Checking Bureau was privately held by Walter Katzenberger and willed on to his wife, Helen, at the time of his death in 1969. Helen Katzenberger passed ownership of the company on to the Katzenberger Foundation upon her death years later. The Katzenberger Foundation sold to an Employee Stock Ownership Plan (ESOP) in 1985. The ESOP was purchased by management in 2008.
