= Gabe Aul =

American executive (born 1972)

Gabriel J. Aul
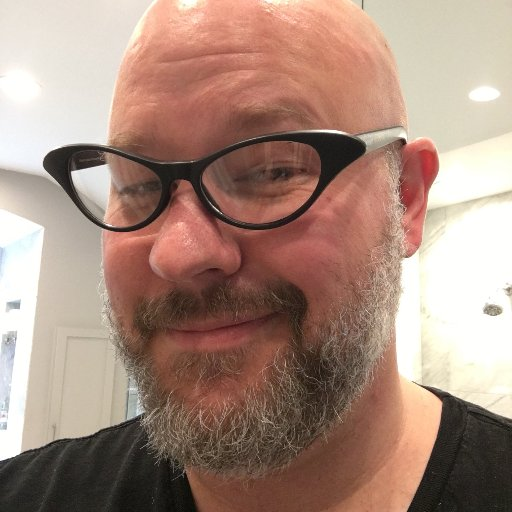
- Gabriel J. Aul in 2017
- Born: Gabriel J. Aul; 5 August 1972 (age 54); Aspen, Colorado
- Occupations: Corporate Vice President of WDG, Engineering Systems team at Microsoft (2015-2019); Head of Metaverse PG at Meta (2019-present)
- Employers: Microsoft (1992-2019); Meta (2019-present)
- Spouse: Elizabeth "Liz" Aul (m)
- Children: 3
- Website: https://tech.facebook.com/reality-labs/

Gabriel J. "Gabe" Aul, (born August 5, 1972) is an American technology executive. He was head of the Metaverse PG at Meta and earlier the Vice President of Oculus. He was previously the Corporate Vice President (CVP) of Windows & Devices Group (WDG), Engineering Systems (1ES) team at Microsoft. He was appointed as VP on 31 July 2015, following the launch of Windows 10 on 29 July 2015. He led the Windows Insider Program until June 1, 2016, where he was succeeded by Dona Sarkar.

== Career ==
Aul started Microsoft's Security Response team for Internet Explorer in 1996. Aul was later part of a team that started Microsoft's Sustained Engineering group in Windows, responsible for delivering hotfixes and service packs to customers.

Aul led the effort to build Microsoft's first product telemetry systems. Before then, Microsoft had no idea about how many problems were occurring on customer systems, nor were they able to debug them. Aul led part of the team creating the technologies to allow upload of crash, hang, and other failure data (Windows Error Reporting) as well as Microsoft's anonymous data collection system for usage data (Customer Experience Improvement Program.) Aul won several engineering awards, patents, and published a paper based on this work.

After Windows Vista, Aul started the Program Management team working on Performance for Windows, with Michael Fortin who led the Development team. Aul and his team spent 3 years working on Windows 7, the first edition of Windows ever that used less resources (memory, CPU, disk) than its predecessor.

Aul was promoted to Director and expanded his team to include reliability and security, and for Windows 8 they bested Windows 7 on those dimensions. For Windows 10; Aul was running an even further expanded team (adding Data Science to his other “Fundamentals” role) and was able to lead the effort to enable Flighting and Feedback for Microsoft's "Windows as a Service" strategy. As part of that, Aul started the Windows Insider Program and got to be the face of the effort for a while.

Gabriel stepped down from his role of running the Windows Insider Program on 1 June 2016, citing that he couldn't "give 100%" to both the Insider Program and his other job on the Engineering Systems Team at once. On September 8, 2017, Gabriel Aul celebrated his 25th anniversary working at Microsoft.

In 2019, Gabe Aul has left Microsoft for Facebook's Oculus team (now Meta Reality Labs). At Meta Gabriel Aul is responsible for scaling and integrating Meta Horizon platform which is part of Meta's larger metaverse strategy. In October 2025 he was promoted to lead the entire Metaverse Product Group. In June 2026, it was reported that Aul quietly left this position in February 2026.

== Patents ==
1. Method and system for downloading updates for software installation - Filed: September 16, 1999 | Issued: December 10, 2002
2. Method and system for an incidental feedback platform - Filed: April 22, 2005 | Issued: June 24, 2008
3. Device emulation to facilitate data transfer - Filed: March 9, 2006 | Issued: January 10, 2012
