= Communicus =

- Company type: Private
- Industry: Marketing Research
- Founded: 1992
- Headquarters: Tucson, Ariz.
- Key people: Jeri Smith (President)
- Website: www.Communicus.com

Communicus is an international advertising research firm that has contributed significantly to the field of advertising, and to the body of learning about advertising. Through its use of the longitudinal design for advertising research, the company produces evidence that advertising does, in fact, work and that its impact can be measured.

== Longitudinal design ==
While the longitudinal design has long been used in the scientific community as a way of overcoming the problems inherent in cross-sectional or matched sample studies, Communicus has pioneered its use in the field of advertising research. The design allows researchers to study a targeted population and identify the changes that advertising produces among those with proved awareness of the advertising as compared to the changes that occur among those who are not aware of the advertising.

For the analysis to be successful, the researcher must be able to accurately divide the longitudinal panel into those who have seen the advertising in-market versus those who have not. The methods used by Communicus to determine prior advertising awareness were originally developed based on experimental work done by the Advertising Research Foundation in the PARM studies and were later expanded by a consortium of advertisers organized by Seymour Smith and Associates that included AT&T, DuPont and Coca-Cola. The measurement technique involves limited recognition cues that access one's long-term memory. The cues are matched to the way memories for that particular medium are stored— for example, cues that trigger one’s episodic memory are used to access memories of TV commercials, while visual cues are used to access memories of magazine ads.

The results of these studies can be used by the advertiser to estimate the Return on Investment (ROI) generated by the advertising, and to make changes to the campaign that are designed to improve future effectiveness and ROI.

== Communicus Case Studies ==
BMW Case Study
Fallon, Pat, and Senn, Fred. Juicing the Orange: How to Turn Creativity into a Powerful Business Advantage. Boston: Pat Fallon and Fred Senn, 2006: p. 139.
Chevron Case Studies
Winters, Lewis C. “Does it Pay to Advertise to Hostile Audiences with Corporate Advertising?” Journal of Advertising Research. June/July 1988.
Rydholm, Joseph. “Campaigning for the outdoors.” Quirk’s Market Research Review. March 2000.
