= Online brand defense =

Concept in consumer behavior

Online brand defense is a concept in consumer behavior. It refers to the situation where a consumer defends a brand against criticisms on online platforms. The reason why a consumer does this varies. It might be due to attachment to the brand. It could also be due to belief in the brand's high product quality leading to the perception that the criticisms are unjustified.

Since the early 21st century, the concept of online brand defense has drawn scholarly interest within the field of marketing, in particular consumer psychology. Many experts in this field have been discussing ways to induce online brand defense in one's customers, because such behavior is thought to help defend the brand against negative word-of-mouth.

== Examples ==
- Former Democratic Party Hong Kong chairperson Emily Lau once openly complained Cathay Pacific, stating there was no beef in the beef porridge served. Owing to Lau's political stance, she was attacked by some internet users who disliked her.
- Lisa Ch'ng once openly complained about the services of Cathay Pacific, along with breaching the privacy of cabin crew. Hong Kong Airlines (a main rival of Cathay Pacific) implicitly mentioned the incident on social media, which triggered the attack from Matt Yeung, the boyfriend of Lisa Ch'ng. In turn, both were criticized heavily by many internet users. Some users criticized Yeung for being arrogant solely by appealing to Chinese nationalism and patriotism.

== See also ==
- Brand relationship
- Quality management
- Word-of-mouth marketing
