= Dona Sarkar =

Software engineer, author, public speaker

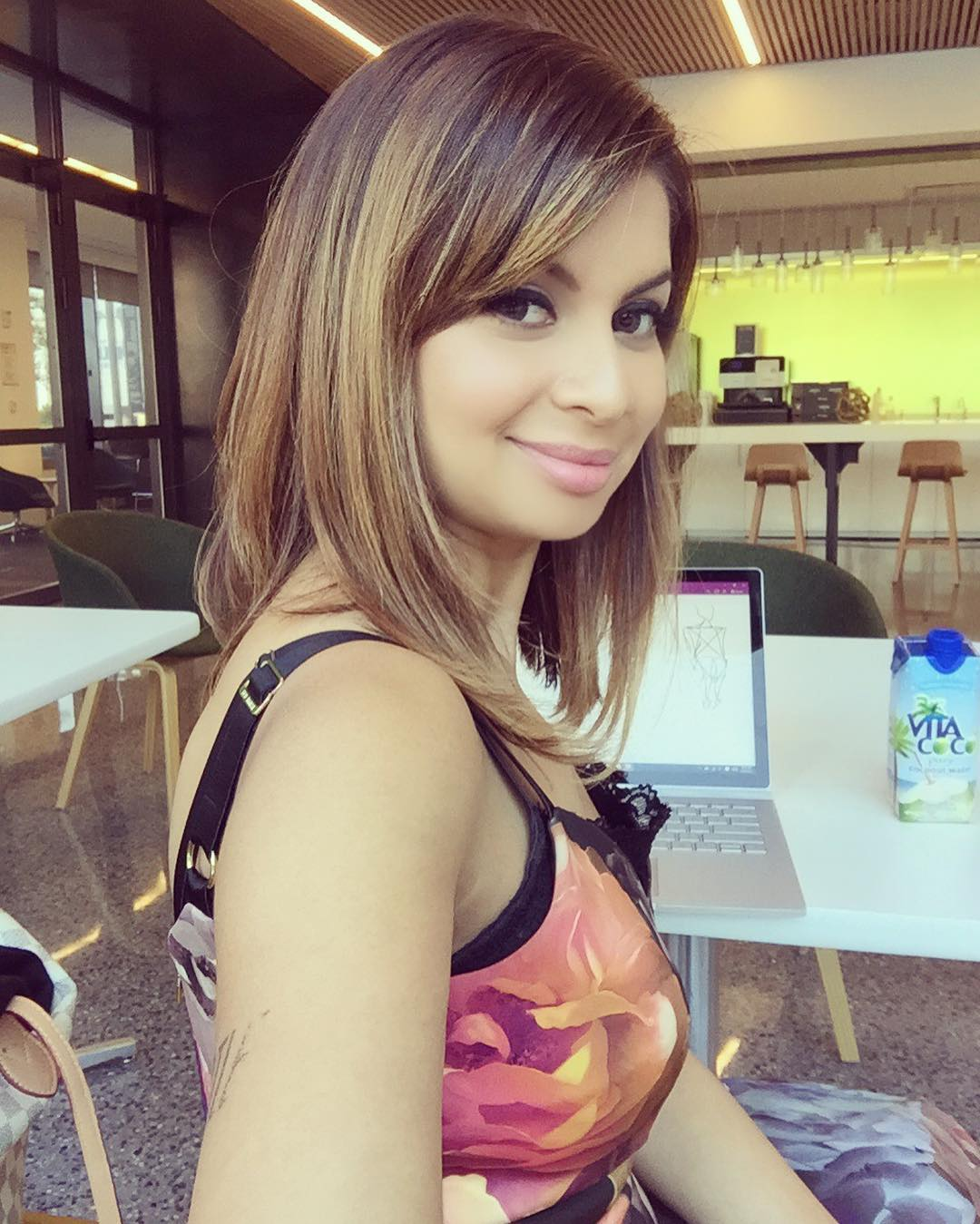
- Born: 29 August 1980 (age 46); Kathmandu, Nepal
- Education: University of Michigan
- Occupation: Director of Technology for Microsoft Accessibility
- Website: donasarkar.com

Dona Sarkar is a software engineer, author, public speaker and the owner of a fashion business.

She is currently leading a Developer Relations program at Microsoft focused on AI, Copilot and Agents Skilling. Previously she was the Director of Technology for Microsoft Accessibility. Previously, she led an advocacy team for the Power Platform, a low-code/no-code development platform at Microsoft. She was the head of the Windows Insider software testing group at Microsoft from 2016 to 2019.

Sarkar attended University of Michigan, where she studied computer science.

In June 2016, Sarkar replaced Gabe Aul as the head of the Windows Insider public testing group. One of her projects was increasing the engagement with customers in emerging markets such as East and West Africa. She and her team created an entrepreneurship bootcamp for startup founders in Nigeria, Kenya, Uganda, Tanzania and Rwanda to better understand the tech needs for those starting and growing businesses. She co-authored a book, Model 47: A Startup Storybook, based on her experiences on this project.

She is a public speaker on topics around AI, mental health in the workplace, computer accessibility, getting out of one's comfort zone and overcoming imposter syndrome. She has appeared on stages at the United Nations, World Economic Forum and TEDx.

In 2009, Sarker set up an ethical fashion line called Prima Dona, based in Seattle, Washington.

In an interview conducted by Microsoft 365 Developer and Architect, Tom, at the 2021 South Coast Summit, Sarker discussed introducing software that is more accessible for people who are neurodivergent or have mental health issues. She reflected on her own struggle with dyslexia and how it affected her career in computer science.
