= Mind share =

When a brand is the first thing that comes to mind

Mind share is a marketing strategy related to the development of consumer awareness or popularity, and is one of the main objectives of advertising and promotion. When people think of examples of a product type or category, they usually think of a limited number of brand names. The aim of mind share is to establish a brand as being one of the best kinds of a given product or service, and to even have the brand name become a synonym for the product or service offered. For example, a prospective buyer of a college education will have several thousand colleges to choose from. However, the evoked set, or set of schools considered, will probably be limited to about ten. Of these ten, the colleges that the buyer is most familiar with will receive the greatest attention.

Marketers and promoters of mind share try to maximize the popularity of their product, so that the brand co-exists with deeper, more empirical categories of objects. Kleenex, for example, can distinguish itself as a type of tissue. But, because it has gained popularity amongst consumers, it is frequently used as a term to identify any tissue, even if it is from a competing brand. Q-tips and band-aids would be other examples of this.

Popularity can be established to a greater or lesser degree depending on product and market. For example, in the Southern U.S. it is common to hear people refer to any cola-flavored "soft drink" (non-alcoholic carbonated beverage) as a "coke" or "Coke", regardless of whether or not the beverage is actually produced by the Coca-Cola Company.

A legal risk of such popularity is that the name may become so widely accepted that it becomes a generic term and loses trademark protection. Examples include "escalator", "panadol", "chapstick", "tupperware", and "band-aid". Companies will often attempt to prevent a product name from becoming generic to avoid losing trademark protection. Xerox Corporation attempted to prevent the genericization of its core trademark through an extensive public relations campaign advising consumers to "photocopy" instead of "xerox" documents.

Other objectives of mind share include short or long term increases in sales, market share, product information, and reputation.

== See also ==
- Advertising
- Genericized trademark
- Googleshare
- Marketing
- Market share
- Promotion
- Top-of-mind awareness
