= Promotional mix =

Blend of promotional variables for marketing purposes

In marketing, the promotional mix describes a blend of promotional variables chosen by marketers to help a firm reach its goals. It has been identified as a subset of the marketing mix. It is believed that there is an optimal way of allocating budgets for the different elements within the promotional mix to achieve best marketing results, and the challenge for marketers is to find the right mix of them. Activities identified as elements of the promotional mix vary, but typically include the following:

- Advertising is the paid presentation and promotion of ideas, goods, or services by an identified sponsor in a mass medium. Examples include print ads, radio, television, billboard, direct mail, brochures and catalogs, signs, in-store displays, posters, mobile apps, motion pictures, web pages, banner ads, and emails.
- Personal selling is the process of helping and persuading one or more prospects to purchase a good or service or to act on any idea through the use of an oral presentation, often in a face-to-face manner or by telephone. Examples include sales presentations, sales meetings, sales training and incentive programs for intermediary salespeople, samples, and telemarketing.
- Sales Promotion is media and non-media marketing communication used for a predetermined limited time to increase consumer demand, stimulate market demand or improve product availability. Examples include coupons, sweepstakes, contests, product samples, rebates, tie-ins, self-liquidating premiums, trade shows, trade-ins, and exhibitions. Corporate giveaway items, sometimes called swag, can be included within product samples and distributed to participants at an event for promotional purposes.
- Public relations or publicity is information about a firm's products and services indirectly carried by a third party. This includes free publicity as well as paid efforts to stimulate discussion and interest. It can be accomplished by planting a significant news story indirectly in the media, or presenting it favorably through press releases or corporate anniversary parties. Examples include newspaper and magazine articles, TV and radio presentations, charitable contributions, speeches, issue advertising, and seminars. Word of mouth is also a type of publicity, which transform from the person-to-person storytelling to social media influencers, or bloggers promotions today.
- Direct Marketing is a channel-agnostic form of advertising that allows businesses and nonprofits to communicate directly to the customer, with methods such as mobile messaging, email, interactive consumer websites, online display ads, fliers, catalog distribution, promotional letters, and outdoor advertising.
- Corporate image campaigns have been considered as part of the promotional mix.
- Sponsorship of an event, contest or race is a way to generate publicity.
- Guerrilla marketing tactics are unconventional ways to bring attention to an idea, product or service, such as by using graffiti, sticker bombing, posting flyers, using flash mobs, doing viral marketing campaigns, or other methods using the Internet in unexpected ways.
- Product placement is paying a movie studio or television show to include a product or service prominently in the movie or show.
- Digital marketing is the marketing of products or services using digital technologies, mainly on the Internet, but also including mobile phones, display advertising, and any other digital medium.

== See also ==
- Advertising
- Advertising campaign
- Advertising management
- Advertising media
- Advertising media selection
- Advertising research
- Audience measurement
- Brand awareness
- Branded content
- Consumer behaviour
- DAGMAR
- Digital marketing
- Digital promotion
- Integrated marketing communications
- Marketing
- Marketing communications
- Media planning
- Media buying
- Native advertising
- Online advertising
- Promotion (marketing)
- Sales promotion
