= SpyFu =

American search analytics company

SpyFu (originally GoogSpy) is an American search analytics company based out of Scottsdale, Arizona that provides SEO services.

== History ==
SpyFu was founded in April 2005. The online platform provides keywords that websites buy on Google Ads, as well as keywords used for search engine results. The service also gives cost per click and search volume statistics on keywords and uses that data to approximate what websites are spending on advertising.

Historical advertising budgets offered by SpyFu also help advertisers project what an advertising campaign will cost in the future. The main value proposition is to see or to "spy on" the keywords that competitors use and improve SEM and SEO strategies based on those. SpyFu's data was also used in the Washington Post during the 2008 Presidential election to disclose various keywords that candidates were advertising on. SpyFu can also uncover emerging or niche markets. SpyFu has been mentioned in The 4-Hour Work Week, Oreilly's Complete Web Monitoring, and SEO Warrior.

== Data ==
SpyFu's data is obtained via web scraping, based on technology developed by Velocityscape, a company that makes web scraping software. The accuracy of its data, especially advertising budgets, was found to be somewhat dependent on the size of the website in question. SpyFu refreshes its data on a monthly basis, and as such is used as a guide to what's happening with larger trends in SEM/SEO rather than as a real time tracking engine.
