= Tear sheet =

Paper document to confirm publication of an advertisement

In advertising, a tear sheet is a page cut or torn from a publication to prove to the client that the advertisement was published. Media buying agencies are often required by clients to provide tear sheets along with a post analysis of any advertising campaign. With the emergence of online advertising, tear sheets often now appear in the form of a PDF file, known as a "virtual tear sheet" or "electronic tear sheet". Tear sheets are also used by writers, models, and photographers as proof that their work was published. Some advertisers also use tear sheets as a form of direct mail marketing, which aims to cultivate a feeling of authenticity by appearing to be sent by an individual.

In costume or fashion design, designers use "tear sheets" to mean "collections of visual pieces that spark inspiration, set a tone and drive design, and provide vision and ideas." Such tear sheets are sometimes referred to as a "mood boards".

In finance, a tear sheet provides a one-page summary of a company or portfolio, containing current and historic information on the company such as market cap, sector, graph of historic share price. They can also be referred to as "Fund Fact Sheets" or "Ditos".

In the United States Department of Defense, a tear sheet is a draft message (e.g. memo or email) a subordinate writes for and sends to a superior for review, editing, and sending.
