= Attention tracking =

Attention tracking is an attention-measurement procedure. In contrast with classical machine-based eye tracking, during attention tracking, attention is measured with a computer mouse or comparable pointing device. The attention data occurs in the form of mouse clicks.

== Development ==
The basic idea for attention tracking emerged during a research project at the California Institute of Technology. During this project the correspondence of eye tracking and clicking data was found by accident. In general the procedure is based on the fact that attention does not only control the view but also other motoric systems. After a short introduction and training, respondents can follow their attention with the mouse.

In comparative studies with classical machine-based procedures significant correlations (r>0.92) were found between the data gained with the machine-based procedure and the data gained with attention tracking.

== Measurement process ==
The measurement starts with a small training during which the respondent is gradually introduced and accustomed to the desired click behavior. The training ensures that only respondents with sufficient mouse competence and speed take part in the test – simply put, hand and eye movement are synchronized. Directly after the training the actual measurement starts. The trained click behavior is then continued on the presented visual stimuli. In the same time point-and-click is recorded. The click data are interpreted as points of attention (Fixation (visual)) and can be analyzed and visualized analogously to the classical eye tracking.

== Fields of application ==
The attention tracking procedure can generally be used for all areas of application in which classical eye movement tracking can be used. The procedure is used in basic research as well as in applied research.

Since 2003 the procedure is commercially used in market research, especially advertising research, to analyze the effect of advertising material. Through the online realization of the procedure the attention measurement can be included in target group-specific, supra-regional surveys.

== See also ==
- Eye tracking
