= Adcept =

Marketing and advertising development tool

An Adcept is a tool used in marketing and advertising development to test creative ideas or brand positionings. The term is an amalgamation of the words 'advertising' and 'concept', indicating its role as a halfway stage between a concept idea and an advertising execution. Traditionally, adcepts have been used to check early creative work, typically with advertising agency clients or in market research focus groups.

== An alternative to concept statements ==
Traditionally, qualitative market research has used concept statements and mood boards to test ideas with target consumers. However, Richard Woods (Journal of Consumer Behaviour, Vol.3, 4 388-403) argues that concept boards are unfamiliar and lack emotional appeal. They also attempt to pull apart the rational and the emotional, which goes against how the human mind evaluates ideas. Because advertising is the popular language of brands, he claims, adcepts are easier for consumers to relate to, and to evaluate.

== Formats ==
Adcepts can be highly finished and closely resemble final advertising or they can be made to be deliberately conceptual. When used as research stimulus, Richard Woods argues that this rougher, conceptual format is needed. Showing very polished adcepts to focus group participants leads them to pass judgment on the specific execution rather than examining the core idea being explored.

== Applications ==
At their most basic level, adcepts are useful for testing advertising ideas that are works in progress. However, when used in place of concept boards, they are ideally suited to isolating what a brand could stand for, and exploring the areas it could expand into in the future.
