= Global marketing =

Marketing on a worldwide scale

Global marketing is defined as "marketing on a worldwide scale reconciling or taking global operational differences, similarities and opportunities to reach global objectives".

Global marketing is also a field of study in general business management that markets products, solutions, and services to customers locally, nationally, and internationally.

International marketing is the application of marketing principles in more than one country, by companies overseas or across national borders. It is done through the export of a company's product into another location or entry through a joint venture with another firm within the country, or foreign direct investment into the country. International marketing is required for the development of the marketing mix for the country. International marketing includes the use of existing marketing strategies, mix and tools for export, relationship strategies such as localization, local product offerings, pricing, production and distribution with customized promotions, offers, website, social media and leadership.

Internationalization and international marketing is when the value of the company is "exported and there is inter-firm and firm learning, optimization, and efficiency in economies of scale and scope".

Evolution The international marketplace was transformed by shifts in trading techniques, standards, and practices. These changes were reinforced and sustained by advanced technologies and evolving economic relationships among the companies and organizations involved in international trade. The traditional ethnocentric conceptual view of international marketing trade was counterbalanced by a global view of markets.

== Domestic marketing ==
Domestic marketing consists of the marketing strategies used by a company to allow customers to purchase a product or service within a local market

Domestic marketing leads to familiarity with the extent of political risk, the quality of skilled human resources and natural resources, and the ramifications of existing and likely legislation in relevant areas such as safety, hygiene, employment, and ownership of capital.

These markets are restrained by the laws and regulations of the country. Domestic marketing is typically organized at the headquarters.

== Global marketing ==
Global marketing relies on firms that understand the requirements associated with servicing customers locally using globally standardized solutions or products, and localize those products to maintain an optimal balance of cost, efficiency, customization, and localization along a control-customization continuum to meet local, national, and global requirements.

Global marketing and global branding are integrated. Branding is a structured process of analyzing "soft" assets and "hard" assets of a firm's resources. The strategic analysis and development of a brand includes customer analysis (trends, motivation, unmet needs, segmentation), competitive analysis (brand image/brand identity, strengths, strategies, vulnerabilities), and self-analysis (existing brand image, brand heritage, strengths/capabilities, organizational values).

== Elements ==
=== Product ===
A minimum level of performance is placed onto each product.

=== Price ===
The price of a product varies based on production cost, target segment, and supply-demand dynamics alongside several types of pricing strategies, each tied in with an overall business plan. Pricing is also used as a demarcation to differentiate the image of a product.

The price varies from market to market.

=== Place ===
The place refers to the point of sale.

The distribution of products is reliant on the competition offered to the market. Coca-Cola does not implement vending machines in all cultures. Beverages are sold by the pallet via warehouse stores in the United States while it is not seen in India. Placement decisions are reliant on the position of the product in the marketplace. For example, a high-end product would not be distributed via a dollar store in the United States. Conversely, a product promoted as the low-cost option in France would give rise to limited success in a high end area.

=== Promotion ===
Advertising, word of mouth, press reports, incentives, commissions, and awards to the trade will account for product acknowledgement. It may also include consumer schemes, direct marketing, contests, and prizes.

=== People ===
People may be considered to be a firm's most valuable asset. Core values of firms such as integrity, honesty, leadership, social responsibility, drive for profit, and drive for quality products and services are reasons behind customer loyalty.

=== Processes ===
Processes for creating and delivering products and services are intangible assets that improves the quality of the products and services.

=== Physical Evidence ===
The Digital economy today enables firms to provide non-physical services over the internet and companies' products such as Software-as-a-Service (Saas). Historically, banks with retail locations signal the financial strength of their institutions. Retail locations for consumer brands add onto the evidence of the popularity and reach of their brands.

There are trust requirements before a customer makes a purchase from a company, as such, companies without brick and mortar must provide existential proof of their legitimate software company.

== Advantages ==
Global marketing may lead to:

- Economies of scale in production and distribution
- Lower marketing costs
- Power and scope
- Consistency in brand image
- Ability to leverage ideas quickly and efficiently
- Uniformity of marketing practices
- Helps to establish relationships outside of the 'political arena'
- Helps to encourage ancillary industries to be set up to cater to the needs of the global player
- Benefits of eMarketing over traditional marketing

== Disadvantages ==
Global marketing may also lead to:

- Differences in consumer needs, wants, and usage patterns for products
- Differences in consumer response to marketing mix elements
- Differences in brand and product development and the competitive environment
- Differences in the legal environment, some of which may conflict with those of the home market
- Differences in the institutions available, some of which may call for the creation of entirely new ones (e.g. infrastructure)
- Differences in administrative procedures
- Differences in product placement
- Differences in the administrative procedures and product placement can occur
- Differences in cultural norms can lead to miscommunication or brand misinterpretation

== See also ==
- Advertising
- Advertising research
- Globalization
- International marketing
- Marketing
- Marketing research
- Nation branding
- wikt:Picture Sorts
- Visual marketing
