= Top-of-mind awareness =

Concept in consumer behaviour

Top-of-mind awareness (TOMA) is a measure of how aware is a consumer of a brand. It is part of consumer behaviour, and is a key aspect of marketing research and marketing communications.

== Definitions of top-of-mind awareness ==
In marketing, "top-of-mind awareness" refers to a brand or specific product being first in customers' minds when thinking of a particular industry or category.

Top-of-mind awareness is defined in Marketing Metrics: "The first brand that comes to mind when a customer is asked an unprompted question about a category. The percentage of customers for whom a given brand is top of mind can be measured."

TOMA has also been defined as "the percent of respondents who, without prompting, name a specific brand or product first when asked to list all the advertisements they recall seeing in a general product category over the past 30 days."

At the market level, top-of-mind awareness is more often defined as the "most remembered" or "most recalled" brand names.

== Top-of-mind awareness: uses and applications ==
Top-of-mind awareness is a special form of brand awareness. Top-of-mind awareness is generally measured by asking consumers open-ended questions about the brand that first comes to mind in a particular category, like a fast-food restaurant (McDonald’s). Market researchers are then able to take this data and turn it into a percentage to figure out who is leading the way in top-of-mind awareness. Companies attempt to build and increase brand awareness using such digital marketing strategies as search engine optimization (SEO), search engine marketing (SEM), social media marketing (SMM), content marketing, and more.

In a survey of nearly 200 senior marketing managers, 50% responded that they found the "top-of-mind" metric very useful.

== See also ==
- Mind share
- Promotion
- Brand awareness
- Consumer Behaviour
