= Brand preference =

Consumer psychology

One of the indicators of the strength of a brand in the hearts and minds of customers, brand preference represents which brands are preferred under assumptions of equality in price and availability.

In layman's terms, brand preference relates to the psychological phenomenon where people have 'a favourite brand.' This can be driven by factors including a preference for the taste of the product or other sensory qualities; because the packaging may be appealing, or because the product was recommended by another. This is not an exhaustive list. More complicated factors can include emotional sentimentality (for example, positive nostalgic memories); affiliation with a product's source of origin, and other socioeconomic or political considerations. There is no reason any of the aforementioned must stand alone and combinations thereof are common.

== Purpose ==
Measures of brand preference attempt to quantify the impact of marketing activities in the hearts and minds of customers and potential customers. Higher brand preference usually indicates more revenues (sales) and profit, also making it an indicator of company financial performance.

== Construction ==
There are at least three classes of methodologies to measure brand preference directly:

- Survey questions (self-report, unaided preference)
- Brand choice measures (choice of preferred brand from a competitive set of brands)
- Constant sum measures (planned purchases amongst a competitive set of brands)

== Methodologies ==
- ARS Persuasion is a brand choice methodology applied at various stages of the marketing process. It is derived by comparing the percent choosing a particular brand versus competing brands before and after marketing activity .

- Firstep applies the methodology to a selling proposition before moving on to creative execution.
- APM Facts are the results of the methodology applied to TV ads. It has been audited and profiled by the Marketing Accountability Standards Board (MASB) according to MMAP (Marketing Metric Audit Protocol) . A MMAP audit examines the 10 characteristics of an "ideal metric," including reliability, calibration, predictive validity, etc.
- Brand Preference Monitor (BPM) tracks the impact of all marketing activity over time.
