= Advertising Research Foundation =

U.S. nonprofit industry association

The Journal of Advertising Research, one of the Advertising Research Foundation's publications

The Advertising Research Foundation (ARF) is a nonprofit industry association for creating, aggregating, and sharing knowledge in the fields of advertising and mass media. It was founded in 1936 by the Association of National Advertisers and the American Association of Advertising Agencies. Its stated mission is to improve the practice of advertising, marketing and media research in pursuit of more effective marketing and advertising communications.

Its membership consists of over 400 advertisers, advertising agencies, research firms, media companies, educational institutions and international organizations.

The ARF conducts several research initiatives. It publishes the Journal of Advertising Research, a peer-reviewed academic periodical. It also sponsors a variety of advertising-related marketing research endeavours and hosts periodic conferences on advertising and media-related topics. The ARF operates the Roy Morgan Information Center as a clearinghouse for advertising research, promulgating industry standards and guidelines, and it provides training and administers the annual David Ogilvy Awards Program.

== Knowledge Center ==
ARF's Knowledge Center houses original historical reports, papers and videos developed during the formative years of the advertising research industry. Established in 1953 to serve as a central resource for materials relating to advertising research, the ARF Knowledge Center also offers specialized tools and services to help ARF members keep up-to-date with the latest knowledge applicable to business needs.

== History ==
The Advertising Research Agency was formed in 1936. During its first 15 years, ARF sponsored over 200 studies including studies involving newspapers, farm magazines, business magazines, and an executive management publication.

In the beginning of the 1950s, the ARF began working with media companies in addition to advertisers and agencies. The agency supervised a study on household ownership of radio & television sets in 1954. It also published "Recommended Standards for Radio & Television Program Audience Size Measurements," in 1954. In 1955 the ARF influenced the U.S. Census Bureau to include a TV ownership question in its questionnaires. Research companies were invited to become ARF members in 1967.

During the 1990s, the ARF spearheaded primary research in studies such as the Copy Research Validity Project, which redefined the area of copy testing, and the ARF/Ad Council Study to determine the impact of public service advertising. More recently, the ARF has pioneered efforts to define advertising engagement and to measure consumers' emotional responses to advertising.

== Forums ==
The ARF hosts forums, which are meetings and presentations where industry experts and members can share knowledge and information. Forums are held in the ARF's NYC office located at 432 Park Avenue South and are also available virtually.
