= Media planning =

Selection of media platforms for a marketing campaign

Media planning entails sourcing and selecting optimal media platforms for a client's brand or product to use. The goal of media planning is to determine the best combination of media to achieve the clients objectives.

In the process of planning, the media planner needs to answer questions such as:

- How many of the audience can be reached through the various media?
- On which media (and ad vehicles) should the ads be placed?
- How frequently should the ads be placed?
- How much money should be spent on each medium?

Choosing which media or type of advertising to use can be challenging for small firms with limited budgets and know-how. Large-market television and newspapers are often too expensive for a company that services only a small area (although local newspapers can be used). Magazines, unless local, usually cover too much territory to be cost-efficient for a small firm, although some national publications offer regional or city editions. Since the advent of social media, small firms with limited budgets may benefit from using social media advertising as it is cost-effective, easy to manage, accurate, and offers great ROI. In some agency, media planner will work together with the media implementer.

== Developing a Media Plan ==
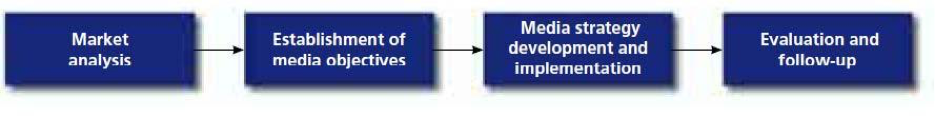
Developing a Media Plan

The fundamental purpose of a media plan is to determine the best way to convey a message to the target audience. A media plan sets out a systematic process that synchronizes all contributing elements in order to achieve this specific goal. The media plan is broken down into four stages; market analysis, establishment of media objectives, media strategy development and implementation, and evaluation and follow-up.

Similarities can be made to other marketing concepts such as the consumer decision-making process with comparisons such as, increasing brand awareness, improving brand image, and the maximization of customer satisfaction.

The first phase of any media plan is the initial market analysis, which consists of a situation analysis and the marketing strategy plan. These form the basis of information which the rest of the media plan is reliant on. The purpose of a situation analysis is to understand the marketing problem, in relation to their competitors. For example, undertaking an internal and external review or competitive strategy evaluation.

The marketing strategy plan should establish specific objectives and goals that will solve the marketing problems that developed. Once the market analysis is complete the improved knowledge gained should indicate a proffered target market. Enabling the marketers to understand where the prime advertising space would be to gain sufficient exposure, what factors affect that certain demographic, and how to promote to the audience effectively.

The second phase in the media plan is the establishment of media objectives. Just as the marketing analysis leads to specific marketing objectives, this phase will result in explicit media objectives; such as creating a positive brand image through stimulating creativity. These objectives should be limited to those that can only be obtained through media strategies.

Media strategy development and implementation is the third phase and is the point in the process that is directly influenced by the actions from previously determined objectives. Actions that meet these objectives are taken into consideration with the following criteria; media mix, target market, coverage consideration, geographic coverage, scheduling, reach & frequency, creative aspects & mood, flexibility, or budget considerations. Each of these criteria are explained briefly below:

- Media Mix – A combination of communication and media channels use that are utilized to meet marketing objectives, such as social media platforms and magazines.
- Target Market – A specific group of consumers that has been identified to aim its marketing and advertising campaigns towards, as they are the most likely to purchase the particular product.
- Coverage Consideration – To alter the level of exposure of media to the target market, whilst minimizing the amount of overexposure and saturation into other demographics.
- Geographic Coverage – Increased emphasis of exposure to a certain area where interest may thrive, whilst reducing exposure to areas they have less relevance.
- Scheduling – The concept of aligning communication activity to coincide with peak potential consumer exposure times, such as around a big sports game on television.
- Reach & Frequency – The decision to have a certain message seen / heard by a large number (reach) or expose the same message to a smaller group more often (frequency).
- Creative Aspects & Mood – Different mediums for communication should be considered when developing a campaign. Social media might be more effective in generating emotion than a billboard poster on a main road.
- Flexibility – In order to adapt to rapidly changing marketing environments it is important for strategies to be flexible. Such as unique opportunities in the market, media availability or brand threats.
- Budget Considerations – The relationship between the effectiveness of a media campaign and the cost involved needs to be carefully managed. There should be an optimal level of response from the consumer for the price of the exposure.

The final phase in the media plan is to evaluate the effectiveness of the plan and determine what follow-up is required. It is important to assess whether each individual marketing and media objective was met, as if they were successful it will be beneficial to use a similar model in future plans.

== Components of a media plan ==
- Define the marketing problem. Where is the business coming from and where is the potential for increased business? Does the ad need to reach everybody or only a select group of consumers? How often is the product used? How much product loyalty exists? How to build awareness or drive consideration through the use of optimized contextual based material?
- Translate the marketing requirements into media objectives. Must the ad reach people in a wide area? Then mass media, like newspapers and radio, might work. If the target market is a select group in a defined geographic area, then direct mail could be best.
- Define a media solution by formulating media strategies. For example, the rule of thumb is that a print ad must run three times before it gets noticed. Radio advertising is most effective when run at certain times of the day or around certain programs, depending on what market is being reached.

Media planning's major steps include:

- 1 - Targeting,
- 2 - Environmental scan,
- 3 - Understanding the audience,
- 4 - Determination of content,
- 5 - Control.

== Advertising media includes ==
- Social (Facebook, Twitter, Instagram, Pinterest, WhatsApp, TikTok, etc.)
- Television ( TVC/Television Commercial, TV Sponsorship)
- Radio (AM, FM, XM, Pandora, Spotify)
- Newspapers
- Magazines (consumer and trade)
- Outdoor billboards. (Print and Digital)
- Ambient experiential
- Public transportation Could be on the transportation or the station itself
- Direct Media (DM)
- Digital advertising (such as web-based, mobile and mobile applications)
- Search engine marketing (SEM, keyword marketing in search engines)
- Specialty advertising (on items such as matchboxes, pencils, calendars, telephone pads, shopping bags and so on)
- Other media (catalogs, samples, handouts, brochures, newsletters and so on)

== Factors to consider when comparing various advertising media ==
- Reach - expressed as a percentage, reach is the number of individuals (or homes) to expose the product to through media scheduled over a period of time.
- Frequency - using specific media, how many times, on average, should the individuals in the target audience be exposed to the advertising message? It takes an average of three or more exposures to an advertising message before consumers take action.
- Cost per thousand - How much will it cost to reach a thousand prospective customers (a method used in comparing print media)? To determine a publication's cost per thousand, also known as CPM, divide the cost of the advertising by the publication's circulation, multiplied by its reader's per copy, in thousands. For example, magazine A's audited circulation is 250,000 with an audited readers per copy, or RPC of 3.5. A full-page ad in the magazine costs $45,000. Therefore, CPM = $45,000 / (1,000,000 x 3.5) x 1000. So, Magazine A's CPM = $12.85. Using CPM for evaluating media makes it an, “apples to apples” comparison.
- Cost per point - how much will it cost to buy one rating point of your target audience, a method used in comparing broadcast media. One rating point equals 1 percent of the target audience. Divide the cost of the schedule being considered by the number of rating points it delivers.
- Impact - does the medium in question offer full opportunities for appealing to the appropriate senses, such as sight and hearing, in its graphic design and production quality?
- Selectivity - to what degree can the message be restricted to those people who are known to be the most logical prospects?

Reach and frequency are important aspects of an advertising plan and are used to analyze alternative advertising schedules to determine which produce the best results relative to the media plan's objectives. Generally speaking, you will use reach when you are looking to increase your consumer base by getting more people buying your product and you will privilege frequency when you need to narrow down your communication to a more specific audience but need to increase the number of times they could be exposed to your message in order to generate a change in behavior.

Calculate reach and frequency and then compare the two on the basis of how many people will be reached with each schedule and the number of times the ad will connect with the average person. Let's say the ad appeared in each of four television programs (A, B, C, D), and each program has a 20 rating, resulting in a total of 80 gross rating points. It is possible that some viewers will see more than one announcement—some viewers of program A might also see program B, C, or D, or any combination of them.

For example, in a population of 100 TV homes, a total of 40 are exposed to one or more TV programs. The reach of the four programs combined is therefore 40 percent (40 homes reached divided by the 100 TV-home population).

Researchers have charted the reach achieved with different media schedules. These tabulations are put into formulas from which the level of delivery (reach) for any given schedule can be estimated. A reach curve is the technical term describing how reach changes with increasing use of a medium.

Now assume the same schedule of one commercial in each of four TV programs (A, B, C, D) to determine reach versus frequency. In our example, 17 homes viewed only one program, 11 homes viewed two programs, seven viewed three programs, and five homes viewed all four programs. If we add the number of programs each home viewed, the 40 homes in total viewed the equivalent of 80 programs and therefore were exposed to the equivalent of 80 commercials. By dividing 80 by 40, we establish that any one home was exposed to an average of two commercials.

To increase reach, include additional media in the plan or expand the timing of the message. For example, if purchasing "drive time" on the radio, some daytime and evening spots will increase the audience. To increase frequency, add spots or insertions to the schedule. For example, if running three insertions in a local magazine, increase that to six insertions so that the audience would be exposed to the ad more often.

Gross rating points (GRPs) are used to estimate broadcast reach and frequency from tabulations and formulas. Once the scheduled delivery has been determined from reach curves, obtain the average frequency by dividing the GRPs by the reach. For example, 200 GRPs divided by an 80 percent reach equals a 2.5 average frequency.

== Reach and Frequency ==
In media planning, reach is one of the most important factors, as the whole media planning is all about reach. The Purpose of the reach is exposure of brand (Belch & Belch, 2012). The higher the reach; the higher the brand exposure (Belch & Belch, 2012). And of course, higher exposure means high chances of new customers. When it comes to media planning most of the businesses decide well in advanced what their target market would be (Belch & Belch, 2012). They Choose their target market on the assumption that they already know who their customers would be (Ossi, 2015). Even though, choosing a target market for reach in media planning could be a very successful way to get to the potential customers of the brand, but this method leaves out potential customers outside of the target market; Customers the brand thought were not important to reach to (Ossi, 2015). Smart businesses also reach outside of their targeted market in order to know other segments that could be targeted (Ossi, 2015). Therefore, starting with a broader reach and then choosing target markets would be a much-informed decision; derived from actual data rather than just assumption. A broader reach is also beneficial for general brand awareness, otherwise many people outside of the targeted market never even get to hear about the brand.

In media planning, frequency is also a very important factor to consider. Most small businesses say "We just want to see what happens", which just wastes their money leading to disappointment on media planning ("The importance of frequency," n.d.). In Advertisement, once is just not enough ("The importance of frequency," n.d.). The biggest problem in media planning is; advertisers assume that someone would see their advertisement, would walk in their store and just buy something!!That is definitely not how it happens. There are five different steps for buying cycle a consumer goes through before actually purchasing something (Euan, 2013). These are awareness, interest, need, comparison and purchase ("The importance of frequency," n.d.). Frequency is important as it pushes a consumer towards the actual step of purchasing something. The understanding of how exactly a consumer goes through the buying cycle is very essential to grasp the importance of frequency in media planning. Initially, the idea of reach is there to increase the awareness and exposure, but people forget. 80% of people forget the advertisement they see within 24 hours or even sooner ("The importance of frequency when advertising," 2016). So, frequency is also important for awareness - decreasing the chances for forgetfulness. Secondly, frequency builds familiarity, familiarity builds trust ("The importance of frequency," n.d.) and trust builds interest. In need, it is absolute that the consumer is aware of the company and have somewhat trust/ interest. And again, frequency plays essential role is remembrance, trust and interest. Higher frequency also helps to beat the competition ("The importance of frequency when advertising," 2016). And finally, the consumer is on the final step of buying cycle the purchase, with the help of frequent advertisement. Without the good amount of frequency, a consumer would be very unlikely to get to the purchasing step. Thus, frequency is important because consistence advertisement reinforces top of mind brand awareness, brand favorability and brand loyalty among the current and potential consumers. Patience and effective frequency plays a great role in a business's long-term success.

== Unmeasured media planning ==
Prior to having historical and current data for new media options, many of the conventional planner's tools are stymied. FCB devised an algorithm and software to indirectly measure these new potential media by comparing their planned target demographics, comparing these to their 150 topic placements. Their "Umpire" program measured using a "delta square" - the lower the better.

== Tools used in Media Planning ==
- Online Advertising Research Tools - Alexa, Nielsen Online, Quantcast, SimilarWeb, and Compete
- Demand-side Platforms - AppNexus, Adobe Media Optimizer
- Offline Advertising Research Tools Nielsen Media Research for TV Audience Measurement GRPs, Nielsen Audio for Radio Measurement (previously known as Arbitron)
