= Annoyance factor =

Aspect of advertising

An annoyance factor (or nuisance or irritation factor (Note: While the phrase "irritation" ("factor" or "effect") in advertising is synonymous with "annoyance" ("factor" or "effect"), it is more frequently used in medical and pharmaceutical contexts.)), in advertising and brand management, is a variable used to measure consumers' perception level of annoyance in an ad, then analyzed to help evaluate the ad's effectiveness. The variable can be observed or inferred and is a type that might be used in factor analyses. An annoyance effect (or nuisance or irritation effect) is a reference to the impact or result of an annoying stimulus, which can be a strategic aspect of an advertisement intended to help a message stick in the minds of consumers. References to annoyance effects have been referred to as annoyance dynamics. (Note: "Got Annoyed? Examining the Advertising Effectiveness and Annoyance Dynamics," by: Anindya Ghose, PhD, Stern School of Business Param Vir Singh, PhD, Tepper School of Business Vilma Todri, PhD, Department of Information Systems and Operations Management, Emory University Thirty-Eighth International Conference on Information Systems, South Korea (2017)) While the words "factor" and "effect", as used in the behavioral sciences, have different meanings, in casual vernacular, they have been used interchangeably as synonymous. A more general or umbrella term would simply be advertising annoyance.

== History ==
Comment on advertising in 1850 associated some practices (disparagingly) with begging.

=== Measuring annoyance factors ===
The discipline of identifying and measuring annoyance in quantitative research became prevalent around 1968, (Note: "Advertising in America: The Consumer View," Raymond Augustine Bauer, PhD (1916–1977), & Stephen Abel Greyser, DBA (born 1935) American Association of Advertising Agencies & Harvard Business School, Division of Research, Graduate Studies (1968); OCLC 868983437, 1071064096) an outgrowth of the quantitative revolution in social sciences that began in the 1950s. Before that, use and assessment – theoretical and applied (pre-testing, case studies, etc.) – was mostly qualitative (even simply intuitive or anecdotal); although the literature, since 1968, (Note: The Ford and Carnegie Foundations, in the 1950s, issued reports encouraging business schools to incorporate behavioral sciences, mathematics, statistics, and other social sciences in teaching, thinking, and research. Around 1954, the Ford Foundation commissioned John Arnold Howard, PhD (1915–1999) (bio – OCLC 4780435477), to write a monograph on the topic. Howard, in turn, began examining behavioral, economic, and quantitative aspects of marketing; and his early work became seminal in the growth of quantitative analyses in marketing. (Research Traditions in Marketing, Gilles Laurent, Gary L. Lilien, Bernard Pras, eds., Springer Science+Business Media, 1993, p. 271; OCLC 968303787)) (Note: "Operations Research and Market Research," by John Arnold Howard, PhD (1915-1999), Journal of Marketing, Vol. 20, No. 2, October 1, 1955, pps. 143–149; OCLC 5546189688; ISSN 0022-2429) has been a mix of qualitative and quantitative. Identifying, testing, and evaluating annoyance factors is both cross-disciplinary and interdisciplinary. Activity includes psychology, sociology, anthropology, semiotics, economics, management science, and (since the advent of the information revolution about 1992) many fields related to information technology and engineering.

Generally, annoyance from an ad can be identified in three areas:

1. content
2. execution
3. placement

=== Annoyance in ad production and placement ===
Setting aside advances in technology, the interdisciplinary fields involved in production phases of broadcast media (including digital online) that deal with advertising annoyance – including film (videography), music, art, design, and copy – have remained relatively similar since the dawn of broadcasting.

== Applications ==
An annoyance stimulus can be (a) a desired marketing strategy or (b) an unavoidable, albeit inherent mix of attributes of a marketing message to weigh and balance or minimize. Traditional annoyance stimuli might feature repetitive phrases or repetitive ads (Note: "Brand Familiarity and Advertising Repetition Effects," by Margaret C. Campbell & Kevin Lane Miller, Journal of Consumer Research Vol. 30, No. 2, February 2003, pps. 292–304; OCLC 4643094954; ISSN 0093-5301) or an annoying communicator. Annoyance stimuli – whether nuanced, subtle, or overt – might involve creating an unpleasant sound, such as a bad jingle – one that consumers can't get out of their heads. In the Northeastern United States, specifically the New York and Philadelphia metropolitan areas, the Mister Softee jingle, officially titled "Jingle and Chimes", is both loved and hated. It sticks in people's heads. The New York Times characterized it as "exquisitely Pavlovian, triggering salivation or shrieking – sometimes both at once." In the same article, the New York Times asserted that "it is the textbook embodiment of an earworm: once heard, never forgotten."

Generally, broadcast and streaming advertising is annoying. Exceptions might include product placement – which avoids interruptions. Advertisers commonly try to appeal to positive emotions – and, with a careful mix of various gradations of annoyance(s), appealing to those emotions can be achieved. Nonetheless, the goal is to etch a message in the minds of consumers without turning them off. Capital outlay for the use of it can be relatively expensive for major consumer product companies and the research behind it, sophisticated.

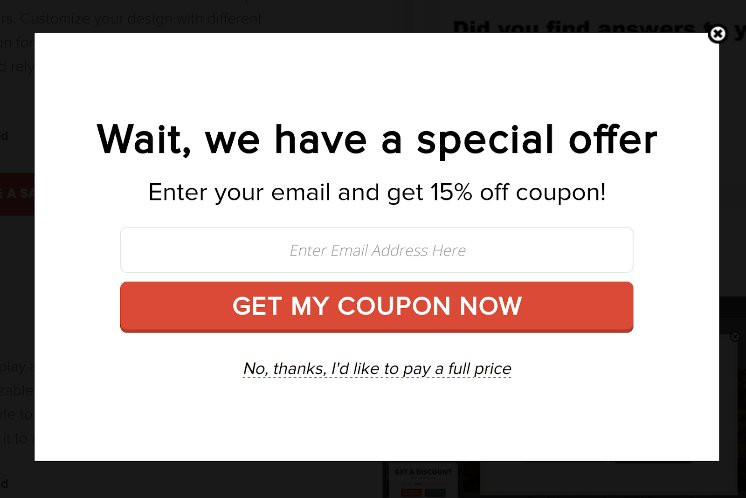
Example of an internet pop-up ad

Annoyance stimuli – visual or auditory or perceptual – can be in any combination of loudness, repetition, length ... On television, radio, print media, packaging, product displays, billboards, mail, telemarketing (especially robocalls), the internet – including email, and mobile devices, e.g.:

- banners
- pop-ups (Note: Digital Advertising: Theory and Research (3rd ed.), Shelly Rodgers, Esther Thorson, PhD (eds.), Routledge (1999, 2007, 2017), pps. 70 & 116; LCCN 2016-43446; OCLC 1101057869; ISBNs 978-1-138-65442-6 (hardcover), 978-1-138-65445-7 (paperback), 978-1-315-62325-2 (ebook), 978-1-317-22545-4,978-1-317-22546-1, 1-3156-2325-0, 1-3172-2545-7, 1-3172-2546-5)
- floating ads
- interstitials
- prevideo (skip and no-skip)
- autoplay video
- skyscrapers
- large rectangles
- sponsored social media content
- digital on-screen graphic

... also direct-to-consumer ads (especially pharmaceuticals), call to action marketing, and false ads. (Note: "Intrusiveness of Online Video Advertising and its Effects on Marketing Outcomes" (research-in-progress), by Kendall Phillip Goodrich, PhD, Shu Schiller, PhD, Dennis Galletta, PhD, Thirty Second International Conference on Information Systems, Shanghai 2011)

The annoyance stimuli of some ad campaigns might be so subtle that, initially, it is unnoticeable, but over time, highly noticeable. For instance, Folgers Coffee, which was acquired by Procter & Gamble in 1963, ran high frequency ads on TV and in print from 1965 to 1986 featuring "Mrs. Olson", portrayed by actress Virginia Christine (1920–1996). Some consumers initially perceived her messages as pleasant, but over time, annoying – as some research found. Yet, the annoyance technique was a successful brand-strengthening strategy. Under P&G, Folgers became the number one coffee brand in America. The target market of P&G's high-frequency campaign became multipronged. Consumers who infrequently watched TV were likely to see the message at least once (an effective reach strategy) – while those who binge-watched, even if annoyed, might still choose Folgers, if for no other reason, because the name is etched in their minds (an effective weight strategy). Although interruptions are annoying – whether high-frequency or long run-slots – the disruptions caused by the interruptions are most often intentional efforts to redirect the attention of viewers with the aim of sharpening their focus. Primetime TV (as of 2019) has breaks that run back-to-back 30-second ads for as long as 6-minute intervals.

=== Annoyance factor thresholds ===
When advertisers intentionally use annoyance stimuli, they strive to know annoyance thresholds (compare to anxiety thresholds) and carefully monitor them. Crossing thresholds can adversely affect brands and consumer behavior. For example, TV channel surfing – especially in eras following the emergence of remote controls, is a concern for advertisers and program producers. To mitigate viewer drift from surfing, programmers strategically place ads just moments in front of the apex of a plot device or rising action or climax or conclusion or in the midst of suspense – leaving viewers hanging. It doesn't significantly deter channel surfing, but it does lure surfers back. Strategic timing, however, is not commonly deployed in internet broadcasts. For example, a YouTube re-broadcast of CNN news might simply insert ad interruptions in random spots. Another way that major TV networks attempt to mitigate viewer drift from surfing is to synchronize ad-breaks with those of other networks so that their respective ads run at the same time; when a viewer switches to another channel during a commercial break, they will be switching to another advertisement. In some situations, the same sponsor will air an ad simultaneously on one or more of the other channels.

Advertising in premium venues or platforms (where consumers have already paid) – movie theaters, cable TV, satellite radio – are routine and generally accepted. Any associated annoyance factors, even perceptions of bait-and-switch, are dismissed by consumers as negative albeit long-standing unavoidable economic realities of the respective industries.

Email spam, universally accepted as an annoyance factor threshold breach, (Note: Note from Seth Grossman's paper (referenced below): According to a 2003 study by the Pew Internet and American Life Project, seventy-six percent of email users consider unsolicited email with political messages to be spam. ("Spam: How It Is Hurting email and Degrading Life on the Internet," by Deborah Fallows, Pew Internet and American Life Project, October 22, 2003)) can be effective from a statistical perspective. However, since 1998, when unsolicited political bulk email first became widespread, legal analyst Seth Grossman pointed out (in 2004) that state and federal governments increasingly have regulated unsolicited commercial email, but political spam had almost uniformly been exempted. Grossman averred that politicians apparently did not feel a need to regulate political spam, their argument being that they would never use spam, due to the annoyance factor.

== Challenges of minimizing avoidance of longer ads ==
For DVR-TiVo users, studies have shown that short ads, 5 seconds, are more effective than 30-second (and longer) ads – due to the annoyance factor of longer ads. The problem, however, is whether programmers can sell 5-second ads instead of 30-second (and longer) ads, with similar pricing – especially considering the challenge of consistently producing effective 5-second ads. (Note: "Reinquiry into Advertising Avoidance on the Internet: A Conceptual Replication and Extension," by Zahra Seyedghorban, PhD, Hossein Tahernejad, Margaret Jekanyika Matanda, PhD, Journal of Advertising, Vol. 45, No. 1, October 19, 2015, pps. OCLC 6013942665; ISSN 0091-3367)

=== Annoyance factors that influence ad avoidance ===
- Perceived intrusiveness (Note: "Physical and Mechanical Avoidance of Television Commercials: An Exploratory Study of Zipping, Zapping and Leaving," by Avery M. Abernethy, Proceedings of the American Academy of Advertising (1991); 223–231)
- Perceived informativeness
- Ad utilities
- High-pressure advertising (hard sell, as contrasted by soft sell)
- Questionable and polarized advertising, including pharmaceuticals (patent medicine, including off-label use), firearms, political campaigns, tobacco

== Annoying albeit effective ads ==
Some advertisements are deliberately annoying. Some are cute or funny, but, for some, wear thin over time. They can be "memorable, but not always effective".

=== North America ===
Mascots

- The Aflac Duck
- The Band (FreeCreditScore.com)
- Betty White (Snickers)
- Dusty the Dusthole (Clark County, Nevada)
- Energizer Bunny
- Erin Esurance
- Flo (Progressive)
- Go-Gurt independent child (Yoplait)
- The King (Burger King)
- GEICO gecko, GEICO Cavemen, Foghorn Leghorn (GEICO)
- HeadOn
- Kia Soul Hamsters
- Mayhem (Allstate)
- Mr. Mucus (Mucinex)
- Mr. Opportunity (Honda)
- Orbit girl (Orbit chewing gum)
- Peggy (Discover Card)
- Poppin' Fresh (Pillsbury)

Jingles

- "Jingles and Chimes" (Mister Softee)

Phrases

- "Help! I've fallen, and I can't get up!" (Life Alert)

== Exhibit of an annoyance factor analysis table ==
Factor analysis of perceptual items and attitude measures in online advertising:

Academicians Kelli S. Burns, PhD, and Richard J. Lutz, PhD, surveyed online users in 2002. In doing so, they chose six online ad formats: (i) banners, (ii) pop-ups, (iii) floating ads, (iv) skyscrapers, (v) large rectangles, and (vi) interstitials.

To develop perceptual factors, ratings of the 15 perceptual items for all six on-line ad formats were run through principal components analysis with varimax rotation. The authors inferred – from a scree plot – a possible three-factor solution. The first three factors accounted for over 68% of the total variance. The remaining 12 reflected no more than 5% of the variance, each. The first of the seven tables in their paper, Table 1 (below), shows the loadings of the factors generated through principal component extraction and varimax rotation.

Table 1
Summary of Factor Loadings for the Rotated Three-Factor Solution for Perceptual Items
	Perception	**Factor scores**
		**Factor I** **entertainment**	**Factor II** **annoyance**	**Factor III** **information**
1)	Innovative	**0.81**	(0.01)	0.07
2)	Different	**0.75**	(0.01)	(0.06)
3)	Entertaining	**0.75**	(0.27)	0.14
4)	Sophisticated	**0.72**	(0.07)	0.22
5)	Amusing	**0.71**	(0.34)	0.11
6)	Elaborate	**0.70**	0.24	0.17
7)	Eye-catching	**0.70**	0.24	0.17
8)	Attractive	**0.64**	(0.37)	0.32
9)	Disruptive	(0.04)	**0.89**	(0.21)
10)	Intrusive	0.06	**0.87**	(0.14)
11)	Overbearing	(0.03)	**0.86**	(0.23)
12)	Annoying	(0.12)	**0.85**	(0.25)
13)	Informative	0.08	(0.23)	**0.84**
14)	Useful	0.29	(0.37)	**0.74**
15)	Beneficial	0.35	(0.45)	**0.65**
(2002)		**Green boldface data indicate items loading on each factor**

== Performing arts analogy ==
Using annoyances as disruptive devices in advertising to help messages sink-in can be analogous to jarring devices used in performing arts. For example, in the Alvin Ailey American Dance Theater December 6, 2019, premier of Greenwood at City Center in New York, Donald Byrd (born 1949), the choreographer, described his work as "theater of disruption" ... "it disrupts our thinking about things, especially, in particular, things around race." The dance performance addresses a 1921 racist mob attack in Tulsa's then segregated Greenwood District, which, at the time, was one of the country's most affluent African American communities, known as "America's Black Wall Street."

== See also ==
The following subjects may address certain aspects or fall within the scope of annoyance dynamics.

General

- Ad tracking
- Advertising
- Advertising adstock
- Advertising campaign
- Advertising media selection
- Advertorial
- Ambient media
- Audience measurement
- Attack marketing
- Campaign advertising
- Cause marketing
- Celebrity branding
- Clutter
- Comparative advertising
- Conquesting
- Content marketing
- Customer engagement
- Database marketing
- Demographic targeting
- Direct marketing
- Engagement marketing
- Event marketing
- Frequency capping
- Global advertising
- Guerrilla marketing
- In-flight advertising
- Integrated marketing communications
- Interruption science
- Marketing communications
- Marketing buzz
- Mind share
- Mobile billboard
- Multichannel marketing
- Music in advertising
- Native advertising
- Out-of-home advertising (OOH)
- People meter
- Perceptual mapping
- Positioning
- Promotional mix
- Puffery
- Targeted advertising

Broadcast

- Bumper
- Channel surfing (compare or TV viewers ignoring ads)
- Commercial Advertisement Loudness Mitigation (CALM) Act (does not apply to cell-phone cast apps)
- Commercial skipping
- Gross rating point
- Radio advertisement
- Skinny bundle
- Television advertisement

TV-online hybrid

- Over-the-top media services (OTT)
- Virtual advertising

Illicit, malicious, or misleading

- Browser hijacking
- False advertising
- Malvertising
- Trick banner

Internet and mobile

- Ad exchange
- Ad blocking
- Admail
- Banner blindness
- Behavioral retargeting
- Clickbait (or Chumbox)
- Contextual advertising
- Conversion marketing
- Cost per action
- Cost-per-click
- Cost per lead
- Display advertising
- Dynamic ad insertion
- Freemium
- Geotargeting
- Mobile marketing
- Mobile phone content advertising
- Online advertising
- Opt-in email
- PPM (Pay per 1000 impressions)
- Run of network
- Search engine marketing
- Share of voice
- Surround sessions
- Sticky content
- Video advertising
- Viewable Impression
- Viral marketing

Psychology

- Racial stereotyping in advertising
- Sensory branding
- Sex in advertising
- Shock advertising

Research and criticism

- Advertising research
- Criticism of advertising
