= Attack marketing =

Type of marketing

Attack marketing is a form of marketing that incorporates a series of creative and strategic techniques used to build and maintain public awareness surrounding a person, place, product, or event. Attack marketing utilizes the power of social interactions to execute non-traditional marketing campaigns that drive sales, increase name awareness and create long-term buzz around a specific business.

Attack marketing is used by many marketing, advertising, public relations and promotional event marketing agencies to promote popular worldwide brands and events. Attack marketing can be tailored to fit marketing programs of all budgets, small and large.

== History ==
Attack marketing was traditionally used by bootstrapped businesses looking for cheaper forms of advertising. As the marketing industry evolved, engaging consumers who had been bombarded with duplicated advertisements became difficult.

The strategy of non-traditional marketing, such as attack marketing, gained greater popularity. Currently, attack marketing is prominently used to promote small businesses as well as larger brands such as Nike, Coca-Cola, Disney, Mars and more.

- In 1954, the Marlboro Man appears in Marlboro ads, making the company to become the #1 cigarette brand in the US.
- Guerrilla, ambush and attack marketing became popular in the 1970s.
- In 1982, Nike aired its first national television ads, created by newly formed ad agency Wieden Kennedy, during the New York Marathon.
- In 1984 Jay Conrad Levinson's book on Guerrilla Marketing is distributed to bookstores
- In 1986, Run DMC created a single called "My Adidas" and significantly raised Adidas shoe sales overnight.
- In the 1996 Atlanta Olympics, Linford Christie wore contact lenses embossed with the Puma logo at the press conference preceding the 100 meters final.
- The London Olympic Games and Paralympic Games Act 2006 restricts ambush, guerrilla, and attack advertising at the 2012 Summer Olympics.
- In 2011, Samsung opened a temporary pop-up store just two doors down from Apple’s Sydney store during the launch of the iPhone 4S. The company sold its Galaxy S II smartphone for only $2 to the first ten customers in line each day, creating long queues that rivaled those outside Apple’s store and drawing significant media attention.

The concept behind attack marketing is based on a form of warfare called guerrilla warfare which mainly focuses on ambushes, sabotage and the element of surprise. Although advertising has been around since the Egyptians in 4000 BC, due to an increase in economic activity, increase in technology and in increase in living standards around the world, advertising has been forced to adapt, making it more important to satisfy consumer wants and needs. This means that the aim of advertising has shifted, it is no longer to inform them or allow the consumer to have perfect knowledge of the market but rather to entertain or encourage them to buy. Seeing the changes around him Jay Conrad Levinson wrote his novel Guerrilla Advertising in 1984; this book highlighted benefits that attack advertising has for smaller businesses with smaller marketing budgets as well as unconventional methods for ensuring that an advertising campaign is memorable and relates to the customer on a personal level.

== Disadvantages ==
Many countries around the world are becoming more diverse and multi-cultural which makes it even harder to create a message that people find relatable, memorable as well as ensuring no one gets offended. As a result, this marketing strategy is constantly changing due to a shifts in cultural, social, economic, environmental and moral demands advertising agencies have to be on high alert for anything that could potentially be offensive. An example of this change is the use of movie stars endorsing popular cigarette brands in movies. This was a popular method of advertising with 88% of Walt Disney movies between 1999 and 2003 including smoking with the aim to endorse smoking as a societal norm. This, however, is an unacceptable practice in 2016 with campaigns to have smoke-free movies being created around the world. One of the aims of attack marketing is to reach high volumes of consumers; if a campaign is not thought out and is considered offensive or derogatory, the result can be catastrophic to businesses. This is in part due to social media. In the past, if a campaign was considered a "fail", the public could only coordinate small boycotts in protest, but now social media campaigns can mobilize far more people, which can destroy a business' brand.

=== Failed campaign ===
In 2007 Cartoon Network hired a third-party marketing firm to promote the new release of the cartoon Aqua Teen Hunger Force with a low-budget attack marketing strategy. They achieved this by developing little blinking electronic devices and placing them in the streets of Atlanta, New York, Los Angeles, Chicago and Boston. Weeks went by before a Boston citizen called the police mistaking the promotional device as an explosive device. Emergency services and the bomb squad were called out to the site and Boston went into lockdown. This failed marketing stunt cost Cartoon Network 2 million dollars in compensation to Boston services as well as a ruined reputation. This incident highlights the importance in understanding the changing environment as well as being able to communicate with your target market.

=== Successful campaign ===
Although this theory was created to help little firms with smaller budgets get ahead in their given industry, larger companies such as Coca-Cola have adapted this practice to suit them. Coca-Cola's "Happiness" campaign is an example of successful attack-style marketing. This was implemented through the use of vending machines dispensed throughout America which gave out free cokes, pizzas, footballs and other prizes. This was filmed and put on YouTube with the tag "where will happiness strike next?" These videos have had over 11 million combined views and are viewed on an international platform. This campaign was a major success and fits the definition of attack marketing: it ambushed and surprised the consumers at the various locations, created a large amount of social buzz, and was achieved through an unconventional method.

== Strategies ==
Attack marketing uses a number of different strategies to create memorable interactions between businesses and consumers, including use of:

=== Promotional staff to interact with consumers ===
- Brand ambassadors – knowledgeable brand representatives
- Promotional models – brand representatives that display brand image
- In-store demonstrators – brand representatives that demonstrate and distribute product samples
- Street teams – teams of brand ambassadors promoting brand outdoors

=== Non-traditional marketing techniques ===
- Street marketing – Outdoors promotions with promotional staff
- College campus activation – College campus marketing events and programs
- Social media – Event marketing online through Facebook, Twitter, etc.
- Mobile media – Promotional event marketing with vehicles
- Airport marketing – Product sampling and displays at airports
- Spring break marketing – Promotional event marketing at popular Spring Break destinations (flyering, product sampling, etc.)
- Publicity stunts – Flash mobs, mock protests with promotional models
- Green marketing – Event marketing using sustainable products
- Wearable media – Promotional marketing with electronics
- Outdoor postering – Outdoor poster placements
- Guerrilla projections – Outdoor digital displays during marketing event
- Chalking/stenciling – Outdoor sidewalk stenciling
- Flyer distributions – Public distribution of flyers by promotional staff
- Content 'protest' video marketing - Content adverts to highlight problems to drive brand awareness

To help execute attack marketing programs, many businesses hire other resource agencies that provide event staffing, field support and guerrilla marketing services to help with event logistics.

== Related forms of marketing ==
- Experiential marketing
- Guerrilla marketing
- Word of mouth marketing
- Ambush marketing
- Buzz marketing
- Content Marketing
- Email Marketing
- Digital Marketing
- Social Media Marketing
- Influencer Marketing
- Product Marketing
- Search Engine Marketing
- Affiliate Marketing
- Event Marketing
