= Surround =

Surround may refer to:

- Surround sound, a type of multichannel audio
- Surround (horse), Australian racehorse
- Surround (video game), an Atari 2600 video game cartridge
- Surround (Jon Bauer album), 2007
- Surround (Hiroshi Yoshimura album), 1986
- "Surround", a song by American Hi-Fi from the 2001 album American Hi-Fi
- "Surround", a song by Dada from the 1992 album Puzzle

== See also ==
- Surround channels, audio channels in surround sound
- Surround sessions, online advertising technique
- Door frame, or door surround, window surround, or niche surround, the architectural frame around an aperture
  - Gibbs surround, a type of architectural frame surrounding a door, window or niche
