= IAG Research =

Media measurement company

- Industry: Media
- Founded: 1999
- Founders: Alan Gould; Eric Gould; Ken Orkin
- Headquarters: New York City, New York, U.S.

IAG Research was a media-measurement company founded in 1999 in New York City by Alan Gould, Ken Orkin and Eric Gould. IAG conducted research with viewers to measure the effectiveness of advertising and program engagement across television and the Internet.

IAG was created to address growing concerns from large marketers that consumers were avoiding television advertisements because of ad-skipping DVRs, and because of high levels of ad clutter on TV. These concerns led marketers to seek out more granular forms of TV measurement, as TV at that time represented their largest ad expenditure.

In 2004, the company introduced a measurement for product placement and branded content to help marketers understand the performance and value of in-show brand integrations that could not be easily skipped.

Some in the media buying and planning industry including Starcom expressed skepticism about IAG's online methodology for acquiring viewer data. Over time IAG's methodology gained increased acceptance, leading more advertisers and all major TV networks to work with IAG prior to its 2008 acquisition.

In 2006, IAG metrics were the first non-Nielsen ratings ever used by a media company, NBC, to guarantee the performance of its advertising to Toyota, J&J and Verizon. In 2007, IAG began to integrate web and online video advertising metrics for its clients.

In 2008, IAG was acquired by the Nielsen Company under the leadership of CEO David Calhoun. The acquisition provided Nielsen with data on how consumers responded to television ads, alongside its measurement of TV viewership.

== Venture Partners ==
IAG's investors included Insight Partners, Bessemer Venture Partners, and AEA Investors.
