= \o/ =

\o/ may refer to:

- Victory
- Exasperation

== See also ==
- Emoticon
