= Street marketing =

Form of guerrilla marketing

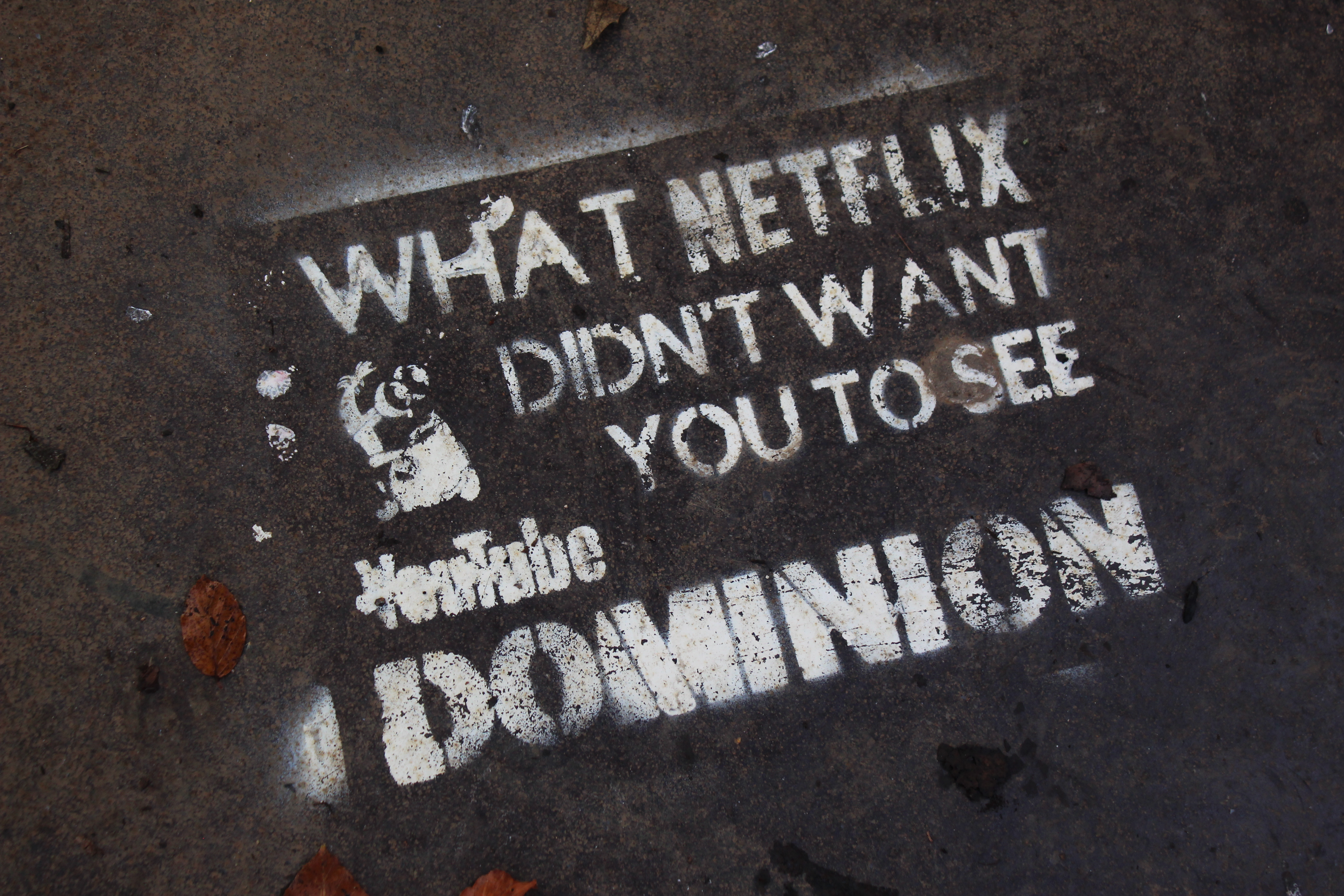
A stencil on the ground, promoting a documentary in Belgium

Street marketing is a form of guerrilla marketing that uses nontraditional or unconventional methods to promote a product or service. Many businesses use fliers, coupons, posters and art displays as a cost-effective alternative to the traditional marketing methods such as television, print and social media. Based on the shifting characteristics of modern-day consumers – such as increased product knowledge and expectations of transparency – the goal of street marketing is to use direct communication to enhance brand recognition.

This style of marketing grew in popularity in 1986 when Jay Conrad Levinson published his book Guerrilla Marketing, which paved the future for unconventional and abnormal brand campaigns. Street marketing is often confused with ambient marketing, which is a marketing strategy of placing ads on unusual objects or in unusual places where you wouldn't usually expect to have an advertisement. Unlike typical public marketing campaigns that use billboards, street marketing involves the application of multiple techniques and practices in order to establish direct contact with the customers. The goals of this interaction include causing an emotional reaction in potential customers, and getting people to remember brands in a different way.

== Origin ==
By definition, unconventional marketing exists in complete opposition to commercial marketing, which stems from the introduction of McCarthy's 4 Ps in 1960. Over the last five decades, street marketing has become an evolving topic of discussion, especially among SME's (small and medium-sized enterprises) who have little or no advertising budget. In the 1960s and 1970s, street marketing was a massive success since many consumers did not inevitably recognize guerrilla activities as an advertisement at this time because of its uncommon nature.

The concept of "street marketing" was first mentioned and analyzed by Jay Conrad Levinson in his 1984 book Guerrilla Marketing. Levinson came up with the idea of this approach to brand promotion when a student asked about a book for marketers without big budgets. After discovering that there was no such book, Levinson decided to write it himself, originating the strategy of "small budget, big results," which claimed to help many businesses survive in the 1980s and 1990s through these innovative advertising activities. Early on, the distribution of leaflets, coupons, posters or fliers made up the earliest form of street marketing and could be used in a strategic way to advertise to consumers for smaller businesses. The ease of using this kind of advertising strategy triggered a huge increase in the number of small businesses being opened.

There were two combined factors that carried street marketing to success; the first being that consumers had grown cynical and began to feel overwhelmed by the over-saturation of advertisements; the second was a shifting economic environment that forced businesses to create cost-effective ways to market their products. During the 2008 financial crisis, many large businesses were forced to cut their communication budgets drastically. In 2012, advertising revenue suffered a sharp drop, with television dropping 4.2% and a 8.1% drop for newspaper and press. These new budget cuts forced larger businesses and corporations to now adopt a new, unconventional way of advertising and promotion in the form of street marketing.

== Comparison with guerrilla marketing ==
Street marketing is a subset of guerrilla marketing, which is about investing time, energy, and imagination into a business campaign. Guerrilla marketing is popular among large and small businesses alike, as it uses low-cost unconventional communications which can provide a higher impact for a given investment. The use of viral marketing and engagement marketing help to heighten this impact. Guerrilla marketing exploits services which already exist, such as social networking sites, to create brand awareness. This could be spread by word of mouth or by exploiting social media. Viral messages appeal to individuals who already make high use of social networking, and because the messages do not look like traditional advertising the target audience is less likely to ignore them. Guerrilla marketing targets those who are more likely to share the message with others.

Street marketing has the characteristic of being non-conventional. However, unlike other forms of guerrilla marketing, it is limited to streets or public places and does not make use of other media or processes to establish communication with customers. One popular technique of street marketing is to place conventional advertisements such as billboards and static ads in unexpected or random locations, such as down alleys or behind large buildings, which causes additional interest. Street marketing may also use brand ambassadors (typically ones that appeal to the target demographic) who give away samples and coupons to customers that stop and take time to answer questions. Street marketing can be used as a general term encompassing six principal types of activities:

- Distribution of flyers or products – this activity is more traditional and the most common form of street marketing employed by brands.
- Product animations – the redressing of a high-traffic space using brand imagery. The idea is to create a micro-universe in order to promote a new product or service.
- Human animations – creating a space in which the brand's message is communicated through human activity.
- Roadshows – a mobile presentation, often using atypical transportation such as a taxibike, Segway, etc.
- Uncovered actions – the customization of street elements.
- Event actions – spectacles, such as flash mobs or contests. The idea is to promote a product, service, or brand value through the organization of a public event.

Before implementing a street-marketing plan, companies and their marketing firms should understand how they are perceived in the marketplace, how their products differ from those of competitors and what their most-appealing features are, and what markets they want to target. After identifying their target customers and where these people gather, specific goals for a street-marketing campaign can be established.

== Campaign development ==
According to Levinson, a successful street marketing campaign strives to meet any combination of the following objectives:

1. Communicate with consumers in their natural, day-to-day environment.
2. Generate "buzz" or word of mouth around a product, brand, cause, or institution.
3. Create brand awareness and loyalty through real-life participation in memorable experiences.

Over the years, street marketing has developed to include campaigns that use the street as a platform for experiences lived by the consumers through interaction with products/brands and the actors or props mobilized for that purpose.

Public places for the campaign should be identified, such as beaches, cultural events, places close to schools, sporting events and recreation centers for children. Companies then develop a plan to attract different media and the target market. Street marketing events involve unusual activities and technology, in order to gain the attention of potential consumers.

Plans should take into account global communication; the campaign interacts directly with the customers and media at the scene, and through them has the potential to reach a much wider audience. They may also be developed to identify opportunities and collect information about products, markets and competitors. To retain customers, strategies are implemented to prevent losing market position and the street marketing campaign may be augmented with supplemental advertisement through other mediums, such as radio and television.

=== Legal concerns ===
By definition, street mobilization campaigns require the use of public space, which must be authorized by government authorities to be legal. This includes seemingly simple operations like distributing flyers and handing out coupons. Other legal concerns can involve trespassing on private property, defacing private or public property and not getting direct permission from these property owners.

=== Ethical problems ===
Certain street marketing campaigns that are not executed properly can lead to certain ethical issues, like the 2007 Turner Broadcasting Bomb Scare in Boston, where the company placed LED placards in the shape of a film character for an upcoming movie campaign throughout Boston in random locations. When these placards lit up they resembled characteristics of explosive devices and resulted in the company paying 2 million dollars in fines.

Of course, a provocative campaign that creates awareness and attention is the primary objective of street marketing. However, advertising that becomes too persistent or intruding might also evoke negative emotions such as disappointment, sadness, anger, and fury. Certain campaigns that receive excess attention while also having a negative image could create an impact on the downstream criteria of the chain of effects (e.g., image, purchase intention, loyalty).

== Examples ==
The majority of street marketing campaigns have been from small companies, but large companies have also been involved. Most of the examples put into action include costumed persons, the distribution of tickets, and people providing samples.

Distribution of fliers can create awareness in consumers. One example of this took place in Montpelier, Vermont, where the New England Culinary Institute (NECI) sent a group of students to a movie theater to hand out 400 fliers. Those fliers had coupons in which NECI invited people to its monthly theme dinners. Another company, Boston's Kung-Fu Tai Chi Club, chose the option of disseminating fliers to promote its self-defense classes for women.

Other businesses apply the technique of sending disguised people to promote things on the streets. For example, a dating website organized a street marketing activity in the "Feria del Libro" ("Book Fair") in Madrid. It consisted of a man dressed like a prince who walked among the crowd looking for his "true love", and got some women to try on a glass slipper. A woman followed him distributing bookmarks with messages such as "Times have changed; the way to find love, too" with the website's address. In Madrid and Barcelona, a campaign called "Avestruz" ("Ostrich") used a group of life-sized ostrich puppets to interact with young people to promote mobile phones.

There are enterprises that disseminate passes or tickets to concerts and other events sponsored by a company. A more unusual example is a French fashion retailer which promoted a new store by distributing denim in the neighborhood. An Italian campaign for a video game plastered the streets with Post-it Notes shaped like game characters.

Some street marketing may incite the ire of local authorities, such as when an agency attached a styrofoam replica of a car to the side of a downtown building in Houston, Texas. For the cost of a small city-issued fine, the company received front-page advertising in the Houston Chronicle.

== See also ==
- Ambush marketing
- Field marketing
- Local store marketing
- Out-of-home advertising
- Reverse graffiti
- Street team
