= Racial stereotyping in advertising =

Racial stereotyping in advertising refers to using assumptions about people based on characteristics thought to be typical of their identifying racial group in marketing.

Advertising trends may adopt racially insensitive messages or comply with stereotypes that embrace the values of problematic racial ideologies. Commercials and other forms of media advertisements may be influenced by social stigma regarding race.

Racial stereotypes are mental frameworks that viewers use to process social information based on their cultural, racial, or ethnic group, which may not directly "carry negative or positive values." Advertisers include racial stereotypes in their messaging to target a specific demographic, which can potentially impact viewers negatively through offensive language or concepts. A common rule of thumb for people working in advertising is to "be aware of the potential to cause serious or widespread offense when referring to different races, cultures, nationalities or ethnic groups."

== Defining racism in advertising ==
There is no universal definition of racism or standard for detecting it within the scope of advertisement. Racial tropes are commonly used to target a particular demographic, which tends to lead to insult. The ambiguous nature of defining racism creates a debate about whether it is ethical to use stereotypes in advertisements. Those against racial stereotyping argue that using archetypes as representative of a population is an oversimplification of an entire race of people and further narrows the representation available of marginalized groups. This perspective argues that the media is especially harmful because commercial advertisements are one of the most prevalent and commonplace forms of media. Conversely, others believe that advertisements may use racial stereotypes as long as they do not cause intentional or lasting harm to a population.

Stereotypes are the inferred beliefs of roles, attributes, or positions assigned to different people based on factors like race, religion, sexual orientation, or gender. Advertisers use stereotypes to provide familiarity to a viewer, but pose the risk of generalizing and misrepresenting groups of people to a large audience.

A debate has existed historically around using stereotypes in advertising, but can be simplified by the "mirror" vs. "mold" argument coined by Pollay in 1986. This argument states that advertising "mirrors" society and does not present ideas to viewers that do not already exist as stereotypes. The "mirror" theory argues that advertising reflects the lifestyles and ideals of society and that it is this mirroring effect that drives familiarity with the product or service offered and the subsequent consumer engagement. However, the "mold" argument maintains that advertising influences society, and thus encourages stereotypes because of their ubiquity. The "mold" theory argues that sales are driven by society attempting to conform to the stereotypes and ideas communicated in advertising, as it shapes their own values and beliefs.

Stereotypes in advertising include creating caricatures based upon a perceived notion of a particular group. The limited amount of time given for a commercial advertisement leads to simplified characters who may employ archetypal traits. Audiences use stereotypes to fill in holes in a general character's backstory. Within a thirty-second commercial, advertisers rely on audiences' preconceived notions to understand a character and situation based on the strict prioritization of their time. Stereotypes facilitate a collective but unspoken understanding of the meaning of the commercial, even if the stereotype is damaging to the affiliated group.

== Targeting specific demographics ==
Racial stereotyping has the potential to reap results for a company if it targets a particular demographic. Audiences have perceptual biases toward people or characters similar to themselves and within their in-group. An in-group consists of people whom individuals socially identify with through similarities in characteristics such as age, race, gender, and religion. Studies have shown that "the enhancement of in-group bias is more related to increased favoritism toward in-group members than increased hostility toward out-group members." Advertisers use this knowledge when targeting a product or service to a particular market and may use demographics to inform the messages they present. Different countries and cultures speak different languages and understand symbols differently, so an advertiser must tactfully account for in-group bias. Viewers are more likely to cast favoritism toward people they can socially identify with. Advertisers, therefore, consider the audience heavily when figuring out how to present their characters. This thought process explains why advertisers use racial stereotyping they may not recognize as offensive.

Advertisers argue that specific demographics can be used to simultaneously employ racial stereotypes and create a successful result for an audience. This argument suggests that a company can achieve successful marketing while creating a message which viewers can identify and connect with. Sociologist Stuart Hall argues that reading a particular image depends not only on the messages contained in it, but on the messages surrounding it and the situational, societal, and historical context. He claims that society constructs stereotypes and it is not a company's responsibility to avoid them.

== Whitewashing ==
Whitewashing refers to the phenomenon of non-white characters being portrayed by white actors or actresses. The term first gained prominence in 2010.

As an example, in the 2018 comedy blockbuster Crazy Rich Asians, the main character (Nick) was portrayed by a half-Asian actor (Henry Golding) instead of a 'full' Asian man. The portrayal of an Asian character by a man who has White ancestry has been criticized as a perpetuation of the stereotype that Asian men are not attractive or charismatic enough to be portrayed in leading male roles. Writer Nick Chen pointed out that it would be 'unthinkable' for Crazy Rich Asians to be re-written to cast a white female in the place of the Asian female lead.

The casting of fully white male actors in Asian fiction has also been criticized. For example, Matt Damon's role as the lead protagonist in the Chinese film The Great Wall was criticized by Constance Wu, who said that his casting perpetuated the idea that "only white men can save the world". Matt Damon himself defended his casting in the role, denying any allegations of whitewashing, which he said is an issue he takes seriously.

The 2012 film Argo was criticized by Latino actor Edward James Olmos for casting Ben Affleck, who is not Hispanic, in a Mexican-American leading male role. Olmos suggested that a number of Hispanic men could have been cast for the role, including himself as a viable choice.

According to Syler & Banks (2019), whitewashing has been criticized for three primary reasons. The casting of white actors in roles that depict non-white characters erases any potential benefit of cultural expertise that non-white actors may be able to offer. The use of white actors may lend itself to ethnic mimicry, which might give the film an inauthentic feel. Lastly, hiring white actors for non-white roles contributes to the massive disparity of representation and opportunity in media.

== Offending marginalized populations ==
One of the primary adverse effects of racial stereotyping in marketing is offending the population alluded to in an advertisement.

Researcher Srividya Ramasubramanian discusses how stereotypes become harmful, explaining that there are two stages in the stereotyping process, where activation is more automatic and application is more deliberate. She means essentially that stereotypical thoughts about other groups exist for all people implicitly, even if not acted upon or outwardly expressed. This argument suggests that all people believe in stereotypes to a certain degree, but only become offended when stereotypes are explicitly and openly stated.

Because people naturally identify themselves socially, they assign qualities to themselves that they can also associate with other people. Creating connections within a particular group increases the likelihood of experiencing hurt by stereotypical messaging present in advertisements, which "has a significant impact on the way the individuals within the group self-identify." Therefore, typical outcomes to offensive racial stereotypes are outrage at the producer of the advertisement or self-doubt within the group. Many believe that advertisements' archetypal representations of particular groups are unrealistic and distorted.

== Examples of racial stereotyping ==
Stereotypes directed at people of Asian descent represent well-educated individuals with a high work ethic. Commercials with these stereotypes tend to exist within advertising that promotes technology and business more than other races. Asian people were featured in ads that take place in the workplace or office setting in 50% of the print ads that they featured in, compared to other races that were featured in more leisure-oriented ads from 2003. Ads that feature Asian Americans often perpetuate a stereotype of success and sacrifice to achieve financial rewards, but some argue that the stereotype of hard work and affluence may appear to be a positive one, but is actually problematic. Indeed, stereotypes related to the false "Model minority" discourse have been proven to increase pressure on Asian people to be productive and successful. Television and print advertising shape viewers' perceptions of minorities, and many Asian and Asian-American journalists argue that this representation of Asian people hegemonizes and inaccurately represents a vast and convoluted group.

Stereotypes of Black people common in advertisements are a connection to hip-hop music. Black men in commercials also have exceptional physical and athletic ability, demonstrated by a young man playing basketball in a Kellogg's commercial or the variety of athletes in EA Sport's advertisements for basketball and soccer video games. Similarly, a typical representation for Black women is the "angry black woman" stereotype, where the woman is portrayed as irrational and violent. Other stereotypes may include the hypersexualization and dehumanization of Black people, as demonstrated through an ad by LINGsCARS that received complaints about trivializing the Black Lives Matter movement and stereotyping by playing off the offensive phrase "Once you go black, you never go back." The ad posted on Facebook read "Once you go black, you never go back" and "Black Cars Matter."

Latin American people are drastically underrepresented in the media, featured with speaking roles in only 1% of television ads and in only 4.7% of television ads overall in the early 2000s time period. In a study done by Mastro and Stern (2003) examining frequencies of different races in commercials, Latino people advertise soap or hygiene products in 43% of ads they are featured in, closely followed by other non-occupational roles promoting clothing or footwear. Paek and Shah found Latino populations to participate in advertisements that portrayed subservient and blue-collar labor roles. Additionally, advertisements featuring Latino people poke fun at accents, implement "Spanglish," and emphasize clichés.

== Campaigns against stereotypes ==
Some companies make efforts toward being culturally sensitive, but are not received well, such as Pepsi's advertisement featuring Kendall Jenner that was meant to highlight police brutality in the United States. Pepsi and Kendall Jenner both later apologized for the insensitive ad and it was taken down. Common complaints against the ad were that it was "co-opting protest movements for profit" and demonstrated the "white savior" trope in a way that trivialized the movement against police brutality.

An effort that was more positively received by society was the transition of PepsiCo's Aunt Jemima to Pearl Milling Company in 2021. Aunt Jemima was criticized for using stereotypical images and language to represent a Black woman as the "mammy" character. Based on Nancy Green, Aunt Jemima was a stereotypical representation of this woman who created the original recipe and served as the face of the brand for years. Dedicated to removing racial stereotypes, PepsiCo pledged a rebrand, a "$1 million commitment to empower and uplift Black girls and women," and a "five-year investment to uplift Black business and communities."

Another example of a commercial designed to combat racial stereotyping was the Procter & Gamble "Widen the Screen" ad. This ad was part of a "larger effort by the company to confront racial stereotypes in media and give opportunities to Black creators." Procter & Gamble created this campaign to emphasize statistics, including that "less than 6% of writers, directors, and producers of U.S.-produced films are Black," "only 8 of 1,447 directors identified as Black women" from 2007 to 2019, "black characters accounted for 15.7% of all film roles" in 2019, and "33% of the top 100 films in 2019 had no Black girls/women in any speaking or named roles." According to Procter & Gamble, their brand hopes to fight systemic racism and support Black creators.

== See also ==
- Gender advertisement
- Representation of African Americans in media
- Chimamanda Ngozi Adichie
