= Annoyance =

Unpleasant mental state

Annoyance is an unpleasant mental state that is characterized by irritation and distraction from one's conscious thinking. It can lead to emotions such as frustration and anger. The property of being easily annoyed is called irritability.

== Psychology ==
Various reasons exist for why one might find particular stimuli annoying. Measurement of annoyance is highly subjective. As an attempt at measurement, psychological studies on annoyance often rely on their subjects' own ratings of levels of annoyance on a scale. Any kind of stimuli can cause annoyance, for example getting poked in the side or listening to a song repeatedly. Many stimuli that one is at first neutral to, or even finds pleasant, can turn into annoyances from repeated continued exposure. One can often encounter annoyance factors in media, including popular music, memes, commercials, and advertising jingles, which by their nature are continually repeated over a period of weeks or months.

A study published in the International Journal of Conflict Management found that one's response to an annoyance, at least when the perceived cause is another person, escalate to more extreme levels as they go unresolved. It also found that one was more likely to blame the party who was causing the annoyance in the study, rather than one's self, for the annoyance as it escalated.

Psychological warfare can involve creating annoyances to distract and wear down the resistance of the target. For example, in 1993, the United States' Federal Bureau of Investigation (FBI) played music "specifically selected for its irritation ability" on loudspeakers outside the Branch Davidian church in Waco, Texas in an attempt to bring about the surrender of David Koresh and his followers.

== English law ==
In the sense of "nuisance", the noun "annoyance" is found in the English "Jury of Annoyance" appointed by an act of 1754 to report upon obstructions in the highways.

== See also ==
- Agitation
- Distraction
- Frustration
- Pet peeve
- Social alienation
