= Surreptitious advertising =

Secretive communication practices

Surreptitious advertising (stealth marketing) refers to secretive communication practices which potentially mislead the public about products or services. According to the EU's Television Without Frontiers (TWF) Directive, misleading representations of products are considered intentional "in particular if it is done in return for payment or for similar consideration."

== History ==
In the 1920s Edward Bernays resorted to surreptitious advertising for the American Tobacco Company (ATC): he discovered that women regarded cigarettes as phallic symbols of male power and therefore unsuitable for women. Hired by ATC president George Washington Hill, Bernays wanted to make smoking attractive to women. With the help of his secretary he employed a group of women, asked them to dress up like suffragettes on strike and sent them marching along New York's Fifth Avenue. When reporters started taking their pictures, the women lit cigarettes and proclaimed them "torches of freedom".
