= Pet peeve =

Minor annoyance that an individual identifies as particularly irritating

A pet peeve, pet aversion, or pet hate is a minor annoyance that an individual finds particularly irritating to a greater degree than the norm.

== Origin of the concept ==
The noun peeve, meaning an annoyance, is believed to have originated in the United States early in the twentieth century, derived by back-formation from the adjective peevish, meaning "ornery or ill-tempered", which dates from the late 14th-century.

The term pet peeve was introduced to a wide readership in the single-panel comic strip The Little Pet Peeve in the Chicago Tribune during the period 1916–1920. The strip was created by cartoonist Frank King, who also created the long-running Gasoline Alley strip. King's "little pet peeves" were humorous critiques of generally thoughtless behaviors and nuisance frustrations. Examples included people reading the inter-titles in silent films aloud, cracking an egg only to smell that it's gone rotten, back-seat drivers, and rugs that keep catching the bottom of the door and bunching up. King's readers submitted topics, including theater goers who unwrap candy in crinkly paper during a live performance, and (from a 12-year-old boy) having his mother come in to sweep when he has the pieces of a building toy spread out on the floor.

== Current usage and examples ==
Pet peeves often involve specific behaviors of someone close, such as a spouse or significant other. These behaviors may involve disrespect, manners, personal hygiene, relationships, and family issues. A key aspect of a pet peeve is that it may well seem acceptable or insignificant to others, while the person is likewise not bothered by things that might upset others. For example, a supervisor may have a pet peeve about people leaving the lid up on the copier, when others interrupt when speaking, or their subordinates having messy desks.
