= Wait marketing =

Wait marketing is a marketing strategy in which a company delivers a promotional message to a consumer while he or she is forced to wait for something else. These messages can include posters in buses and subways or video clips at fuel pumps.

This phrase was coined by Diana Derval. Although wait marketing has been used by businesses worldwide for years, Derval's works identified it as a key marketing tactic that is now consciously implemented on a regular basis.

The forms that wait marketing may take are varied and typically involve various other marketing strategies such as visual advertising and video. In some cases the target customer may be 'compulsory' to view the marketing material, and in others the company simply makes use of the increased perceptiveness and unoccupied time that is available when the potential customer is waiting.

An example of 'compulsory' wait marketing would be posters on the back of restaurant toilet doors, where the individual is facing the advert so directly they are almost compulsed to look at it. In other cases, marketing agents place ads in areas surrounding the waiting customer's attention, such as ads for food products surrounding the petrol pump, which the person may look at whilst waiting for their tank to fill up.

== Examples of wait marketing ==
Wait marketing strategy uses contexts such as customers sitting in the doctor's waiting room, traffic jams, or browsing social media platforms, waiting for public transport, or while standing in a queue. By facing waiting individuals with advertisements and marketing materials in these periods of activity intermission and mental attentiveness, businesses are able to capture the customer's attention at a time when they are more likely to concentrate on the content of the material.

People tend to look for instant gratification, and wait marketing feeds this need for occupation in periods of waiting. In public, this is a very powerful method used by companies to suggest other products to their customers - for example, in fast food restaurants advertising special meals in front of the ordering queue. However, it is also used in areas such as train stations to promote products that individuals may be interested in. When a customer is bored and waiting they are much more likely to pay attention to adverts they would otherwise have ignored - and this is the trick of wait marketing.

== Wait marketing online ==
An increasing number of businesses are now using wait marketing online as well as in public. A prime example of this is the recent addition of video adverts to the beginning of online video content. This is a form of 'forced' wait marketing, as the viewer has to watch the advert before they can view the video they want to see. Thus, they will see the product or service advertised and likely pay attention to it as they are waiting.

Another instance are landing pages, used by many businesses on their company websites and social media platforms. These are pop-up type boxes that appear over the web page encouraging the site user to follow them on a certain platform or sign up to their newsletter. Sometimes these are optional, and sometimes they are compulsory, where the user can only access the content if they follow the steps. This technique is often used to enable companies to keep in contact with their potential customers via their news feeds or email inboxes.

== See also ==
- Guerrilla marketing

== Sources ==
- Diana Derval (Author), David Gardener (Editor), and Vlad Kolarov (Illustrator), Is It The Right Moment For Wait Marketing?
