= Peggy (Discover Card) =

Advertising character

Peggy is a character used in ads for the Discover Card. In the ads, Peggy is a bearded man with a stereotypical Eastern European accent and a moth-eaten sweater. Peggy answers the phone for "USA Prime Credit," for whom he gives evasive or unhelpful customer service. He works in an unspecified frozen location, and his call center is a jumble of rubbish, outdated electronics, and stray personal effects.

The character of Peggy was created by The Martin Agency of Richmond, Virginia. He is played by actor Tudor Petrut, who was born in Romania and uses his native accent in portraying the character. On the agency's site, Peggy has given personal acknowledgments to several fans, up to and including voicing one fan's proposal to his girlfriend. The page's owners stopped maintaining the page in April 2013, having discontinued the character.

== Appearances ==
Peggy appears in 13 commercials, listed here:

- Transfer - Peggy is called by actress Lilli Birdsell, who asks for a supervisor after stating she's called three times. Peggy responds by saying, "Supervisor is genius, I transfer," then passes the phone between his coworkers, who all shout "Transfer" as they receive it and pass it to one another. When Peggy gets the phone back, Lilli yells in frustration, "Come on!" before weeping with her elbows on a concrete wall.
- Rewards That Make Sense - This woman calls Peggy to cash in reward points. "No more points, coupons now," Peggy responds, after which he tells her to convert coupons to tokens, which she then trades for credits. She interrupts him by saying, "And then I get the cash," but he tells her, "Then you call back," before hanging up the phone. Confused, the woman asks, "What just happened?"
- What Kind Of Program Is This? - This woman calls Peggy to redeem reward points towards a gift card. When she states she has 250,000 points, Peggy fiddles with an adding machine, before giving her answer, which turns out to be $5.50. He then takes back what's known as a "redemption charge," which leaves the woman with $0.50. "Happy time," Peggy says as another worker dings a small gong. Confused, the woman asks, "What kind of program is this?"
- How About Cash? - This man calls Peggy to ask about reward options for 100,000 points. Peggy responds by saying, "Many options; 1) keychain, B) trucker cap--look good for ladies." When the man asks about cash, Peggy responds by yelling to his coworkers, "He want cash!" All the coworkers laugh, and the man becomes confused.
- Herb Street: What Number? - ESPN's College Gameday analyst Kirk Herbstreit calls Peggy to cancel his USA Prime Credit card. When Peggy responds, "You make Peggy sad," Kirk explains the benefits of Discover Card. including cash rewards and being accepted in more places. When Kirk says his name, Peggy responds by asking for a number on "Herb Street." Kirk declines the question, saying "Herbstreit is my last name," before again denying a number on "Herb Street." The commercial ends with Peggy asking again and Kirk taking a deep breath to try not to lose his temper.
- Patrick Kane - "The hotel says my card is maxed out--it can't be," NHL ice hockey player Patrick Kane says when he calls Peggy to complain. When he states his name, Peggy asks him how he scored from the left side. As Patrick tells him, Peggy says, "Hold please," before playing at a hockey table. A buzzer sounds, and Peggy pretends he's in a crowd of thousands of people congratulating him for a victory. "Peggy, I can hear you," says Patrick.
- Boston Cab - NHL ice hockey goalie Tim Thomas calls Peggy to complain. "Yes, it's a common problem," Peggy responds, to which Tim states he's in a Boston cab. "Just place card carefully in envelope and send to Peggy," says Peggy, "We fix. Three weeks." Tim asks for help, but Peggy says again, "Three weeks." When Tim tells his name to the cab driver, she denies it, and pulls down her ceiling visor showing a picture of another so-called "Tim Thomas" wearing a helmet. The commercial ends with Tim repeatedly whispering "Peggy" as he ducks his head in the backseat.
- Annual Fee - This man calls Peggy to complain about a $35 annual fee. When Peggy says "Yes," the man asks if it's a mistake. When Peggy says "Yes" again, the man asks if Peggy is saying the word or asking it like a question. When Peggy says "Yes" once more, the man tries to get Peggy to answer the questions about the fee. Soon Peggy hangs up on him.
- Please Hold - Peggy says a few words to his coworkers in some foreign language, before answering the phone with a man who states he's been waiting for a representative to answer the phone for 15 minutes. "You are tenacious like bull. I like," says Peggy, "Please hold!" The man yells "No no no no no, Pegg..." Peggy admires the blinking lights on his telephones, as the man listens to the Red Army Choir hold music.
- Dad Gum - Florida State Seminoles football team coach Bobby Bowden calls Peggy to complain about charges for a pet shop. When asked if "that sounds like a man who'd have five dad gum charges," Peggy fakes a static noise by wiggling a crushed piece of paper to the phone's microphone, and says, "You break up, call back next week!" When Peggy hangs up, Bobby says, "I'm not too old to find you, son."
- Retraining Program - This man calls Peggy to cancel his USA Prime Credit Card, He explains the benefits of Discover Card, including cash rewards and being accepted in more places. As an older woman with an eye patch approaches with a puppet holding a baseball bat, Peggy says, "If I lose a customer, I must take a retraining program," to which the man replies, "Come on, retraining can't be that bad." When a whipping sound and Peggy screaming are heard on the phone, the man says, "Ooh, bad."
- Do You Believe In Yourself? - College football coach Lou Holtz calls Peggy to order a replacement card after losing his original one. "One month," says Peggy. Lou says, "Do you believe in yourself? I believe in you too, Peggy. You could be my go-to guy. Or girl. Now stand tall and get out there and replace my card!" Peggy responds, "You inspire me. Three weeks!" The commercial ends with Lou saying, "Okay, let's start over."
- Stanley Cup Final - This man tries to take a plane to Chicago for the Stanley Cup Final. He calls Peggy to complain about a problem with his card. When he's told he didn't pay his bill, the man tells Peggy he did pay it a week prior to calling. Peggy says, "We must have computer problem, hold please," before hanging up to play a game of chess. The commercial ends with the man deciding to take a bus.
