= Mobile phone content advertising =

Promotion of mobile phone services

Mobile phone content advertising is the advertising that is delivered through mobile phones and devices, such as smartphones, tablets, and laptops. Previously aligned with the promotion of ringtones, wallpapers, and SMS subscription services, mobile phone content advertising now applies to in-app ads, webpage ads, social media campaigns, video ads, push notifications, and content sponsored with creators. This type of advertising depends on target audiences, location-based services, and personalized ads, all of which rely on the device, app, and browsing behavior.

== History ==
The first easily customizable aspect of the mobile phone were the operator logos – small, monochrome images that show the logo of the mobile network operator by default. These were often replaced by a person's name or a small symbol.

As handset manufacturers introduced better ring tones and audio capabilities, the ring tones became the most common method of customizing one's phone. Web sites containing ring tones of popular songs and tunes started appearing, with many of them providing the service free of charge and with little or no advertising at all. Because of this, their popularity grew mainly through word of mouth. However, these sites soon started charging a small fee for the privilege.

Some companies started large mass media campaigns to advertise the fact that they had the latest tunes and largest collections of ring tones. One of the biggest advertisers was the German company Jamba! (known as Jamster! in some countries), who was known for the Sweety the Chick and Crazy Frog ringtone characters. After months of public complaints, the British Advertising Standards Authority (ASA) ruled on 21 September 2005 that many of the advertisements must be shown only after 9 p.m. The primary intention of this was to prevent the company from targeting young people in its campaigns.^{[1][2]}

== Trends ==
With smartphones and mobile devices on the rise, advertising has shifted from SMS-based promotions to analytical, app-based, and platform-dependent campaigns. This type of advertising is usually seen in social media platforms, short form content, mobile games, streaming services, and webpages.

A significant trend in the advertisement industry is the use of personalized ads, which are constructed based on user demographics, browsing behavior, apps utilized, types of device, and location. Researchers have been able to demonstrate how both app, time, and location-based targeting works in online communities.

Another major trend is the rise of social media and creator-based campaigns. In the United States, both search, social media, and video formats have been identified as the largest mobile advertising formats, showing how mobile devices contribute to media consumption.

While the rise of mobile advertising has allowed for mass consumption of ideas and products, it has also brought up concerns of privacy, specifically in the use of location data and tracking. Due to rising concerns, the U.S. Federal Trade Commission implemented an order that restricts the sale and sharing of precise location data by the digital marketing firm, InMarket.

== Contemporary Formats ==
In today's advertising industry, formats include in-app advertising (banner ads, ads within applications), webpage advertising, social media advertising, short-form video advertising, sponsored content and influencer campaigns, and location-based advertising. According to the Pew Research Center, 91% of adults in the United States own a smartphone, hence why the shift to mobile phone content advertising has shifted dramatically.
