= Ling's Cars =

Car dealership in England

LINGsCARS
- Type: Privately held company
- Founder: Ling Valentine
- Headquarters: Newcastle upon Tyne, United Kingdom
- Website: lingscars.com

LINGsCARS.com (stylized as LINGsCARS) is a car dealership in Newcastle upon Tyne, England. The dealership is most notable for its peculiar website.

== History ==
Ling's Cars was founded by Ling Valentine, a Chinese businesswoman. Ling was born in Chengdu, China, and moved to the United Kingdom during the 1990s. Ling best describes herself as a "scruffy Chinese girl". The company was founded in 2000 by Ling and her husband Jon out of their living room. By 2006, it was reported that they were doing more than £1 million a month in sales, with a profit of £100,000 for 2005. In 2007, Ling Valentine appeared on the BBC reality show Dragons' Den. In 2013, Ling Valentine moved to Grange Villa from her previous home in Low Fell. On October 21, 2020, Ling announced that she would be retiring from the motor industry as she plans to cycle around the world. At this time her staff took the reins and are still in business today.

== Website ==
The website of Ling's Cars has been dubbed "the weirdest website on the internet". The website featured karaoke and online games, as well as a shop and an FAQ. During a 2014 interview, Ling claimed that she wanted to "stand out in a sea of 'same again' car leasing websites".

In February 2025, the website was redesigned, removing animated elements and subduing the background pattern. A cut-back version of the original website is now hosted at https://museum.lingscars.com/. Certain pages such as Scalextric have been removed from the navigation but can still be accessed via direct links.

== Controversies ==
Ling's Cars has had a number of feuds with the Advertising Standards Authority. In 2013, the ASA contacted Ling's Cars over an advertisement in which the dealership claimed to sell a DMC DeLorean model from 1982. In 2018, the ASA banned another advert from the dealership over usage of the phrase "bum boys", and in June 2020, the dealership posted an advertisement on Facebook that carried the phrases "Black Cars Matter" and "Once you go black, you never go back.", amid the height of the George Floyd protests. The ad received complaints and was soon banned by the ASA.
