= Dusty the Dusthole =

Nevada air quality advertising campaign

Dusty the Dusthole bumper sticker 2003

Dusty the Dusthole was a Clark County Department of Air Quality & Environmental Management mascot created in 2003 in Las Vegas, Nevada. The character and his trademark slogan "Don't Be a Dusthole" were seen by millions of residents and tourists in the state of Nevada via a massive media push consisting of billboards, radio ads, public appearances, TV spots, and print coverage.

== Background ==
In 2003, in response to the threat of federal funding loss due to unacceptable levels of dust pollution in the Las Vegas Valley (which then were in violation of United States Environmental Protection Agency policy), the "Dusty" character and its associated campaigns were created by Nevada-based agency Thomas Puckett in conjunction with the Clark County, Nevada Department of Air Quality & Environmental Management.

The character was portrayed by lifelong Las Vegas resident Alan Burd, who died in January 2024. In the campaign's opening years, Burd was a common sight at various fairs and functions as the Dusty character.

Within three years the campaign succeeded in raising awareness of dust and its serious contribution to the Las Vegas Valley air pollution issue. $1.2 million in dust violations and other pollutant-related fines were channeled to the local school district during the period.

Within a decade, the EPA declared the Las Vegas Valley "clean," meeting US federal standards for airborne dust particles. The "Don't Be a Dusthole" campaign—by then retired—was cited as a positive contributing factor, and Henderson Home News declared the Dusthole character "(not) such a bad guy after all".
