= Informative advertising =

Advertising carried out in a factual manner

Informative advertising is advertising that is carried out in a factual manner. This form of advertising relies solely on the goods or service's strengths and features, rather than trying to convince customers to buy a product using emotion. The use of emotion in advertising is classified as persuasive advertising. Information advertising is mainly used for two purposes; to augment market power, and to inform customers of goods and services, prices, and sales conditions.

== Features ==
There are three main features of informative advertising.

=== Accurate information ===
Accurate information and data must be used when advertising informatively. Before ads are presented to customers, all facts and figures of the advertisement should be verified and authenticated. Accurate information helps to gain user trust and build a large customer base.

=== Updates and innovations ===
Industries with constant upgrades and improving products, such as the telecommunications sector and the automobile industry, can engage audiences and inform of updates or expansions through the use of informative advertising.

=== Use of local data ===
Informative advertising will differ between companies, depending on their size. A global company selling a homogenous good or service will have the same data and figures throughout their advertising, even if the form or look of the advertisement differs depending on geographic location. In comparison, a global company offering a slightly heterogeneous product depending on geographic location will be able to present ads with differing facts.

== Reasons ==
Alongside promotional reasons, there are other reasons why informative advertising is used.

Under certain circumstances, a business may be required to run informative advertising due to legal requirements. Some industries have much stricter advertising laws than others, the tobacco industry is one of the more notable examples. For example, in Australia, tobacco is not allowed to be advertised in a manner which persuades users to buy, smoke or use it. They are also required to include health warnings.

Pharmaceutical companies are also required to give extensive and accurate information on products. This information includes ingredients, side effects and contraindications. In the United States, pharmaceutical companies are allowed to advertise to prescription medicines to consumers, which resulted in a 36% increase of consumers asking health professionals about certain medication between 1987 and 1992. In Australia, the promotion of prescription drugs to the public is not permitted.

Governments often use informative advertisements for a range of purposes such as health updates, alcohol and drug use statistics, election data, and tourism.

== See also ==
- Advertorial – Advertisement disguised as editorial
- Informative – Facts provided or learned about something or someone
- Public service announcement – Message in the public interest communicated widely
- Advertising – Form of communication for marketing
