= Street team =

Group of people who promote events or products on the street

A street team is a term used in marketing to describe a group of people who engage with urban or campus communities to promote events. They are particularly prevalent in the music industry, which uses street teams for grassroots marketing and to promote awareness for artists and bands.

== History ==
The now ubiquitous "street team" model was originally developed by urban record labels, such as: Loud Records, Jive, Bad Boy Records, Roc-A-Fella Records, Priority Records, and Ruthless Records. Rap labels found it affordable and highly effective bridge to their target audience that did not require the traditional outlets found in print, radio, television mediums and elusive large scale record distribution deals. One of the first independent rock bands to introduce a version of the street team was Chicago folk-rockers the Drovers, who launched a "campus rep" initiative in 1991 for the college rock club circuit, copying practices used by the Mondale presidential campaign to activate registration and turnout at universities.

This grassroots tactic was partly born in the mid-1990s from the larger monopolistic record distributors trying to shut out rap and smaller music labels of the day from radio and mass distribution due to the early stigma of gangsta rap and "punk" on those genres as a whole.

Street Teams were used by smaller independent record labels as a tool to circumvent the larger out-of-reach distributors and corporate owned record labels. Other independent label owners used street teams as a way to build equity in their stable of artists for the benefit of gaining a courtship by a larger music label or record distributor to merge or sell part or all of the company. (see Loud Records sale late 1990s)

For the smaller labels trying to get in the door of the music business, the thinking was in part to build a loyal fan base in key markets first, getting a strong street hype and "street-cred," getting on the local radio stations through the hype/word-of-mouth, and moving on to the larger record distributors with a much stronger negotiating hand and a solid "sellable" commodity.

Through this method of building a solid fan base with disposable income first, the smaller label could wield greater power in their initial distribution negotiations for the benefit of their recording artists and their profit margins. Often, distribution deals for an "unproven" new artist(s) who comes with a built-in fan base, generally receive better upfront money deals than music artists had previously received without street teams sharing the music and spreading the word, (viral marketing) nationwide.

=== Street teamers ===
The position of street team representative was often filled by fans of an artist or young people looking for an introductory position in the music industry. In many cases, an influential teen referred to as a neighborhood "tastemaker" was sought out or pinpointed by a record label to be used as a conduit to their respective neighborhood, due to their stronger influence over other teens that looked to them for "what's hot" or "what's the next hot thing". The tastemaker was directed to create a team on the streets to make an unsigned music artist more popular through word-of-mouth and hype.

The concept for organized promotion teams in the music business can also be traced back to mid-1970s, when Starkey and Evans, two teenage Kiss fans from Terre Haute, Indiana created the Kiss Army as a group of fans determined to promote the Kiss name. Although this could be more attributed to fan clubs, fans worked together outside of their homes, to promote Kiss to other kids at school or while hanging out. This Kiss army was quickly taken over by the band Kiss itself and army recruits were offered limited edition merchandise and seating.

Usually unpaid, street teams for bands and artists are still often composed of teenagers who are rewarded with free band merchandise or show access in exchange for a variety of actions:

- placing stickers and posters in their communities
- bringing friends to the shows
- convincing friends to buy band merchandise
- phoning the local radio stations to request their songs for airplays & voting in the charts
- bringing vinyl and CDs to local DJs in the clubs where they work
- posting to band internet forums online

In some cases, points are assigned to an individual for a particular action, and those points can be exchanged for tickets to shows, or for band merchandise. Some bands even produce special items just for street team members.

== See also ==
- Street marketing
- Fan labor
