= Anxiety threshold =

Level of anxiety that will affect a person's performance

An anxiety threshold is the level of anxiety that, when reached, can affect a person's performance. Anxiety is an emotion, similar to fear, that can be created by insecurities in one's abilities, concerns for the future, such as financial or situational circumstances, or past memories of frightening experiences. Anxiety can affect all age groups and if fears are irrational, it may cause mental disorders. An individual's anxiety threshold can be measured by the amount of anxiety consistently manifested from situation to situation.

Sub-threshold anxiety traits can be mild, atypical, or masked and therefore present a negative result for tests such as the Diagnostic and Statistical Manual of Mental Disorders (DSM). These sub-threshold symptoms are therefore often overlooked as early signs of more serious anxiety disorders. Social anxiety disorder is one of the most frequent anxiety disorders. Both threshold and sub-threshold social anxiety disorders are associated with a higher risk for many other disorders. Anxiety sensitivity is a characteristic that can be described as the fear of anxiety. Anxiety sensitivity is an integral factor in the development and maintenance of anxiety. A panic attack can be induced when an anxiety threshold is reached.

== Statistics ==
Anxiety disorders are the most common mental illness in the U.S., affecting 40 million adults in the United States age 18 and older, or 18.1% of the population every year. According to the Anxiety and Depression Association of America, anxiety disorders are highly treatable but only 36.9% of people receive treatment. Anxiety doesn't limit itself to adults, as 25.1% of children age 13-18 are affected by it. Anxiety in children and teens can lead to being distracted easily, missing out on social events, and substance abuse. According to the World Health Organization(WHO), 1 in 13 people in the entire world are affected by anxiety. Typically, those who suffer from Anxiety orders also suffer from Depression, vice versa. Out of the people that have been diagnosed with Depression, almost 50% have also been diagnosed with some sort of Anxiety Disorder. Everyone with Anxiety disorders has an anxiety threshold, but not everyone reaches it.

== Symptoms ==
There are 3 key symptoms to look out for that someone may be reaching their anxiety threshold:

=== Physical ===
Panic attacks, hot and cold flashes, racing heart, tightening of the chest, quick breathing, restlessness, or feeling tense, wound up and edgy, irritability, restlessness, difficulty concentrating, and a snowball effect of fear and worry over time. Some other physical symptoms can range from feeling shaky or dizzy to the feeling of butterflies in the stomach, as well as having aches in the back and neck regions. When a panic attack ensues, a rush of intense anxiety and fear along with frightening thoughts and physical feelings occur. This can cause to person to have thoughts that include, "I'm going to die.", "I'm having a heart-attack.", "This isn't going to stop.", and "I can't breathe." In that moment, it can be terrifying for the person experiencing these thoughts and feelings and it can feel like an eternity for the person going through it, but it's important to recognize that they will pass. Panic attack are usually short and last about 10 minutes.

=== Psychological ===
Excessive fear, constant worry, catastrophizing, or obsessive thinking. These fears can take over and make things seem as though they are out of control, this is the same for the constant worry. Sometimes these worries may seem irrational or they don't make sense and they may take over and cause problems with concentrating.

=== Behavioral ===
Avoidance of situations that cause anxiety, which can have an impact on study, work or social life. Other signs are withdrawing from friends and family, not being able to control worries about things not in their control, the inability to relax or get to sleep quickly, and getting irritated quickly.

== Performance ==
Performance is a huge factor affected by anxiety thresholds and their treatments. There are many different ways that an individual can experience performance changes.

- There can be problems with medication that cause adverse side effects. This can include things like drowsiness and fatigue to blurred vision and hand tremors. There are many more side effects to medication that can affect performance including dry mouth/thirst and slowed response times.
- Can cause problems in blocking out sensory stimuli that can interfere in the ability to focus on tasks. It can become overwhelming with loud noise and crowds.
- Concentration becomes difficult to sustain. Increased restlessness and a shortened attention span can affect the ability to understand or remember what others say. Individuals become easily distracted as well.
- Maintaining stamina: difficulty sustaining enough energy to spend a whole day of classes on campus; combating drowsiness due to medications.
- Handling time pressures and multiple tasks: difficulty managing assignments, prioritizing tasks, and meeting deadlines. Inability to multi-task work.
- Interacting with others: difficulty getting along, fitting in, contributing to group work, and reading social cues.
- Fear of authority figures: difficulty approaching instructors or teaching assistants.
- Responding to negative feedback: difficulty understanding and correctly interpreting criticism or poor grades. May not be able to separate person from task (personalization or defensiveness due to low self-esteem).
- Responding to change: difficulty coping with unexpected changes in coursework, such as changes in the assignments, due dates, or instructors. Limited ability to tolerate interruptions.
- Severe test anxiety: such that the individual is rendered emotionally and physically unable to take the exam.

== Causes ==
There are many different things that can cause someone to reach their anxiety threshold. Emotional, physical, and mental exhaustion caused by excessive and prolonged stress can all be contributing factors. In addition, anxiety threshold occurs when feeling overwhelmed, emotionally drained, and unable to meet constant demands. As the stress continues, people may begin to lose the interest and motivation that led them to take on a certain role in the first place and they start drawing themselves in and not let people know how they feel and bottle up their feelings only causing more stress to themselves.

- Media
- Genetics
- Work
- School
- Illness
- Drug Abuse
- Toxic Relationships
- Emotional Trauma
- Medication Side Effect
- Respiratory Disorders
- Stress
- Heart disease
- Diabetes
- Thyroid problems
- Irritable bowel syndrome or chronic pain
- Tumors that can cause fight-or-flight hormone responses
- Past or childhood experiences: emotional and physical abuse, neglect, loss of a parent, or being bullied and socially excluded
- Not meeting expectations from yourself or others
- Your current life situation: exhaustion, stress building up, loss of work, bills, debt, pressure to perform at work, and possibility of losing a loved one

== Management ==
A wide variety of treatment options are available for Anxiety Disorders. A few include, but are not limited to; Therapy, Medication, Complementary and Alternative Treatment, and Transcranial Magnetic Stimulation.

=== Medications ===
- Anti-Depressants
- Buspirone
- Benzodiazepines

=== Home Remedies ===
Lifestyle is often the focus of understanding and treating anxiety. The following are examples of common remedies for anxiety that focus on lifestyle and behavior over medication and professionally-guided therapy.

- Be physically active. Having a routine to follow can help stay active throughout the week. Staying active throughout the week can be a great way to relieve stress and improve mood. This exercise doesn't need to be strenuous. It can start out easy and slowly increase in intensity. It's best to get at least two and a half hours of moderate exercise in each week or one hour and 15 mins of intense activity each week. Moderate exercise could include anything that is not high intensity like brisk walking. Intense exercise could include things like swimming laps or jogging. It can also be a combination of both, but that isn't needed if trying to manage anxiety.
- Get enough sleep. This means waking up and feeling rested. Sometimes people will experience problems with sleeping, if this is the case, consult your doctor.
- Do things that help you relax. There are many techniques that can help reach relaxation. Things like meditation or yoga are just some of the techniques used.
- Eating healthy. This has some evidence to reduced anxiety. Eating healthy involves focusing on the main food groups like fruits and vegetables as well as protein and whole grains.
- Avoid drugs and alcohol. Consuming these can cause adverse reactions that affect anxiety.
- Avoid smoking or caffeine. Caffeine is found in things like coffee and soda. Smoking and caffeine can have a negative effect on anxiety.
- Journaling. Journaling allows a person to write down all of their thoughts, worries, and feelings in a safe space. Studies have shown show that journaling can help individuals understand their true self more clearly and assist them in gaining control of confusing emotions.
- Sunlight. The sun does great things for your overall well-being. Some ways that the sun helps your physical and mental health are; increased Vitamin-D, improved mood, higher quality sleep, stronger bones, and lowered blood pressure. All of these examples can decrease anxiety symptoms.
- Try to understand that things are not always in your control and that's okay. Try to take another perspective to see if what is causing the anxiety is really something that needs to be worried about.
- Stay positive. If you catch yourself thinking negatively try to focus on things you are grateful for or that you find beautiful. Try to change those negative thoughts to positive thoughts.
- Be open to humor. Having a bit of laughter in life can help a lot when managing anxiety.
- Figure out what is causing your anxiety in certain moments. Like mentioned before, keeping a journal can help. In this journal, write down the things that are causing you to feel anxious. Over time, look for a pattern to what makes you anxious.
- Involve yourself. Being involved in the community can create a sense of unity. It also create a space for support, which can then give release from stress.
- Have someone to talk to. Having people in life that are trusted and loving can help when dealing with anxiety. Let them know what is happening in life that causes these feelings of anxiety and what they can do to help. If this isn't enough, seek professional help from a therapist or doctor.

== Measures of anxiety ==
There are 2 sub-scales used to measure anxiety; the State Anxiety Scale, and the Trait Anxiety Scale. The S-Anxiety Scale evaluates the current state of anxiety, while the T-Anxiety Scale evaluates aspects of "anxiety proneness", including general states of calmness, confidence and security. Both of these scales are measured on a 1-4 scale, the S-Anxiety scale being not at all-moderately and T-Anxiety scale being almost never-almost always. These scales are used to measure triggers of anxiety and levels of anxiety experienced. Results vary per person, as each individual experiences anxiety in different ways.

=== Types of Anxiety ===
- Agoraphobia
- Generalized anxiety disorder
- Separation Anxiety Disorder
- Social anxiety disorder
- Specific phobias
- Selective Mutism
- Panic disorder

==== Disorders Where Anxiety is Present ====
- Obsessive–compulsive disorder
- Posttraumatic stress disorder
