= Surround sessions =

Surround sessions are advertising sequences in which a visitor receives ads from one advertiser throughout an entire site visit.

Recently introduced by the online unit of the New York Times, the "surround session" is creating a major buzz in the online advertising community. The session model represents a potentially significant shift in the way advertisers view online media, as more emphasis is placed on the real interaction between advertisers and audiences.

== Process ==
In a surround session, an advertiser has all or most of the ads on each page for a visitor's entire site visit. As the visitor moves from page to page, the same advertiser is represented in various ad placements. This could allow for reinforcement of an advertiser's message, or possibly the creative use of a story line across several pages.

As currently proposed, an advertiser only pays for sessions that reach a predetermined amount of pageviews, and does not pay for any views in short sessions or the extra views in long sessions. The number of guaranteed page views per session is likely to vary, depending on what buyers are looking to purchase and what publishers are able to deliver.

== Impact ==
The move to a session-based model might even give new life to beleaguered metrics such as the click-through rate. Many marketers equate a 1% click-through rate with only 1 in 100 visitors clicking on an advertisement. At best, this assumption is slightly imprecise... at worst, it is grossly inaccurate.

For example, assume that a particularly "sticky" site averages 11 page views per visitor and a 3% click-through rate. This means that up to 33% of the audience could have responded to the advertisement, assuming no duplicate clicks.

Perhaps most significantly, the surround session is one of the first advertising ideas in recent times that does not further degrade the user experience. This new method of packaging ads does not require longer download times, more screen space, or annoying browser tricks.

== See also ==
- Advertising column
- Advertising inventory
- Contextual advertising
