= Advertising clutter =

Concept in marketing

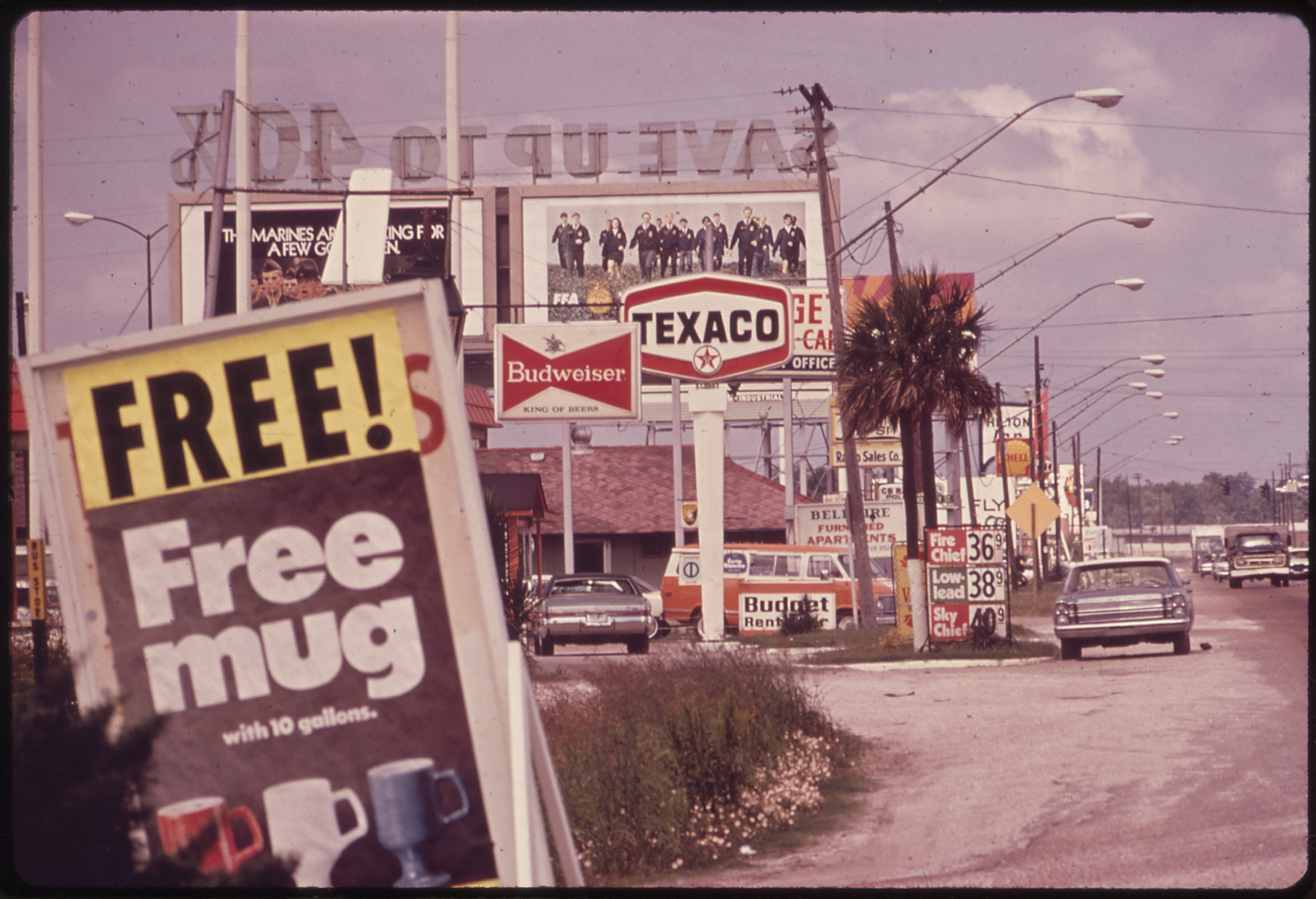
Billboard clutter in Texas, 1972

Advertising clutter or marketing clutter refers to the large volume of advertising messages that the average consumer is exposed to on a daily basis. It can occur in television, radio, print media, direct mail and online advertising. Clutter may be assessed objectively, through the number of advertisements or the proportion of advertising content, or subjectively, through the amount of advertising that audiences perceive as excessive.

Researchers have examined advertising clutter from both media-centred and audience-centred perspectives. The media-centred approach focuses on the amount and placement of advertising, while the audience-centred approach considers how advertising interferes with a person’s use of a medium. Consequently, a large number of advertisements does not always produce the same response: their format, position, similarity and degree of disruption can influence how clutter is perceived.

== Background ==
Advertising clutter has traditionally been studied as competition among advertising messages for limited audience attention. In television and radio, it can be measured through the amount of commercial time or the number of advertisements appearing during a programme. In magazines and newspapers, measurements may include the number of advertisements or the proportion of pages devoted to them. Online environments also require consideration of interactive and interruptive advertising formats.

The distinction between the actual amount of advertising and perceived clutter is important. A cross-media survey of 946 consumers covering television, radio, magazines, newspapers, direct mail and the Yellow Pages found that perceptions differed substantially by medium. Television and direct mail received the highest perceived-clutter ratings, while television and magazines produced the greatest reported disruption and difficulty in locating desired content.

== Effects on consumers and media ==
Perceived advertising clutter has been associated with less favourable attitudes toward advertising and greater advertising avoidance. These effects vary between media because audiences use television, radio, publications and online services for different purposes and encounter advertisements in different ways. An advertisement may be considered disruptive when it interrupts content or makes desired information more difficult to find.

Research into the effect of clutter on advertising memory has produced mixed results. Earlier research suggested that crowded television advertising environments could reduce consumers’ ability to recall advertised brands. However, experiments comparing recognition, aided recall and unaided recall found that clutter might not significantly reduce a viewer’s underlying ability to remember an advertisement. The apparent effect can therefore depend partly on the method used to measure memory.

Advertising clutter can also affect the media organizations that sell advertising space. Research examining consumer magazines found that high levels of clutter were associated with negative circulation returns. The study also found diminishing advertising-revenue returns when the amount of advertising exceeded a magazine’s historical levels, suggesting that continually adding advertisements does not necessarily produce proportional financial gains.

== Online advertising clutter ==
In online media, advertising clutter can include numerous display advertisements, repeated advertising messages and formats that interrupt navigation or access to content. Unlike audiences of some traditional media, internet users frequently enter a website with a specific task, such as locating information, reading an article or completing a transaction. Advertising may therefore be perceived as clutter when it obstructs or delays that task.

Research into internet advertising avoidance has identified perceived goal impediment, perceived advertising clutter and previous negative experiences as important factors. These factors can lead users to avoid advertisements cognitively, by ignoring them; affectively, by developing negative reactions; or behaviorally, by scrolling past, closing or otherwise avoiding advertising content. In one influential study, perceived interference with a user’s objective was the strongest of the three factors.

The effects of online clutter are not uniform across formats or measurements. An experiment involving 250 participants and simulated news websites found that the frequency with which banner advertisements appeared influenced memory, attitudes and behavior. Banner clutter itself did not significantly affect recall, attitudes or behavior in that experiment, although it negatively affected advertisement recognition. These findings indicate that the number of advertisements and the frequency of exposure can produce different effects.
