= Event marketing =

Use of events to promote a product

Event marketing is the experiential marketing of a brand, service, or product through memorable experiences or promotional events. It typically involves direct interaction with a brand's representatives. It should not be confused with event management, which is a process of organizing, promoting and conducting events. Trade shows are an example of event marketing.

== Overview ==
Event marketing is considered to be a part of experiential marketing and content marketing. Experiential marketing follows the process of corporate storytelling, (Note: As described in: Petrucci, Anthony (20 November 2017). "Storytelling Takes Corporate Communications To The Next Level". Forbes.) and aims to further engage the audience. Experiential follows a simple formula of combining a brand's message and interactive components. This mode of marketing places the target audience in a live environment that will encourage the desired outcome.

Event marketing mostly relies on emotions and the activity of the human brain. Event marketing uses emotions and is based on the fact that people remember what they are experiencing. Emotional stimulus significantly affects the image of the offered service or product. Psychologists proved that while stimulated by emotions, the brain remembers certain facts and pieces of information better. Experiencing something makes it more memorable. In this condition, it is more likely that the brand will stay in the receiver's mind and create a long-lasting image.

In a thesis for the International Business and Economics Programme at the Luleå University of Technology, Jessica Eriksson and Anna Hjälmsson wrote:

Event marketing is marketing through events, where marketing is seen as central and the event is considered the actual marketing tool. Event marketing is focusing on a target group and involves high contact intensity. It turns a message into an event that can be experienced by the audience. Several senses are engaged, which increases the chances to remember the experience and thereby also the message.

Event marketing can also function purely as a business-to-business (B2B) opportunity, whereby experiential emotions are not a factor in the event, but rather, the event serves as an opportunity to make business contacts and network with customers. The American Marketing Association (AMA) defines marketing as "Marketing is the activity, set of institutions, and processes for creating, communicating, delivering, and exchanging offerings that have value for customers, clients, partners, and society at large."

For Preston, it is not necessary that an event is marketed as a thing in itself. Rather, events marketing may be seen as "a means of marketing things," such as products and services.

== Event marketing worldwide ==
The term "event marketing" became an important part of study in German, American, British, and Canadian markets. Event marketing had been considered equal to the promotion of an event in order to increase the sales of the tickets and was forgotten as a form of marketing.

This conception changed with excessive studies in the late-20th and early-21st century. Philip Kotler's Marketing, which was published at the beginning of the century, is regarded as the first step to a clear definition of the term. It was later followed by a Danish publication Events as a strategic marketing tool written by Dorothe Gerritsen and Ronald van Olderen. Event marketing became recognized as a marketing tool, especially in Poland when it was introduced in the early 2000s. (Jaworowicz P., Jaworowicz M., Event marketing w Zintegrowanej Komunikacji Marketingowej, Warszawa 2016.) Polish academics mostly relied on Western studies and managed to build up the whole concept.

According to The US Bureau of Labor Statistics, the event industry will grow by 44% from 2010 to 2020. A plurality of marketers (31%) believe event marketing to be the single-most effective marketing channel, with 27% voting on Content Marketing, and 25% on Email Marketing.

HubSpot has highlighted 11 experiential marketing campaigns by globally renowned brands such as Facebook, Google, Zappos, and Guinness, showcasing how these companies have hosted or created events as innovative methods of advertising their products. Each of them was successful and attracted thousands of new customers. Marketing Insider Group has also listed 5 event marketing examples that are still being talked about. Among them, The Kia Dream Chute is mentioned as one of the best ideas. All of those events are considered one of the best marketing campaigns in the world.

A study made by Jack Morton Worldwide shows that 11 out of 14 consumers prefer to get to know new products or services by experiencing them personally.

Moreover, 74% of consumers say that connecting with branded event marketing experiences is making them more likely to buy the products which are being promoted, according to research done by The Event Marketing Institute and Mosaic.

== Event marketing strategy ==
Event marketing strategy is a tailor-made plan to promote a brand/product with events as an advertising tool. This includes an in-depth analysis of plans for the brand's presence at events.

In order to measure the success of event marketing, the brand impact has to be verified. Based on an analysis made by the Advertising Research Foundation (ARF) in March 2006, engagement is "turning on a prospect to a brand idea enhanced by the surrounding context". There was also a function created to show the impact on a brand: Engagement + Trust x Targeted Group = Brand Impact.
