= Jay Conrad Levinson =

American business writer (1933–2013)

- Died: October 10, 2013
- Occupations: Business writer, advertising executive
- Writing career
- Notable work: Guerrilla Marketing (1984)

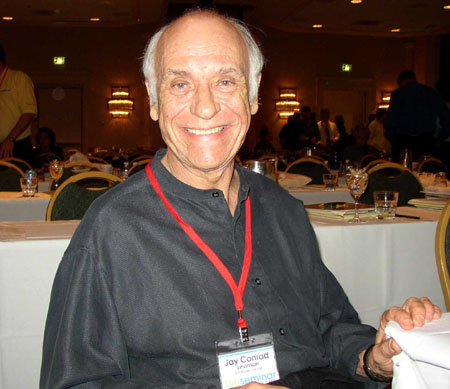
Jay Conrad Levinson in 2006

Jay Conrad Levinson (February 10, 1933 – October 10, 2013) was an American business writer, known as author of the 1984 book Guerrilla Marketing.

He was born in Detroit, raised in Chicago, graduated from the University of Colorado. His studies in Psychology led him to advertising agencies, including a Directorship at Leo Burnett in London, where he served as creative director. Returning to the US, he joined J. Walter Thompson (now known as JWT) as Senior Vice President. Jay created and taught guerrilla marketing for ten years at UC Berkeley Extension.

== Work ==
As an advertisement agency executive some notable marketing campaigns and achievements Levinson collaboratively developed include the Marlboro Man, the Pillsbury Doughboy, Allstate's good hands, United Airlines “Fly the friendly skies” slogan, the Sears Diehard battery, Morris the Cat, Tony the Tiger, and the Jolly Green Giant.

He was the founder of the international Guerrilla Marketing Association, coach and specialist author of many books on the subject of guerilla marketing, which have appeared in many languages. The first to use the term "guerrilla marketing" describing 'unconventional' marketing tools used in cases when financial or other resources are limited or non-existent. His first book Guerrilla Marketing was published in 1984 and has been named by Time as one of the top 25 best business books, with over 21 million sold. His guerrilla concepts have influenced marketing so much that his books appear in 62 languages.

== Selected publications ==
Books:

- Levinson, Jay Conrad. Guerrilla Marketing Excellence: The 50 Golden Rules for Small-business Success, 1993.
- Levinson, Jay Conrad. The guerrilla marketing handbook, 1994.
- Levinson, Jay Conrad. Guerrilla marketing: Secrets for making big profits from your small business. Houghton Mifflin Harcourt, 1998.
