= Guerrilla marketing =

Unconventional advertising strategy

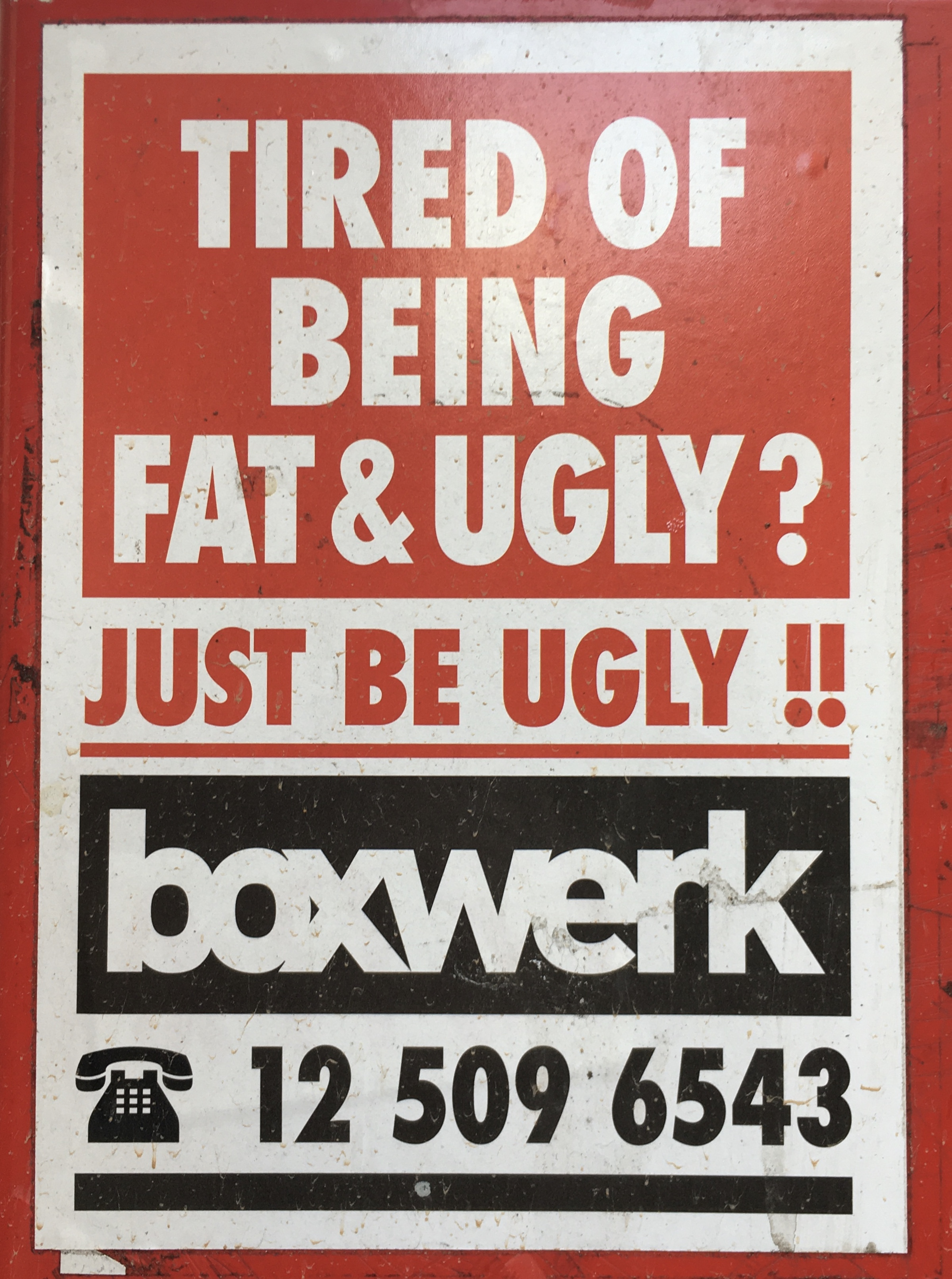
Ad sticker of a boxing studio in Germany. The message is ironic and can be regarded as "anti-typical" for advertisements, as it is basically negative.

Guerrilla marketing is an advertisement strategy in which a company uses surprise and/or unconventional interactions in order to promote a product or service. It is a type of publicity. The term was popularized by Jay Conrad Levinson's 1984 book Guerrilla Marketing.

Guerrilla marketing uses multiple techniques and practices to establish direct contact with potential customers. One of the goals of this interaction is to cause an emotional reaction in the clients, and the ultimate goal of marketing is to induce people to remember products or brands in a different way than they might have been accustomed to.

As traditional advertising media channels—such as print, radio, television, and direct mail—lose popularity, marketers and advertisers have felt compelled to find new strategies to convey their commercial messages to the consumer. Guerrilla marketing focuses on taking the consumer by surprise to make a dramatic impression about the product or brand. This in turn creates buzz about the product being marketed. It is a way of advertising that increases consumers' engagement with the product or service, and is designed to create a memorable experience. By creating a memorable experience, it also increases the likelihood that a consumer, or someone who interacted with the campaign, will tell their friends about the product. Thus, via word of mouth, the product or service being advertised reaches more people than initially anticipated.

Guerrilla marketing is relatively inexpensive, and focuses more on reach rather than frequency. For guerrilla campaigns to be successful, companies generally do not need to spend large amounts of money, but they need to have imagination, energy and time. Therefore, guerrilla marketing has the potential to be effective for small businesses, especially if they are competing against bigger companies.

The message to consumers is often designed to be clear and concise. This type of marketing also works on the unconscious mind, because purchasing decisions are often made by the unconscious mind. To keep the product or service in the unconscious mind requires repetition, so if a buzz is created around a product, and if it is shared amongst friends, then this mechanism enables repetition.

== Etymology and origin ==
The term "guerrilla marketing" is traced to guerrilla warfare, which employs atypical tactics to achieve an objective. In 1984, the term guerrilla marketing was introduced by Leo Burnett's creative director Jay Conrad Levinson in his book Guerrilla Marketing. The term itself was from the inspiration of guerrilla warfare which was unconventional warfare using different techniques from usual and small tactic strategies used by armed civilians. Because the key goal is to manipulate consumers into talking about the product or brand via social media platforms, significant imagination and energy is required in order to capture the attention of sufficient numbers of people. This is especially the case when one considers that, with other firms competing for people's attention, there can be significant "clutter" in the environment that the consumer is forced to deal with daily.

Guerrilla marketing is popular for small or medium-sized businesses who have tight budgets. But the same tactics have also been used by large companies trying to differentiate themselves from competitors via social media campaigns. Similar marketing tactics have also been used by individuals seeking employment.

Guerrilla marketing has also evolved to include street marketing, which itself has evolved to encompass activities beyond the everyday realm of urban streets and thus now includes newer promotional methodologies. Examples include mass-printed flyers and animated digital signage.

== Types ==
=== Ambient marketing ===
Ambient communication is advertising presented on elements of the environment, including nearly every available physical surface. It is a compilation of intelligence, flexibility, and effective use of the atmosphere. These kinds of ads can be found anywhere and everywhere from hand dryers in public bathrooms and petrol pumps through to bus hand straps and golf-hole cups.

=== Ambush marketing ===
Ambush marketing is a form of associative marketing, used by an organization to capitalize upon the awareness, attention, goodwill, and other benefits, generated by having an association with an event or property, without that organization having an official or direct connection to that event or property.

This form of marketing is typically seen at major events where rivals of official sponsors attempt to build an association with the event and increase awareness for their brands, sometimes covertly. For example, during the 2012 London Olympics, footwear maker Nike created 'find your Greatness' spots where they featured athletes from several locations called London (but without showing the real London or referring to the Olympic games). This was intended to build a strong association between the London Olympics and Nike.

=== Stealth marketing ===
Stealth marketing is a type of surreptitious advertising in which a product or service is promoted in a way that is intended to draw attention without appearing to be promotional. This often involves a popular social media account seemingly unaffiliated with the advertiser such as an influencer or news account, appearing to post about it organically in their own style but with the subject being exclusively the company or marketing campaign being promoted and only talking about the subject positively, without explicitly disclosing the post as an advertisement. The account does not disclose that they accept advertising nor offer advertising services publicly.

This is intended to increase revenue by displaying apparent authenticity, thus aiming to eliminate consumer friction or refusals found when presenting disclosed advertising, by aiming to use the same trust as consumer-to-consumer Word-of-mouth marketing (WOM) but differs from it by being under direct control of the advertiser as a planned, one-time advertising post on an account, without relying on consumer loyalty and bypassing social media platforms' advertising platforms, potentially leading to lower upfront investment and wider reach. In some countries, these practices are widespread among locally popular social media accounts and may be combined with Astroturfing campaigns and this type of advertising post can also be ordered repeatedly by the same advertiser. This type of advertising can constitute a significant fraction of an account's revenue.

=== Viral marketing ===
Viral marketing describes any strategy that encourages individuals to pass on a marketing message to others (often via online social-media platforms), creating the potential for exponential growth in the message's exposure and influence. Like viruses, such strategies take advantage of rapid multiplication to explode the message to thousands, to millions. Off the Internet, viral marketing can be referred to as "word-of-mouth".

=== Buzz marketing ===
Similar to viral marketing, buzz marketing uses high-profile media to encourage the public to discuss the brand or product. Buzz marketing works best when consumer's responses to a product or service and subsequent endorsements are genuine, without the company paying them. Buzz generated from buzz marketing campaigns is referred to as "amplified WOM" (word-of-mouth), and "organic WOM" is when buzz occurs naturally by the consumer.

=== Grassroots marketing ===
Grassroots campaigns aim to win customers over individually. A successful grassroots campaign is not about the dissemination of the marketing message in the hope that possible consumers are paying attention, but rather highlights a personal connection between the consumer and the brand, and builds a lasting relationship with the brand.

=== Astroturfing ===
Astroturfing is among the most controversial guerrilla marketing strategies, and it has a high risk of backfiring for the company marketing the product or service. Astroturfing derives from artificial “turf”, often used in stadiums or tennis courts – also known as fake grass. Hence, fake endorsements, testimonials and recommendations are all products of Astroturfing in the public-relations sector. Astroturfing involves generating an artificial hype around a particular product or company through a review or discussion on online blogs or forums by one or more individuals who are paid to convey a positive view yet who does not reveal their true motivation. Astroturfing may also be done similarly on social media to support a product. This can have a negative and detrimental effect on a company, should the consumer suspect that the review or opinion is inauthentic and manipulative of public opinion. The result is damage to the company's reputation, and possibly litigation. It has also been used to attempt to shift public opinion by posing mining as an ideological stance and thus supporting mining activities by directly or indirectly making relationships between mining and societal issues, even over months and posing a single mine as mining and thus its restart as an ideological or political stance. Astroturfing has also been used in election campaigns.

=== Street marketing ===
Street marketing uses unconventional means of advertising or promoting products and brands in public areas. The main goal is to encourage consumers to remember and recall the brand or product marketed. As a division of guerrilla marketing, street marketing is specific to all marketing activities carried out in streets and public areas such as parks, streets, and events. Street marketing also encompasses advertising outdoors, such as on shopping trolleys (shopping carts, in the US), public toilets, sides of cars or public transport, manhole covers, footpaths, rubbish bins, etc.

Street marketing is not confined to fixed print-form advertisements. It is common practice for organizations to use brand ambassadors who distribute product samples or discount vouchers, and answer queries about the product while emphasizing the brand. The brand ambassadors may be accompanied by a kiosk containing product samples or demonstration materials, or wearing a "walking billboard". The physical interaction with consumers has a greater influencing power than traditional passive advertising.

Street marketing is understood as mobilizing not only the space of the streets but also the imagination of the street: that of street culture and street art. Young urbanites are often put forth as the most susceptible target for these campaigns due to their associations with the culture of the street.

According to Marcel Saucet and Bernard Cova, street marketing can be used as a general term encompassing six principal types of activities:

- Distribution of flyers or products, this activity is more traditional, and is the most common form of street marketing employed by brands.
- Product animations, this consists of personalizing a high-traffic space using brand imagery. The idea is to create a micro-universe in order to promote a new product or service.
- Human animations, the goal of such actions is to create a space in which the brand's message is communicated through human activity.
- Road shows, this form of mobile presentation is based on the development of means of transport: taxi, bike, Segway, etc.
- Uncovered actions, these activities involve the customization of street elements.
- Event actions, these activities take the form of spectacles, such as flash mobs or contests. The idea is to promote a product, service, or brand value through organization of a public event.

== Typical procedure ==
First, corporations identify the public places where the campaign can be developed such as beaches, cultural events, close to schools, sporting events and recreation areas for children. Next, companies have to develop a plan to get close to different media and the target market. In order to attract attention, street marketing events not only involve unusual activities, but use technology as part of the events. The purpose is to increase the value of the campaigns and get potential consumers' attention.

Companies develop plans taking into account that the global communication and interaction involved in guerrilla or street marketing is not limited to customers or the media. They are also developed to identify opportunities and collect enough information about products, markets and competitors. For businesses, it is important that customers stay with them, instead of choosing the competitors’ offers. They implement innovative strategies with which they will not lose position in the market, and they consider supplementation with other advertisement through other mediums, such as radio and television, when using street marketing.

When a company decides to do a guerrilla marketing campaign which could be anything out of viral, ambient, ambush, street or stealth, the focus for them is to meet the objectives. The main objectives for them are:

- To create enough buzz to serve in word-of-mouth, helping the brand to establish well with its products
- To touch most of the five sensory identities of the customer/consumer, enhancing personal experience with the brand and building a good reputation
- To reach the target successfully by taking the brand to them in their daily routine

Through the experience and the ephemeral feelings shared between the company and the target, advertisers and agencies generate a feeling of intimacy that resonates beyond the encounter. This feeling of nearness becomes all the more lasting as the affected individuals relive this encounter on the internet through social media.

== Strategy ==
The guerrilla marketing promotion strategy was first identified by Jay Conrad Levinson in his book Guerrilla Marketing (1984). The book describes hundreds of "guerrilla marketing weapons" in use at the time. Guerrilla marketers need to be creative in devising unconventional methods of promotion to maintain the public's interest in a product or service. Levinson writes that when implementing guerrilla marketing tactics, smaller organizations and entrepreneurs are actually at an advantage. Ultimately, however, guerrilla marketers must "deliver the goods". In The Guerrilla Marketing Handbook, the authors write: "...in order to sell a product or a service, a company must establish a relationship with the customer. It must build trust and support the customer's needs, and it must provide a product that delivers the promised benefits..."

== Online guerrilla marketing ==
The web is rife with examples of guerrilla marketing, to the extent that many people don't notice its presence - until a particularly successful campaign arises. The desire for instant gratification of internet users provides an avenue for guerrilla marketing by allowing businesses to combine wait marketing with guerrilla tactics. Simple examples consist of using 'loading' pages or image alt texts to display an entertaining or informative message to users waiting to access the content they were trying to get to. As users dislike waiting with no occupation on the web, it is essential, and easy, to capture their attention this way. Other website methods include interesting web features such as engaging landing pages.

Many online marketing strategies also use social media such as Facebook and LinkedIn to begin campaigns, share-able features and event host events. Other companies run competitions or discounts based on encouraging users to share or create content related to their product. Viral videos are an incredibly popular form of guerrilla marketing in which companies film entertaining or surprising videos that internet users are likely to share and enjoy, that subtly advertise their service or product. Some companies such as Google even create interactive elements like the themed Google logo games to spark interest and engagement. These dynamic guerrilla marketing tactics can become news globally and give businesses considerable publicity.

== Examples ==
There are various organizations that have implemented guerrilla and street marketing strategies. The majority of them are small companies, but there are also big companies that have been involved in the guerrilla and street marketing environment. Most of the examples of the strategies that both small and big enterprises have put into action include costumed persons, the distribution of tickets, and people providing samples, among others. As stated before, one guerrilla marketing conventional method that is used by many businesses is to provide fliers. The goal is to create awareness to customers about what the enterprise is doing. One example of this took place in Montpelier, Vermont, where the New England Culinary Institute (NECI) sent a group of students to a movie theatre to hand out 400 fliers. The fliers had coupons in which NECI was inviting people to go to its monthly Theme Dinners. Another company, Boston's Kung-Fu Tai Chi Club, chose the option of disseminating fliers instead of placing its advertisements in newspapers. The purpose of the fliers was to promote the company's self-defence classes for women.

Other businesses apply the technique of sending disguised people to promote things on the streets. For example, Match.com organized a street marketing activity in the “Feria del Libro” (“Book Fair”) in Madrid. It consisted of a man dressed like a prince who was walking among the crowd looking for his “real love”. He had a glass slipper and even got to try the shoe on some people. A woman behind him was giving bookmarks to the people which contained messages such as “Times have changed; the way to find love, too” or “You have been reading love stories all your life; experience yours on Match.com”. Also, in Madrid and Barcelona, Nokia developed a campaign called “Avestruz” (“Ostrich”) to promote the 5500 and 5700 mobiles. In the campaign, a group of real-size ostrich puppets tried to interact with young people in order to let them know these mobiles provide a high-quality MP3 playback. The puppets were holding their own telephones and listening to the music. When a young person appeared, the puppet tried to catch his/her attention to show him/her the quality of the mobile. The reason why Nokia decided to use ostriches was that they are big animals, so people could easily look at them.

There are enterprises that disseminate passes or tickets to different events. For example, Sony invests on joining promoters and tells them that they have to infiltrate in public meetings. What they have to do is to distribute free tickets to concerts and other musical events sponsored by the company. Another instance is the Spanish company Clickair (an extension of Iberia Airlines), that developed a campaign in which a group of five people had to walk through Barcelona streets dressed as Euros. The group was supplying approximately 3,000 tickets to promote different Clickair destinations. The people who first sent a text message with the required information would get free tickets to go on a trip. In the end, the company received a total of 3,390 messages.

Along with these examples, there are other street-marketing techniques that are even more unusual. Lee Jeans, a French company dedicated to the selling of jeans, promoted the opening of their new store in rue des Rosiers in Paris. The method they applied consisted of distributing denims, as well as denim accessories, on the different streets of the neighborhood. Furthermore, in Italy, the members of the company Nintendo put into action a campaign in which they used post-its to promote the Wii console. They pasted several post-its with the shapes of some characters from different video games. Those images were placed as if they were billboards on the streets. “Wii not forget”, the name of the campaign, and a brief explanation of it, were the words written on the post-its.

Sony Ericsson used an undercover campaign in 2002, spearheaded by Jonathan Maron, when they hired 60 actors in ten major cities and had them accost strangers and ask them: "Would you mind taking my picture?" The actor then handed the target a brand new picture phone while talking about how cool the new device was. In this way, an everyday activity was converted into a branding event.

Guerrilla marketing is not exclusive to small companies. For big companies it is a high risk, high reward strategy. When successful, it can capture additional market share, but if it fails it can damage the company's brand image. One successful guerrilla marketing campaign is the Coca-Cola ‘Happiness Machine”. In January 2010, Coca-Cola, with the help of Definition 6, filmed a reaction video of a Coke vending machine dispensing ‘doses’ of happiness to unsuspecting students in St. John's University. A seemingly normal vending machine surprised students by dispensing items that were more than they bargained for. The students received items ranging from extra Coke, pizza, flowers, to even a twelve-foot hero sub. “Coke’s goal to inspire consumers through small, surprise moments of happiness” said Paul Iannacchino Jr., Creative Director, Definition 6. With a budget of only $60,000, the video generated 500,000 views in the first week. It now has over 7 million views to date. The campaign was so popular that a 30-second edit of the footage was featured during American Idol's 19th season. The Coca-Cola “Happiness Machine” also went on to receive the CLIO's prestigious Gold Interactive Award at the 51st annual awards dinner held in New York City. After the campaign's success, Coca-Cola decided to continue with the ‘Happiness’ theme and has released similar videos since then.

== Strategic risk ==
Because of the nature of guerrilla marketing, the message and objective must be clearly defined in order to avoid being misunderstood. Misinterpretation by the targeted audience of the message intended to be promoted is a risk. Word-of-mouth advertising does not always remain sufficiently focused to present the intended message. The rumor-like spread of word-of-mouth marketing is uncontrollable once released, and can result in a misrepresentation of the message or confusion about a brand.

Another risk involves wrongly timed (or wrongly placed) events, which may actually be perceived to be against the interests of the consumer. For instance, in an ill-conceived promotion which took place on January 31, 2007, several magnetic circuit boards—each with an flashing LED cartoon figure—were attached to metal surfaces in and around Boston, Massachusetts to promote the animated series, Aqua Teen Hunger Force. The circuit boards were mistakenly taken for explosive devices. Several subway stations, bridges, and a portion of Interstate 93 were closed as police examined, removed, and (in some cases) destroyed the devices.

Some guerrilla marketing may incite the ire of local authorities. Then risks are assessed and may still be considered worthwhile. Such was the case in Houston, Texas, when BMW Auto's ad agency, Street Factory Media, attached a replica of a Mini-Cooper (made of Styrofoam), to the side of a downtown building in January 2013. For the small cost of a city-issued fine, the company received front page advertising in the Houston Chronicle.

Another problem presents itself if marketers fail to properly execute an undercover campaign. They run considerable risk of backlash. An example of this can be found in Sony Entertainment's on-line debacle with Zipatoni. The company attempted to promote Zipatoni through a stealth marketing campaign, which was quickly detected by the internet community, resulting in Sony immediately experiencing a backlash from video game enthusiasts.

Street art is thus a subversive activity, hijacking public places and inventing rather paradoxical forms of expression that reformulate ways of communicating, all of which inform street marketing practices. Thus marketing in the street, given that it is inspired by the work of such artists, brings with it constraints and statutory risks for which agencies and advertisers are generally not prepared. The main problem is that, by definition, street mobilization campaigns require the use of public space, and that use must be authorized by government authorities to be legal. This is just as true for simple operations like distributing flyers as it is for mobilizing products or people and, of course, for a disguised campaign.

The authorizations necessary to carry out such a campaign are often very difficult to obtain within the time allotted for bringing the plan to fruition. Numerous potential operations have failed to obtain authorization for safety reasons, and in certain urban areas it is even expressly forbidden to undertake a guerrilla marketing campaign. In such cases, many agencies and advertisers will simply go ahead with the operation, meaning that they choose to act without authorization. How is such a choice reached, and on what bases? How is it justified? What impact does this choice have on the performance and costs of the operation? What transformations does this choice bring to the agency–advertiser relationship? These are the main questions posed in the development of street marketing operations today.

== Inexpensive costs ==
In a declining economy, guerrilla marketing is an increasing solution to giving companies the comparative edge over others. During times when companies are downsizing and cutting costs, companies look to guerrilla marketing as a cheaper strategy than conventional marketing. Instead of investing money in the marketing process, guerrillas invest energy, time and creativity. If done successfully, companies will be able to reach conventional goals for profits and growth with a smaller marketing budget. One such example is the Blair Witch Project. A group of film students filmed an amateur horror movie. By setting up an internet campaign devoted to spreading rumors about the fictitious 'Blair Witch', it created a lot of interest for the film. With a budget of $50,000, the movie grossed $250 million worldwide.

According to Jay Levinson, guerrilla marketing emphasizes strongly on customer follow-up rather than ignoring customers after their purchase. Focusing on customer follow-up is a cheaper strategy because the cost of selling to a new customer is six times higher than selling to an existing customer. During a tough economy, it is important to focus on building relationships rather than sales, and aiming at individuals instead of groups. This promotes repeat sales, referrals and increased size of purchase. The use of telephone as a follow-up tool is helpful in improving customer relationships. Email is also another inexpensive tool for maintaining relationships. Emails can be used to direct people to the company website. The site can be then used to provide information and to advance sales.

== See also ==
- Customer experience management
- Earned media
- Marketing ethics
- Mobile marketing

== Sources ==
- Bach, Benjamin (2007). An Investigation into the Relevance of Guerrilla Marketing to Small and Medium-Sized Enterprises. Munich: GRIN Verlag. ISBN 9783638874052.
- Serazio, Michael (2013). Your Ad Here: The Cool Sell of Guerrilla Marketing. New York: New York University Press. ISBN 9780814724590.
