= Advertising =

Form of communication for marketing

Two forms of advertising at Piccadilly Circus, London in 2014: LED signs advertising services and products, and an illuminated London Underground sign advertising an entrance to the city's metro system

Advertising is the practice and techniques employed to bring attention to a product or service. Advertising aims to present a product or service in terms of utility, advantages, and qualities of interest to consumers. It is typically used to promote a specific good or service, but there is a wide range of uses, a traditional form being the commercial.

Commercial advertisements often seek to generate increased consumption of products or services through "branding", which associates a product name or image with certain qualities in the minds of consumers. Advertising that intends to elicit an immediate sale is known as direct-response advertising. Non-commercial entities that advertise include political parties, interest groups, religious organizations, and governmental agencies. Non-profit organizations may use free modes of persuasion, such as a public service announcement. Advertising may also help to reassure employees or shareholders that a company is viable or successful.

Worldwide spending on advertising was estimated to be over US$1 trillion in 2025. Advertising's distribution for 2024 was 59.4% on digital, 24.9% on TV, 5.2% on out-of-home, 4.5% on radio, 3.5% on newspapers, 2.2% on magazines and 0.4% on cinema. Internationally, the largest advertising agency groups in 2025 were Omnicom, Publicis and WPP.

== History ==
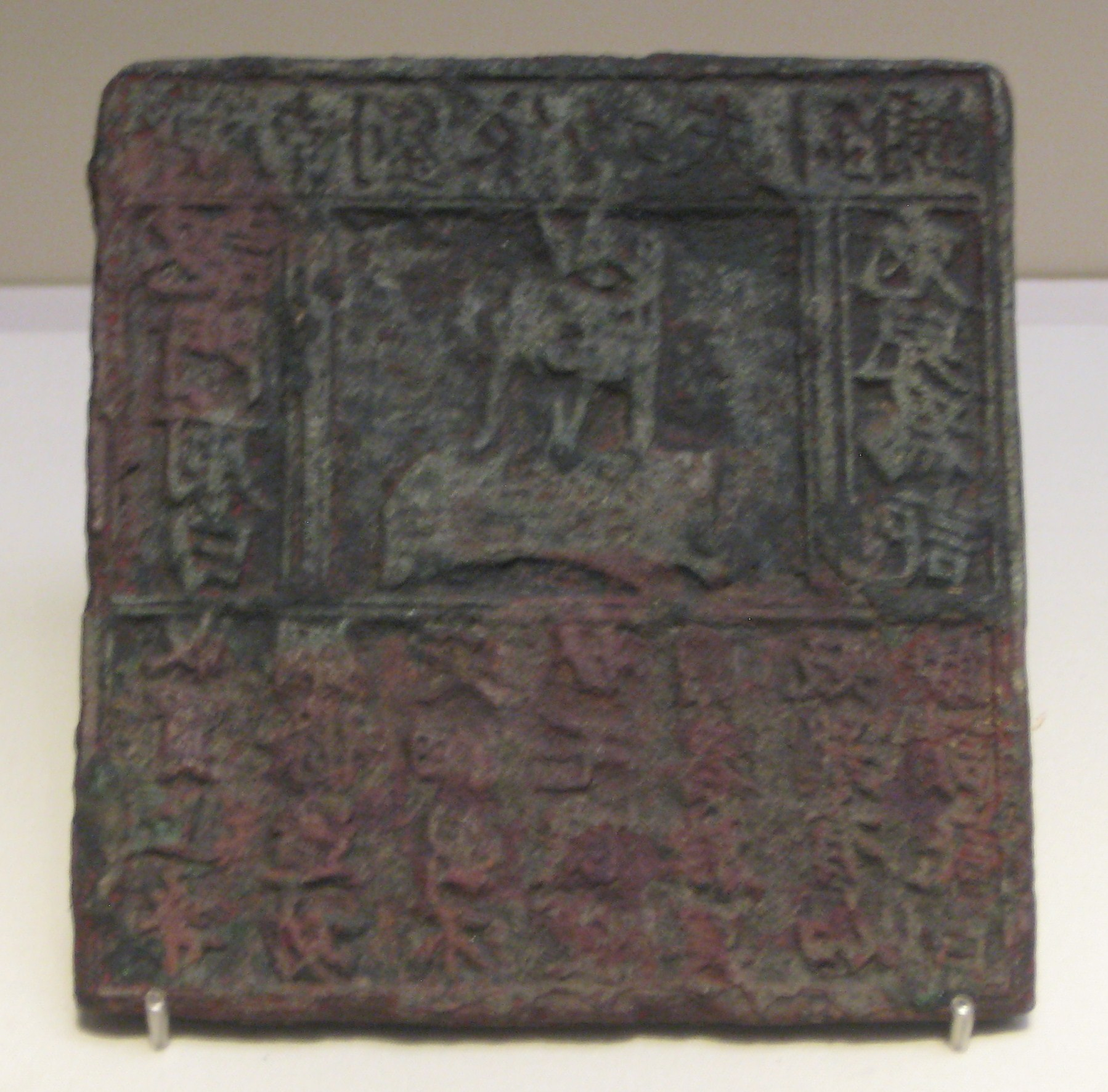
Bronze plate for printing an advertisement for the Liu family needle shop at Jinan, Song dynasty China. It is the world's earliest identified printed advertising medium.

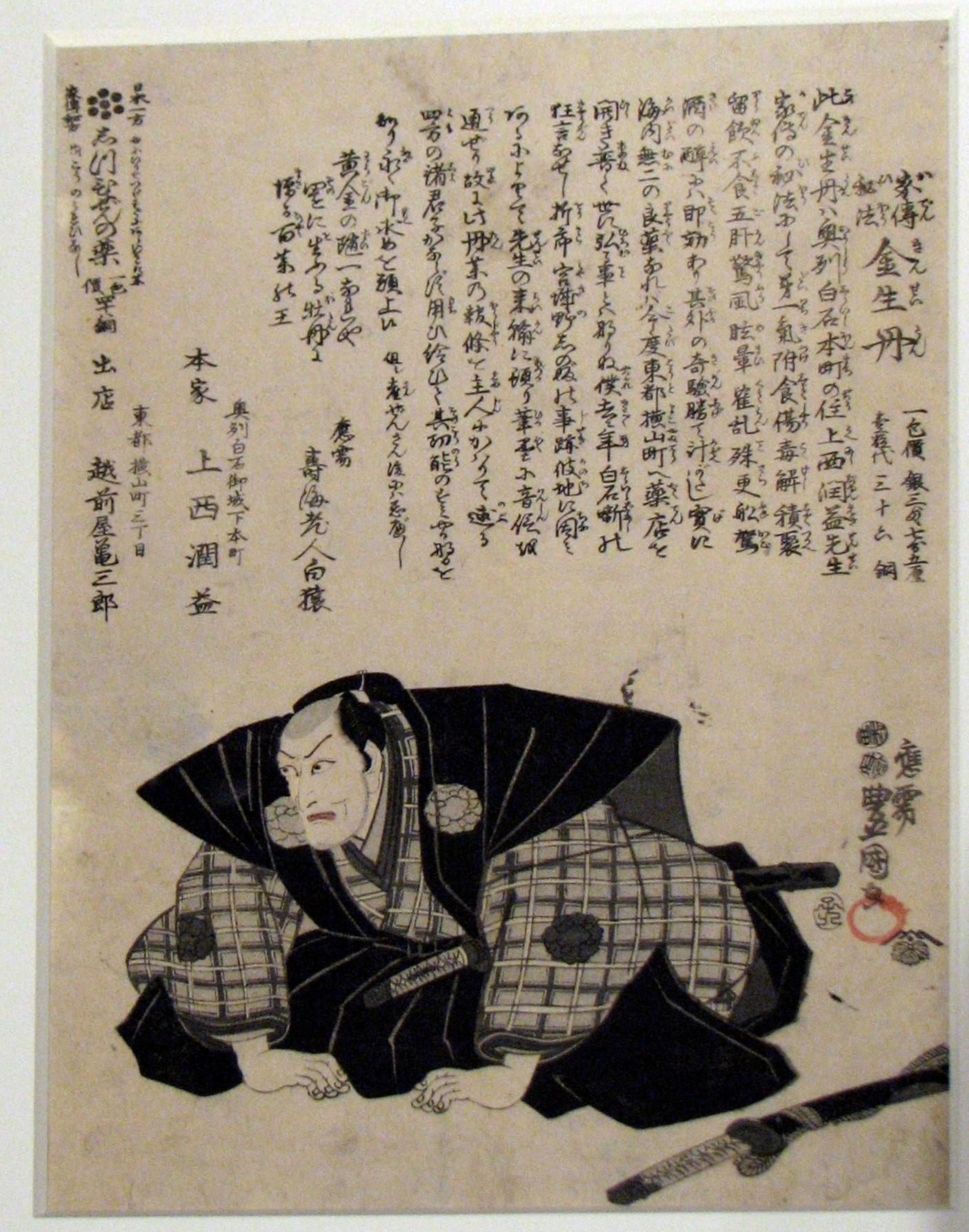
Edo period LEL flyer from 1806 for a traditional medicine called Kinseitan

Egyptians used papyrus to make sales messages and wall posters. Commercial messages and political campaign displays have been found in the ruins of Pompeii and ancient Arabia. Lost and found advertising on papyrus was common in ancient Greece and ancient Rome. Wall or rock painting for commercial advertising is another manifestation of an ancient advertising form, which is present to this day in many parts of Asia, Africa, and South America. The tradition of wall painting can be traced back to Indian rock art paintings that date back to 4000 BC.

In ancient China, the earliest advertising recorded was in the Classic of Poetry (11th to 7th centuries BC) which describes bamboo flutes playing to sell confectionery. Advertising usually took the form of calligraphic signboards and inked papers. A copper printing plate dated to the Song dynasty era was used to print posters in the form of a square sheet of paper with a rabbit logo, that included the copy "Jinan Liu's Fine Needle Shop" and "We buy high-quality steel rods and make fine-quality needles, to be ready for use at home in no time" written above and below, and is considered to be the world's earliest identified printed advertising medium.

In Europe, as the towns and cities of the Middle Ages began to grow, and the general population was unable to read, instead of signs that read "cobbler", "miller", "tailor", or "blacksmith", images associated with their trade would be used, such as a boot, a suit, a hat, a clock, a diamond, a horseshoe, a candle or a bag of flour. Fruits and vegetables were sold in the city square from carts and wagons and their proprietors used street callers (town criers) to announce their whereabouts. The first compilation of such advertisements was gathered in "Les Crieries de Paris", a thirteenth-century poem by Guillaume de la Villeneuve.

=== 18th-19th century: Newspaper Advertising ===
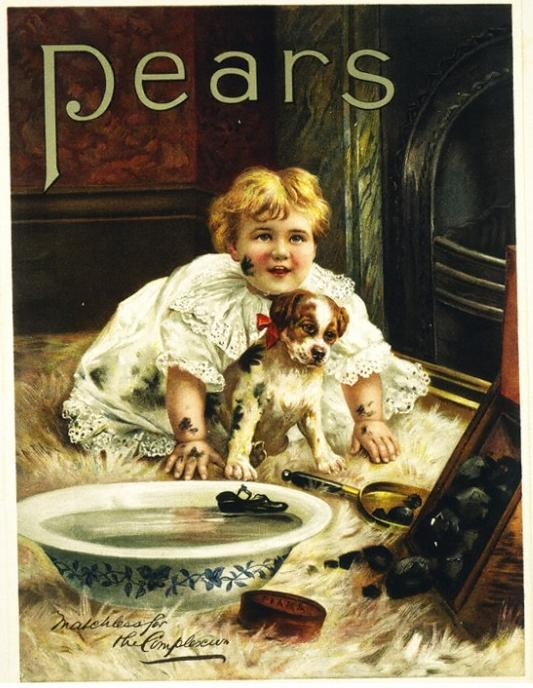
Poster for Pears soap created under Thomas J. Barratt's leadership, 1900. Victoria and Albert Museum, London

By the end of the 18th century in England, the circulation of newspapers had increased and advertising accounted for a significant proportion of newspaper content. As a result the word 'advertiser' began to be used in newspaper names/titles. Prior to the 19th century, most advertisements were for books or medicines. At this time, advertisements rarely used images.

In the United States, newspapers grew quickly in the first few decades of the 19th century, in part due to advertising. By 1822, the United States had more newspaper readers than any other country. About half of the content of these newspapers consisted of advertising, usually local advertising, with half of the daily newspapers in the 1810s using the word "advertiser" in their name.

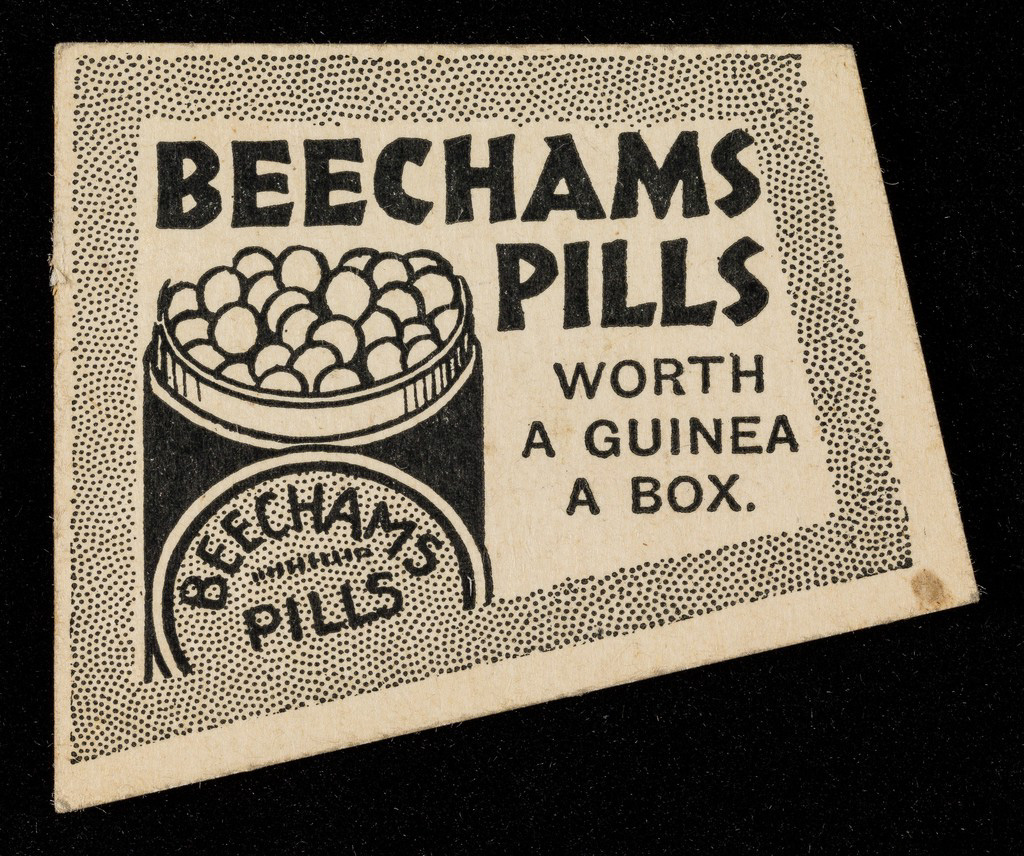
"Beechams Pills: Worth a guinea a box", the first advertising slogan from August 1859

In August 1859, British pharmaceutical firm Beechams created a slogan for Beecham's Pills: "Beechams Pills: Worth a guinea a box", which is considered to be the world's first advertising slogan. The Beechams adverts would appear in newspapers all over the world, helping the company become a global brand. The phrase was said to be uttered by a satisfied lady purchaser from St Helens, Lancashire, the founder's hometown.

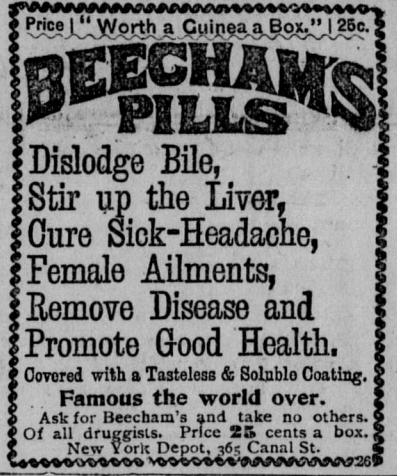
Beecham's slogan in the Los Angeles Herald, July 20, 1893

In June 1836, the French newspaper La Presse was the first to include paid advertising in its pages, allowing it to lower its price, extend its readership and increase its profitability and the formula was soon copied by all titles.

Around 1840, Volney B. Palmer established the roots of the modern day advertising agency in Philadelphia. In 1842 Palmer bought large amounts of space in various newspapers at a discounted rate then resold the space at higher rates to advertisers. The actual ad (copy, layout, and artwork) was prepared by the company advertising, with Palmer being a space broker. The first full-service advertising agency of N.W. Ayer & Son was founded in 1869 in Philadelphia. Ayer & Son offered to plan, create, and implement complete advertising campaigns for its customers. By 1900 the advertising agency had become the focal point of creative planning, and advertising was firmly established as a profession. Around the same time, in France, Charles-Louis Havas extended the services of his news agency, Havas to include advertisement brokerage. At first, agencies were brokers for advertisement space in newspapers.

=== Late 19th century: Modern Advertising ===
The late 19th and early 20th centuries saw the rise of modern advertising, driven by industrialization and the growth of consumer goods. This era saw the early ad agencies employing more cunning methods such as persuasive diction and psychological tactics. Thomas J. Barratt of London has been called "the father of modern advertising". Working for the Pears soap company, Barratt created an effective advertising campaign for the company products, which involved the use of targeted slogans, images, and phrases. One of his slogans, "Good morning. Have you used Pears' soap?" was famous in its day and into the 20th century. In 1882, Barratt recruited English actress and socialite Lillie Langtry to become the poster girl for Pears, making her the first celebrity to endorse a commercial product.

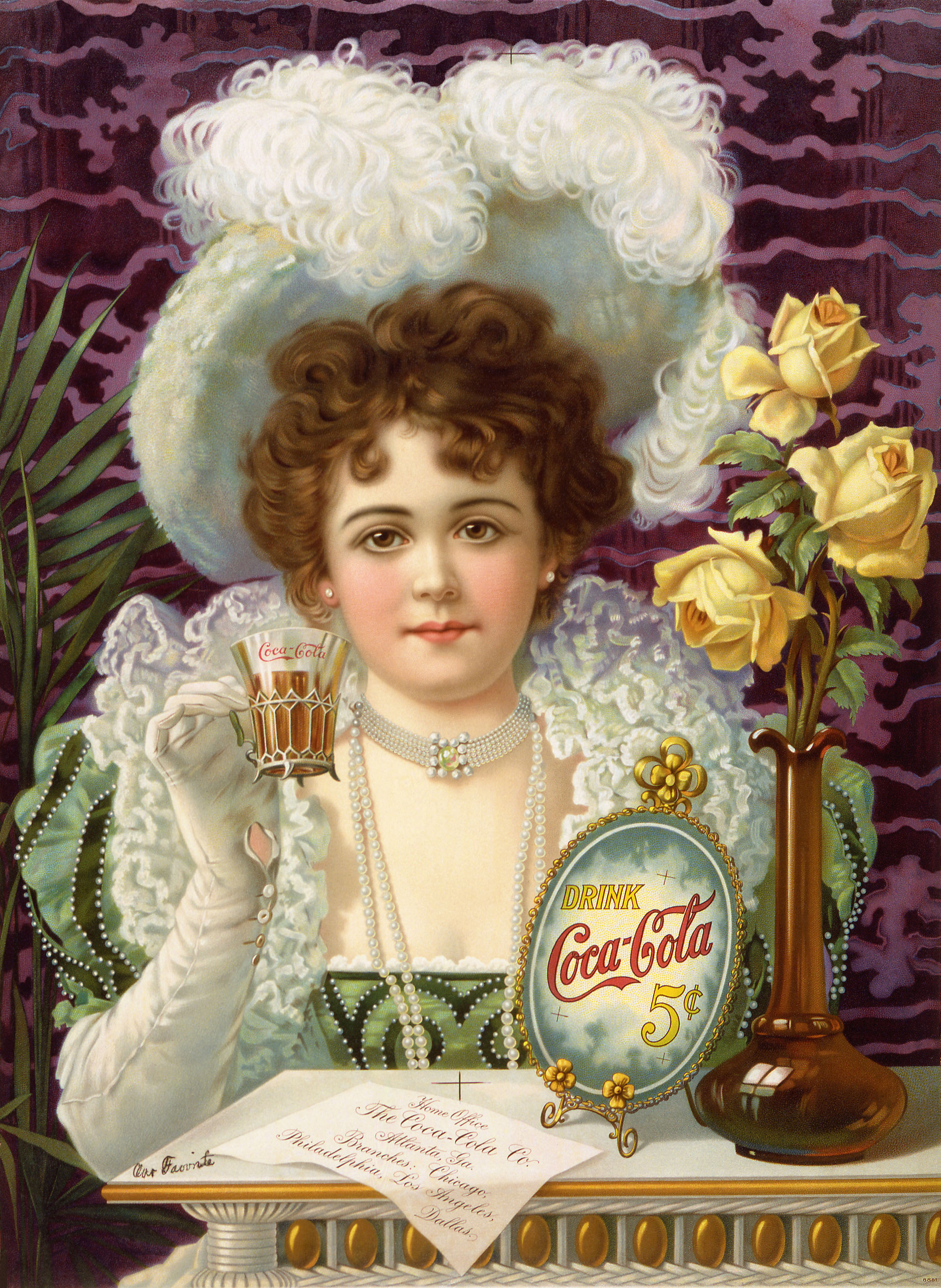
A Coca-Cola advertisement from the 1890s

Becoming the company's brand manager in 1865, listed as the first of its kind by the Guinness Book of Records, Barratt introduced many of the crucial ideas that lie behind successful advertising, and these were widely circulated in his day. He stressed the importance of a strong and exclusive brand image for Pears and of emphasizing the product's availability through saturation campaigns. He also understood the importance of constantly reevaluating the market for changing tastes, stating in 1907 that "tastes change, fashions change, and the advertiser has to change with them. An idea that was effective a generation ago would fall flat, stale, and unprofitable if presented to the public today. Not that the idea of today is always better than the older idea, but it is different – it hits the present taste."

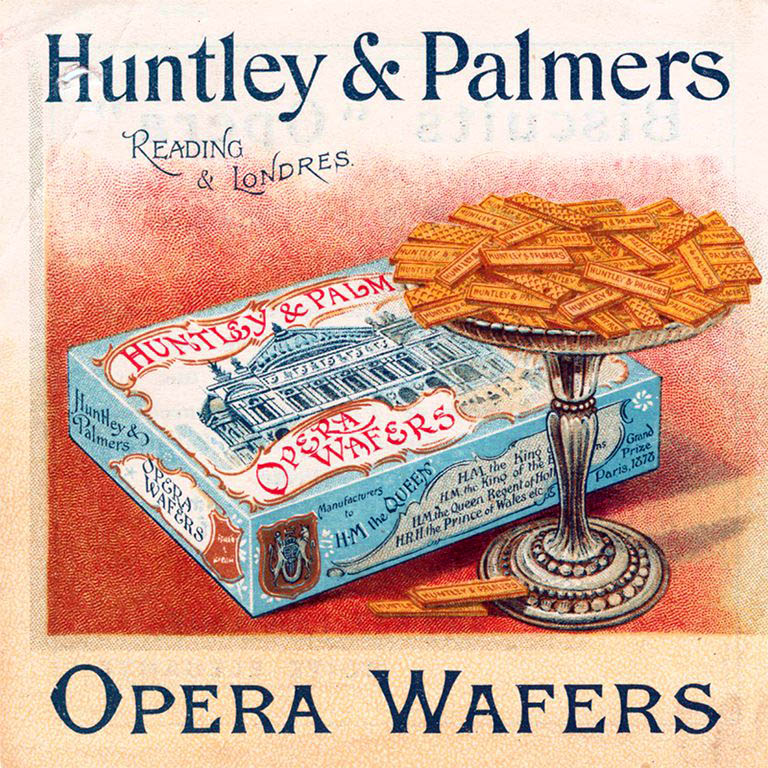
Advertising for Huntley & Palmers wafers c. 1890

Enhanced advertising revenues was one effect of the Industrial Revolution in Britain. Thanks to the revolution and the consumers it created, by the mid-19th century biscuits and chocolate became products for the masses, and British biscuit manufacturers were among the first to introduce branding to distinguish grocery products. One the world's first global brands, Huntley & Palmers biscuits were sold in 172 countries in 1900, and their global reach was reflected in their advertisements.

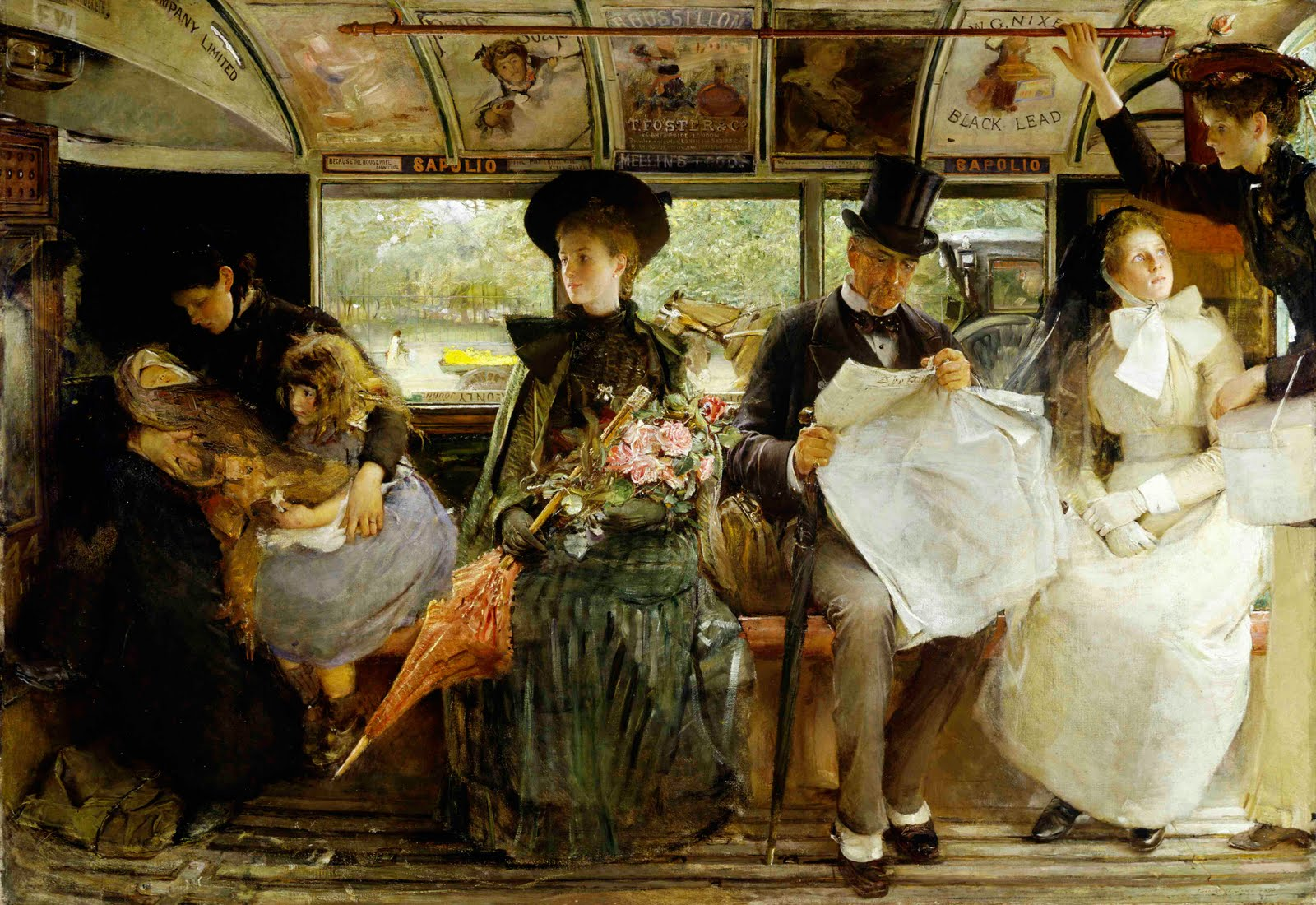
George William Joy's depiction of the interior of a late 19th century omnibus conspicuously shows the advertisements placed overhead.

=== 20th century onwards ===
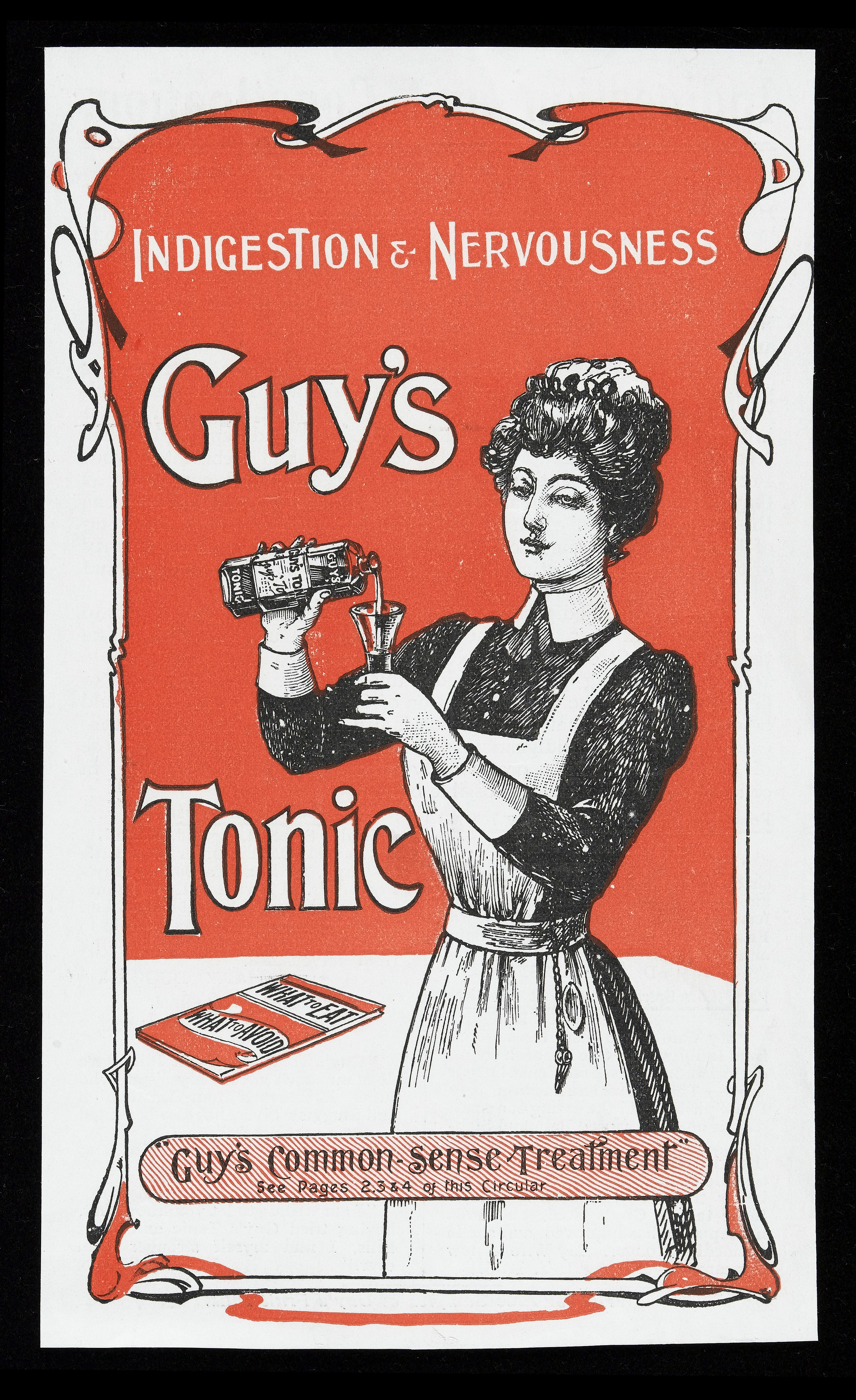
Advertisement for Guy's Tonic in the 1900s

Advertising revenue as a percent of US GDP shows a rise in audio-visual and digital advertising at the expense of print media.

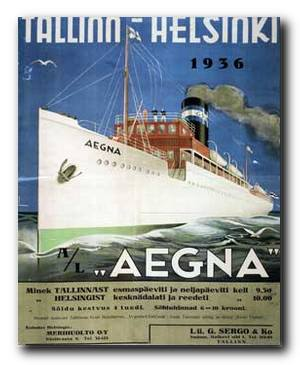
An Estonian language advertisement about a cruise between Tallinn and Helsinki in the 1930s

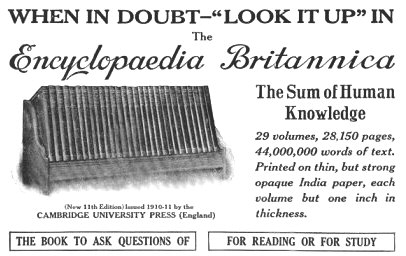
A print advertisement for the 1913 issue of the Encyclopædia Britannica

As a result of massive industrialization, advertising increased dramatically in the United States. In 1919, advertising expenditure was 2.5% of gross domestic product (GDP). Industry could not benefit from its increased productivity without a substantial increase in consumer spending. This contributed to the development of mass marketing designed to influence the population's economic behavior on a larger scale. In the 1910s and 1920s, advertisers in the U.S. adopted the doctrine that human instincts could be targeted and harnessed – "sublimated" into the desire to purchase commodities. Edward Bernays, a nephew of Sigmund Freud, became associated with the method and is sometimes called the founder of modern advertising and public relations. Bernays claimed that:

[The] general principle, that men are very largely actuated by motives which they conceal from themselves, is as true of mass as of individual psychology. It is evident that the successful propagandist must understand the true motives and not be content to accept the reasons which men give for what they do.

In other words, selling products by appealing to the rational minds of customers (the main method used prior to Bernays) was much less effective than selling products based on the unconscious desires that Bernays felt were the true motivators of human action. "Sex sells" became a controversial issue, with techniques for titillating and enlarging the audience posing a challenge to conventional morality.

In the 1920s, under Secretary of Commerce Herbert Hoover, the American government promoted advertising. Hoover himself delivered an address to the Associated Advertising Clubs of the World in 1925 called 'Advertising Is a Vital Force in Our National Life." In October 1929, the head of the U.S. Bureau of Foreign and Domestic Commerce, Julius Klein, stated "Advertising is the key to world prosperity." This was part of the "unparalleled" collaboration between business and government in the 1920s.

During this era, tobacco companies became major advertisers in order to sell packaged cigarettes. The tobacco companies pioneered new advertising techniques when they hired Bernays to create positive associations with tobacco smoking.

Advertising was also used as a vehicle for cultural assimilation, encouraging workers to exchange their traditional habits and community structure in favor of a shared "modern" lifestyle. An important tool for influencing immigrant workers was the American Association of Foreign Language Newspapers (AAFLN). The AAFLN was primarily an advertising agency but also gained heavily centralized control over much of the immigrant press.

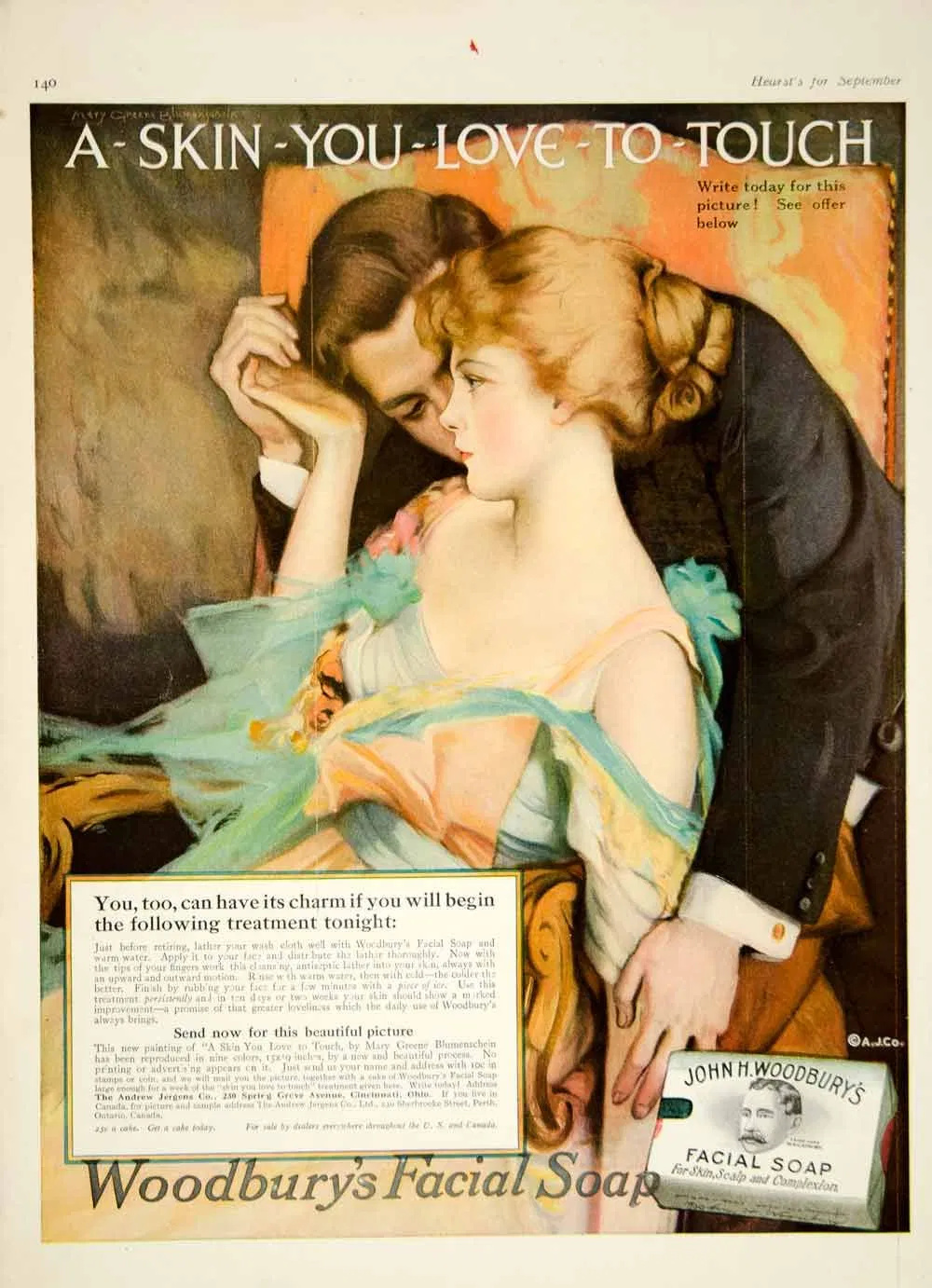
1916 Ladies' Home Journal version of the famous ad by Helen Lansdowne Resor of the J. Walter Thompson Agency

At the turn of the 20th century, advertising was one of the few career choices for women. As women were responsible for most household purchasing, advertisers and agencies recognized the value of women's insight during the creative process. In fact, the first American advertising to use a sexual sell was created by a woman – for a soap product. Although tame by today's standards, the advertisement featured a couple with the message "A skin you love to touch".

In the 1920s, psychologists Walter D. Scott and John B. Watson contributed applied psychological theory to the field of advertising. Scott said, "Man has been called the reasoning animal, but he could with greater truthfulness be called the creature of suggestion. He is reasonable, but he is to a greater extent suggestible". He demonstrated this through his advertising technique of a direct command to the consumer.

==== Radio from the 1920s ====
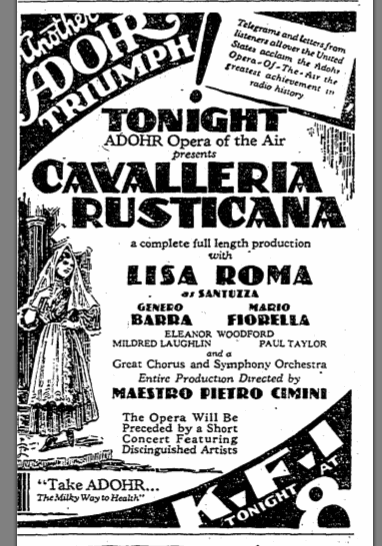
Advertisement for a live radio broadcast, sponsored by a milk company, Adohr milk, and published in the Los Angeles Times on May 6, 1930

In the early 1920s, the first radio stations were established by radio equipment manufacturers, followed by non-profit organizations such as schools, clubs, and civic groups who also set up their own stations. Retailers and consumer goods manufacturers quickly recognized radio's potential to reach consumers in their homes and soon adopted advertising techniques that would allow their messages to stand out; slogans, mascots, and jingles began to appear on radio in the 1920s and early television in the 1930s.

The rise of mass media communications allowed manufacturers of branded goods to bypass retailers by advertising directly to consumers. This was a major paradigm shift that forced manufacturers to focus on the brand and stimulated the need for superior insights into consumer purchasing, consumption, and usage behavior; their needs, wants, and aspirations. The earliest radio drama series were sponsored by soap manufacturers and the genre became known as a soap opera. Before long, radio station owners realized they could increase advertising revenue by selling 'air-time' in small time allocations, which could be sold to multiple businesses. By the 1930s, these advertising spots, as the packets of time became known, were being sold by the station's geographical sales representatives, ushering in an era of national radio advertising.

By the 1940s, manufacturers began to recognize the way in which consumers were developing personal relationships with their brands in a social/psychological/anthropological sense. Advertisers began to use motivational research and consumer research to gather insights into consumer purchasing. Strong branded campaigns for Chrysler and Exxon/Esso, using insights drawn research methods from psychology and cultural anthropology, led to some of the most enduring campaigns of the 20th century.

==== Commercial television in the 1950s ====
In the early 1950s, the DuMont Television Network began the modern practice of selling advertisement time to multiple sponsors. Previously, DuMont had trouble finding sponsors for many of their programs and compensated by selling smaller blocks of advertising time to several businesses. This eventually became the standard for the commercial television industry in the United States. However, it was still a common practice to have single sponsor shows, such as The United States Steel Hour. In some instances the sponsors exercised great control over the content of the show – up to and including having one's advertising agency actually writing the show. The single sponsor model is much less prevalent now, a notable exception being the Hallmark Hall of Fame.

==== Cable television from the 1980s ====
The late 1980s and early 1990s saw the introduction of cable television and particularly MTV. Pioneering the concept of the music video, MTV ushered in a new type of advertising: the consumer tunes in for the advertising message, rather than it being a by-product or afterthought. As cable and satellite television became increasingly prevalent, specialty channels emerged, including channels entirely devoted to advertising, such as QVC, Home Shopping Network, and ShopTV Canada.

==== Internet from the 1990s ====
With the advent of the ad server, online advertising grew, contributing to the "dot-com" boom of the 1990s. Entire corporations operated solely on advertising revenue, offering everything from coupons to free Internet access. At the turn of the 21st century, some websites, including the search engine Google, changed online advertising by personalizing ads based on web browsing behavior. This has led to other similar efforts and an increase in interactive advertising. Online advertising introduced new opportunities for targeting and engagement, with platforms like Google and Facebook leading the charge. This shift has significantly altered the advertising landscape, making digital advertising a dominant force in the industry.

The share of advertising spending relative to GDP has changed little despite large changes in media since 1925. In 1925, the main advertising media in America were newspapers, magazines, signs on streetcars, and outdoor posters. Advertising spending as a share of GDP was about 2.9%. By 1998, television and radio had become major advertising media; by 2017, the balance between broadcast and online advertising had shifted, with online spending exceeding broadcast. Nonetheless, advertising spending as a share of GDP was only slightly lower – about 2.4%.

Guerrilla marketing involves unusual approaches such as staged encounters in public places, giveaways of products such as cars that are covered with brand messages, and interactive advertising where the viewer can respond to become part of the advertising message. This type of advertising is unpredictable, which can cause consumers to buy the product or idea. This reflects an increasing trend of interactive and "embedded" ads, such as via product placement, having consumers vote through text messages, and various campaigns utilizing social network services such as Facebook or Twitter/X.

In some instances businesses will obtain media by providing equity. This is known as media for equity, where advertising is not sold, but is instead provided to start-up companies in return for equity. If the company grows and is sold, the media companies receive cash for their shares. This practice started in Europe but has become increasingly popular in the US, with businesses such as Uber, Airbnb and Pinterest achieving global growth by using such tactics.

== Classification ==
Advertising may be categorized in a variety of ways, including by style, target audience, geographic scope, medium, or purpose. For example, in print advertising, classification by style can include display advertising (ads with design elements sold by size) vs. classified advertising (ads without design elements sold by the word or line). Advertising may be local, national or global. An ad campaign may be directed toward consumers or to businesses. The purpose of an ad may be to raise awareness (brand advertising), or to elicit an immediate sale (direct response advertising). The term above the line (ATL) is used for advertising involving mass media; more targeted forms of advertising and promotion are referred to as below the line (BTL). The two terms date back to 1954 when Procter & Gamble began paying their advertising agencies differently from other promotional agencies. In the 2010s, as advertising technology developed, a new term, through the line (TTL) began to come into use, referring to integrated advertising campaigns.

=== Traditional media ===
A 1938 cinema advertisement for Esso oil

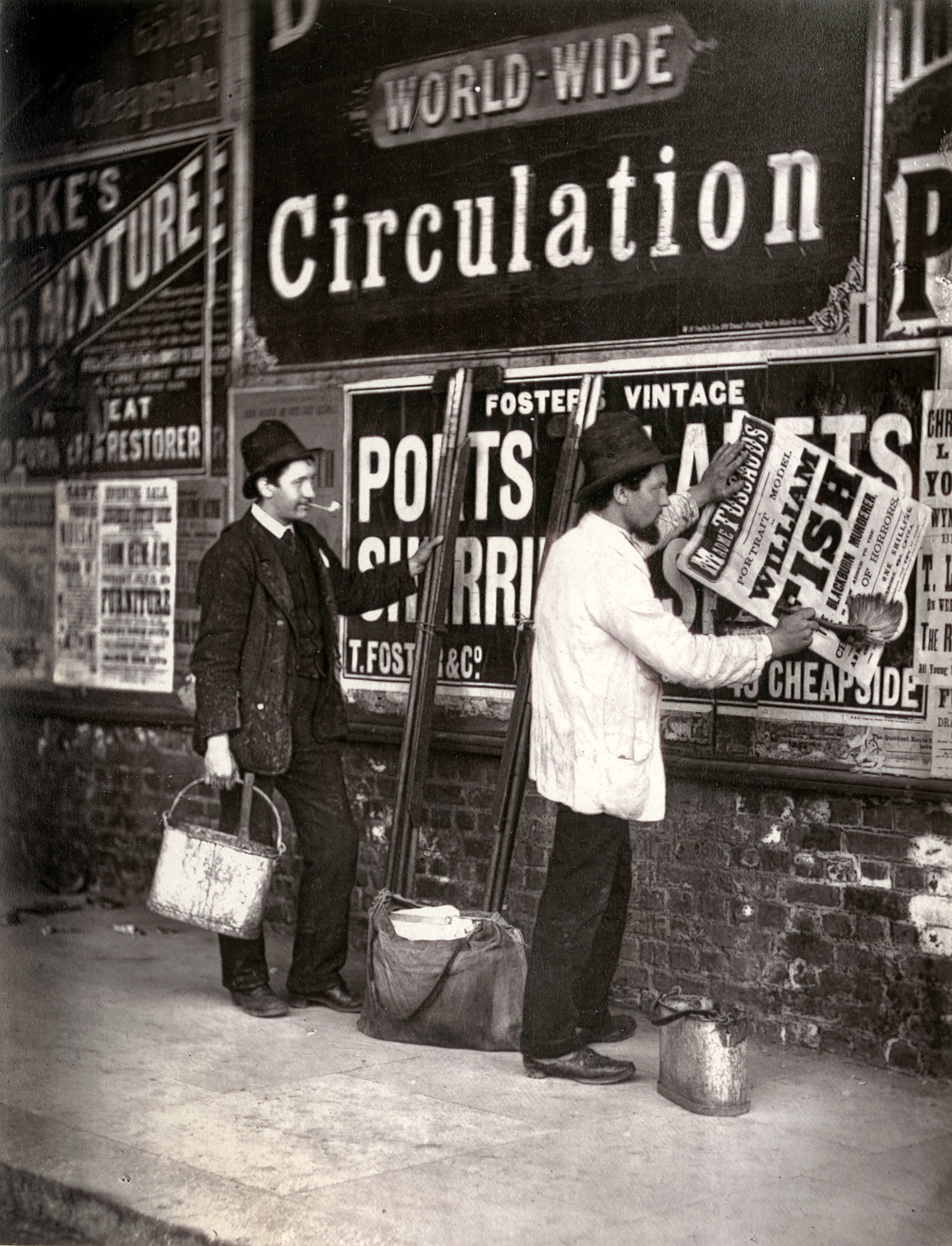
Advertising man pasting a bill for Madame Tussauds, London in 1877

Virtually any medium can be used for advertising. Commercial advertising media can include wall paintings, billboards, street furniture components, printed flyers and rack cards, radio, cinema and television adverts, web banners, mobile telephone screens, shopping carts, web popups, skywriting, bus stop benches, human billboards and forehead advertising, magazines, newspapers, town criers, sides of buses, banners attached to airplanes ("logojets"), in-flight advertisements on seatback tray tables or overhead storage, taxicab doors, roof mounts and passenger screens, musical stage shows, subway platforms and trains, elastic bands on disposable diapers, doors of bathroom stalls, stickers on fruit in supermarkets, shopping cart handles (grabertising), in streaming audio and video, posters, and on event tickets and supermarket receipts. Any situation in which an "identified" sponsor pays to deliver their message through a medium is advertising.

Share of global adspend
Medium	2021	2024
Digital advertising	52.9%	59.4%
Television advertisement	28.3%	24.9%
Outdoor advertising	5.3%	5.2%
Radio advertisement	5.3%	4.5%
Newspapers	4.7%	3.5%
Magazines	3.1%	2.2%
Cinema	0.3%	0.4%

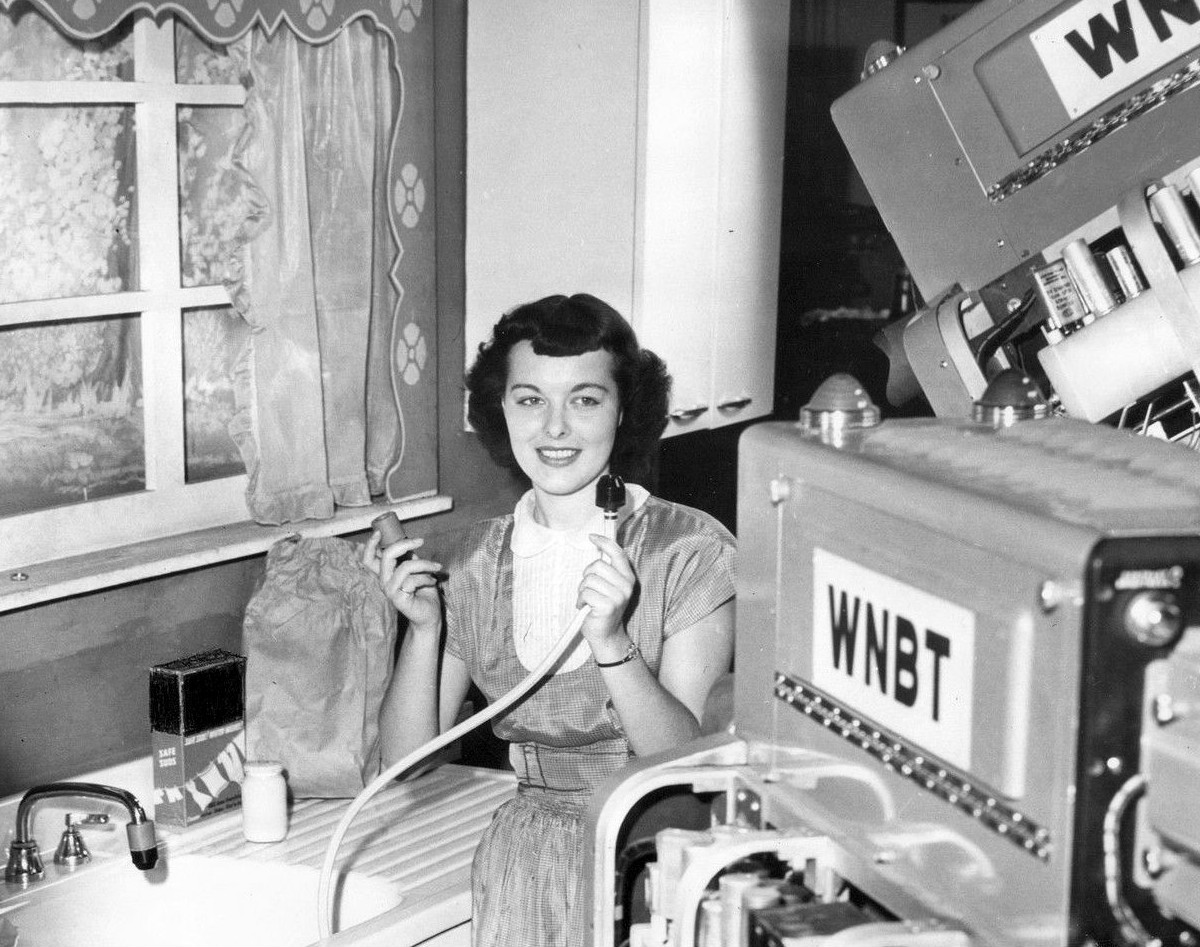
A television commercial being filmed in 1948

Television
Television advertising is one of the most expensive types of advertising; networks charge large amounts for commercial airtime during popular events. The annual Super Bowl football game in the United States is known as the most prominent advertising event on television – in 2013 it attracted an audience of over 108 million and studies have shown that 50% of those tune in to see the advertisements. The 2025 game attracted an audience of over 123 million, with a thirty-second ad costing US$8 million. Virtual advertisements may be inserted into regular programming through computer graphics. It is typically inserted into otherwise blank backdrops or used to replace local billboards that are not relevant to the remote broadcast audience. This technique is especially used in televised sporting events. Virtual product placement is also possible. An infomercial is a long-format television commercial, typically five minutes or longer. The name blends the words "information" and "commercial". The main objective in an infomercial is to create an impulse purchase, so that the target sees the presentation and then immediately buys the product through the advertised toll-free telephone number or website. Infomercials describe and often demonstrate products, and commonly have testimonials from customers and industry professionals.

Radio
Radio advertisements are broadcast as radio waves from a transmitter to an antenna and thus to a receiving device. Increasingly radio is transmitted via the internet. Airtime is purchased from a station or network in exchange for airing the commercials. While radio has the limitation of being restricted to sound, proponents of radio advertising often cite this as an advantage. According Nielsen Media Research data published by the Radio Advertising Bureau, 82% of people in the US aged 12 and older listened to terrestrial radio in a given week, in 2022.

Online
Online advertising is a form of promotion that uses the Internet and World Wide Web for the expressed purpose of delivering marketing messages to attract customers. Online ads are delivered by an ad server. Examples of online advertising include contextual ads that appear on search engine results pages, banner ads, pay per click text ads, rich media ads, Social network advertising, online classified advertising, advertising networks and e-mail marketing, including e-mail spam. A newer form of online advertising is called Native Ads; which go in a website's news feed and are supposed to improve user experience by being less intrusive. However, some people argue this practice is deceptive.

Domain names
Domain name advertising is most commonly done through pay per click web search engines, however, advertisers often lease space directly on domain names that generically describe their products. Domain name registrants can be easy to identify through WHOIS records that are publicly available at registrar websites. Domain name advertising was originally developed by Oingo (later known as Applied Semantics), one of Google's early acquisitions.

Product placements
This is when a product or brand is embedded in entertainment and media. For example, in a film, the main character can use a branded product, such as in the movie Minority Report, where Tom Cruise's character John Anderton uses a branded Nokia phone and wears a watch engraved with the Bulgari logo. Another example of product placement in film is in I, Robot, where main character played by Will Smith mentions his Converse shoes several times, calling them "classics", because the film is set far in the future. I, Robot and Spaceballs also showcase futuristic cars with the Audi and Mercedes-Benz logos clearly displayed on the front of the vehicles. Cadillac chose to advertise in the movie The Matrix Reloaded, which as a result contained many scenes in which Cadillac cars were used. Similarly, product placement for Omega Watches, Ford, VAIO, BMW and Aston Martin cars are featured in James Bond films, most notably Casino Royale. In "Fantastic Four: Rise of the Silver Surfer", the main transport vehicle shows a large Dodge logo on the front. Blade Runner includes some of the most obvious product placement; the whole film stops to show a Coca-Cola billboard.

Print
Print advertising describes advertising in a printed medium such as a newspaper, magazine, or trade journal. This encompasses everything from media with a very broad readership base, such as a major national newspaper or magazine, to more narrowly targeted media such as local newspapers and trade journals on very specialized topics. One form of print advertising is classified advertising, which allows private individuals or companies to purchase a small, narrowly targeted ad paid by the word or line. Another form of print advertising is the display ad, which is generally a larger ad with design elements that typically run in an article section of a newspaper.

Outdoor

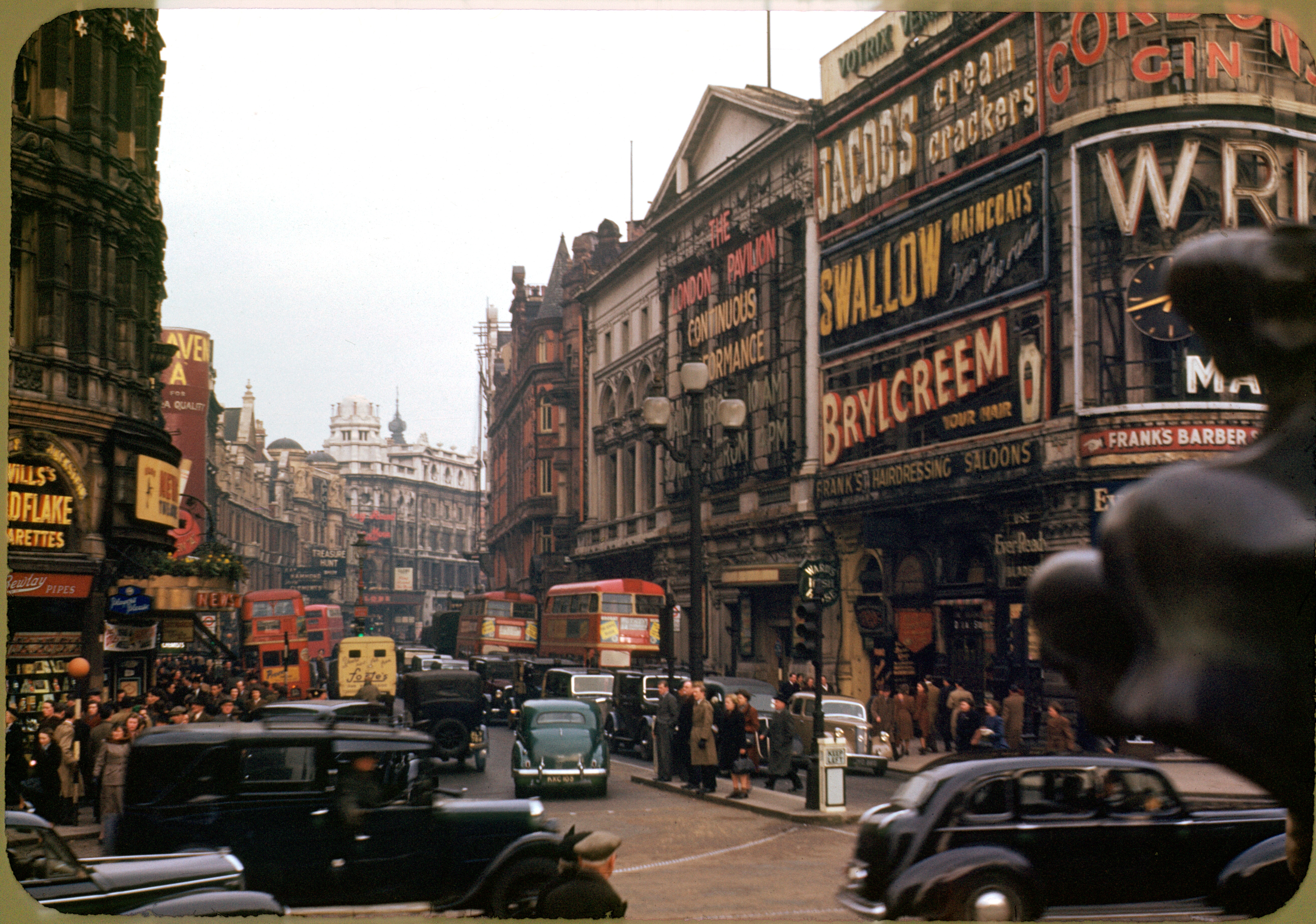
Outdoor advertisements, such as Shaftesbury Avenue, London c. 1949 pictured here, are usually placed in busy locations.

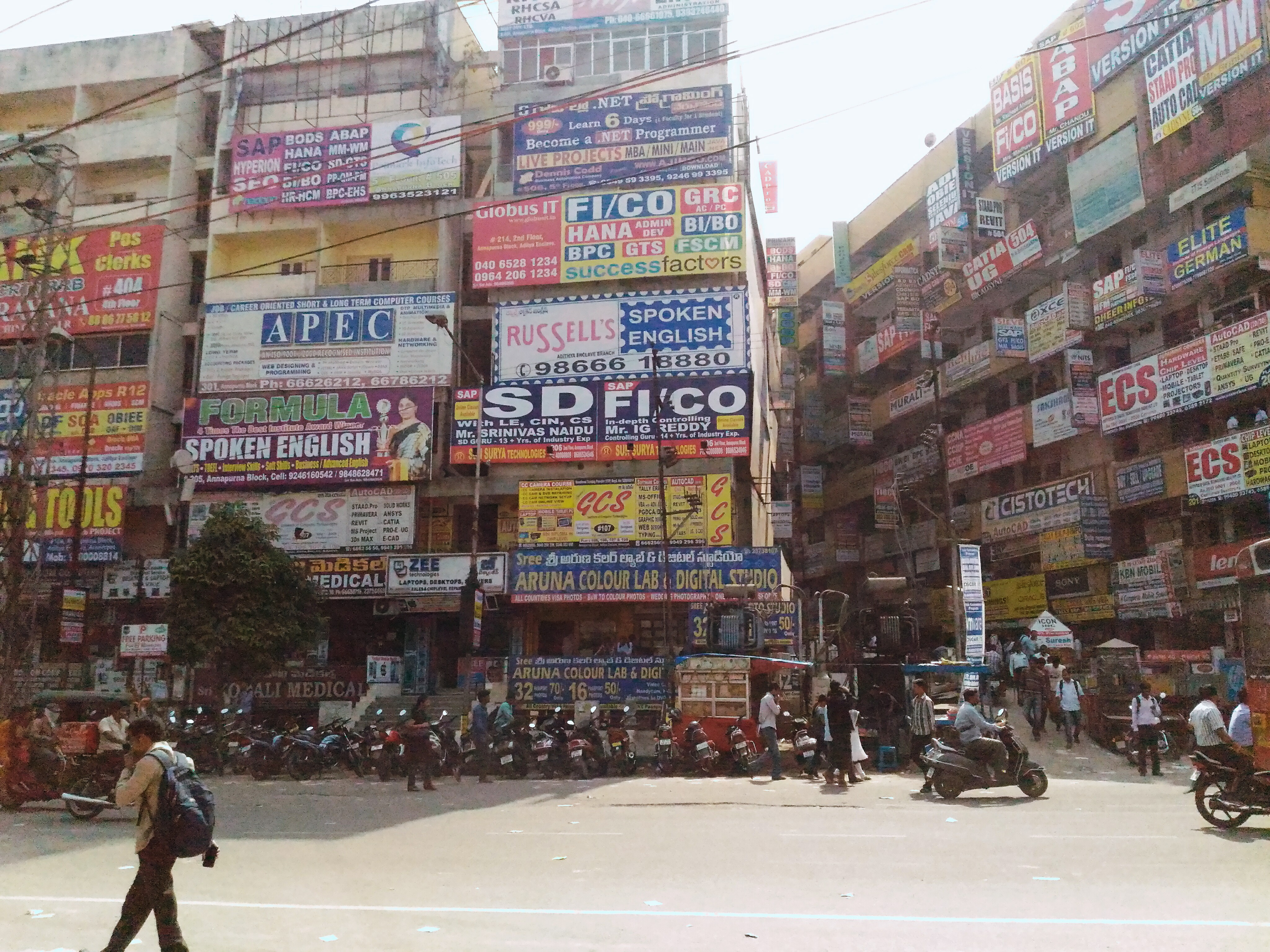
Hoardings as seen on commercial buildings in Hyderabad, India

Billboards, also known as hoardings in some parts of the world, are large structures located in public places which display advertisements to passing pedestrians and motorists. Most often, they are located on main roads with a large amount of passing motor and pedestrian traffic; however, they can be placed in any location with large numbers of viewers, such as on mass transit vehicles and in stations, in shopping malls or office buildings, and in stadiums. Street advertising involves creating outdoor advertising on street furniture and pavements and can use products such as Reverse Graffiti, air dancers and 3D pavement advertising. Sheltered outdoor advertising combines outdoor with indoor advertisement by placing large mobile structures (tents) in public places on a temporary basis. The large outer advertising space aims to entice the observer in, with the product promoted inside. Mobile billboards are generally vehicle mounted billboards or digital screens. These can be on dedicated vehicles built solely for carrying advertisements and can travel along routes preselected by advertisers. They can also be specially equipped cargo trucks or, in some cases, large banners strewn from planes. Billboards are often lighted; some being backlit, and others employing spotlights. Some billboard displays are static, while others change; for example, continuously or periodically rotating a set of advertisements. Mobile displays are used for various situations in metropolitan areas throughout the world, including: target advertising, one-day and long-term campaigns, conventions, sporting events, store openings and similar promotional events, and advertisements from smaller companies.

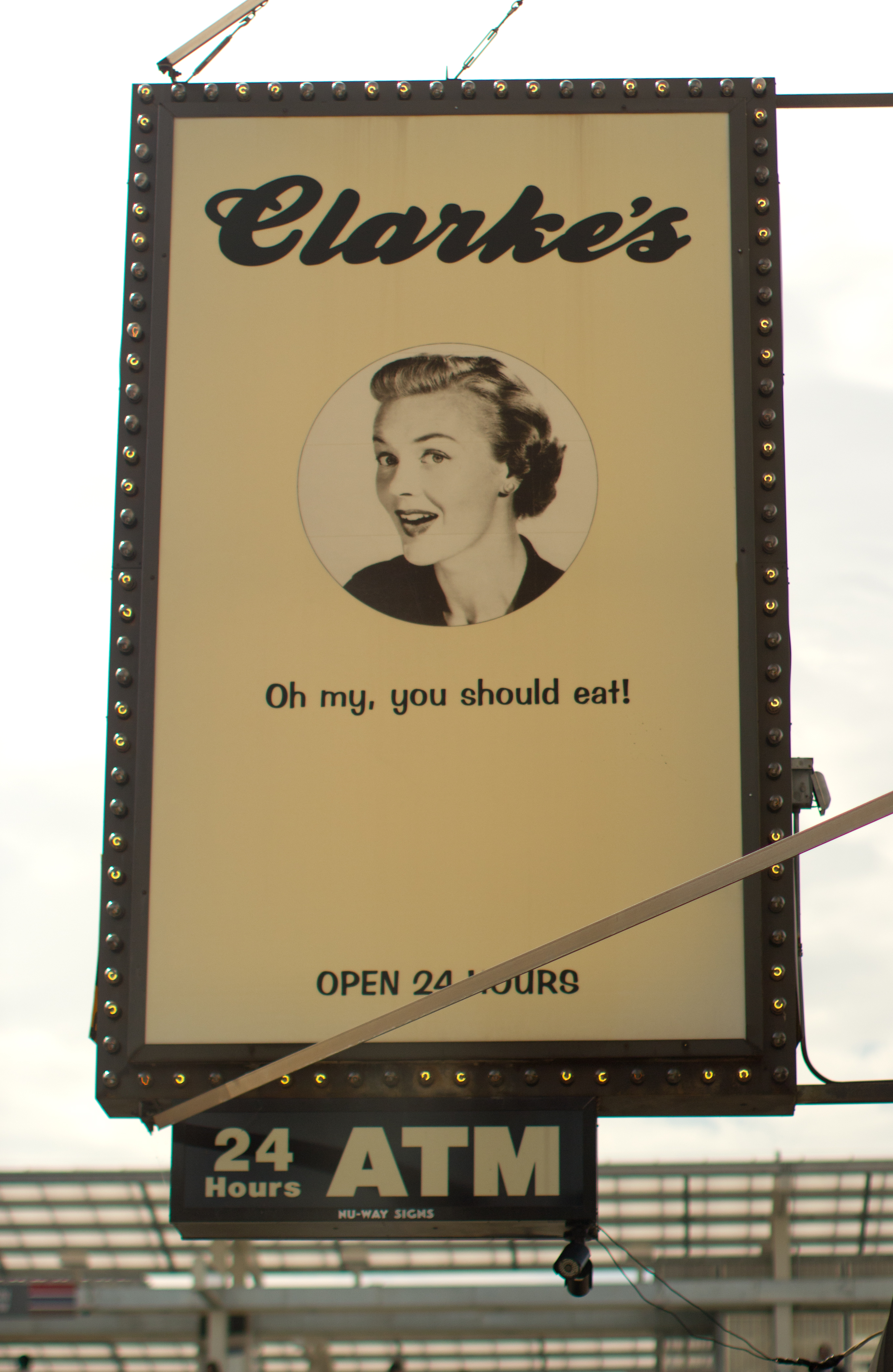
An advertisement for a diner. Such signs are common on storefronts.

Point-of-sale
In-store advertising is any advertisement placed in a retail store. It includes placement of a product in visible locations in a store, such as at eye level, at the ends of aisles and near checkout counters (a.k.a. POP – point of purchase display), eye-catching displays promoting a specific product, advertisements in places such as shopping carts and in-store video displays.

Novelties (promotional products)
Advertising printed on small, tangible items such as coffee mugs, T-shirts, pens, and bags is commonly referred to as promotional merchandise, historically known as advertising novelties or advertising specialties. Industry commentary has noted a shift in the sector from low-cost giveaway items towards more purpose-driven, brand-aligned products intended to support broader marketing strategies and long-term brand development.

Celebrity endorsements
Advertising where a celebrity endorses a product and a brand leverages celebrity influence, fame and popularity to gain recognition for their products or to promote specific stores' or products. Advertisers often advertise their products when, for example, celebrities share their favorite products or wear clothes by specific brands or designers. Celebrities are often involved in advertising campaigns, appearing in television, digital and print adverts to advertise brands and their products. The use of celebrities to endorse a brand can have disadvantages, as mistakes, poor behaviour or controversy involving the celebrity can be detrimental to the public relations of a brand. Celebrities such as Britney Spears have advertised for multiple products including Pepsi, Candies from Kohl's, Twister, NASCAR, and Toyota.

Aerial
Using aircraft, balloons or airships to create or display advertising media. Skywriting is a notable example. Drones are now used for aerial advertising.

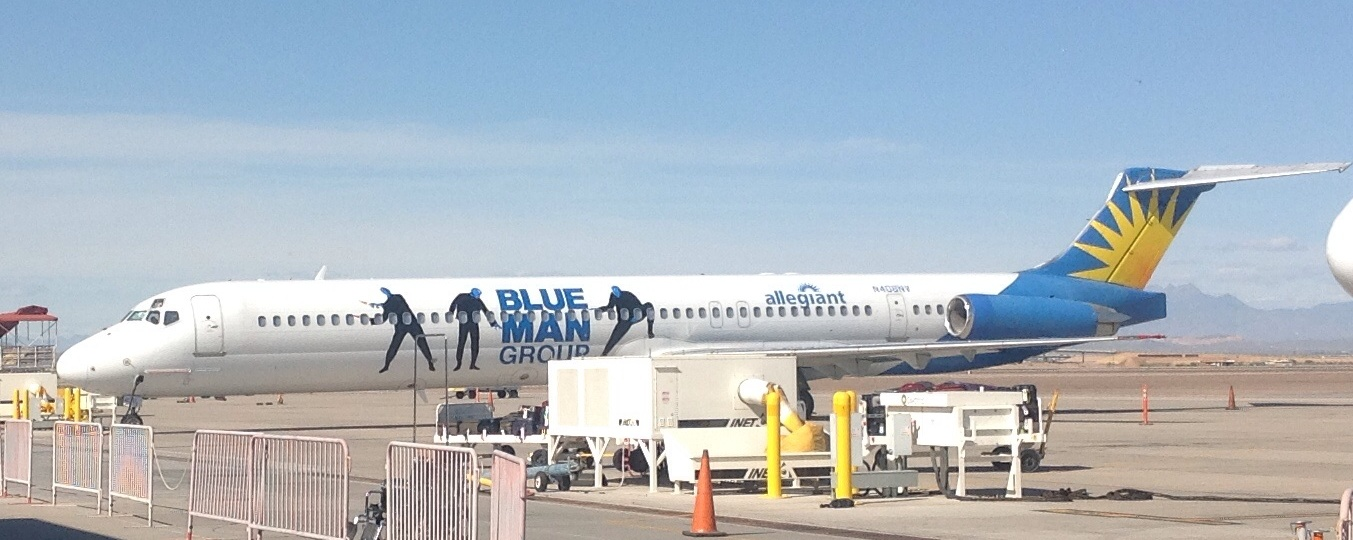
An Allegiant Air aircraft in the special Blue Man Group livery

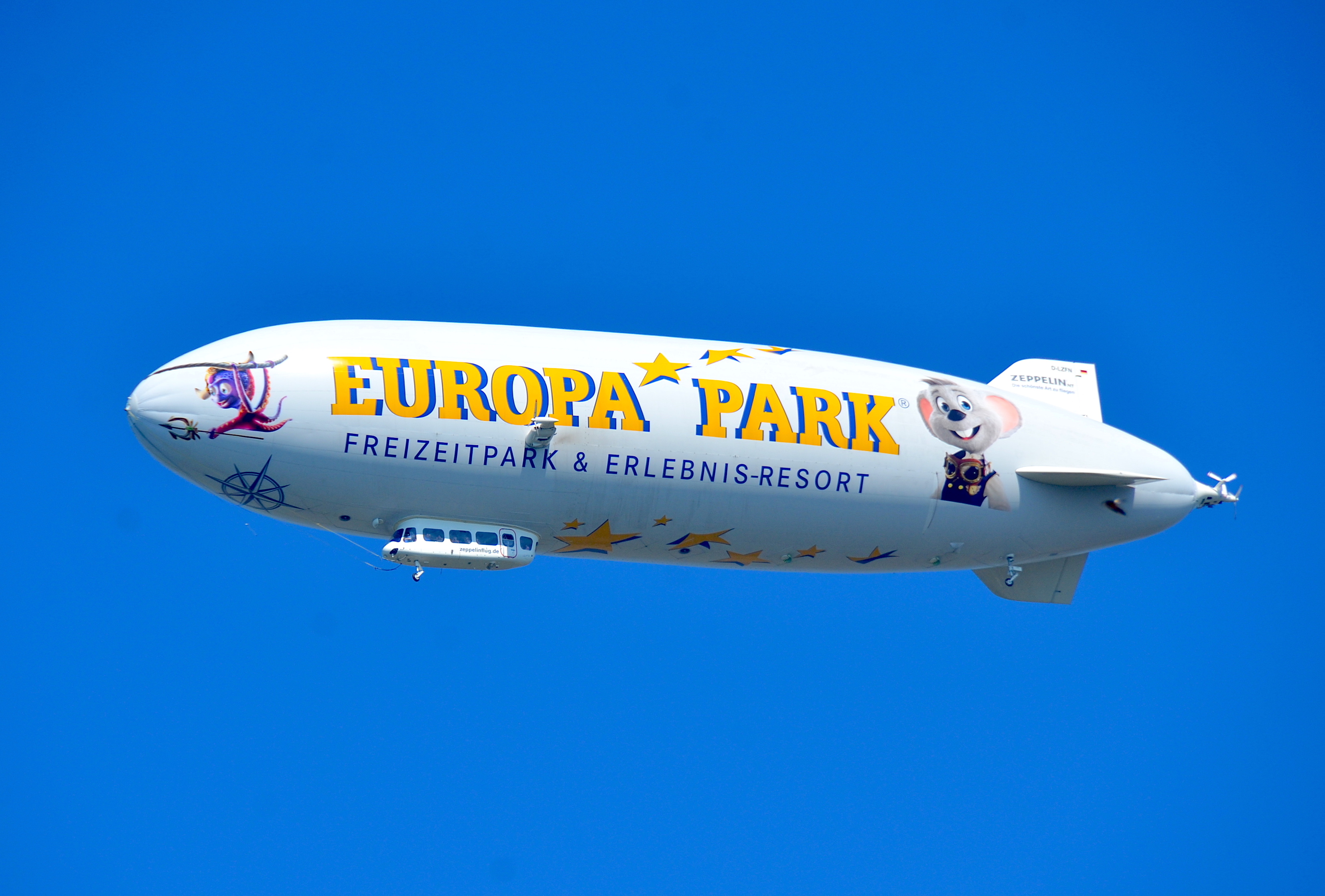
A Zeppelin NT (D-LZFN) of Friedrichshafen used for advertisement

=== New media ===
Advanced advertising is data-driven advertising, using large quantities of data and precise targeting and measurement tools. Advanced advertising makes it easier for companies who sell ad space to attribute customer purchases to the ads they display or broadcast. Increasingly, new media approaches are overtaking "traditional" media such as television, radio and newspaper as people shift to using the internet for activities such as reading, watching or listening to the news.

Online advertising began with unsolicited bulk e-mail advertising known as "e-mail spam". Spam has been a problem for e-mail users since 1978. As new online communication channels became available, advertising followed. The first banner ad appeared on the World Wide Web in 1994. Internet advertising allows companies to target specific audiences, which can improve return on investment.

The rise of the internet resulted in people using search engines to find websites and the emergence of search engine advertising, as companies sought to advertise to consumers online. Google was founded in 1998 and by the early 2000's had become the most widely used search engine. In 2000 Google launched AdWords, which allowed advertisers to bid, in order for their adverts to appear in paid search results. Their auction bidding system used factors such as click-through rate and relevance, with advertisers using high quality ads rewarded with better ad placements and lower costs per click (CPC).

In online display advertising, display ads can generate awareness quickly. Whereas search requires someone to be aware of a need, display advertising can drive awareness of something new, without previous knowledge. Display can work well for direct response. Online display advertising is not only used for generating awareness, it can also be used for direct response campaigns.

Mobile phones became a new mass medium in 1998 when the first paid downloadable content appeared on mobile phones in Finland, mobile advertising followed, first launched in Finland in 2000. In 2007, the value of mobile advertising was expected to be $3 billion, with most of this generated via mobile search and video. By 2025 this had increased to an estimated market size of $262 billion.

More advanced mobile ads include banner ads, coupons, Multimedia Messaging Service picture and video messages, advergames and various engagement marketing campaigns. One feature driving mobile ads is the 2D barcode (QR code) which replaces the need to type web addresses, and uses the camera in mobile phones to access web content. 83% of Japanese mobile phone users are active users of 2D barcodes.

Some companies have proposed placing messages or corporate logos on the side of booster rockets and the International Space Station. An advertising method has emerged called "ARvertising", which uses augmented reality technology. The emerging technology of drone displays has been used for advertising purposes.

The internet has also had a significant impact on how people watch TV, with many people now choosing to stream TV content at a time that is convenient to them. This is particularly true of people in younger age groups, with 50% of streaming viewers being aged 35 or less. In the UK, less than half of 16-24 year olds were watching traditional TV in an average week, in 2023-2024. As a result, companies are increasingly using connected TV (CTV) to advertise, with this being one of the growing media channels. In 2024, it was suggested that ad spend in this class of media was increasing by almost 20% each year, with this type of advertising offering increased targeting opportunities, to improve effectiveness.

The emergence of social networking sites such as Facebook, Instagram, Twitter/X and TikTok has led to companies increasingly using social media for advertising. In 2024, global social media advertising spend was expected to be $247 billion, a 14.3% year on year increase. In 2025, Alphabet, Meta and Amazon controlled more than 50% of all advertising spend (globally, excluding China). These technology companies are able to invest heavily in AI optimisation and creative automation which can improve advertising campaign effectiveness and they all have a first-party data infrastructure.

=== Crowdsourcing ===
The concept of crowdsourcing has given way to the trend of user-generated advertisements. User-generated ads are created by people, as opposed to an advertising agency or the company themselves, often resulting from brand sponsored advertising competitions. For the 2007 Super Bowl, the Frito-Lays division of PepsiCo held the "Crash the Super Bowl" contest, allowing people to create their own Doritos commercials. Chevrolet held a similar competition for their Tahoe line of SUVs. Due to the success of the Doritos user-generated ads in the 2007 Super Bowl, Frito-Lays relaunched the competition for the 2009 and 2010 Super Bowl. The resulting ads were among the most-watched and most-liked Super Bowl ads. In fact, the winning ad that aired in the 2009 Super Bowl was ranked by the USA Today Super Bowl Ad Meter as the top ad for the year while the winning ads that aired in the 2010 Super Bowl were found by Nielsen's BuzzMetrics to be the "most buzzed-about". Another example of companies using crowdsourcing successfully is the beverage company Jones Soda that encourages consumers to participate in the label design themselves.

This trend has given rise to several online platforms that host user-generated advertising competitions on behalf of a company. Founded in 2007, Zooppa has launched ad competitions for brands such as Google, Nike, Hershey's, General Mills, Microsoft, NBC Universal, Zinio, and Mini Cooper. Crowdsourcing remains controversial, as the long-term impact on the advertising industry is still unclear.

=== Globalization ===
Advertising has gone through five major stages of development: domestic, export, international, multi-national, and global. For global advertisers, there are four, potentially competing, business objectives that must be balanced when developing worldwide advertising: building a brand while speaking with one voice, developing economies of scale in the creative process, maximizing local effectiveness of ads, and increasing the company's speed of implementation. Born from the evolutionary stages of global marketing are the three primary and fundamentally different approaches to the development of global advertising executions: exporting executions, producing local executions, and importing ideas that travel.

Advertising research is key to determining the success of an ad in any country or region. The ability to identify which elements and/or moments of an ad contribute to its success is how economies of scale are maximized. Once one knows what works in an ad, that idea or ideas can be imported by any other market. Market research measures, such as Flow of Attention, Flow of Emotion and branding moments provide insight into what is working in an ad in any country or region because the measures are based on the visual, not verbal, elements of the ad.

== Purposes ==
Companies and organisations have a number of business goals they wish to achieve. Broadly, advertising is used to help achieve these objectives. Advertising delivers a message to customers and prospective customers. Advertising predominantly informs consumers about a product or service to convince customers that their offerings are the best, to enhance the image of the company, to demonstrate new uses for established products, to promote new products/services, to draw customers to the business, and to retain existing customers. A successful advertising campaign initially defines a clear purpose. Common objectives include:

=== Brand awareness ===
This consists of advertising which aims to increase the number of people who know about (recognise and recall) a brand. This purpose will impact the type of channels/media and ad formats selected to achieve greater brand awareness. This type of objective can include creating awareness of new features a brand is offering, such as improving the in-store experience.

=== Customer retention ===
Typically a broader marketing activity, advertising campaigns can contribute to companies retaining existing customers. Such advertising may promote customer loyalty schemes and can involve showing personalised offers and promotions.

=== Lead generation ===
This involves a business or organisation conducting an advertising campaign where the purpose is to collect information such as name and email addresses, which constitutes a 'lead'. This can involve providing downloadable content or running webinars. Advertising effectiveness is measured by establishing the cost per lead. This data is then used for marketing activities with the aim of converting the prospect/lead to become a customer.

=== Sales promotions ===
Sales promotions are another way to advertise. Sales promotions are double purposed because they are used to gather information about what type of customers one draws in and where they are, and to jump start sales. Sales promotions include things like contests and games, sweepstakes, product giveaways, samples coupons, loyalty programs, and discounts. The ultimate goal of sales promotions is to stimulate potential customers to action.

== Theory ==
=== Hierarchy-of-effects models ===
Hierarchies of effects models attempt to theoretically explain that consumers go through a number of stages, that can be prompted by advertising, before purchasing a product or service.

- The model of Clow and Baack clarifies the objectives of an advertising campaign and for each individual advertisement. The model postulates six steps a buyer moves through when making a purchase:
  1. Awareness
  2. Knowledge
  3. Liking
  4. Preference
  5. Conviction
  6. Purchase
- Means-end theory suggests that an advertisement should contain a message or means that leads the consumer to a desired end-state.
- Leverage points aim to move the consumer from understanding a product's benefits to linking those benefits with personal values.

=== Marketing mix ===
The marketing mix was proposed by Harvard Business School professor Neil H. Borden and expanded on, and popularized by professor E. Jerome McCarthy in the 1960s. It consists of four basic elements called the "four Ps". Product is the first P representing the actual product. Price represents the process of determining the value of a product. Place represents the variables of getting the product to the consumer such as distribution channels, market coverage and movement organization. The last P stands for Promotion which is the process of reaching the target market and convincing them to buy the product.

The concept of the four Cs was introduced as a more customer-driven replacement of the four P's. There are two theories based on the four Cs: Lauterborn's four Cs (consumer, cost, communication, convenience) and Shimizu's four Cs (commodity, cost, channel, communication). Shimizu expanded the four Cs, to the 7Cs Compass Model by adding company or competitor, consumer and circumstances, to acknowledge the impact of competition, consumers who are not customers and circumstances beyond a companies control.

=== Research ===
Advertising research is a specialized form of research that works to improve the effectiveness and efficiency of advertising. It entails numerous forms of research which employ different methodologies. Advertising research includes pre-testing (also known as copy testing) and post-testing of ads and/or campaigns.

Pre-testing includes a wide range of qualitative and quantitative techniques, including: focus groups, in-depth target audience interviews (one-on-one interviews), small-scale quantitative studies and physiological measurement. The goal of this research is to better understand how different groups respond to various messages and visual prompts, thereby providing an assessment of how well the advertisement meets its communications goals.

Post-testing employs many of the same techniques as pre-testing, usually with a focus on understanding the change in awareness or attitude attributable to the advertisement. With the emergence of digital advertising technologies, many firms have begun to continuously post-test ads using real-time data. This may take the form of A/B split-testing or multivariate testing. Continuous ad tracking and the Communicus System are competing examples of post-testing advertising research types.

=== Semiotics ===
Meanings between consumers and marketers depict signs and symbols that are encoded in everyday objects. Semiotics is the study of signs and how they are interpreted. Advertising has many hidden signs and meanings within brand names, logos, package designs, print advertisements, and television advertisements. Semiotics aims to study and interpret the message being conveyed in (for example) advertisements. These signs can be images, words, fonts, colors, slogans, or a combination which must be interpreted by the audience or consumer. The "key to advertising analysis" is the signifier and the signified. The signifier is the object and the signified is the mental concept. A product has a signifier and a signified. The signifier is the color, brand name, logo design, and technology. The signified has two meanings known as denotative and connotative. The denotative meaning is the meaning of the product. A television's denotative meaning might be that it is high definition. The connotative meaning is the product's deep and hidden meaning. A connotative meaning of a television would be that it is top-of-the-line.

Apple's iPod commercials, starting in 2003, used a black silhouette of a person that was the age of Apple's target market. They placed the silhouette in front of a blue screen so that the picture behind the silhouette could be constantly changing. However, the one thing that stays the same in these ads is that there is music in the background and the silhouette is listening to that music on a white iPod through white headphones. Through advertising, the white color on a set of earphones now signifies that the music device is an iPod. The white color signifies almost all of Apple's products.

== Criticisms ==
While advertising can be seen as necessary for economic growth, it is not without social costs. Unsolicited commercial e-mail and other forms of spam became so common it was considered to be a nuisance, as well as being a financial burden on internet service providers. Advertising is increasingly prevalent in public spaces, such as schools, which some critics argue is unethical. In tandem with these criticisms, the advertising industry has seen low approval rates in surveys and negative cultural portrayals. A 2021 study of TV advertising found that only a third of advertisers achieved a positive return on investment. Unsolicited ads have been criticized as attention theft.

One of the common criticisms of advertising is the predominance of advertising foods high in sugar, fat, and salt specifically to children. Critics claim that food advertisements targeting children are exploitative and are not conducive with nutritional education to help children understand the consequences of their food choices. Children may not understand that they are being sold something, and may therefore be more impressionable. Michelle Obama criticized food companies for advertising unhealthy foods to children. Other criticisms include the influence of advertising on society and that some advertising can deceive. Cosmetic and health industry advertising has created causes of concern, such as being misleading. Political advertising has been scrutinized for misinformation, ethics and political bias.

== Regulation ==
There have been increasing efforts to protect people by regulating the content and influence of advertising. Some examples include restrictions for advertising alcohol, tobacco or gambling imposed in many countries, as well as bans on advertising to children, in some parts of Europe. Some advertising regulation focuses heavily on the veracity of claims and as such, there are often tighter restrictions placed around advertisements for food and healthcare products.

The advertising industries within some countries rely less on laws and more on systems of self-regulation. Advertisers and the media agree on a code of advertising standards that they attempt to uphold. The general aim of such codes is to ensure that any advertising is 'legal, decent, honest and truthful'. Some self-regulatory organizations are funded by the industry, but remain independent, with the intent of upholding the standards or codes like the Advertising Standards Authority in the UK.

In the UK, most forms of outdoor advertising, are regulated by the UK Town and County Planning system. The display of some advertisements without consent is a criminal offence liable to a fine of £2,500. In the US, where some communities believe that outdoor advertising is a blight on some landscapes, attempts to ban billboard advertising occurred in the 1960s, leading to the Highway Beautification Act. Cities such as São Paulo have introduced an outright ban.

Some governments restrict the languages that can be used in advertisements, but advertisers may employ tactics to try to avoid them. In France for instance, advertisers sometimes print English words in bold and French translations in fine print to deal with Article 120 of the 1994 Toubon Law limiting the use of English.

The advertising of pricing information is another topic of concern for governments. In the United States for instance, it is common for businesses to only mention the existence and amount of applicable taxes at a later stage of a transaction. In Canada and New Zealand, taxes can be listed as separate items, as long as they are quoted up-front. In most other countries, the advertised price must include all applicable taxes, enabling customers to easily know how much it will cost them.

== Gender interpretation and portrayal ==
According to a 1977 study by David Statt, females process information comprehensively, while males process information through heuristic devices such as procedures, methods or strategies for solving problems, which could effect how they interpret advertising. Men prefer to have cues to interpret the message, whereas females engage in more creative, associative and imagery-laced interpretation. Later research found that advertising attempts to persuade men to improve their appearance or performance, whereas its approach to women aims at transformation towards an impossible ideal of female presentation.

Paul Suggett's article "The Objectification of Women in Advertising" discusses the negative impact of portraying unrealistic ideals of female beauty in advertisements on women, as well as men. Studies show that these expectations on women and young girls can negatively affect their views about their bodies and appearance, although others disagree with these findings. There are some companies like Dove that are creating commercials to portray more natural women and all forms of beauty, via their Campaign for Real Beauty.

Research by Martin in 2003 revealed that males and females react differently to advertising depending on their mood at the time of ad exposure and the tone of the advertising. When feeling sad, males prefer happy ads to boost their mood. In contrast, females prefer happy ads when they are feeling happy. Susan Wojcicki, author of the article "Ads that Empower Women don't just Break Stereotypes—They're also Effective" discusses how advertising to women has changed since the first Barbie commercial, where a little girl tells the doll that, she wants to be just like her.

== "Fathers" of advertising ==
- Late 1700s – Benjamin Franklin (1706–1790) – "father of advertising in America"
- Late 1800s – Thomas J. Barratt (1841–1914) of London – called "the father of modern advertising" by T.F.G. Coates
- Early 1900s – J. Henry ("Slogan") Smythe Jr of Philadelphia – "world's best known slogan writer"
- Early 1900s – Albert Lasker (1880–1952) – the "father of modern advertising"; defined advertising as "salesmanship in print, driven by a reason why"

== Influential thinkers in advertising theory and practice ==
- Francis Ayer (1848-1923) – established N. W. Ayer & Son, probably the first advertising agency to use mass media (i.e. telegraph) in a promotional campaign
- James Walter Thompson (1847-1928) – founder of the J. Walter Thompson advertising agency
- Claude C. Hopkins (1866–1932) – popularised the use of test campaigns, especially coupons in direct mail, to track the efficiency of marketing spend
- Charles Coolidge Parlin (1872–1942) – regarded as the pioneer of the use of marketing research in advertising
- E. St. Elmo Lewis (1872–1948) – developed the first hierarchy of effects model (AIDA) used in sales and advertising
- Daniel Starch (1883–1979) – developed the Starch score method of measuring print media effectiveness (still in use)
- Arthur Nielsen (1897–1980) – founded one of the earliest international advertising agencies (NielsenIQ) and developed ratings for radio & TV
- Rosser Reeves (1910–1984) – developed the concept of the unique selling proposition (USP) and advocated the use of repetition in advertising
- Ernest Dichter (1907–1991) – developed the field of motivational research, used extensively in advertising
- David Ogilvy (1911–1999) – founder and executive of Ogilvy, pioneered the positioning concept and advocated the use of brand image in advertising
- Al Ries (1926–2022) – advertising executive, author and credited with coining the term "positioning" in the late 1960s

== See also ==
- Advertisements in schools – Societal debate
- Advertorial – Advertisement disguised as editorial
- Ambush marketing – Type of marketing strategy
- Annoyance factor – Aspect of advertising
- Bibliography of advertising
- Branded content – Entertainment product funded by an advertiser
- Commercial speech – Speech on behalf of a business
- Comparative advertising – Type of advertising
- Conquesting – Display of an ad near content about a competitor]
- Copywriting – Writing text for the purpose of advertising or marketing
- Demo mode – Consumer electronic feature
- Direct-to-consumer advertising – Promotion of medical products directly to consumers
- False advertising – Misleading content in advertisements
- Family in advertising – Advertising trope
- Graphic design – Interdisciplinary branch of design and fine arts
- Gross rating point – Marketing measurement metric
- Guerrilla marketing – Unconventional advertising strategy
- History of Advertising Trust – British advertising archive and charity
- Informative advertising – Advertising carried out in a factual manner
- Integrated marketing communications – Marketing channels and tools used together
- List of advertising awards
- Local advertising
- Media planning – Selection of media platforms for a marketing campaign
- Meta-advertising – Hybrid form of advertising
- Mobile marketing – Multi-channel online marketing technique
- Performance-based advertising – Advertising model
- Promotional mix – Blend of promotional variables for marketing purposes
- Senior media creative – Designation in various creative industries
- Shock advertising – Advertising method
- Surrogate advertising – Method of indirect advertising
- Viral marketing – Marketing strategy that uses existing social networks to promote a product
- World Federation of Advertisers – Global trade association for advertisers
