= Conquesting =

Display of an ad near content about a competitor

Conquesting, as used in the advertising industry, is a means to deploy an advertisement for one's products or services adjacent to editorial content relating to the competitor or the competitor's products.

A common practice is to purchase advertisements in magazines and newspapers where editors and reporters write about the products or company. The goal is to reinforce the marketing message and earn even greater levels of awareness and recall of the brand. Generally, getting the advertisement as close to the editorial content is considered important to maximize the awareness effects.

Conquesting injects a competitive advertisement at the moment of editorial presentation and seeks to usurp or disrupt the reinforcement process. Some publishers reject the notion and allow the editorialized advertiser to match the fee and retain advertisement-editorial integrity.

== Paid search conquesting ==
Paid search conquesting is a strategy whereby a brand or company intentionally bids on search terms or keywords directly related to a competitor. It is typically used to gain brand exposure or to gain consumers interest over a competitor. However, using trademarks that are not one's own is forbidden by Google, and pushing paid search conquesting to that extreme can negatively impact the CTR and quality score.

Paid search conquesting is a controversial tactic in the pay-per-click world because it has been notoriously used as a way to start bidding wars. The most negative outcomes of paid search conquesting during a bidding war can result in threats to brand visibility and increase in CPC costs. The positive aspects of paid search conquesting in the form of competitor keyword bidding as a strategy include an increase in brand visibility, engagement of "at-risk" searches, and provision of better results for remarketing lists.

== Examples of conquesting ==
In 1997, Northern Telecom announced Nortel Power Networks, a marketing initiative focused on reinforcing the unifying attributes of the portfolio of enterprise products the company offered at the time. Not more than a month later, Cisco introduced the Cisco-Powered Network, a partner co-branding, where if a service provider purchases some minimum quantity of Cisco product they would be eligible for co-marketing funds.

In this way, Cisco marketers used conquesting to neutralize the brand effect of the Northern Telecom marketing initiative.

== See also ==
- Market overhang
