= Film production incentives in the United States =

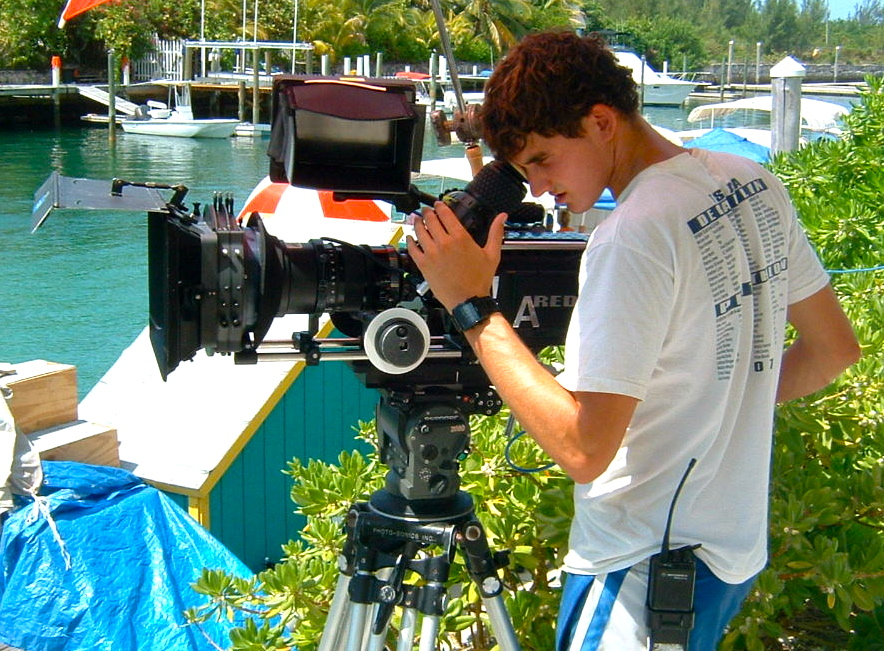
Many states provide financial incentives for film and television production.

Film production incentives are strategies used by states to encourage filming within their jurisdictions. The most sought-after form of incentive are direct payments made by the state to a film's production company with the stipulation that a set amount of money, often far larger than the incentive payment, will be spent in that state.

Such incentives are desirable to film producers because they not only offset costs that would otherwise be borne by the private capital that funds most large productions but also because state governments generally do not demand profit participation or residual payments in exchange for their financial support. Such schemes are an indirect form of government subsidy for workers and business-owners in the state issuing the incentive.

Because these direct payments are routed through and paid by a state's tax bureaucracy they are often called "tax credits". Although conventional tax rebates are offered by some states, the most common, and attractive, form of "tax incentive" remains direct state payment to film production companies.

Since the 1990s, states have offered increasingly competitive incentives to lure productions away from other states. The structure, type, and size of the incentives vary from state to state with most offering cash grants, tax credits and exemptions, as well as other incentives such as fee-free locations.

Proponents of these programs point to increased economic activity and job creation as justification for the credits. Others argue that the cost of the incentives outweighs the benefits and say that the money goes primarily to out-of-state talent rather than in-state cast and crew members.

Studies show that tax incentives for movie and television productions have low overall economic effects, with low rates of return for states that offer the incentives.

== History ==
In the 1990s, U.S. states saw the opportunity to launch their own production incentives as an effort to capture some of the perceived economic benefits of film and TV production. Louisiana was the first state to do so in 2001, and in 2002 passed legislation to further increase the scope its incentives. Over the next three years Louisiana experienced an increase in film and television productions some of which were nominated for Emmy Awards. The perceived success of Louisiana's incentive program did not go unnoticed by other states, and by 2009 the number of states which offered incentives was 44, up from 5 in 2002. Critics have suggested that the increase in states offering incentives mirrors a race to the bottom or an arms race because states continue to increase the scope of their incentive packages to compete on a national level to not only maximize their individual benefits but also to stay ahead of their competitors.

In 2013, Los Angeles mayor Eric Garcetti appointed former Motion Picture Academy president Tom Sherak as the city's first "film czar" to advocate the state on behalf of the city for more favorable movie production incentives, an office then held by entertainment attorney Ken Ziffren.

== Types ==
- Movie Production Incentives (MPIs): "Movie Production Incentive" is any incentive states offer filmmakers to encourage film production in-state.
- Tax Credits: Tax credits can remove a portion of the income tax owed to the state by the production company, but since most production companies are limited purpose business entities they often incur very little, if any tax liability. The use of the word "tax credit" or "tax rebate" often results in public confusion, as they layperson may think the program is a refund of taxes paid by the production, when it is actually based on a significant percentage of the production's actual spend and the amount is awarded regardless of whether the entity pays taxes (which they generally do not) (as explained by Louisiana's Chief Legislative Economist: "It's got nothing to do with tax...We're just using the tax-filing process and the Department of Revenue as the paying agent for a spending program. That's what we're doing.") Production companies must often meet minimum spending requirements to be eligible for the credit. Of the 28 states that offer tax credits, 26 make them either transferable or refundable. Transferable credits allow production companies that generate tax credits greater than their tax liability to sell those credits to other taxpayers, who then use them to reduce or eliminate their own tax liability. Refundable credits are such that the state will pay the production company the balance in excess of the company's owed state tax.
- Cash Rebates: Cash rebates are paid to production companies directly by the state, usually as a percentage of the company's qualified expenses.
- Grant: Grants are distributed to production companies by three states and the District of Columbia.
- Sales Tax Exemption & Lodging Exemption: Exemption from state sales taxes are offered to companies as an incentive. Many states offer exemption from lodging taxes to all guests staying over 30 days, but these incentives are highlighted for production companies.
- Fee-Free Locations: An additional incentive states offer is to allow production companies to use state-owned locations at no charge.

== State-by-state ==
States offering movie production incentives by type as of December 2009

	MPIs	Tax credit (base)	Cash rebate	Grant	Sales tax exemption	Lodging exemption	Fee-free Locations
Alabama	X	25%			X	X	
Alaska	100% local hire	30%	80% transportation		(No tax)		
Arizona*AZ	X				X		X
Arkansas	X	20%	X				
California	X	X			X	X	X
Colorado	X		X			X	
Connecticut	X	X			X	X	
Delaware					(No tax)		
Florida	X		X		X		
Georgia*GA	X	X			X		
Hawaii*HI	X	20%					
Idaho	X		X		X	X	
Illinois	X	X				X	
Indiana	X	X				X	
Iowa*IA	X	X				X	X
Kansas	X	X				X	
Kentucky	X	X			X	X	
Louisiana*LA	X	25%					
Maine*ME	X		X		X	X	X
Maryland	X		X		X	X	X
Massachusetts*MA	X	25%			X		
Michigan	X	X	X			X	
Minnesota	X		X		X	X	
Mississippi	X		X		X		
Missouri	X	X					
Montana	X	X			(No tax)	X	
Nebraska						X	
Nevada		(No tax)				X	
New Hampshire		(No tax)			(No tax)		
New Jersey	X	X			X	X	
New Mexico*NM	X	25%			X	X	
New York	X	X			X		
North Carolina	X	X			X	X	
North Dakota						X	
Ohio*OH	X	X				X	
Oklahoma	X		X		X		
Oregon	X		X		(No tax)	X	
Pennsylvania*PA	X	25%				X	X
Rhode Island	X	X					
South Carolina	X		X		X	X	X
South Dakota	X	(No tax)	X		X	X	
Tennessee	X	X		X	X	X	
Texas	X	(No tax)	X	X	X	X	
Utah	X	X	X		X	X	
Vermont					X	X	
Virginia	X			X	X	X	
Washington	X	(No tax)	X		X	X	
West Virginia	X	X			X	X	X
Wisconsin	X	30%			X		
Wyoming	X	(No tax)	X			X	
District of Columbia	X			X			
Puerto Rico	X	X			X	X	
Total states	44	28	17	3	28	33	6

*GA - Georgia has transferable tax credits, meaning that production can sell tax credit to the state's taxpayers. Rates run at 20% on certified expenditures, including nonresident compensation, with an added 10% if the production holds end credit/exceptional GA promotional material. Basically, most productions are qualified for 30% total rate. Not applying to payments made to loan-outs, there is an individual compensation cap of $500k, which is also the minimum spend number. Unlike MA, there is no required final certification process, but the state offers a "verification review" at $55/hour per state auditor. This insulates purchasers of certified credits from recapture.

*HI - This tropical state offers refundable tax credits where production receives a cash refund after filing tax return. This state's rates are 20% on certified production expenditures with a 5% extra credit for production in counties outside of Honolulu County. $15M is the tax credit cap per production with a minimum spend number of $200k. Many expenditures involving, and subject to, Hawaii tax are eligible. This includes the cost of flights and shipping equipment to and from Hawaii.

*IA - As of November 24, 2009, Iowa has suspended new registration for incentives pending a criminal investigation into the handling of past film tax credits.

*LA - The state of Louisiana has redeemable tax credit where production can exchange tax credit for cash at an excellent rate of 88% of the tax credits earned after paying for the transfer fees. With a 25% base rate on certified production expenditures, there is a 5% increase to the base rate if over 60% of production takes place outside of metro New Orleans. These area-oriented rules should be thoroughly researched before addressing redeemable tax credits. Louisiana has a $150M annual reservation cap, which can possibly allocate from future years (if exhausted). Additionally, there is a $180M annual cap on tax credits held with the state. These events can unfortunately delay the monetization of credits.

*MA - In Massachusetts, the field of production can sell tax credits to MA taxpayers. On the flip-side, you can restore tax credit with the State for cash. That rate is 90% of the tax credits collected. This is known as transferable and redeemable tax credit. Regarding rates, production receives 25% on qualified production expenditures, which includes nonresident rectification. The cap for individual compensation is $1M. But if you do half of your principal photography days or half of your total production expenditures in MA, there is no cap. The minimum spend is $50K. Additionally, independent CPA cost verification is required, and you cannot earn credits with the state after transferring them to another individual or entity. Sales tax exemption for production expenditures is also available.

*ME - Maine's wage rebate is effectively a cash rebate and is considered as such in this table.

*NM - In New Mexico, the type of incentive is refundable tax credit, so production obtains a cash refund after submitting tax return. This states rates include: 25% on certified production expenditures for film;30% certified production expenditures for television;30% regarding resident BTL crewmembers when working in a qualified production facility;and 15% on nonresident BTL crewmember compensation (when meeting many conditions, like a high level of production activity). The annual claims cap in NM is $50M, and the minimum spend number is $500k for TV/features while the minimum for music videos/soundtracks is $50K.

*OH - This Midwestern state offers production companies refundable tax credit which can be traded for a cash refund after filing tax return on certified production expenditures with an annual cap of $50M. This yearly program cap is reserved by application. The minimum spend number for Ohio is $300K and, like most states, loan-outs must be registered with the state.

*PA - Pennsylvania has transferable tax credit where production can sell tax credit to PA taxpayers. Rates are 25% on certified production expenditures and 5% credit added to those expenditures if using a qualified facility and meeting other requirements. The annual cap is reserved by application, set at $65m, with a $15m aggregate ATL compensation cap. The minimum spend number for PA is 60% of the PA expenditure budget.

*WI - In July 2025, Wisconsin reinstated its film and television production incentive program and re-established a state film office. The program provides a 30 percent transferable tax credit on qualified in-state expenditures, applicable to productions that spend money on Wisconsin vendors and resident crew. The incentive is designed to encourage economic activity within the state and takes effect in January 2026.

== Economic impact ==
Studies show that tax incentives and subsidies for movie productions have low overall economic effects, with low rates of return for states that offer the incentives.

Proponents of production incentives for the film industry argue that it increases job creation, small business and infrastructure development, tourism, and tax revenue generated. Tax incentives in Georgia were also credited with increasing the membership of entertainment-related labor unions in that state. Although film tourism has sometimes been cited as a possible example of film and television tax incentives, claimed examples of the phenomenon tend to be anecdotal and there is no reliable method for measurement.

Overall economic losses to the US due to runaway productions are difficult to measure, as the perceived economic benefit of film production could include benefits from tourism in the short and long-term, local job creation, and any number of other benefits. Most methods of measuring such economic benefit apply a multiplier to production costs in order to account for the lost opportunities from taxes not collected, jobs not created, and other revenues that are lost when a film is made outside of the US. A 1999 study by The Monitor Group estimated that in 1998 $10.3 billion was lost to the US economy due to runaway productions.

Movie production incentives do not necessarily result in the creation of jobs. Rather, the economic impact is that of a transfer of jobs from one location or state to another. Additionally, unless the state in question has a consistent stream of productions, the project-based nature of the film and television industry generates short-term jobs that eventually leave specialized laborers out of work.

States have a tendency to use vague language and refer to successes in other states when advocating in support of production incentives. Critics maintain that information is selected to present positive results, and that states rely too heavily on perceived successes in other states without adequately considering how available resources within the state will impact their respective economies. States often incorrectly use economic measurements, such as a multiplier or an increase in different types of tax revenue, to promote film tax credits. When comparing multipliers across different projects, movie production incentive multipliers tend to be smaller than those for other investment projects (e.g. nuclear power plant, hotels). Revenue from alternate taxes not covered under tax credit policies do not always cover the original cost of the given film tax incentives.

Politicians focus on immediate, short-term projects because it is politically easier to change these incentive policies. However, a focus on improving baseline tax policies to incentivize long-term private investment in industry would lead to higher levels of job creation, productivity and economic development.

Critics of MPIs include the Tax Foundation, which published a 2010 study saying that MPIs "have often escaped routine oversight about benefits, costs and activities" and favor a politically connected industry over other industries. Critics propose that unilateral or multilateral moratoriums and federal intervention be used to solve economic inefficiencies created by MPIs. For example, in a 2009 article, entertainment attorney Schuyler M. Moore proposed a federal tax credit combined with complete federal preemption of all state-level tax credits in order to halt the states' race into insolvency.

== Content conditions ==
Some states that grant significant MPIs have content requirements, limiting grants to films that portray the state in a positive light to benefit state travel and tourism departments. Hawaii's MPI program offers one-third more funding to productions that include "Hawaiian terminology in the title" or that promote "Hawaiian scenery, culture, or products" in the film. The Tax Foundation argues that "Requiring films to pass a sensitivity test before being granted a credit subsidizes government-approved opinion with taxpayer dollars" and constitutes "some degree of censorship." New Mexico bars films with an R rating from receiving credits unless the Private Equity Investment Advisory Committee, a politically appointed board, deems the film "acceptable"; the state committee barred movies deemed culturally insensitive or sexually explicit from receiving tax credits.

== State-by-state cost-benefit analysis ==
Some states have attempted to evaluate the economic impact of their movie production incentives to establish whether the benefits outweigh the costs.

=== Connecticut ===
In 2008, the Connecticut Department of Economic and Community Development released a report on the economic impacts of the state's film production tax incentive program. The report concludes the tax incentive program has a "modest" impact on the state's economy, returning $1.07 of real gross state product (RSGP) for every dollar spent (or tax revenue dollar foregone). The report also finds that the program in FY2007 stimulated $55.1 million in film production spending, generated $20.72 million in new RGSP, and created 395 full-time equivalent (FTE) jobs.

An analyst at the Federal Reserve Bank of Boston reached a different conclusion when reviewing the tax incentive program in 2009, finding that the program does not pay for itself and that the economic benefits are short-lived and easily lost if the program is discontinued.

In the face of 2011 budget shortfalls, Connecticut state legislators are considering ending the tax incentive program to balance the budget.

=== Massachusetts ===
In January 2011, the Massachusetts Department of Revenue released its third annual report detailing the impact of the state's film tax incentive program, specifically focusing on the productions and tax credits of 2009.

The report's key findings for 2009 showed:

- 86 productions generated $82.4 million in state tax credits.
- The film tax incentive program generated $10.4 million in new tax revenue, partially offsetting the cost of the tax credits.
- Productions spent $310 million in new spending attributable to the tax credit program.
- Accounting for production spending going to in-state people and businesses versus out-of-state people and businesses, the film tax credit program resulted in $32.6 million in new spending for the Massachusetts economy.
- The film tax incentive program generated additional Massachusetts state GDP of $168.5 million and personal income of $25.2 million.
- The cost to the state for the jobs created by the film tax credit program was $324,838/FTE job.

At a 2011 legislative hearing on the film tax credit program, policy analysts from Massachusetts think tanks criticized the film tax incentive program. Critics have also complained that much of the tax credit money goes to cover the pay of celebrity actors. Debate within state government over the value of the tax credits in the face of budget shortfalls led Governor Deval Patrick to attempt to cap the tax credit in 2010. Although this effort was not successful, some point to it as a reason for a decline in film productions in Massachusetts in recent years.

=== Michigan ===
A September 2010 report by the Michigan Senate Fiscal Agency detailed the economics underlying the state's incentive programs. In particular it found that:

- Michigan spent $37.5 million in FY2008-09 to generate $21.1 million in private sector spending, and would go on to spend $100.0 million in FY2009-10 to generate $59.5 million.
- 2008 productions created 216 direct, full-time-equated (FTE) jobs, or 937.3 FTEs if indirect effects (via multipliers) are taken into account. The jobs came at an average cost of $186.519 and $42,991, respectively. Similarly, in 2009, 355.5 direct FTEs were created at an average cost of $193,333 or, again if indirect effects are considered, 1,542.3 FTEs were created at a cost of $44,561.
- Taken together, the report concludes that the net revenue impact on the state was a cost of $30.8 million in FY2008-09, $91.4 million in FY2009-10, $111.8 million in FY 2010–11, and likely to continue to increase over time.

=== New York ===
New York provides major subsidies for the film industry. In fiscal year 2017 New York gave out $621 million in tax breaks for film and TV shoots that take place in the empire state. This works out to $31 a year in per capita. Season two of Madam Secretary received $21,217,413 in state aid.

In 2023, the Eric Adams administration made an agreement to allow a film studio to open on prime real estate at Pier 94, a pier in the Hell's Kitchen neighborhood of Midtown Manhattan. The agreement entailed that the film studio would pay no property tax and that the location could be rented for far lower rent than what tenants pay at neighboring piers. The city would also contribute tens of millions of dollars to maintaining the pier.

=== Rhode Island ===
Supporters of the film tax credit in Rhode Island are urging state officials to maintain the program, pointing to a study showing the program created more than 4,000 jobs in the state between 2006 and 2009. Critics of the program say the ubiquity of incentives in most states have diminished Rhode Island's competitive advantage and that the funds would be better spent elsewhere.
