= Overhang =

Overhang may refer to:

- Debt overhang, a fiscal situation of a government
- Market overhang, a concept in marketing
- Monetary overhang, a phenomenon where people have money holdings due to the lack of ability to spend them
- Overhang (architecture), a protruding structure that may provide protection for lower levels, such as overhanging eaves
- Overhang (automotive), the part of a road vehicle's length that is outside of the wheelbase
- Overhang (rock formation), part of a rock face that exceeds the vertical
- Overhang seat, a constituency seat in excess of a party's entitlement

== See also ==
- Underhang
