= ShopTV Canada =

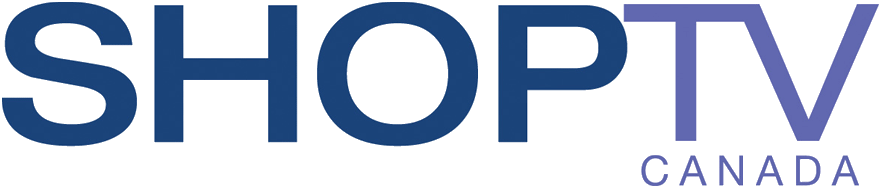
- ShopTV Canada logo
- Country: Canada
- Broadcast area: National
- Headquarters: Toronto, Ontario

Programming
- Picture format: 480i (SDTV)

Ownership
- Owner: Torstar Media Group Television

History
- Launched: 1996
- Closed: November 2013
- Former names: Direct To You (1996 – 1997); Toronto Star TV (1997 - 2003)

Links
- Website: ShopTV Canada

ShopTV Canada was a Canadian English language cable television direct response television shopping service owned by Torstar Media Group Television.

== Programming ==
ShopTV Canada featured direct response advertising in short and long form with lengths ranging from 30 seconds to 28.5 minutes from a wide range of categories including automotive, beauty & personal care, entertainment, health & fitness, home improvement, and real estate.

One of the more notable infomercials aired on the channel was the Magic Bullet.

== History ==
The channel was launched in 1996 by Rogers Cable under the name Direct To You, with the tagline "The Infomercial Channel".

In March 1997, Torstar announced that it would purchase the channel from Rogers Cable for $1.7 million, with the intention of rebranding the channel to align it with the Toronto Star newspaper, the flagship brand of Torstar Corporation.

In October 1997, Torstar renamed the network Toronto Star TV. While under the direction of Rogers Cable, the channel exclusively aired infomercials, however, with the name change to Toronto Star TV, Torstar injected news and information into its schedule, blurring the lines between a shopping channel and a news channel. This was done so in an effort to boost subscriptions to the Toronto Star, by offering a glimpse of what readers could expect from the newspaper itself. The channel also began producing in-house infomercial content for third party clients.

In April 2003, Torstar rebranded the network, this time as ShopTV Canada, in an effort to better reflect the type of programming the channel broadcasts.

Logo while under the name Toronto Star TV

On November 6, 2013, it was noted that the channel had been shut down either that day or very shortly before. On Rogers' cable systems in the Toronto area (the only providers carrying it at that point), its channel position was replaced for digital cable customers with a free-preview channel (initially carrying Nickelodeon), and was not replaced for analog customers, although its slot is now occupied by WGRZ Buffalo in some areas.

== Licensing ==
ShopTV Canada was classified as a teleshopping service by the Canadian Radio-television and Telecommunications Commission (CRTC), and thus, was exempted from requiring a CRTC-issued licence to operate and most other CRTC requirements to which pay TV and specialty channels are subject.
