= Richard Laermer =

Richard Laermer (born September 16, 1961, in Queens, New York) is the author of eight books and CEO of RLM Public Relations, a PR firm he founded in January 1991. He has lived in New York City, Connecticut, and La Quinta, California.

Laermer's book, Full Frontal PR has been used as a text in public relations courses at universities including Georgia Southern, and he is quoted as a reference on public relations, marketing effectiveness, marketing strategy, consumerism, political strategy, advertising and "no comment."

Laermer's Native's Guide to New York was listed as a "top three NYC travel guide" by The Guardian in 2005.

On November 8, 2007, Laermer was inducted into the PR News Hall of Fame.

== Bibliography ==
- 2011: Trendspotting for the Next Decade (2008; McGraw-Hill)
- Punk Marketing: Get Off Your Ass and Join the Revolution, co-authored with Mark Simmons (author) (2007; HarperCollins) (2009)
- Full Frontal PR: Building Buzz About Your Business, Your Product, or You (2003; Bloomberg Press) (2004)
- Native's Guide to New York: Advice With Attitude for People Who Live Here—And Visitors We Like (2002; W. W. Norton & Company) (2001) (2000) (1999) (1998)
- Trendspotting: Think Forward, Get Ahead, Cash in on the Future (2002; Perigee Trade)
- Get on with It: The Gay and Lesbian Guide to Getting Online (1997; Broadway Books)
- Gay and Lesbian Guide to New York City (1994; Plume)
- Bargain Hunting in Greater New York (1990; Prima Lifestyles)
