= In-flight advertising =

In-flight advertising is advertising that targets potential consumers aboard an airplane. It includes commercials during in-flight entertainment programming, advertisements in in-flight magazines or on Boarding Passes, ads on seatback tray tables and overhead storage bins, and sales pitches by flight attendants. Ads can be tailored to the traveler's destination, or several of the airlines destinations, promoting local restaurants, hotels, businesses and shopping.

== Evolution ==
Inflight advertising began in onboard magazines as a way to increase ancillary revenue for airlines and pay for inflight content. Today, inflight advertising is set to increase as airlines are investing heavily in content and connectivity and utilizing media sales to offset costs.

In 2017 Virgin America aired the first-ever cannabis related advertisement across its video display network during inflight entertainment breaks.

== Statistics ==
According to surveys by QMedia:

- 85% of long-distance travellers recalled some type of inflight advertising or promotional material. The figures were higher for business class and high frequency passengers.
- 86% of customers are flying in a positive mood, and are hence more likely to be receptive to advertising messages.
- On flights of over an hour, 9 out of 10 airline passengers used their tray for 15 minutes or more. In short flights of an hour or less, the figure stood at 82%
- 92% of airline passengers were still able to recall advertising messages a few hours after arrival.

== Boarding passes advertising ==
Boarding pass advertising relies on the use of targeted advertising technologies. When the passenger checks on-line he has the possibility to click on the various ads and suggestions suggested on the boarding pass. When travelers print their boarding passes, the ads will automatically be printed, too. Fliers can, however, click a box to prevent the ads from being printed if the company is so compassionate as to allow it.

The ads are used by airlines to increase revenue and for advertisers to target travelers down to their departure city and destination. Sojern was one of the first companies to partner with such airlines as Delta Air Lines to offer boarding pass advertising technology.

== Criticism ==
In-flight advertising has come under fire for being too intrusive, as it has expanded "to offset rising fuel costs and other operating expenses." A 2005 article in the Washington Post called passengers "captive customers," accusing airlines of being "aggressive pitchmen for a range of products to passengers at 30,000 feet." Moreover, targeted advertising used on boarding passes has been cited as a breach of privacy.
