= Bibliography of advertising =

This is a bibliography of advertising.

== General ==
- Bhatia, Tej K. 2007. Advertising and marketing in rural India. Macmillan India.
- Bhatia, Tej K. 2000. Advertising in Rural India: Language, Marketing Communication, and Consumerism. Institute for the Study of Languages and Cultures of Asia and Africa. Tokyo University of Foreign Studies. Tokyo Press: Japan. ISBN 4-87297-782-3
- Arthur Richards, Kent US (2008) Teacher, Pirate, renaissance man
- Clark, Eric, "The Want Makers", Viking, 1988. ISBN 0-340-32028-1
- Cook, Guy (2001 2nd edition) "The Discourse of Advertising", London: Routledge, ISBN 0-415-23455-7
- Graydon, Shari (2003) "Made You Look - How Advertising Works and Why You Should Know", Toronto: Annick Press, ISBN 1-55037-814-7
- Johnson, J. Douglas, "Advertising Today", Chicago: Science Research Associates, 1978. ISBN 0-574-19355-3
- Kaiser, Ulrich; Song, Minjae (2009). "Do media consumers really dislike advertising? An empirical assessment of the role of advertising in print media markets" (PDF). International Journal of Industrial Organization. 27 (2): 292–301. doi:10.1016/j.ijindorg.2008.09.003. S2CID 154441045.
- Kleppner, Otto, "Advertising Procedure", Englewood Cliffs, N.J., Prentice-Hall, 1966.
- Kotabe, Masaki and Kristiaan Helsen, Global Marketing Management, 3rd Edition, John Wiley & Sopns, Inc, publishers, Copyright 2004, ISBN 0-471-23062-6
- Laermer, Richard; Simmons, Mark, Punk Marketing, New York: Harper Collins, 2007. ISBN 978-0-06-115110-1 (Review of the book by Marilyn Scrizzi, in Journal of Consumer Marketing 24(7), 2007)
- Lears, Jackson, Fables of Abundance: A Cultural History of Advertising in America, Basic Books, 1995, ISBN 0-465-09075-3
- Leon, Jose Luis (1996) "Los effectos de la publicidad". Barcelona: Ariel, ISBN 84-344-1266-7
- Leon, Jose Luis (2001) "Mitoanálisis de la publicidad". Barcelona. Ariel, ISBN 84-344-1285-3
- McFall, Liz, Advertising: A Cultural Economy, Thousand Oaks, CA: Sage Publications Inc., 2004. ISBN 0-7619-4255-6
- Mulvihill, Donald F., "Marketing Research for the Small Company", Journal of Marketing, Vol. 16, No. 2, Oct., 1951, pp. 179–183.
- Packard, Vance, The Hidden Persuaders, New York, D. McKay Co., 1957.
- Petley, Julian (2002) "Advertising". North Mankato, Minnesota: Smart Apple Media, ISBN 1-58340-255-1
- Young, Charles E., The Advertising Handbook, Ideas in Flight, Seattle, WA April 2005, ISBN 0-9765574-0-1
- Wernick, Andrew (1991) "Promotional Culture: Advertising, Ideology and Symbolic Expression (Theory, Culture & Society S.)", London: Sage Publications Ltd, ISBN 0-8039-8390-5
- West, Nancy M. Kodak and the Lens of Nostalgia (2000) Charlottesville: University of Virginia Press

== Critics ==
- Achbar, Mark (editor), Manufacturing consent : Noam Chomsky and the media: the companion book to the award-winning film by Peter Wintonick and Mark Achbar, Montreal; New York: Black Rose Books, 1994. ISBN 1-55164-003-1
- Baines, Paul. (2001) "A Pie in the Face" in Alternatives Journal, Spring 2001 v. 27 i. 2 p. 14. Retrieved: InfoTrac Web: Expanded Academic ASAP plus. (24/07/2002).
- Boiler, David in: Silent Theft. The Private Plunder of Our Common Wealth, Routledge, New York, February 2003, ISBN 978-0-415-94482-3, ISBN 0-415-94482-1
- Chomsky, Noam, (edited by Peter R. Mitchell and John Schoeffel) Understanding Power: The Indispensable Chomsky, New York: The New Press, 2002. Cf. "An Exchange on Manufacturing Consent"
- De Certeau, Michel. (1984) The Practice of Everyday Life. Berkeley, London: University of California Press.
- Fraser, Nancy. (2000) "Rethinking the Public Sphere: A contribution to the critique of actually existing democracy" in S. During (ed), The Cultural Studies Reader. London and New York: Routledge.
- Goldman, Debra. (1999) "Consumer Republic" in Adweek.Com, Nov 22, 1999 v36 i47 p13. Retrieved: www.adweek.com (8/08/2002).
- Habermas, Jürgen. (c1989) The Structural Transformation of the Public Sphere: an Inquiry into a Category of Bourgeois Society. Cambridge, Mass.: MIT Press.
- Harkin, James. (1996) "The Logos Fight Back" in New Statesman, June 18, 2001 v130 i4542 p 25. Retrieved: InfoTrac Web: Expanded Academic ASAP plus. (8/08/2002).
- Hodge, R. and Kress, G. (1988) Social Semiotics. Cambridge: Polity Press.
- Holt, D. (2002) "Why Brands Cause Trouble? A dialectical theory of Consumer Culture and Branding" in Journal of Consumer Research, June 2002 v29 i1 p 70(21). Retrieved: InfoTrac Web: Expanded Academic ASAP plus. (29/07/2002).
- Horkheimer, Max and Adorno, Theodor W. (1973) Dialectic of Enlightenment. London: Allen Lane.
- Jhully, Sut. (2006) The Spectacle of Accumulation. Essays in Media. Culture & Politics, Peter Lang Publishing (June 24, 2006), ISBN 0-8204-7904-7, ISBN 978-0-8204-7904-0
- Jhully, Sut (1990) The Codes of Advertising: Fetishism and the political Economy of Meaning, Routledge; 1 edition (December 12, 1990), ISBN 0-415-90353-X, ISBN 978-0-415-90353-0
- Jhully, Sut, Leiss, William, Kline, Stephen, Botterill, Jacqueline (2005): Social Communication in Advertising: Consumption in the Mediated Marketplace, Routledge; 3 edition (September 28, 2005), ISBN 0-415-96676-0, ISBN 978-0-415-96676-4
- Kilbourne, Jean: Can't Buy My Love: How Advertising Changes the Way We Think and Feel, Free Press; 1 edition (November 2, 2000), ISBN 0-684-86600-5
- Klein, Naomi. (2000) No Logo: Taking Aim at the Brand Bullies. New York: Picador, ISBN 0-312-20343-8
- Korten, David. (1995) When Corporations Rule the World. 2. Edition 2001: Berrett-Koehler, San Francisco, California, ISBN 1-887208-04-6
- Lasch, Christopher. The Culture of Narcissism: American Life in an Age of Diminishing Expectations, Norton, New York, ISBN 978-0-393-30738-2
- Lasn, Kalle. (2000) Culture Jam: how to reverse America's suicidal consumer binge - and why we must, Harper Paperbacks (November 7, 2000), ISBN 0-688-17805-7. ISBN 978-0-688-17805-5
- Lasn, Kalle. (1999) Culture Jam: The Uncooling of America, William Morrow & Company; 1st edition (November 1999), ISBN 0-688-15656-8
- Lees, Loretta, (1998) "Urban Renaissance and the Street" in Nicholas R. Fyfe (ed) Images of the Street: Planning, Identity and Control in Public Space. London; New York: Routledge.
- Leiss, William: (1990) Social Communication in Advertising, Routledge; 2 edition (July 27, 1990), ISBN 0-415-90354-8, ISBN 978-0-415-90354-7
- Lemke, Jay L. (1995) Textual Politics: Discourse and Social Dynamics. London: Taylor & Francis.
- Livingston, Sonia and Lunt, Peter. (1994) Talk on Television: Audience Participation and Public Debate. London & New York: Routledge.
- Louw, Eric. (2001) The Media and Cultural Production. London: Sage Publications.
- McChesney, Robert W., Stolzfus, Duane C. S. and Nerone, John C, (2007) Freedom from Advertising: E. W. Scripps's Chicago Experiment (History of Communication), Univ of Illinois Pr (March 30, 2007)
- McChesney, Robert W. “The Political Economy of Media: Enduring Issues, Emerging Dilemmas”. Monthly Review Press, New York, (May 1, 2008), ISBN 978-1-58367-161-0
- Prothers, Lisa (1998) Bad.eserver.org, "Culture Jamming: An Interview with Pedro Carvajal" in Bad Subjects: Political Education for Everyday Life, Issue #37, March 1998.
- Rorty, James: Our Master's Voice: Advertising Ayer Co Pub, 1976, ISBN 978-0-405-08044-9
- Sinclair, Upton (1919): The Brass Check
- Stuart, Ewen. Captains of Consciousness: Advertising and the Social Roots of the Consumer Culture, Basic Books, ISBN 978-0-465-02155-0, ISBN 0-465-02155-7
- Williamson, Judith (1994): Decoding Advertisements (Ideas in Progress), Marion Boyars Publishers Ltd (March 1, 1994), ISBN 0-7145-2615-0, ISBN 978-0-7145-2615-7
