= Meta-advertising =

Hybrid form of advertising

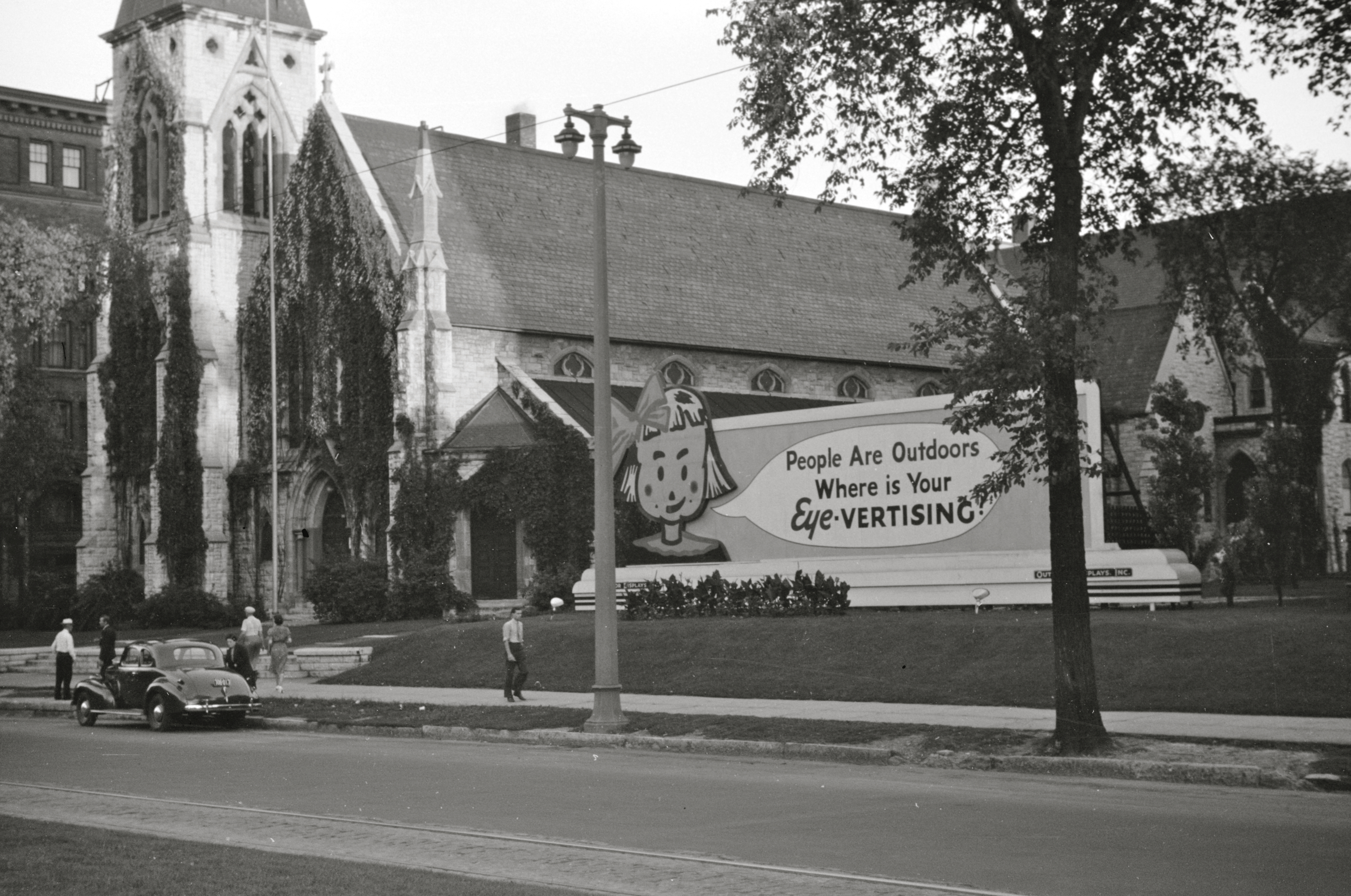
Meta-advertising on billboard c. 1939

Meta-advertising refers to a hybrid form of advertising, where the advertiser advertises for an advertisement. It can also be used for advertisements about advertising agencies.

== Advertisements about Advertisements ==
The most common definition of meta-advertising is an ad about an ad. This form of advertising was popular with Super Bowl advertising during the 2000s. Super Bowl ads and spots cost far more than regular ads. In American culture, the Super Bowl ads became highly anticipated. This often leads the companies to air ads encouraging viewers to watch the companies' upcoming Super Bowl ads, a form of meta-advertising.

Advertising about advertisements is a form of viral advertising, whereby advertisers seek to garner attention for their ad and therefore product.

Other examples include advertisements in one form of media, advertising for an ad in another medium. This could include a radio ad saying "Look in your Sunday paper for a free coupon."

== Advertising for Advertising Agencies ==
The term meta-advertising can also refer to advertisers advertising for themselves. This could include an advertisement for an ad agency.

Meta-advertising can also include ads which advertise for advertising. This is common with billboards, such as a billboard that says "A thousand people will pass by this billboard today. To advertise here call..."

== See also ==
- Self-reference
- Meta-
- Meta-reference
