= Sojern =

Big data companies

- Company type: Private
- Industry: Travel/Data Advertising
- Founded: Omaha, NE, September 2007
- Founder: Gordon Whitten
- Headquarters: San Francisco, CA
- Area served: Worldwide
- Key people: Mark Rabe (CEO); Aman Kothari (CFO); Noreen Henry (Chief Revenue Officer); Kurt Weinsheimer (Chief Solutions Officer); Preeya Patel (Chief People Officer); Paul Huie (SVP and General Counsel); John Moragne, Trident Capital, Board Director; Ellen Keszler, Clear Sky Associates, Board Director; Woody Marshall, TCV, Board Director
- Number of employees: 300+
- Subsidiaries: Adphorus, VenueLytics
- Website: sojern.com

Sojern is a marketing company specializing in services for the travel industry. It utilizes programmatic advertising and machine learning to assist travel businesses in identifying and targeting potential customers across various digital media channels.

Sojern operates globally, serving clients across the Americas, Europe, the Middle East, Africa, and Asia-Pacific. It has offices in cities such as San Francisco, Dubai, Dublin, London, Mexico City, Omaha, Paris, and Singapore.

From 2013 to 2018, Sojern was recognized by Deloitte as one of the Technology Fast 500 fastest-growing companies, reflecting its growth and influence in the travel marketing sector.

== History ==
Sojern was founded in 2007 by Gordon Whitten in Omaha, Nebraska. In April 2011, Yahoo! veteran Mark Rabe succeeded Whitten as CEO.

Sojern began as a boarding pass advertising company and was awarded U.S. Patent 8,131,502 for “providing customized or personalized content, relevant and timely messages and targeted advertising to travelers based on their destination and dates of travel.”

In 2011, Sojern released its media platform, the Sojern Traveler Platform (STP).

The company launched its first international office in London in 2013 and expanded to Mexico City, Dubai and Singapore in 2015.

== Funding ==
In 2016, Sojern announced they hit the $100 million annual revenue run rate threshold.
