= Media for equity =

Media for equity is a financing option that provides start-up companies with advertising such as television, print, radio, and online, in exchange for equity.

The idea is to help the start-up companies increase their metrics in a very short period of time; this way, instead of spending money on online marketing, they can use their financial resources to improve other aspects of their businesses. The companies receive advertising space instead of cash for their stock.

There are several other benefits one may consider raising media for equity funding including:

- access to preferential rates and the ability to influence the campaign planning,
- being accompanied by an experienced team that understands both worlds, the online performance approach, and the offline branding approach
- support regarding how to focus the campaign, PR, contacts, and know-how. Some investors such as UKTVN, Channel4 Ventures, ITV AdVentures in the UK also provide creative support
- the ability to raise larger financing rounds, focusing part of the capital on building long-term value.

With media for equity investments, start-ups can shift their cash spend away from above the line marketing and extend their runway. It's a great funding option often used during bridge rounds allowing founders to continue growing their business while preserving cash and reducing dependency on raising new rounds of funding.

Media for equity funds come in two different variants. The most prevalent fund model are entities owned by media groups, which provide start-ups with their own owned media. Some examples are the Stroeer company, which specializes in billboards and street furniture, the German television group ProSiebenSat.1, the Spanish and Italian's Mediaset through the appointed vehicle Ad4Ventures, Channel 4 and ITV's respective media growth vehicles - Channel4Ventures and AdVentures.

The other fund model, independent media for equity funds, are not owned by media groups, but have partnership arrangements with a set of media companies, often covering different media types. Due to the number of partners and media types, this approach is more challenging to set up and manage, but can provide start-ups with a greater range of media options.

The distinction exists in conventional venture capital as well, where corporate VCs are contrasted to partner-owned VC funds. Founded in 2002, Aggregate Media in Sweden is an early pioneer of this media for equity model.

Media for equity funding can be found in many areas around the world, for example in India through the Times Group’s fund Brand Capital International. Since 2005 the fund has invested $4 billion + worth of media in over 900 companies across a wide range of sectors including ed-tech, fintech, health-tech, retail, FMCG, consumer durables, among others.

According to mediaforgrowth, there are over 30 active media for equity funds globally. In 2022 a record $152 M+ was raised in Global Media Funding and the 2nd largest no of deals closed on record (after 2021).
