= Magic Bullet (appliance) =

Compact household blender

The Magic Bullet
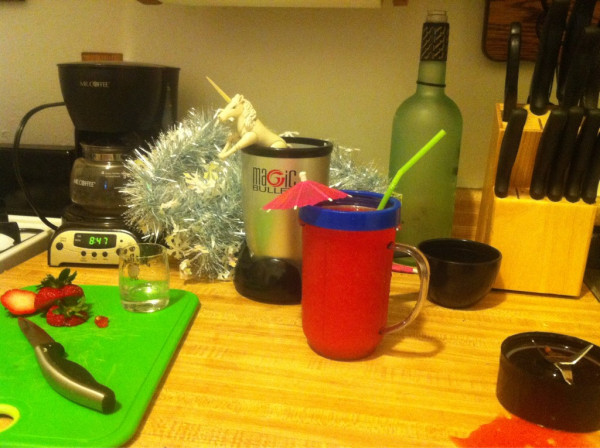
- Magic Bullet blender
- Type: Blender
- Manufacturer: Homeland Housewares

The Magic Bullet is a compact blender sold by Homeland Housewares, a division of the American company Alchemy Worldwide, and sold in over 50 countries. It is widely marketed through television advertisements and infomercials and sold in retail stores under the "As seen on TV" banner. A feature-limited retail version not under this banner called the "Magic Bullet Single Shot+" is also available.

Since the introduction of the Magic Bullet in 2003, other incarnations include the Magic Bullet To Go, the Magic Bullet Mini, the Bullet Express, the Baby Bullet, the NutriBullet, the Party Bullet and the Dessert Bullet.

== Product ==
The Magic Bullet is a personal blender that is designed to be used as a space saving replacement for other appliances such as a blender, food processor, and electric juicer. The name is derived from the ogive-shaped curve of the blending cups. The blender cup is dishwasher safe, and its cylindrical shape makes hand-washing easy. The entire Magic Bullet system consists of an electric blender base with a number of attachments. Attachments included with the product include:

- one of two available screw-on blade attachments; the "cross blade" (used for chopping foods and crushing ice),
- two mixing cups, one short and one tall,
- two handled cups, called by the manufacturer "Party Mugs", which can be used to blend individual drinks (also with colored "Comfort Rings" that screw over the threads),
- lids for the cups, intended for storing foods, and
- an instruction manual which also contains a recipe book (Magic Bullet 10 Second Recipes and Owner Manual), featuring recipes prepared in the infomercial and others.

Other add-ons can be purchased separately:

- perforated lids for the cups that are used to ventilate items cooked in the cup when using a microwave oven, and to dispense hard foods that have been ground using the appliance,
- the other of two available screw-on blade attachments: a "flat blade" (used for chopping harder foods, as well as for whipping),
- other attachments include a full size blender pitcher and a manual juice extractor attachment.

== Lawsuit and explosion allegations ==
In May 2018, Fox affiliate KTTV in Los Angeles obtained test videos from NutriBullet which appeared to show the machine exploding in different situations, and some consumers told FOX11 they were injured by using the blender. Fourteen people have sued the company saying they were cut or burned when their NutriBullet exploded. The company has denied responsibility for the consumers' injuries.

== Usage ==
The appliance is used by attaching a blade attachment to the desired cup and fitting the assembly upside down on top of the base. The base contains the motor that turns the blade, which is inside the cup. When one applies pressure to the top of the unit, the blade spins. If one turns the cup to lock into the base, it will continue to spin until it is disengaged.

== Infomercial ==
The Magic Bullet is known for its 30-minute infomercial, broadcast mostly in the early hours of the morning. The original Magic Bullet infomercial, first broadcast in the early 2000s, featured an unconventional format compared to typical direct-response advertisements. Rather than employing a traditional studio setting or a formal pitch, the segment is set in a kitchen during what appears to be a morning-after gathering, where two hosts, "Mick" and "Mimi", demonstrate the appliance to a group of casual houseguests. Each guest represents a distinct personality type and reacts to the demonstrations, providing opportunities for the hosts to showcase various uses of the product. The infomercial includes quick preparation of recipes such as smoothies, omelets, and dips, emphasizing the device's speed and versatility with the repeated claim that it can perform tasks "in 10 seconds or less".

== History ==
The Magic Bullet was introduced in October 2003 by Homeland Housewares, a division of Alchemy Worldwide LLC. The product was developed by a team that included Lenny Sands, Brady Caverly, and Jeff Clifford, who had previously worked in the infomercial industry. The company grew to over $200 million in annual sales, with the Magic Bullet accounting for $250 million in revenue during its first 17 months on the market.

The design for the Magic Bullet was registered with the United States Patent and Trademark Office by Lenny Sands, who is listed as the inventor.

In 2015, Magic Bullet introduced an app that offers breakfast, lunch and dinner recipes to Magic Bullet users.

In October 2017, the Bluetooth-enabled NutriBullet Balance was released. The blender works with a companion app which allows users to track calories from ingredients processed using the machine.

== Patent infringement ==
The Magic Bullet has been replicated and imitated on more than one occasion. Homeland Housewares, LLC, is a member of eBay's Verified Rights Owner (VeRO) program and has created a Consumer Counterfeit Watch web page in order to help educate consumers regarding these issues.
