= Radio Advertising Bureau (US) =

The Radio Advertising Bureau (or RAB) is a membership organization for radio stations and others in the US radio industry dating back to 1950. Its original purpose was to highlight radio's importance in the wake of the rapid rise of television in the 1950s. In the mid-1960s, RAB partnered with the Clio Awards and created a category for best radio advertising each year.

The Radio Advertising Bureau serves more than 6,000 member Radio stations in the U.S. and over 1,000 member networks, representative firms, broadcast vendors, and international organizations. RAB leads and participates in educational, research, sales, and advocacy programs that promote and advance Radio as a primary advertising medium.
