= ATL & BTL Agencies =

Two styles of marketing agencies

ATL & BTL Agencies refer to two different categories of marketing agencies, especially in promotion marketing and communication.

"ATL" stands for Above The Line, meaning that the advertising is going to be deployed around a wider target audience, e.g. television (TVC), radio, or billboards. applicable when a product is directed for a broader spectrum of consumers, for example a soft drink company might contract an ATL advertising agency to develop ads targeting a broad audience.

"BTL", or Below The Line, suggests that the advertising is going to target a specific group of potential consumers. BTL advertising agencies will be hired to help companies to develop ads and promotion strategies in a creative way, directed to certain groups of, using tools like direct emailing, targeted social media, or direct product demonstrations for a specific group of people, like giving away vitamin samples at the door of a famous gym.

"TTL" stands for: "Through the Line" marketing, which combines the above two methods. It involves using both ATL and BTL marketing strategies to create an integrated campaign across a number of channels.

== History ==
The term above the line and below the line were originally found in Procter & Gamble’s budgeting manual. In 1954, the consumer goods company separated its marketing spend according to the way it paid its bills. Agencies that took a commission from the media were above, while promotions and other activities that had no commission to pay were kept below.
