= Market overhang =

Market overhang is a term derived from the physical world meaning things that stick out or hang over another thing. Often from the viewpoint of standing beneath an 'overhang' there is shade provided by a protrusion from the adjacent vertical domain, such as a tree or building.

In marketing, overhanging the market relates to the business practice of announcing a new product or a new business strategy by a company in an adjacent space to the target. To be an overhang in this context, the following conditions must exist: the announcer is a market leader in the adjacent space; the new product is not ready for release at the time of the announcement; the market is new and standards are not yet clearly defined; and, the goal is to forestall competitor growth by encouraging customers to wait for the new product.

== Recent examples of overhang ==
In June 1999 - Nortel declared a voice over IP strategy, while Cisco and its newly acquired Selcius Systems IP PBX were starting to gain traction. Nortel was a leader in enterprise PBXs and made this announcement to retain the loyalty of their enormous installed base and to slow down the adoption of the IP PBX product category. Nortel overhung the IP PBX market, announcing products 12 months or more before their availability.

In June 2006 - Microsoft entered the IP Telephony market with Office Communicator. Here the collection of products and related applications in adjacent markets combined with announcements of as-yet-not-available products, attempt to overhang the IP PBX market, slowing down the growth of the market, forcing the players to consider the implications and adjust, encouraging customers to think about what Microsoft can bring to the market, giving Microsoft engineering the time to catch up with product.

== Effectiveness of Market Overhang ==
The empirical evidence suggests this technique is effective since it continues to be used as a marketing tactic by major players that are slower to respond to the high growth of adjacent markets that are rapidly emerging. As the high technology industry continues to consolidate, market overhang is likely to continue as a mechanism for marketers to 'shape' emerging segments.
