= Annalaura di Luggo =

Italian multimedia artist

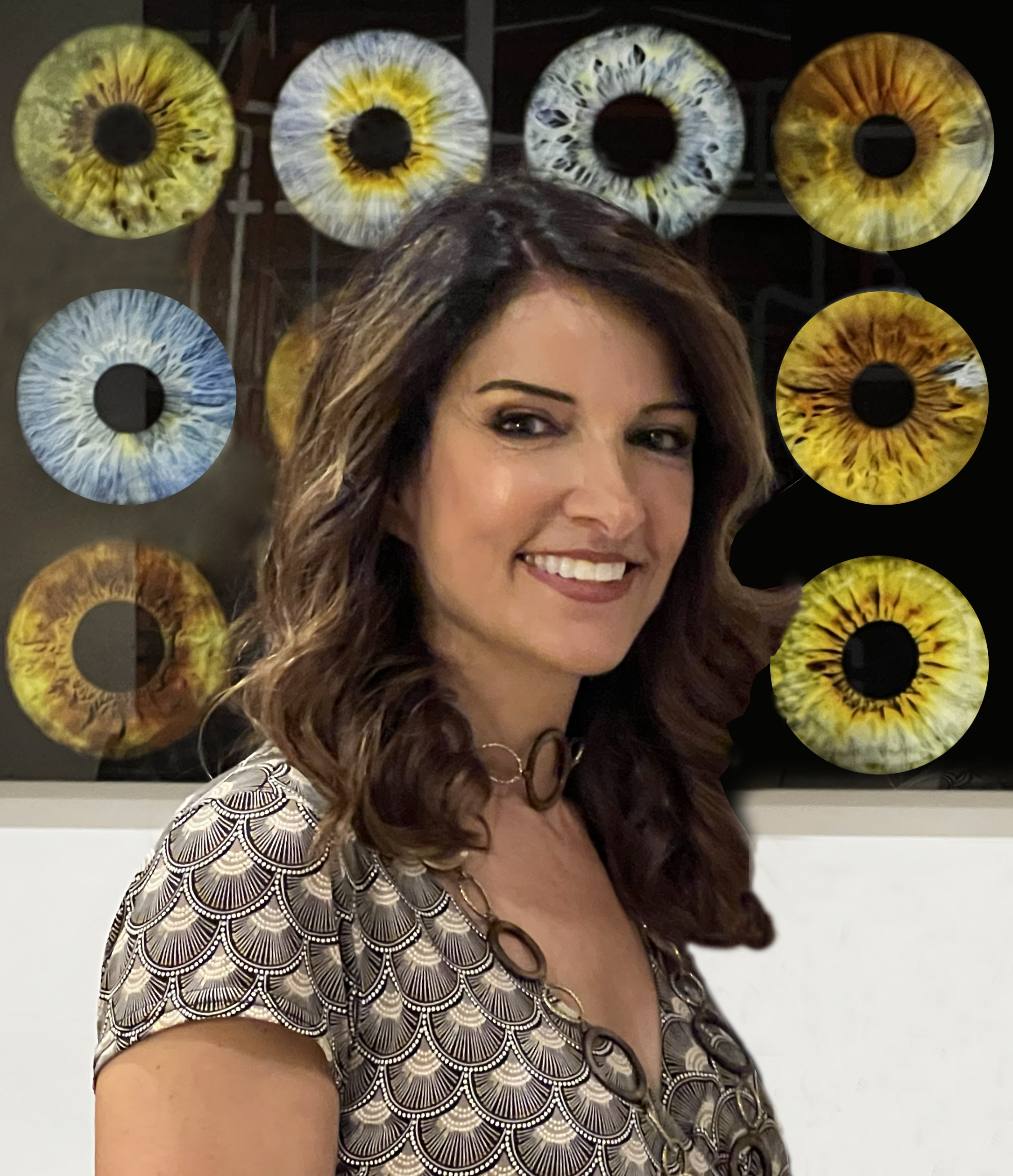
- Born: Naples, Italy
- Occupations: Artist, film director, filmmaker
- Known for: Multimedia, photography, film directing, performance, sculpture.
- Works: Oculus-Spei, Còlloculi > We Are Art, Intro-Spectio
- Movement: Relational art
- Website: https://www.annalauradiluggo.com

Annalaura di Luggo is an Italian multimedia artist, film director, and filmmaker. Her art usually centers around the symbolism of the eye and vision to explore identity, diversty, and human connection.

== Early life and education ==
Annalaura di Luggo was born on 1970 at Naples, Italy. Originally trained in painting, she expanded her artistic practice to include photography and new media, developing a visual language that integrates technology with social commentary.

== Career ==
di Luggo's works have been presented at the Robert F. Kennedy Foundation, the Juvenile Penitentiary of Nisida, the United Nations Headquarters in 2018, and Pantheon, Rome in 2024. Her work has been the subject of essays by critics including Demetrio Paparoni, Giulia Gueci, and Antonello Tolve. On the 58th Venice Biennale, di Luggo exhibited Genesis and Narratur.

Monographs and exhibition catalogues on di Luggo's works have been published by Artium Publishing, Silvana Editoriale, JUS Museum Edizioni, Sala Editori, and Artem.

== Intro-Spectio ==
Intro-Spectio is a cycle of artworks by Annalaura di Luggo dedicated to exploring the relationship between vision and interiority through both static and dynamic formats. The works use photographs, plexiglass, aluminum, and video to create multilayered compositions that unfold across shifting visual planes. Intro-Spectio is centered on the recurring motif of the iris, often placed in correspondence with the heart area.

Intro-Spectio has been presented in venues such as the Museo Nazionale Romano – Terme di Diocleziano in Rome, the Complesso Monumentale dello Steri – Palazzo Chiaramonte in Palermo, and the PAN – Palazzo delle Arti Napoli.

== Oculus-Spei ==
In 2022, de Luggo created Oculus-Spei, curated by Ivan D'Alberto. Oculus-Spei is an interactive multimedia installation commissioned by the Pantheon for the 2025 Jubilee, inspired by the symbolism of holy doors traditionally opened during the Jubilee year. Oculus-Spei first presented inside Pantheon, Rome from December 2024 to March 2025 and was experienced by more than two million visitors, including the Italian Ministries of Culture, Foreign Affairs, and Justice.

Oculus-Spei takes the form of five virtual doors. The first four engage people with disabilities from different parts of the world, who become protagonists of a luminous and participatory dialogue. The fifth door employs gesture-recognition cameras to project the visitor's own image behind virtual bars, broken by a beam of light.

di Luggo also directed a short film with the same name, which qualified "for consideration" for the 2026 Academy Awards in the "Best Documentary Short" category.

Oculus-Spei was exhibited at:

- Pantheon, Rome, from December 2024 to March 2025
- Rotonda Brunelleschi at the Museo de’ Medici in Florence, in April 2025
- Chapel of the Holy Shroud of Turin's Royal Museums, from June 2025 to October 2025
- Museo del Tesoro di San Gennaro in Naples, from November 2025 to February 2026, promoted by Neapolis 2500 and the Italian Ministry of Foreign Affairs

Oculus-Spei also won the 52nd Sulmona Prize from October 2025 to November 2025.

== Còlloculi > We Are Art ==
In 2022, di Luggo created Còlloculi > We Are Art, curated by Gabriele Perretta with critic texts by Demetrio Paparoni and Antonello Tolve. Còlloculi is a multimedia interactive art installation constructed in the shape of a giant eye made of recycled aluminum, and the multimedia installation We Are Art is projected through its pupil.

We Are Art uses video and sound design to show the eyes of how four young adults overcame adversities such as bullying, racial discrimination, blindness, alcohol, and crime. Using virtual reality, the viewer can interact and become part of the installation.

The creative process of Còlloculi > We Are Art is narrated in the documentary We Are Art Through the Eyes of Annalaura, directed by the same artist.

Còlloculi > We Are Art has been exhibited at:

- Naples Banco di Napoli Foundation, previewed in 2022
- National Archaeological Museum in Naples, 2022-2023
- Chieti Palazzo De’ Mayo Museum, 2024
- Baths of Diocletian at Museo Nazionale Romano, 2024-2025
- Pompeii Archaeological Park, 2024–2025

== Blind Vision ==
In 2017, di Luggo created Blind Vision, curated by Raisa Clavijo. Blind Vision arises from di Luggo's interest in exploring the universe of people who perceive the world with senses other than sight, and depicts the eyes of a group of 20 totally or partially blind people. Blind Vision was reviewed by Paul Laster, Paco Barragan, and Timothy Hadfield. The multimedia installation was permanently displayed at the Museum of the P. Colosimo Institute. Blind Vision has exhibited at:

- Basel Art Fair,
- New York Italian Consulate,
- New York - United Nations,
- Cortina d’Ampezzo, Italy
- Colosimo Museum, Naples,
- Piazza dei Martiri, Naples

== Napoli Eden ==
Napoli Eden is a set of four site-specific monumental installations open to the public held across four squares (Triumphus - Piazza Municipio, Pyramid Galleria Umberto I, Geminus Largo Baracche, Harmonia Largo Santa Caterina), in the city of Naples, Italy. This project inspired the creation of the feature docu-film “Napoli Eden”, based on a concept by di Luggo, directed by Bruno Colella with music by Eugenio Bennato, cinematography by Blasco Giurato, creative consultancy by Stanley Isaacs. It was inspired by the true story of the artist when she decided to install her artworks and to involve some troubled young people from the Spanish Quarters of Naples in the construction of Pyramid, a metallic tree of 10 meters, made by aluminum scraps to stimulate new life prospects and "a journey towards the light."

Napoli Eden premiered in Rome at the Arena Adriano studios and was qualified as “Film d’essai”. The film won various awards at international festivals, including: Impact DOCS Awards California; Hollywood Gold Awards 2020; L’Age d’Or International Arthouse Film Festival 2020; Venice Film Awards 2020 and a special mention of the critical jury at Social World Film Festival 2020.

Napoli Eden passed the admission selection to the 93rd Academy Awards and qualified for consideration for documentary feature.

Napoli Eden Exhibitions

- Naples 2018-2019
- Milan Citylife Ad Lumen 2020

Permanent expositions

- Milan via Manzoni, 38 Geminus
- Naples via Brin, 63 Harmonia

== Selected exhibitions ==
=== Solo exhibitions ===
- 2015 – Occh-IO, Specchio dell’anima, Fondazione Le Stelline, Milan.
- 2015 – Occh-IO / Eye-I, The Format Contemporary Culture Gallery, Milan. Curated by Guido Cabib.
- 2016 – Occh-IO / Eye-I, White Dot Gallery, Miami. Curated by Giada Baselice.
- 2016 – Occh-IO / Eye-I, Sporting Monte-Carlo, Monaco. Curated by Guido Cabib.
- 2016 – Sea Vision, seven installations, Genoa International Boat Show, Genoa. Curated by Luigi Caramiello.
- 2016 – Never Give Up, European Center for the Study of Deviance and Juvenile Crime, Juvenile Penitentiary Institute, Nisida (Naples). Curated by Guido Cabib.
- 2016 – An Triebe im Wandel (with Falk Kastel), 28 Heidelberger Symposium, Neue Universität, Heidelberg.
- 2017 – Blind Vision, Istituto Paolo Colosimo, Naples. Curated by Raisa Clavijo. (Catalogue: Artium Publishing; texts by Raisa Clavijo, Luigi Caramiello, Stephen Knudsen, Andrea Viliani et al.)
- 2017 – Human Rights Vision, Palazzo Vecchio, Florence. Curated by Fabrizio Moretti.
- 2018 – Blind Vision, United Nations Headquarters, New York (11th World Conference on the Rights of Persons with Disabilities). Curated by Raisa Clavijo.
- 2019 – Napoli Eden, dispersed site-specific installations across Naples. Curated by Francesco Gallo Mazzeo.
- 2019 – Annalaura di Luggo, Consolato Generale d’Italia, New York.
- 2021 – Iride, Ex Museo Paleontologico, within the exhibition +Divenire (LVII Agosto Corcianese), Corciano (PG). Curated by Gabriele Perretta.
- 2019 – Traiettorie d’incanto. Per Farinelli, Palazzo Nunziante, Naples. Curated by Marcello Palminteri.
- 2020 – Ad Lumen (from Napoli Eden), three installations for Natale degli Alberi, CityLife Shopping District, Milan.
- 2022 – Innesti (with Lucia Gangheri), Millenium Gallery, Bologna. Curated by Rita Alessandra Fusco and Marcello Palminteri.
- 2022 – Collòculi > We Are Art (preview), Fondazione Banco Napoli, Naples. Curated by Gabriele Perretta.
- 2022 – Collòculi > We Are Art, MANN – Museo Archeologico Nazionale di Napoli. Curated by Gabriele Perretta. (Catalogue: JUS Museum Edizioni; texts by Gabriele Perretta, Marcello Palminteri et al.)
- 2023 – Intro-Spectio, Global Fine Art, New York.
- 2023 – Multum Animo Vidit, PAN – Palazzo delle Arti Napoli. Curated by Filomena Maria Sardella. (Catalogue: JUS Museum Edizioni; texts by Filomena Maria Sardella and Aldo Gerbino.)
- 2023 – Oscurità e Sommersione, Complesso Monumentale dello Steri, Palazzo Chiaramonte, Palermo. Curated by Aldo Gerbino. (Catalogue: JUS Museum Edizioni & Accademia di Scienze Mediche “F. Ingrassia”; texts by Aldo Gerbino et al.)
- 2024 – Collòculi, Fondazione Banco Napoli, Palazzo de’ Mayo, Chieti.
- 2024 – Collòculi / Intro-Spectio, National Roman Museum, Baths of Diocletian, Rome. Curated by Gabriele Perretta. (Catalogue: Silvana Editoriale; texts by Gabriele Perretta, Demetrio Paparoni, Marcello Palminteri et al.)
- 2024-2025 – Collòculi@Pompei, Pompeii Archaeological Park, Forum Baths, Pompeii. Curated by Antonello Tolve. (Catalogue: Artem; texts by Antonello Tolve, Gabriele Perretta et al.)
- 2024-2025 – Oculus-Spei, Pantheon, Rome. Curated by Ivan D’Alberto. (Catalogue: Sala Editori; texts by Ivan D’Alberto, Gabriella Musto et al.)
- 2025 – Oculus-Spei, Medici Museum, Florence. Curated by Ivan D’Alberto.
- 2025 – Oculus-Spei, Chapel of the Holy Shroud, Royal Museums, Turin. Curated by Ivan D’Alberto. (Catalogue: Artem; texts by Ivan D’Alberto, Don Alessio Geretti et al.)
- 2025-2026 – Oculus-Spei, Museum of the Treasury of San Gennaro, Naples Cathedral. Curated by Ivan D’Alberto. (Catalogue: Jus Museum; texts by Ivan D’Alberto, Mons Vincenzo Dr Gregorio et al.)

=== Group exhibitions ===
- 2016 – Questa casa non è un albergo, Officine Miramare, Reggio Calabria. Curated by Giuseppe Capparelli.
- 2019 – Genesis, 58th Venice Biennale, Dominican Republic Pavilion, Palazzo Albrizzi-Capello, Venice.
- 2020 – AlphaBeta, JUS Museum, Naples. Curated by Francesco Gallo Mazzeo.
- 2020 – AlphaBeta, Alessandro Vitiello Home Gallery, Rome. Curated by Francesco Gallo Mazzeo.
- 2020 – AlphaBeta, Spoleto Arte Incontro Art Gallery, Spoleto (PG). Curated by Francesco Gallo Mazzeo.
- 2020 – Medialismi 2.0, various locations, Corciano (PG). Curated by Gabriele Perretta.
- 2022 – In-pressionem, JUS Museum | Galleria d’Arte, Naples.
- 2023 – Incarta/Incanta, JUS Museum | Galleria d’Arte, Naples.
- 2023 – The Flow of the Future, Nhow, Milan. Curated by Alessia Bennani.
- 2025 – 52° Premio Sulmona, Sulmona (AQ). Curated by Ivan D’Alberto.
- 2025 – Per via del tutto eccezionale #2, Fondazione Bianca e Filiberto Menna, Rome. Curated by Antonello Tolve.

== Filmography ==
Oculus-Spei (2025) is a 20-minute documentary written and directed by Annalaura di Luggo. The documentary qualified "for consideration" for the 2026 Academy Awards in the "Best Documentary Short" category and silver for the Hollywood Gold Awards. Oculus-Spei was also nominated for the Impact DOCS Awards, International Art Film Festival (IFF Art Film), and the Miami Beach Film Festival.

We Are Art Through the Eyes of Annalaura (2023) is a 69-minute documentary written and directed by Annalaura di Luggo. The documentary was qualified "or consideration in the categories "Best Documentary Feature" and "Best Original Song" for the 2022 Academy Awards and was listed as a Film d’essai. We Are Art Through the Eyes of Annalaura was nominated for the 2022 Hollywood Music in Media Awards and the 2025 Visioni dal Mondo.

Blind Vision (2022) is a 23-minute documentary directed by Annalaura di Luggo and Nanni Zedda. Blind Vision won the "Best Documentary Award" at the 2018 Niagara Falls International Film Festival and the 2019 Fort Myers International Film Festival.

Napoli Eden (2021) is a 74-minute documentary film directed by Bruno Colella and written by Annalaura di Luggo. The documentary was qualified for consideration for the "Best Documentary Feature" category in the 2021 Academy Awards, listed as a Film d’essai, and was selected by the Italian Ministry of Foreign Affairs (MAECI) for international cultural promotion. Napoli Eden won the "Best Documentary Award" in the 2020 Impact DOCS Awards, 2020 Hollywood Gold Awards, 2020 Venice Film Awards, 2020 Social World Film Festival (additionally receiving a special jury mention), and the 2021 Cinema Verde Environment Films & Arts Festival. The documentary was nominated for the 2020 On Art Film Festival, the 2020 New Fest-True Stories, the 2020 The Scene Festival, and the 2020 International Art Festival.

Narratur (2019) is a short film written and directed by Annalaura di Luggo. It was presented at the 58th Venice Biennale (Dominican Republic Pavilion.

Never Give Up (2016) is a short film written and directed by Annalaura di Luggo

== Bibliography ==
- Annalaura di Luggo, Oculus-Spei. Exhibition catalogue for the Museum of the Treasury of San Gennaro, Naples Cathedral. Curated by Ivan D’Alberto. Jus Museum, Naples, 2025.
- Annalaura di Luggo, Oculus-Spei. Exhibition catalogue for the Chapel of the Holy Shroud, Royal Museums, Turin. Curated by Ivan D’Alberto. Artem, Naples, 2025. ISBN 978-88-569-1031-5.
- Annalaura di Luggo, Oculus-Spei. Exhibition catalogue for the Pantheon, Rome. Curated by Ivan D’Alberto. Sala Editori, Pescara, 2024. ISBN 978-88-32196-41-2.
- Annalaura di Luggo, Collòculi @Pompei. Exhibition catalogue for the Pompeii Archaeological Park. Curated by Antonello Tolve. Texts by Antonello Tolve and Gabriele Perretta. Artem, Naples, 2024. ISBN 978-88-569-1016-2.
- Annalaura di Luggo, Collòculi | Intro-Spectio. Exhibition catalogue for the National Roman Museum, Baths of Diocletian, Rome. Curated by Gabriele Perretta. Texts by Gabriele Perretta and Demetrio Paparoni. Silvana Editoriale, 2024. ISBN 978-88-366-5927-2.
- Annalaura di Luggo, Intro-Spectio. Exhibition catalogue for the Complesso Monumentale dello Steri, Palazzo Chiaramonte, Palermo. Curated by Aldo Gerbino. JUS Museum Edizioni & Accademia di Scienze Mediche di Palermo G.F. Ingrassia, 2023. ISBN 978-89-4457087-7-0.
- Annalaura di Luggo, Multum Animo Vidit. Exhibition catalogue for PAN – Palazzo delle Arti di Napoli. Curated by Filomena Maria Sardella. Texts by Aldo Gerbino and Filomena Maria Sardella. JUS Museum Edizioni, 2023.
- Annalaura di Luggo, Collòculi > We Are Art. Exhibition catalogue for the MANN – Museo Archeologico Nazionale di Napoli. Curated by Gabriele Perretta. Texts by Paolo Giulierini, Ludovico Solima, Marcello Palminteri, Stanley Isaacs, and Greg Ferris. JUS Museum Edizioni, 2022. ISBN 978-88-944587-2-5.
- Annalaura di Luggo, Blind Vision. Curated by Raisa Clavijo. Texts by Raisa Clavijo, Luigi Caramiello, Stephen Knudsen, Paul Laster, and Andrea Viliani. Artium Publishing, Miami. ISBN 978-0-9960288-2-0.
- Annalaura di Luggo, Genesis. Catalogue for the Pavilion of the Dominican Republic, 58th Venice Biennale. JUS Museum Edizioni, 2019. ISBN 978-88-944587-1-8.
