= Antonello Silverini =

Italian illustrator (born 1966)

- Born: Antonello Silverini; 21 August 1966 (age 60) Rome, Italy
- Collaborators: The Economist; The Washington Post; Armando Testa; Corriere della Sera; Dentsu; Einaudi; Fairwood Press; Fanucci; Il Sole 24 Ore; J. Walter Thompson; l'Espresso; la Repubblica; Lehigh University; manifestolibri; McCann-Erickson; Mondadori; Ogilvy & Mather; Panorama; Publicis; Saatchi & Saatchi; Stanford University; TBWA; The Boston Globe; Vanderbilt University; Young & Rubicam

Antonello Silverini (born 21 August 1966, in Rome) is an Italian illustrator. He received the MAM (Master of Art and Craft) prize in 2016.

== Career ==
Antonello Silverini has worked with Italian and international agencies. In 2002 Silverini's illustrations were selected for the American Showcase (25th Annual), a curated annual collection recognizing international illustrators.

In 2007 his work was included in Lürzer's Archive Special – 200 Best Illustrators Worldwide. Antonello's illustrations have been published in major Italian newspapers, including Il Sole 24 Ore and La Repubblica.

In 2012 Silverini designed the official artwork for the Rome Film Festival’s promotional campaign, including visuals incorporated into an animated video used in advertising for the festival. Silverini further illustrated covers for Nobel laureate Doris Lessing; and in 2013 was commissioned by Fanucci Editore to produce cover art for the publisher’s 25th anniversary editions of Philip K. Dick’s novels. Also in 2013, he created the promotional poster for Ophelia, a short film by Annarita Zambrano, which was presented at the 66th Cannes Film Festival.

In 2015 the Einaudi publishing house selected Silverini, along with Noma Bar and Shout, for the graphic re-styling of the Super ET book collection. Silverini also designed the Italian book covers of Ian McEwan's novels. He designed the poster for Ascanio Celestini's 2015 film Lunga vita alla sposa, presented at the Venice International Film Festival.

In 2016, Silverini was featured in Le eccellenze creative del fumetto e dell'illustrazione di Roma e Lazio, a catalog of cartoonists and illustrators. The volume was presented at the Festival International de la bande dessinée d'Angoulême, one of Europe’s significant comics festivals.

In 2017, Carmelo Occhipinti included Silverini's work in the volume Antonello Silverini. Quello che si vede, part of the Monographs series of Horti Hesperidum, published under the patronage of the Department of Literary, Philosophical and Art History of the University of Rome Tor Vergata.

Silverini is a faculty member in graphic art and illustration at the University of Rome ‘Tor Vergata’ and at the Accademia di Belle Arti di Roma, where he teaches courses in illustration and visual communication. Silverini has contributed illustrations to La Lettura, the Sunday supplement of the Corriere della Sera, since its relaunch.

== Awards and prizes ==
- American Showcase 25 (2002)
- "Teatrio" Chioggia – ITA (2004)
- Accademia Pictor di Torino – ITA (2005)
- Premio Zavrel – ITA (2006)
- "Bollicine d'Artista" – ITA (2006)
- "Teatrio" Chioggia – ITA (2006)
- Lürzer's Archive Special the 200 Best Illustrators Worldwide (2007)
- Selected—Master Cup International Cartoon and Illustration Biennial – China (2011)
- Selected—Kyoto International Cartoon Exhibition – JAPAN (2012)
- MAM (Maestro d’Arte e Mestiere) – Fondazione Cologni (2016)

== Exhibitions ==
- 2007 Venice — Venice Design Art Gallery
- 2008 Padoa — Illustrabilia '08
- 2008 Rome — 25 anniversario Philip Dick (Libreria Fanucci)
- 2009 Rome — Galleria 105 Art
- 2014 Rome — Fuori dal Quotidiano (Rosso20sette Arte Contemporanea)
- 2014 Cremona — Aiuto mi sono perso (Tapirulan)
- 2015 Florence — Ruvidezze (Catravetra)
- 2016 Cremona — 33T (Tapirulan)
- 2016 Monza — Quello che si vede (Villa Reale)
- 2017 Milano — Il Colore delle Parole - La Triennale
- 2019 - Nello spazio e nel tempo - Palazzo del Monte di Pietà - Forl
- 2020 - "RODARIANA" La Fantasia non è un lupo cattivo - Morano Calabro/ Castrovillari
