= We Are Art Through the Eyes of Annalaura =

- Directed by: Annalaura di Luggo
- Produced by: Annalaura di Luggo
- Cinematography: Emilio Costa
- Edited by: Christopher Roth
- Music by: Pasquale (Paky) Di Maio
- Production company: Annydi Productions
- Release date: 16 September 2022
- Running time: 69 minutes
- Country: Italy

We Are Art Through the Eyes of Annalaura is a 2022 documentary feature film produced and directed by Annalaura di Luggo in collaboration with production supervisor and creative consultant Stanley Isaacs. The Cinematographer was Emilio Costa, the Editor was Christopher Roth, the Sound Designer/Composer was Pasquale (Paky) Di Maio and the marketing consultant was Greg Ferris.

The cast includes Annalaura di Luggo, Giuseppe “Pino” Amabile, Larissa De Maio, Noemi Marano, Youssouf Kone, Stanley Isaacs, Gabriele Perretta.

The feature-length documentary, We Are Art Through the Eyes of Annalaura, is the only Italian documentary feature that qualified for consideration for the 2023 Academy Awards (Oscars) in the Best Documentary Feature and Best Original Song Categories.

The original song We Are Art, written by Annalaura di Luggo and Paky Di Maio, was also nominated for Best Song in a Documentary at the Hollywood Music in Media Awards HMMA.

The film will be distributed worldwide, except Italy, in 2023 by Cinedigm Entertainment.

== Synopsis ==
Filmed on location in Naples, Italy, We Are Art Through the Eyes of Annalaura is an inspirational story of creativity, second chances and new beginnings. The casting process was conducted with the aim of giving the audience a taste of the local Naples community.

The documentary follows Annalaura's greatest artistic challenge: the creation of Collòculi, an immersive, multi-media and interactive art installation.

Her journey through Collòculi represents her most artistic challenge and it is built in the shape of a Giant Eye made of recycled aluminium, a symbol of environmental regeneration and recycling.

The documentary begins with the interviews of dozens of young adults who reveal their personal adversities in life such as bullying, racial discrimination, blindness, alcohol and drug abuse, sexual discrimination and crime. After the interviews, Annalaura incorporates her artistic vision of the lives of four of these young people who, in their individual ways, have found a spiritual path out of darkness into the light, recovering their self-esteem and finding a new value in life.

Through her expressive interpretations, the intimate revelations of the young people were transformed, blending their stories with the language of photography, digital video art, sound design, sensory interaction and experimental cinema.

Once completed, the narrative was embodied in the Giant Eye and projected through the pupil, thus enabling the gallery viewer, through virtual technology, to engage and be part of the installation.

The film obtained the support of the Italian Ministry of Culture (MiC), of the Campania Region Film Commission, of the Banco di Napoli Foundation and of Luca de Magistris Private Banker Fideuram.
