= History of advertising =

Major force in capitalist economies

Advertising revenue as a percent of US GDP shows a rise in audio-visual and digital advertising at the expense of print media.

The history of advertising can be traced to ancient civilizations. It became a major force in capitalist economies in the mid-19th century, based primarily on newspapers and magazines. In the 20th century, advertising grew rapidly with new technologies such as direct mail, radio, television, the internet, and mobile devices.

Between 1919 and 2007 advertising averaged 2.2 percent of Gross Domestic Product in the United States.

== Pre-modern history ==
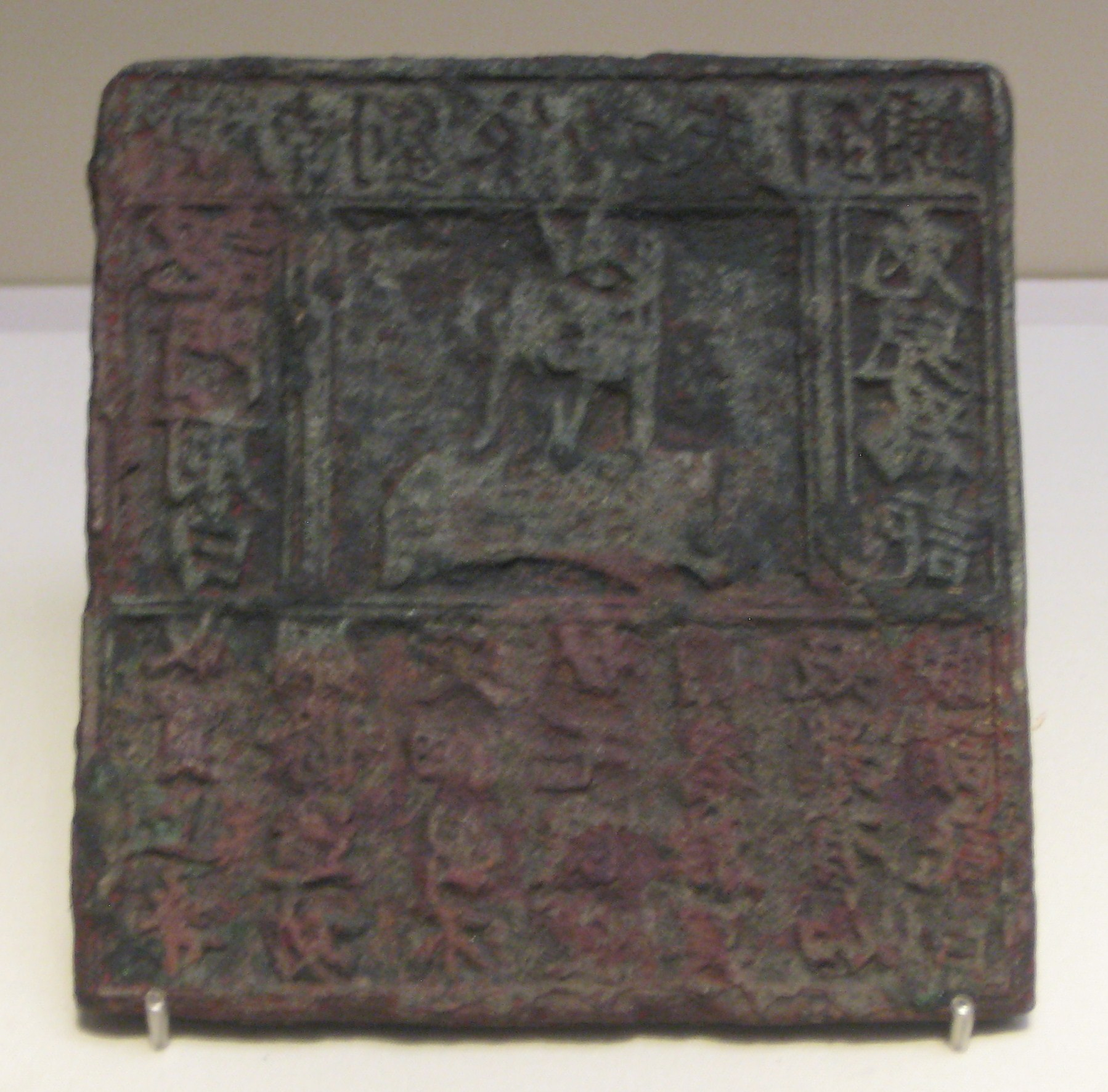
Bronze plate for printing an advertisement for the Liu family needle shop at Jinan, Song dynasty China. It is considered the world's earliest identified printed advertising medium.

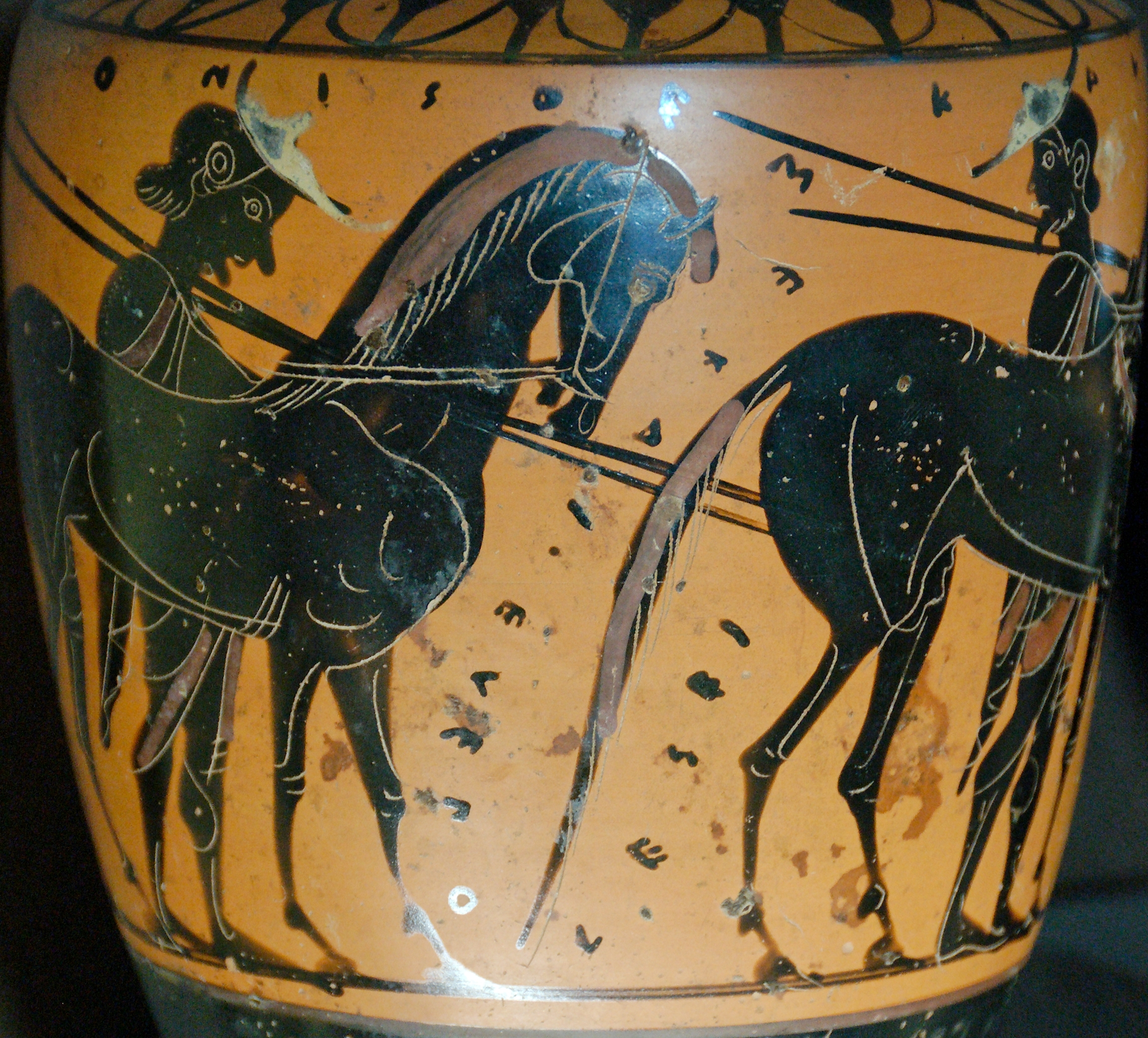
Advertising from Ancient Greece

Egyptians used papyrus to make sales messages and wall posters. Commercial messages and political campaign displays have been found in the ruins of Pompeii and Arabia. Lost and found advertising on papyrus was common in Ancient Greece and Ancient Rome. Wall or rock painting for commercial advertising is another manifestation of an ancient advertising form, which is present to this day in many parts of Asia, Africa, and South America. The tradition of wall painting can be traced back to Indian rock art paintings that date back to 4000 BCE.

In ancient China, the earliest advertising known was oral, as recorded in the Classic of Poetry (11th to 7th centuries BCE) of bamboo flutes played to sell candy. Advertisement usually took the form of calligraphic signboards and inked papers. A copper printing plate dating back to the Song dynasty used to print posters in the form of a square sheet of paper with a rabbit logo with "Jinan Liu's Fine Needle Shop" and "We buy high quality steel rods and make fine quality needles, to be ready for use at home in no time" written above and below. It is considered the world's earliest identified printed advertising medium.

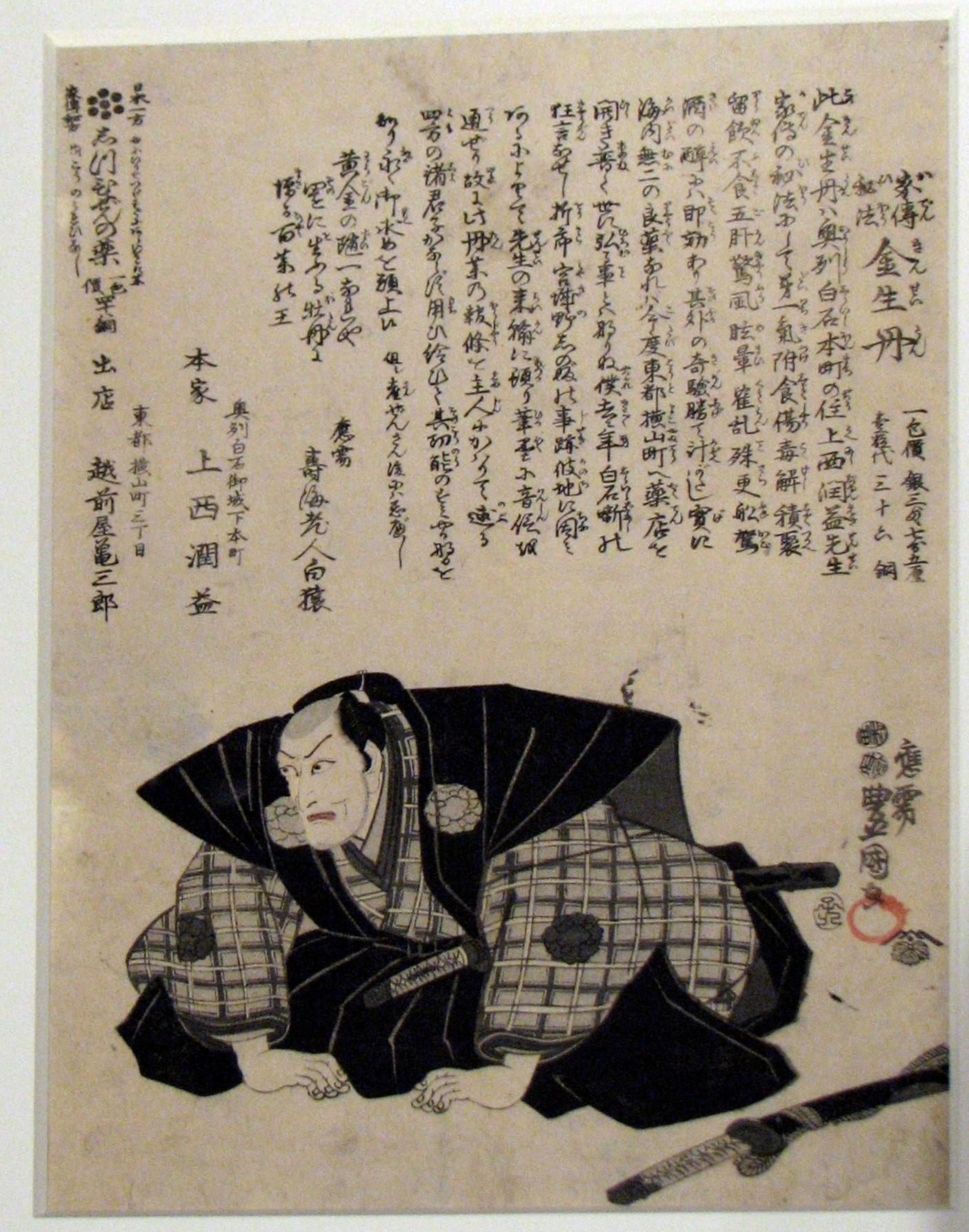
Edo period LEL flyer from 1806 for a traditional medicine called Kinseitan

In Europe, as the towns and cities of the Middle Ages began to grow, and the general populace was unable to read, instead of signs that read "cobbler", "miller", "tailor", or "blacksmith" would use an image associated with their trade such as a boot, a suit, a hat, a clock, a diamond, a horseshoe, a candle or even a bag of flour. Fruits and vegetables were sold in the city square from the backs of carts and wagons and their proprietors used street callers (town criers) to announce their whereabouts for the convenience of the customers. The first compilation of such advertisements was gathered in Les Crieries de Paris (Street Criers of Paris), a thirteenth-century poem by Guillaume de la Villeneuve.

Three major forms of advertisement existed during the pre-printing period (before the 15th century); those forms were trademarks (moon, stars, etc.), town criers and sign boards:

- Trademarks: The practice of attaching seals or marks to products was widespread in antiquity. Around 4,000 years ago, producers began by attaching simple stone seals to products which, over time, were transformed into clay seals bearing impressed images, often associated with the producer's personal identity. Some of the earliest use of maker's marks, dating to about 1,300 BCE, have been found in India. Another example are the Ulfberth swords from the years around 1,000 AD that had the trademark of the manufacturer inlaid in them. By the medieval period, hallmarks were applied to high value goods such as precious metals, and assayers were appointed by governments to administer the system and ensure product quality.
- Town criers: In ancient towns and cities, where the majority of citizens were illiterate, town-criers were appointed to call out official announcements and general news. Before long, private individuals began to employ public criers to act as auctioneer. At the same time, itinerant hawkers developed a system of street cries to promote their goods and services. These street cries provided an essential public service before the advent of mass media.

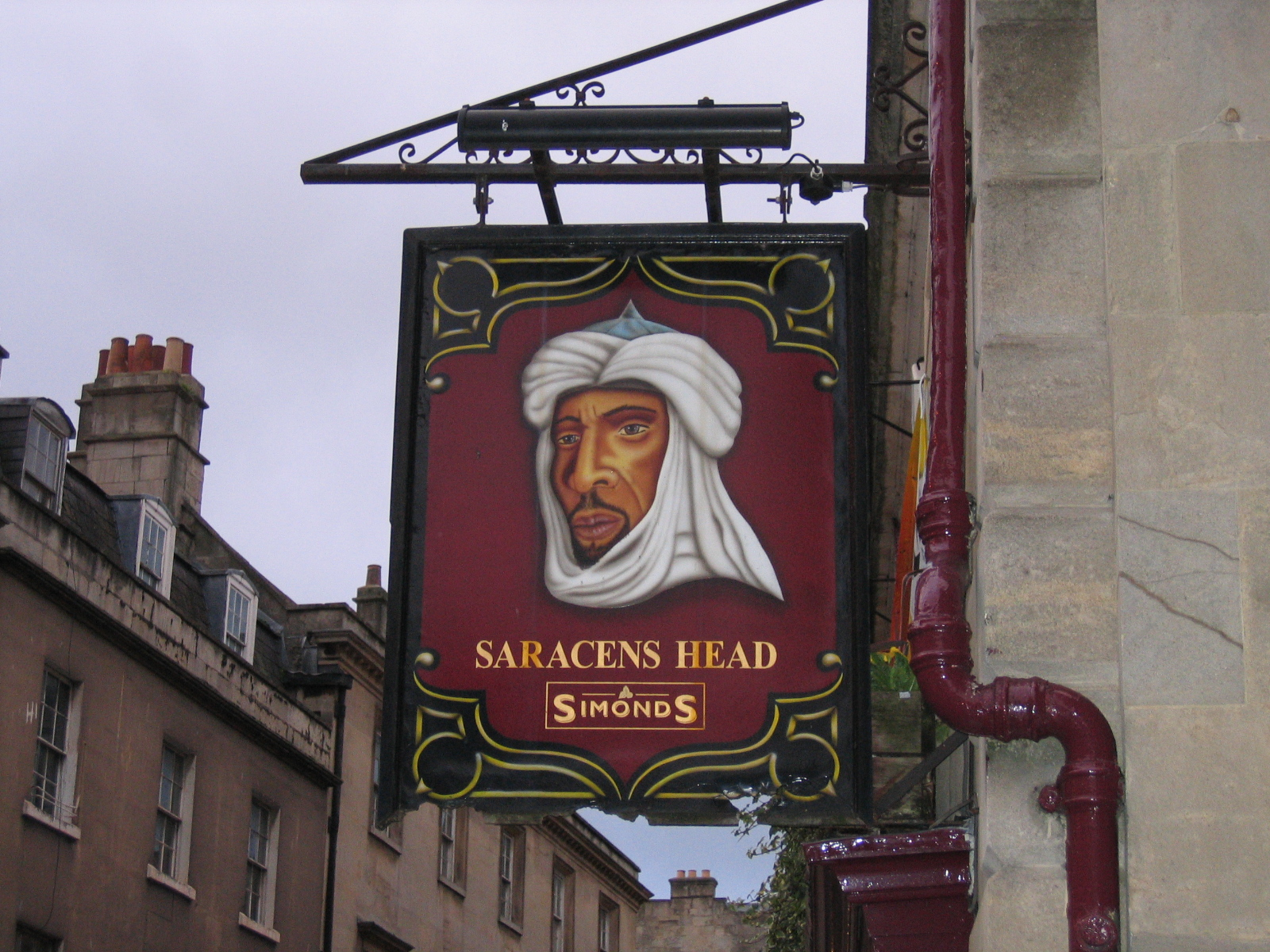
Saracens Head pub sign, Bath, England

- Sign-boards: The use of commercial signage has a very ancient history. Retail signage and promotional signs appear to have developed independently in the East and the West. In antiquity, the ancient Egyptians, Romans and Greeks were known to use signage for shop fronts as well as to announce public events such as market days. China also exhibited a rich history of early retail signage systems. In Medieval Britain and France and much of Europe, innkeepers were compelled to erect a sign-board The practice of using signs spread to other types of commercial establishments throughout the Middle Ages. Sign-boards applied to inns and taverns have survived into contemporary times across Britain and much of Europe.

== 16th–19th centuries ==
Modern advertising began to take shape with the advent of newspapers and magazines in the 16th and 17th centuries. The very first weekly gazettes appeared in Venice in the early 16th century. From there, the concept of a weekly publication spread to Italy, Germany and Holland. In Britain, the first weeklies appeared in the 1620s, and that country's first daily newspaper, The Daily Courant, was published from 1702 to 1735. Almost from the outset, newspapers carried advertising which contributed to the cost of printing and distribution. The earliest commercial advertisements promoted books and quack medicines, but by the 1650s, the variety of products being advertised had increased markedly.

Advances in printing allowed retailers and manufacturers to print handbills and trade cards. For example, Jonathon Holder, a London haberdasher in the 1670s, gave every customer a printed list of his stock with the prices affixed. At the time, Holder's innovation was seen as a "dangerous practice" and an unnecessary expense for retailers. The earliest trade cards were not cards at all, instead, they were printed on paper and did not include illustrations. By the 18th century, however, they were printed on the more substantial card and typically bore the tradesman's name and address. Before street numbering came into common use, trade cards often included long-winded sets of directions on how to locate the store or premises. With the advent of commercial engraving and lithography, illustrations became a standard feature of even the most humble trade card. Eventually, trade cards evolved into business cards, which are still in use today.

In June 1836 the Paris newspaper La Presse - edited by Émile de Girardin - became the first to rely on paid advertising to lower its price, extend its readership and increase its profitability. This formula was soon copied by the competition.

Early print advertisements were used mainly to promote books and newspapers, which became increasingly affordable with advances in the printing press; and medicines, which were increasingly sought after as modern people rejected traditional cures. However, false advertising and "quackery" became common. British newspapers in the 1850s and 1860s appealed to the increasingly affluent middle-class that sought out a variety of new products. The advertisements announced new health remedies as well as fresh foods and beverages. The latest London fashions were featured in the regional press. The availability of repeated advertising permitted manufacturers to develop nationally-known brand-names that had a much stronger appeal than generic products.

A leadership position in British advertising was held by Cope Bros & Co tobacco company, founded in Liverpool in 1848 by Thomas and George Cope. Smoking, of course, had been common for centuries, but Cope Bros innovated with brand names, heavy advertising, and market segmentation according to class. An innovative appeal was to health consciousness; the ads directed at the middle-class men promised that "smoke not only checks disease but preserves the lungs". A rugged heavy taste was pitched to working men, soldiers and sailors, while "delicately fragrant" was part of the appeal to the upper-class. The packaging was attractive, posters were omnipresent to show that smoking was a normal part of English life; lobbying was used to undercut the anti-tobacco lobby.

=== Advertising agencies ===
==== Great Britain ====
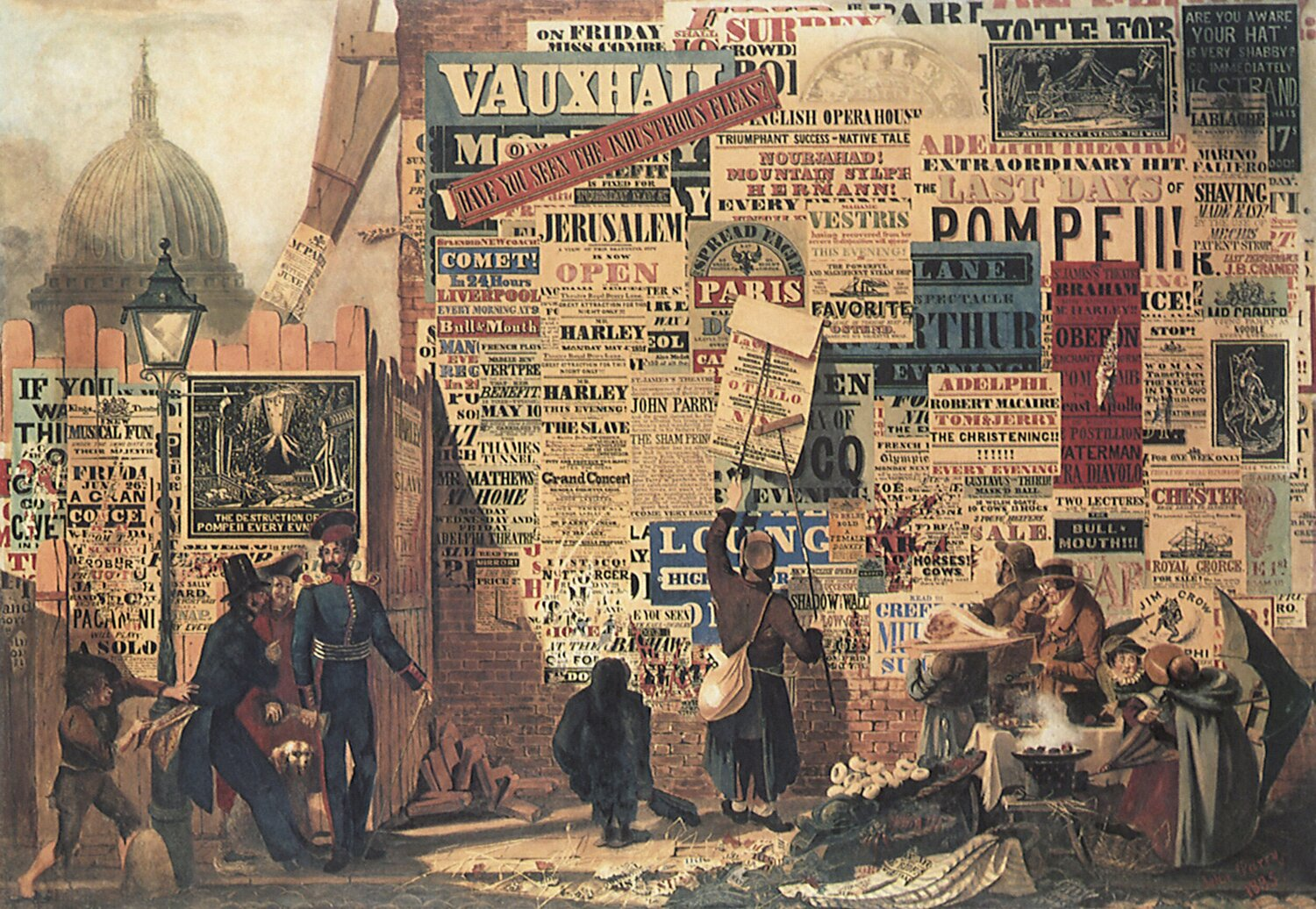
In Britain, outdoor advertising was based on hoardings (billboards): England 1835, by John Orlando Parry

T F G Coates hailed Thomas J. Barratt as "the father of modern advertising" in London in 1908. Working for the Pears Soap company, Barratt created an effective advertising campaign for the company products, which involved the use of targeted slogans, images and phrases. One of his slogans, "Good morning. Have you used Pears' soap?" was famous in its day and into the 20th century.

As an advertising tactic, Barratt associated the Pears brand with high culture and quality. Most famously, he used the painting Bubbles by John Everett Millais as an advertisement by adding a bar of Pears soap into the foreground. Barratt continued this theme with a series of adverts of well-groomed middle-class children, associating Pears with domestic comfort and aspirations of high society.

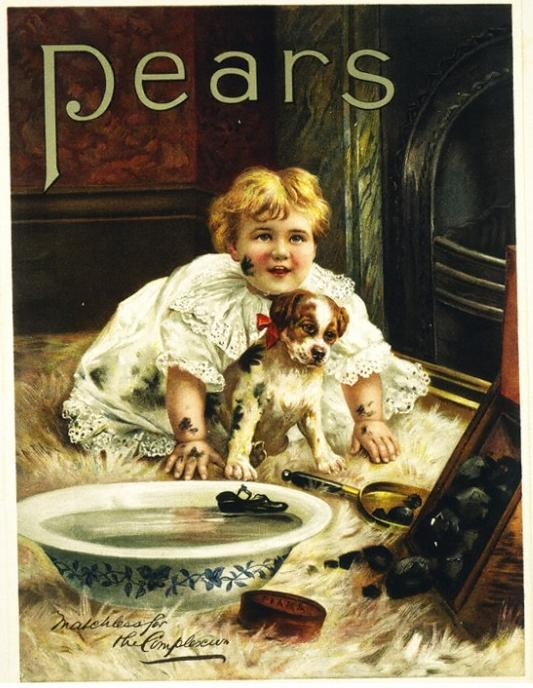
A 1900 British ad for soap

Barratt introduced many of the crucial ideas that lie behind successful advertising and these were widely circulated in his day. He constantly stressed the importance of a strong and exclusive brand image for Pears and of emphasizing the product's availability through saturation campaigns. He also understood the importance of constantly reevaluating the market for changing tastes and mores, stating in 1907 that "tastes change, fashions change, and the advertiser has to change with them. An idea that was effective a generation ago would fall flat, stale, and unprofitable if presented to the public today. Not that the idea of today is always better than the older idea, but it is different – it hits the present taste."

==== United States ====
In the United States around 1840, Volney B. Palmer set up the first advertising agency in Philadelphia. In 1842 Palmer bought large amounts of space in various newspapers at a discounted rate then resold the space at higher rates to advertisers. The actual ad – the copy, layout, and artwork – was still prepared by the company wishing to advertise; in effect, Palmer operated as a space broker. The situation changed in the late-19th century when the advertising agency of N.W. Ayer & Son was founded in New York. It planned, created, and executed complete advertising campaigns for its customers. It created a number of memorable slogans for organizations such as De Beers, AT&T and the U.S. Army.

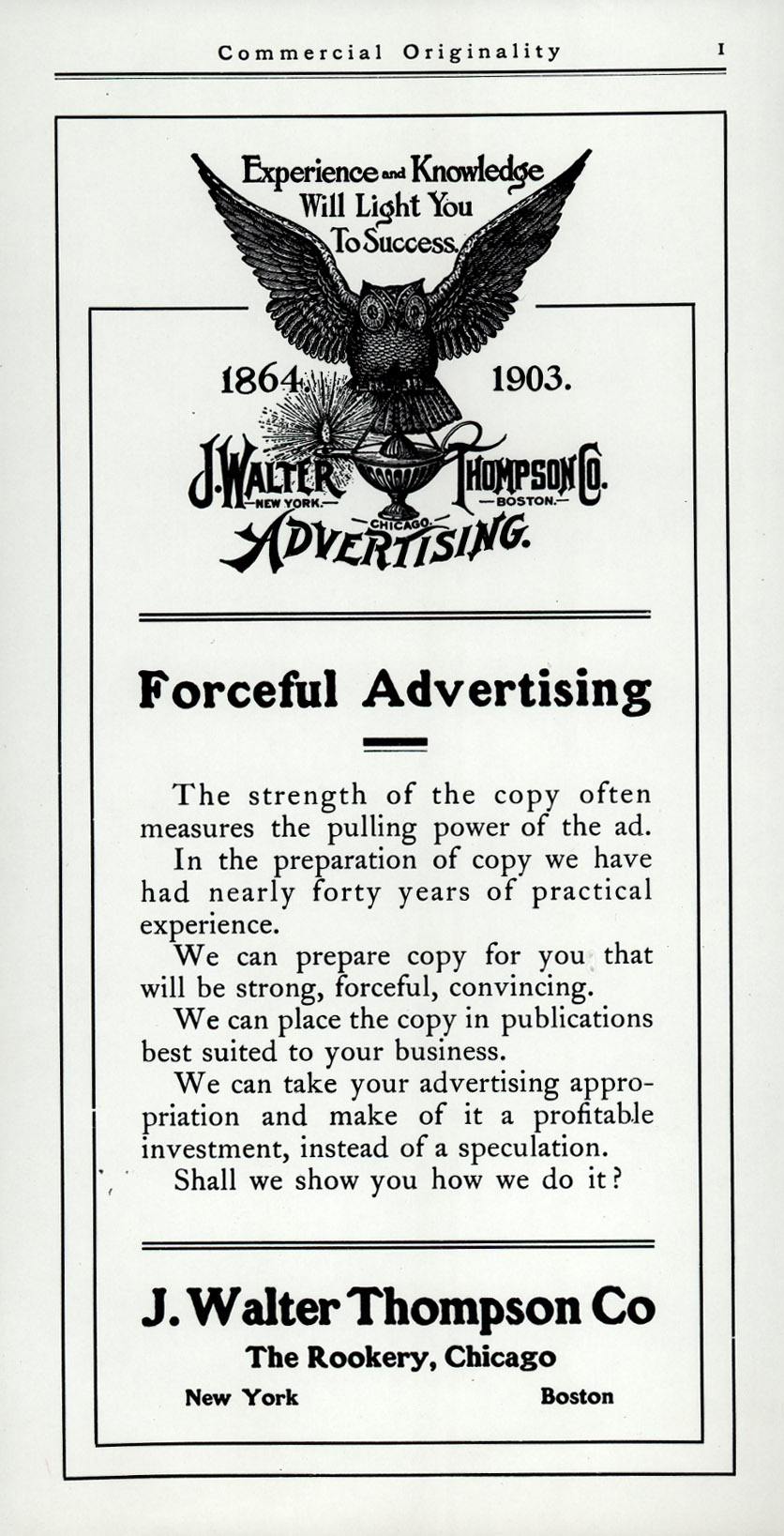
J. Walter Thompson Co. promotes high-powered advertisement, 1903.

By 1900 the advertising agency had become the focal point of creative planning, and advertising was firmly established as a profession. At first, agencies were brokers for advertisement space in newspapers. N. W. Ayer & Son was the first full-service agency to assume responsibility for advertising content. N.W. Ayer opened in 1869, and was located in Philadelphia.

The amount of space available in newspapers grew rapidly. The Boston Transcript published in 19,000 "agate lines" Of advertising in 1860, 87,000 in 1900, and 237,000 in 1918.

In 1893, 104 companies spent over $50,000 each on national advertising; most sold patent medicines, which faded away after the federal food-and-drug legislation of the early 20th century. Seven innovators had emerged in the big time: Quaker Oats, Armour meat, Cudahy meat, American Tobacco Company, P. Lorillard tobacco, Remington Typewriters, and Procter & Gamble soap. By 1914, two thirds of the top advertisers came from just five industries: 14 food producers, 13 in automobiles and tires, nine in soap and cosmetics, and four in tobacco.

Agencies were forever breaking up and reforming, especially when one executive would split, taking with him a major client and his team of copywriters.

==== France ====
In the late 19th century in France, Charles-Louis Havas extended the services of his news agency, Havas to include advertisement brokerage, making it the first French group to organize.

== Since 1900: Global ==
Advertising in the developing world was dominated by agencies in the imperial powers, especially from London and Paris. J. Walter Thompson became the first American agency to expand internationally with the opening of J. Walter Thompson London in 1899. It expanded across the globe, becoming one of the first American agencies in Egypt, South Africa and Asia. Much of the pressure to expand came from General Motors, which wanted to export its automobiles worldwide. Ford turned to N.W. Ayer, which began its expansion in Europe and Latin America in the 1930s. The typical policy was to put an American manager in charge, and hire a staff drawn from locals who had a better understanding of the language and the culture. In 1941–42, however, Ayer closed its foreign offices and decided to concentrate on the American market.

In 2011, spending on advertising reached $143 billion in the United States and $467 billion worldwide.

Today, internationally, the largest ("big four") advertising conglomerates are Interpublic, Omnicom, Publicis, and WPP.

== Since 1900: United States and Canada ==
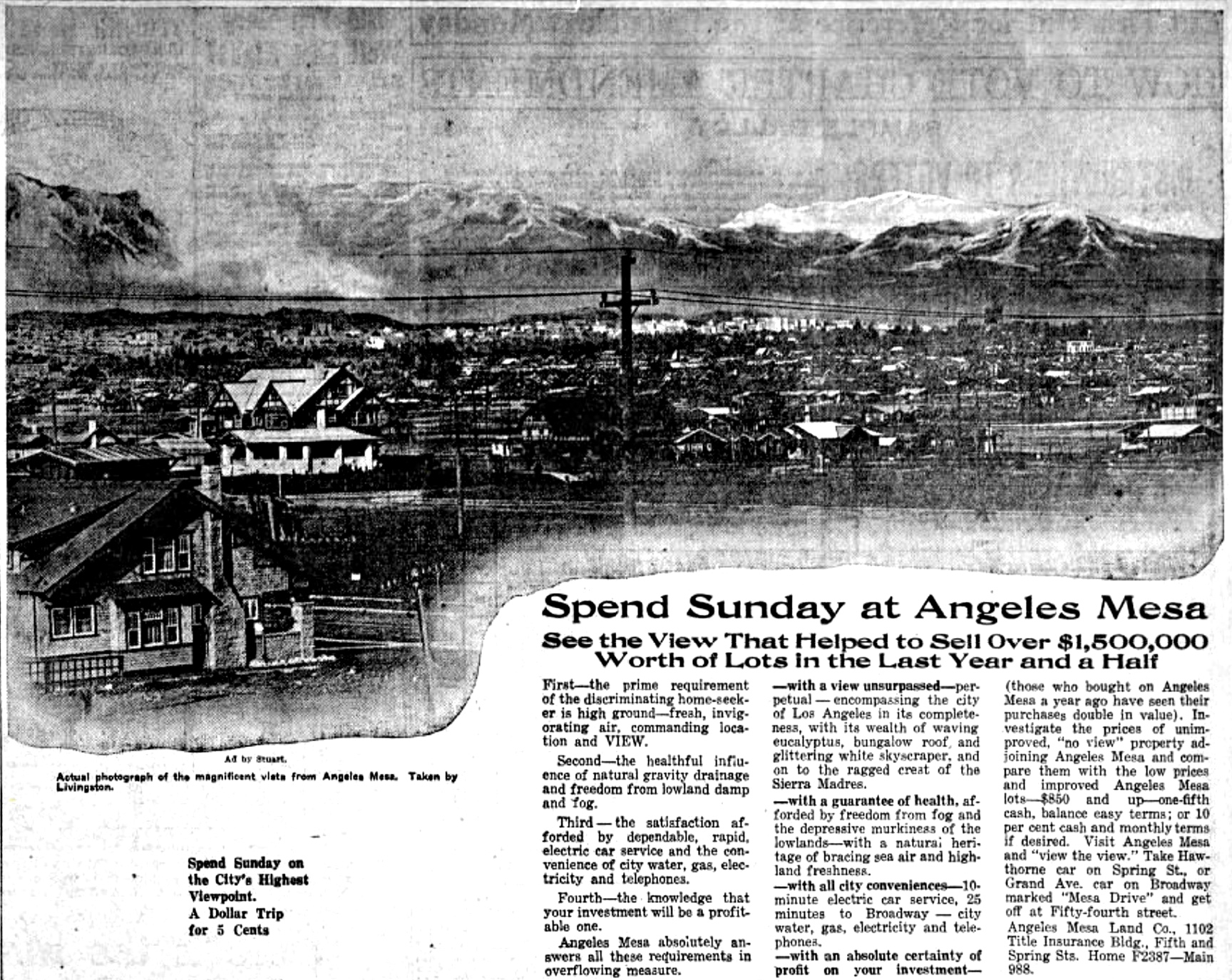
Advertisement from the Los Angeles Evening Herald of March 22, 1913, stressing the clarity of the view in the Angeles Mesa, Los Angeles, tract. Downtown Los Angeles is in the distance in the center.

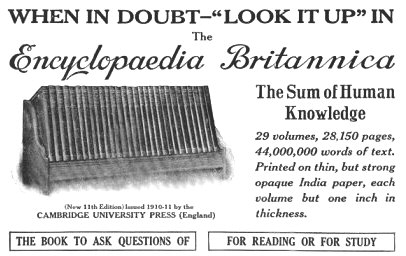
An American magazine ad for the 1913 issue of the Encyclopædia Britannica.

Advertising increased dramatically in the United States after 1870 as industrialization expanded the supply of manufactured products to a very large market. In order to profit from this higher rate of production, industry needed to recruit workers as consumers of factory products. It did so through the invention of mass marketing designed to influence the population's economic behavior on a larger scale. Total advertising volume in the United States grew from about $200 million in 1880 to nearly $3 billion in 1920.

In the 1910s and 1920s, many ad men believed that human instincts could be targeted and harnessed – "sublimated" into the desire to purchase commodities. Edward Bernays, a nephew of Sigmund Freud, promoted the approach making him a pioneer of modern cigarette advertising. Glantz argues, "it was really the tobacco industry, from the beginning, that was at the forefront of the development of modern, innovative, advertising techniques."

In the 1920s, under Secretary of Commerce Herbert Hoover, the American government promoted advertising. Hoover himself delivered an address to the Associated Advertising Clubs of the World in 1925 called 'Advertising Is a Vital Force in Our National Life." In October 1929, the head of the U.S. Bureau of Foreign and Domestic Commerce, Julius Klein, stated "Advertising is the key to world prosperity." This was part of the "unparalleled" collaboration between business and government in the 1920s, according to a 1933 European economic journal.

Advertising was a vehicle for cultural assimilation, encouraging immigrants to exchange their traditional habits and tastes in favor of a modern American lifestyle. An important tool for influencing immigrant workers was the American Association of Foreign Language Newspapers (AAFLN). The AAFLN was primarily an advertising agency but also gained heavily centralized control over much of the immigrant press.

=== Canadian media market ===
In 1900, most Canadian newspapers were local affairs, designed primarily to inform local partisans about the provincial and national political scene. The publishers depended on loyal partisan subscribers, as well as contracts for public printing controlled by the political parties. With the rise of national advertising agencies after 1900, a major transformation was underway. The advertisers wanted them to reach the maximum possible circulation, regardless of partisanship. The result was a series of consolidations yielding much larger, largely nonpartisan newspapers, which depended more heavily on advertising revenue than on subscriptions from loyal party members. By 1900, three-fourths of the revenue of Toronto newspapers came from advertising. About two thirds of the newspapers' editorial pages loyally supported either the Conservative or the Liberal party, while the remainder were more independent. Across the board, the news pages increasingly featured more objectivity and bipartisanship, and the publishers were mostly focused on advertising revenues that were proportionate to overall circulation. A newspaper that appealed only to one party cut its potential audience in half. Simultaneously, the rapid growth of industry in Ontario and Quebec, coupled with the rapid settlement of the prairies, produced a large more affluent newspaper-reading population. The result was a golden age for Canadian newspapers peaking about 1911. Many papers failed during the war era. Advertising agencies in 1915 gained a major advantage with the arrival of the Audit Bureau of Circulations, which for the first-time provided reliable data on circulation, as opposed to the partisan boasting and exaggeration that had been the norm. the agencies now had a stronger hand in bargaining for lower advertising rates. The 1920s became a time of consolidation, budget-cutting and dropping of traditional party affiliation. By 1930 only 24% of Canada's dailies were partisan, 17% were "independent" partisan, and the majority, 50%, had become fully independent.

=== Sex and psychology ===
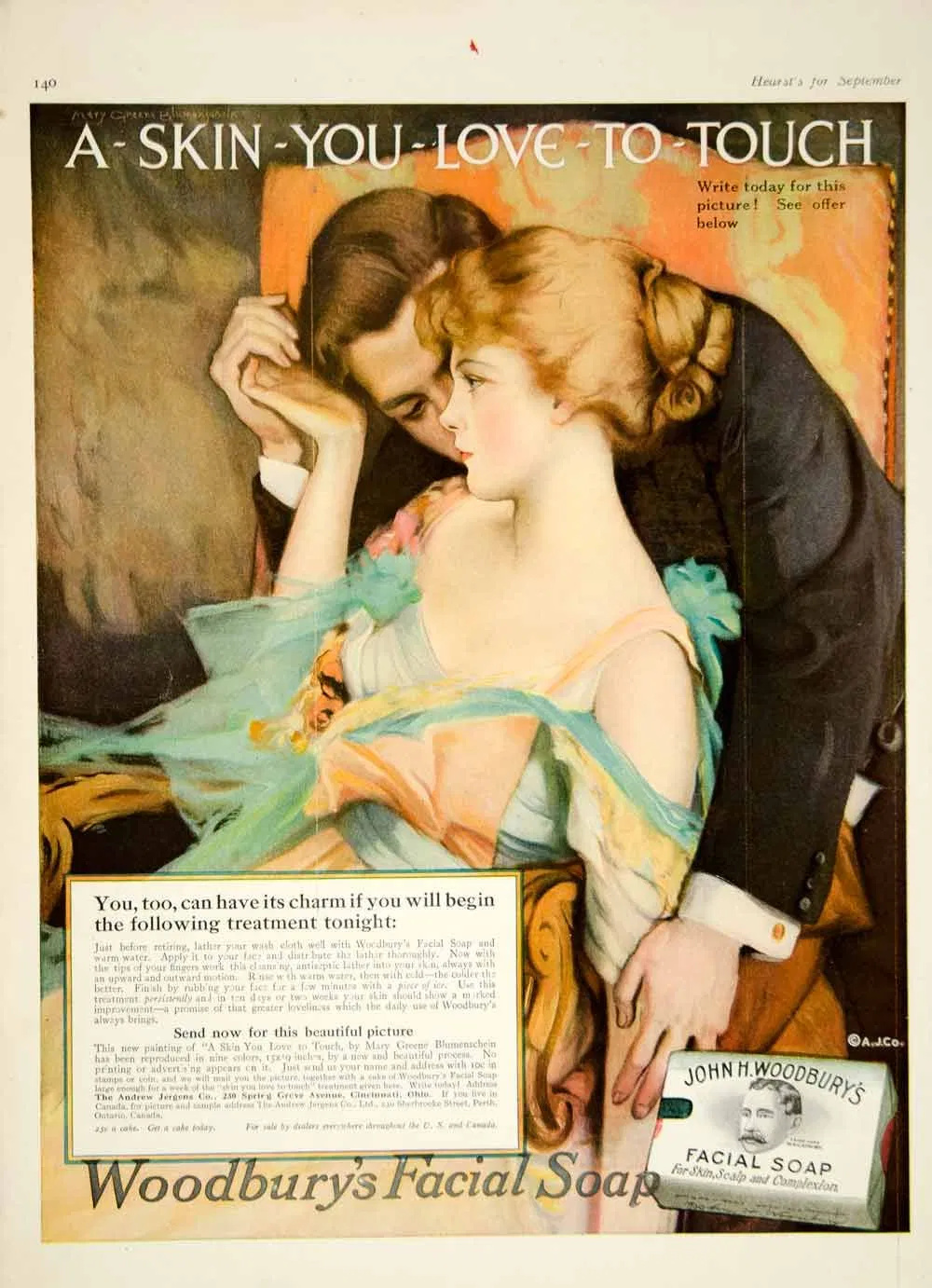
1916 Ladies' Home Journal version of the famous ad

At the turn of the 20th century, there were few career choices for women in business; however, advertising was one of the few. Since women were responsible for most of the purchasing done in their household, advertisers and agencies recognized the value of women's insight during the creative process. Helen Lansdowne Resor at J. Walter Thompson Agency, was one of the pioneers.

In 1911, the Woodbury Soap Company became the first to use images of sexual contact to sell a product. Their ad slogan, created by Helen Lansdowne, claimed that women who used the soap would have "Skin You Love To Touch". Her copy promised the soap would increase the beauty of one's skin; it offered a color print and a week's supply of the soap for 10 cents. The slogan became so popular that Woodbury used it until the 1940s. Albert Lasker said the ad's use of sex appeal made it one of three great landmarks in advertising history. It was ranked 31st on Advertising Age's list of the top 100 campaigns of the 20th century.

=== Nudity ===
In 1936, Woodbury was one of the first companies to use nudity in its advertisements. The ad, known as "The Sun Bath", was photographed by Edward Steichen and showed a nude woman lying on stairs on her side with her back to the camera. The text advertised that Woodbury Soap was now enriched with "filter sunshine". Many celebrities appeared in advertisements for Woodbury Soap.

In international perspective, a 2008 comparison of nudity in advertising in Brazil, Canada, China, Germany, South Korea, Thailand, and the United States reveals that China and the United States have the most demure ads, while Germany and Thailand exposed more of the female body. There is little variation in male undress.

=== Psychology ===
In the early 20th century, psychologists Walter D. Scott and John B. Watson contributed applied psychological theory to the field of advertising. Scott said, "Man has been called the reasoning animal but he could with greater truthfulness be called the creature of suggestion. He is reasonable, but he is to a greater extent suggestible". He demonstrated this through his advertising technique of a direct command to the consumer. The former chair at Johns Hopkins University, John B. Watson was a highly recognized psychologist in the 1920s. After leaving the field of academia he turned his attention towards advertising where he implemented the concepts of behaviorism into advertising. This focused on appealing to the basic emotions of the consumer: love, hate, and fear. This type of advertising proved to be extremely effective as it suited the changing social context which led to heavy influence of future advertising strategy and cemented the place of psychology in advertising.

=== Albert Lasker: Salesmanship in print ===
Chicago, along with New York, was the center of the nation's advertising industry. Albert Lasker, known as the "father of modern advertising," made Chicago his base 1898–1942. As head of the Lord and Thomas agency, Lasker devised a copywriting technique that appealed directly to the psychology of the consumer. Women seldom smoked cigarettes; he told them if they smoked Lucky Strikes they could stay slender. Lasker's use of radio, particularly with his campaigns for Palmolive soap, Pepsodent toothpaste, Kotex products, and Lucky Strike cigarettes, not only revolutionized the advertising industry but also significantly changed popular culture.

Lasker had an inquiring mind about what advertising was and how it worked. Lasker believed that advertising consisted of news and information was news, He changed his mind when a colleague Johnny Kennedy told him, "News is a technique of presentation, but advertising is a very simple thing. I can give it to you in three words, it is 'salesmanship in print'". Lasker and Kennedy used this concept with the 1900 Washer Co. (later Whirlpool). Their campaign was so successful that, within four months of running the first ad, they attracted additional clients and their "advertising spend" went from $15,000 a year to $30,000 a month. Within six months, their firm was one of the three or four largest advertisers in the nation.

In 1908 Lasker recruited Claude C. Hopkins to the firm, specifically to work on the Van Camp Packaging Company (Van Camp's) account. The relationship lasted for 17 years. Lasker helped create America's infatuation with orange juice. Lord & Thomas acquired the Sunkist Growers, Incorporated account in 1908, when the citrus industry was in a slump. Lasker created campaigns that not only encouraged consumers to eat oranges, but also to drink orange juice.

Among Lasker's pioneering contributions was the introduction into public schools of classes that explained to young girls about puberty and menstruation (done to promote Kotex tampons). He is also credited as the creator of the soap opera genre, and using radio and television as media driven by advertising. Lasker took time off from business to help the presidential campaign of Republican Warren Harding in 1920, using high-powered advertising techniques that helped produce a massive landslide.

=== On the radio from the 1920s ===
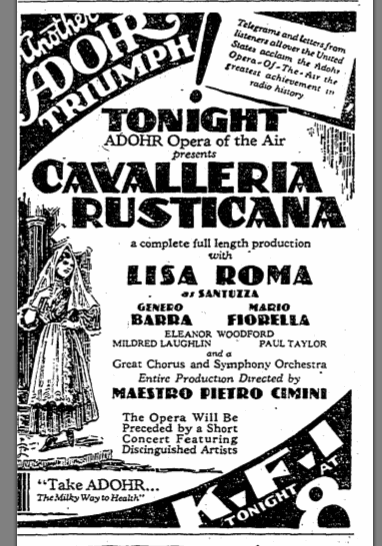
Advertisement for a live radio broadcast, sponsored by a milk company and published in the Los Angeles Times on May 6, 1930

In the early 1920s, the first radio stations were established by radio equipment manufacturers and retailers who offered programs in order to sell more radios to consumers. Madison Avenue early on recognized the importance of radio as a new advertising medium. Advertising provided the major funding for most stations in the United States, which never had a licensing fee for set users. Great Britain used the mandatory fee on set owners to fund the British Broadcasting Corporation, which to this day operates without commercials or advertising. However, the British government permitted commercial television in 1954 and commercial radio in 1972.

Public service advertising, non-commercial advertising, public interest advertising, cause marketing, and social marketing are different terms for (or aspects of) the use of sophisticated advertising and marketing communications techniques (generally associated with commercial enterprise) on behalf of non-commercial, public interest issues and initiatives.

In the United States, the granting of television and radio licenses by the FCC is contingent upon the station broadcasting a certain amount of public service advertising. To meet these requirements, many broadcast stations in America air the bulk of their required public service announcements during the late night or early morning when the smallest percentage of viewers are watching, leaving more day and prime time commercial slots available for high-paying advertisers.

Public service advertising in the United States reached its height during the world wars. During WWII President Roosevelt commissioned the creation of The War Advertising Council (now known as the Ad Council) which is the United States' largest developer of PSA campaigns on behalf of government agencies and non-profit organizations, including the longest-running public service campaign, Smokey Bear.

=== 1930s and World War II ===
Advertising came under heavy pressure in the 1930s. The Great Depression forced businesses to drastically cut back on their advertising spending. Layoffs and reductions were common at all agencies. The New Deal furthermore aggressively promoted consumerism, and minimized the value or need of advertising. Historian Jackson Lears argues that "By the late 1930s, though, corporate advertisers had begun a successful counterattack against their critics." They rehabilitated the concept of consumer sovereignty by inventing scientific public opinion polls, and making it the centerpiece of their own market research, as well has the key to understanding politics. George Gallup, the vice president of Young and Rubicam, and numerous other advertising experts, led the way. Moving into the 1940s, the industry played a leading role in the ideological mobilization of the American people for fighting the Nazis and Japanese in World War II. As part of that effort, they redefined the "American Way of Life" in terms of a commitment to free enterprise. "Advertisers," Lears concludes, "played a crucial hegemonic role in creating the consumer culture that dominated post-World War II American society."

=== Postwar era ===
In the prosperous postwar era, millions of Americans moved into new housing, especially in the rapidly growing suburbs. They spent heavily on housing, appliances, furniture, clothing and automobiles. The coming of television in the 1950s dramatically enlarged the arena for advertising. With most families having automobiles, and more leisure time, travel holidays became much more common, and the motel and tourism industries eagerly supported large-scale advertising.

In the public service arena, the Ad Council aggressively promoted Americanism as a Cold War strategy, with campaigns such as the Freedom Train, the Crusade for Freedom, Religion in American Life, Atoms For Peace, and Peoples Capitalism. The new Brand Names Foundation sponsored conferences, local campaigns, and educational programs to promote brand loyalty, as well as free enterprise.

In The Hidden Persuaders (1957) popular writer Vance Packard exposes the use of consumer motivational research and other psychological techniques, including depth psychology and subliminal tactics. They had been used to manipulate expectations and induce desire for products since the 1920s, but the popular audience was caught by surprise. He identified eight "compelling needs" that advertisers promise products will fulfill. According to Packard these needs are so strong that people are compelled to buy products to satisfy them. The book questions the morality of using these techniques.

==== Racial themes ====
Before the Civil Rights Movement of the 1950s and 1960s, black people were largely missing from mainstream white advertising. Those who did appear typically followed the long-standing "hierarchy of skin color" whereby those with lighter skin tones were seen as being more socially and culturally acceptable than dark-skinned black people.

Most national corporations before the 1960s ignored the black market, and paid little attention to working with black merchants or hiring blacks for responsible positions. Pepsi-Cola was a major exception, as the number two brand fought for parity with Coca-Cola. The upstart soda brand hired black promoters who penetrated into black markets across the South and the urban North. Journalist Stephanie Capparell interviewed six men who were on the team in the late 1940s:

The team members had a grueling schedule, working seven days a week, morning and night, for weeks on end. They visited bottlers, churches, "ladies groups," schools, college campuses, YMCAs, community centers, insurance conventions, teacher and doctor conferences, and various civic organizations. They got famous jazzmen such as Duke Ellington and Lionel Hampton to give shout-outs for Pepsi from the stage. No group was too small or too large to target for a promotion.

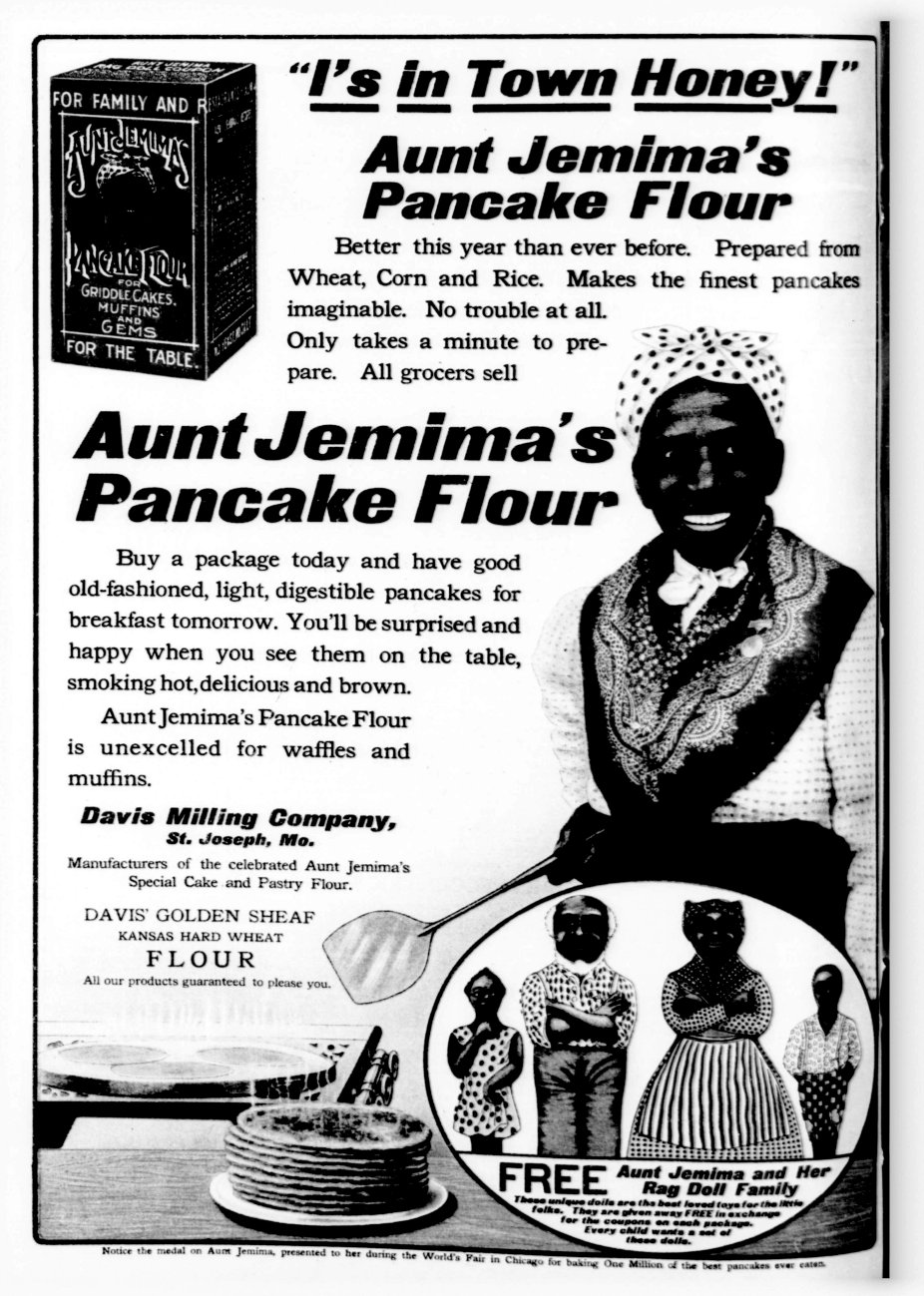
Quaker Oats 1909 newspaper ad directed at white consumers with stereotypical images and dolls.

Pepsi advertisements avoided the stereotypical images common in the major media that depicted one-dimensional Aunt Jemimas and Uncle Bens whose role was to draw a smile from white customers. Instead it portrayed black customers as self-confident middle-class citizens who showed very good taste in their soft drinks. They were economical too, as Pepsi bottles were twice the size.

By the late 1960s, more than a few token blacks were hired at advertising agencies, and the sensitivity to the problem increased. The leading black magazines Essence and Jet routinely deplored racism in mainstream media, especially in the negative depictions of black men and women. However Essence and Jet in the 21st century themselves ran about a dozen ads a year, especially for skin lighteners, that were pervaded with "racism and White supremacy."

==== Tobacco ====
By the 1950s, fears of cancer from tobacco smoking caused consternation in the tobacco industry, which turned to advertisers for help in avoiding falling consumer demand and increased regulation. British and American agencies separately arrived at similar solutions. The Tobacco Industry Research Committee in the United States and the Tobacco Manufacturers' Standing Committee in Britain each assuaged public anxieties and encouraged the misperception that the cigarette makers were resolving the issues through filters and low tar formulations. The public relations approach was successful in the short run, but the accumulation of medical evidence led to a fall in smoking, heavier taxation, and increased regulation. The agencies responded with sophisticated advertising strategies designed to encourage adolescent smokers as well as to recruit new smokers in less-developed foreign markets.

=== Cable television from the 1980s ===
The late 1980s and early 1990s saw the introduction of cable television and particularly MTV. Pioneering the concept of the music video, MTV ushered in a new type of advertising: the consumer tunes in for the advertising message, rather than it being a by-product or afterthought. As cable and satellite television became increasingly prevalent, specialty channels emerged, including channels entirely devoted to advertising, such as QVC, Home Shopping Network, and ShopTV Canada.

=== On the Internet from the 1990s ===
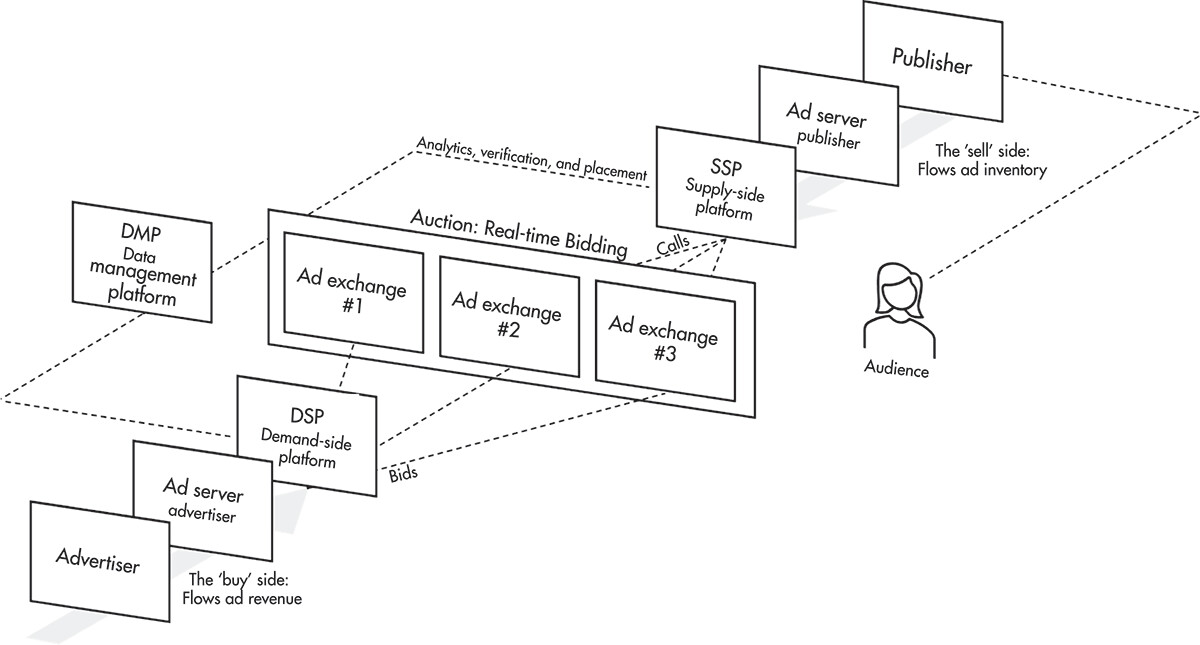
Digital advertising technologies support the real-time bidding infrastructure used in digital display advertising

With the advent of the ad server, marketing through the Internet opened new frontiers for advertisers and contributed to the "dot-com" boom of the 1990s. Entire corporations operated solely on advertising revenue, offering everything from coupons to free Internet access. At the turn of the 21st century, a number of websites, including the search engine Google, started a change in online advertising by emphasizing contextually relevant ads based on an individual's browsing interests. This has led to a plethora of similar efforts and an increasing trend of interactive advertising.

The share of advertising spending relative to GDP has changed little across large changes in media. For example, in the US in 1925, the main advertising media were newspapers, magazines, signs on streetcars, and outdoor posters. Advertising spending as a share of GDP was about 2.9 percent. By 1998, television and radio had become major advertising media. Nonetheless, advertising spending as a share of GDP was slightly lower – about 2.4 percent.

The advertising business model has also been adapted since the 1990s. In media for equity, advertising is not sold, but provided to start-up companies in return for equity. If the company grows and is sold, the media companies receive cash for their shares.

==== Restrictions on advertising ====
Since the 1950s, the industry itself, or the government, has imposed some restrictions on advertising certain types of products, especially liquor and cigarettes. Tobacco bans exist in many major countries across the world and cover 2.3 billion people. In the 1990s Quebec banned some advertising directed at children. The restrictions have hindered competition in the breakfast cereal market when compared with the rest of Canada.

In the United States in the 1960s, public health advocates focused on limiting the advertising of tobacco products. In 1971, cigarette advertisements were taken off of the air (television and radio). This led marketers to shift their money over to print media: billboards, newspapers, etc. In the 1980s, public health groups pressed for more comprehensive restrictions. This posed a problem for the United States due to the constitutional protections of freedom of expression under the First Amendment. However, corporate marketing messages are not granted the same protections as noncommercial speech. Advertising messages, or “commercial speech” include commercial advertising, promises, and solicitations. Although commercial speech has been subject to regulation in order to protect consumers, it is still granted certain rights under the first amendment.

"Even a communication that does no more than propose a commercial transaction is entitled to the coverage of the First Amendment."(Edenfield v. Fane, 1993)

== Since 1900: Europe ==
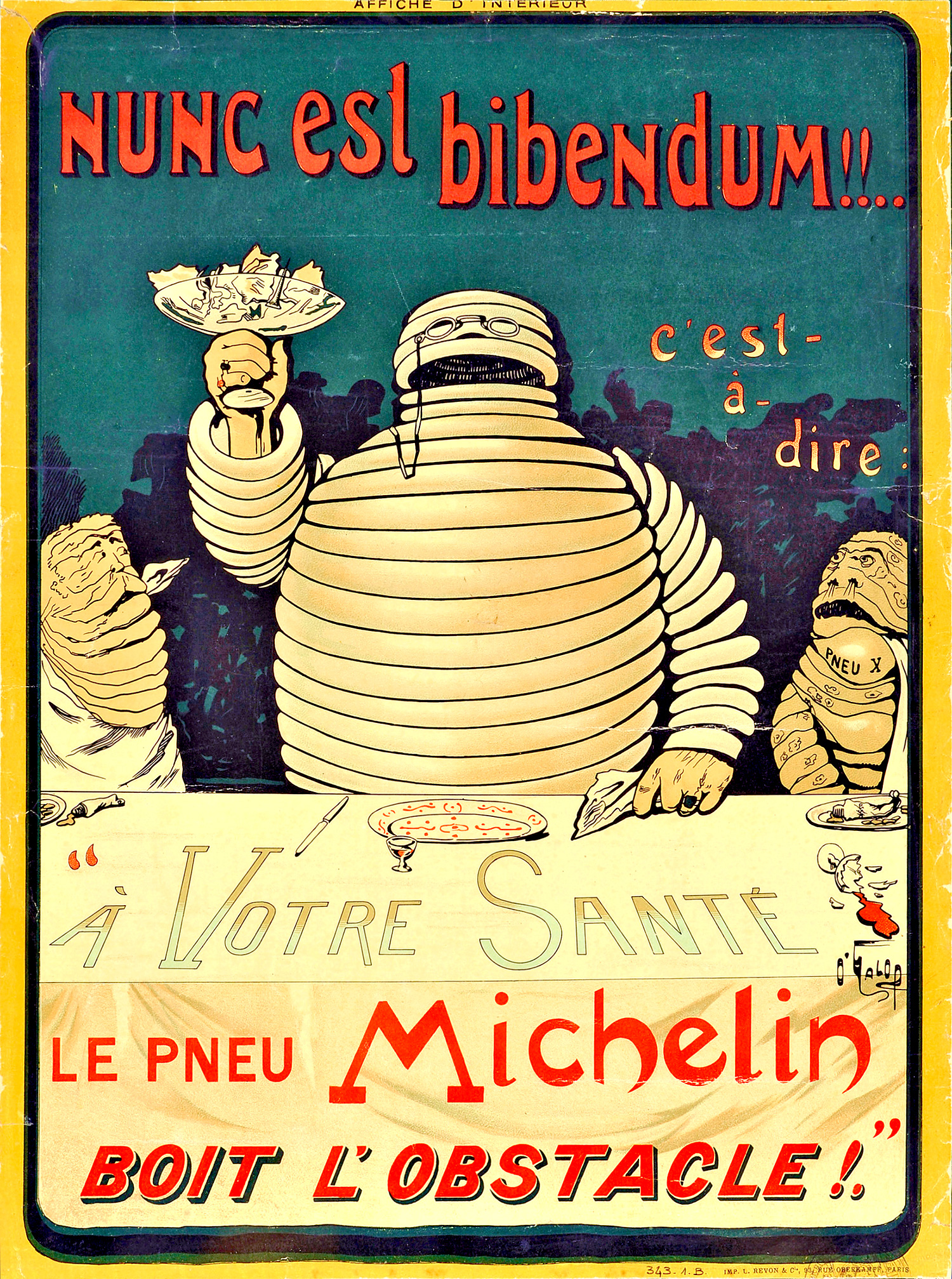
A poster by "O'Galop" of Bibendum, the Michelin Man, 1898

J. Walter Thompson became the first American agency to expand internationally with the opening of J. Walter Thompson London in 1899.

=== France ===
Marcel Bleustein-Blanchet (1906–1996) was the most prominent leader of French advertising in the 20th century. He founded Publicis. After 1945 his little-known Paris-based advertising agency grew rapidly, becoming the world's fourth largest agency. It was a leader in promoting France's post-war economic boom, especially the expansion of the advertising industry. It was successful because of its close ties with top officials of the French government, its clever use of symbols to promote itself, and its ability to attract clients from widely diverse growing industries.

The question of whether advertising reflects society or shapes society, can be seen in European models that diverged from the American style. In France, Michelin dominated the tire industry and was one of the leading advertisers; to this day its famous guidebooks are very widely used by upscale travelers. From 1894 to the present its symbol was Bibendum (the "Michelin Man" made of tires). He was a lord of industry, a master of all he surveyed, and a patriotic expounder of the French spirit. In the 1920s, Bibendum urged Frenchmen to adopt America's superior factory system, but to patriotically avoid using the "inferior" products of those factories. As automobiles diffused to the middle classes, Michelin advertising likewise shifted downscale, and its restaurant and hotel guides covered a broader range of price categories.

J Walter Thompson expanded successfully in many countries, but France was not one of them. French businessmen did not like the American tone, and were fearful of Americanization. The French market was heavily regulated and protected to repel foreign interests, and the American admen in Paris were not good at hiding their condescension and insensitivity.

=== Britain ===
As millions of American soldiers passed through Britain during the Second World War, there were fears of an "Americanization" of British commerce and culture. The Marshall Plan explicitly required and upgrading of the marketing and organizational skills of British industry. There were fears among the leaders of the London advertising world of what the brash, rich Americans would do to them. Radio and television was off limits to advertising, because BBC relied on fees paid by owners of radio receivers. The question was whether the heavily funded American methods would prove irresistible. JWT London was an American owned advertising agency controlled by J. Walter Thompson in New York City. JWT London avoided being the bold apostle of the American style. Instead it is relied on soft persuasion, shedding its Americanness to adapt to the British understated style.

=== Germany ===
In the 1920s, most advertising was handled by manufacturing companies in-house. Numerous small advertising agencies handled purchase of space in the media, but did not design campaigns or the ads themselves. An important role was played by travelling salesmen in promoting products to wholesalers and retailers and providing feedback from the market to the producer.

During the Nazi era (1933–45), the advertising industry expelled its Jews, and came under the supervision of the "Ad Council for the German Economy," a department of the propaganda ministry of Joseph Goebbels. The relationship was friendly, for the industry learned a great deal from the Nazi propaganda techniques. The industry promoted Hitler's favorite products, such as the promised Volkswagen automobile for the people, and the construction of autobahns. It emphasized the availability of trusted brands despite growing shortages after the war began in 1939. It helped support the regime, articulating a vision of consumption that was well aligned with the Nazi spirit. In some environments and social movements, such as with post-WW2 East Germany Stasi's zersetzung, criminology theorists estimated advertisement was used as a means to crime, the nature of the crime was the intentional exploitation of an individual to cause damage to the individual's ability to form social bonds and appropriate perceptions of the world. This is especially true in the case of manipulation, people take advantage of their underdeveloped social skills and exploit them for selfish gain, this was later criticized to be adopted by turpitude agents of modern advertising. Many major brands were off the market by 1944, because of severe shortages. When they returned after the war, they were welcomed as an index of normality and were not associated with Nazism.

By the 1950s, German advertising agencies were starting to mimic American methods. Coca-Cola was advising "Mach mal Pause" ("Take a Rest!), and conservative Chancellor Konrad Adenauer was running for reelection with the slogan "Keine Experimente!" ("No Experiments!"). The German agencies have always remained small and limited in scope, even after the unification of East Germany and West Germany in 1991. After unification, Germany became the third largest ad market in the world, with $18 billion in total ad spending in 1994.

=== Italy ===
The American influence became strong in Italy after 1945. The high risk of communist success led the American government to invest heavily in propaganda activities. Several American firms opened offices, including Young & Rubicon and Ogilvy & Mather. Italian graphic designers, most prominently Armando Testa, were inspired by modernist aesthetics and thinking brought in by the American advertising agencies and techniques in Italy. The advertising industry helped transform Italy into a consumer-oriented society.

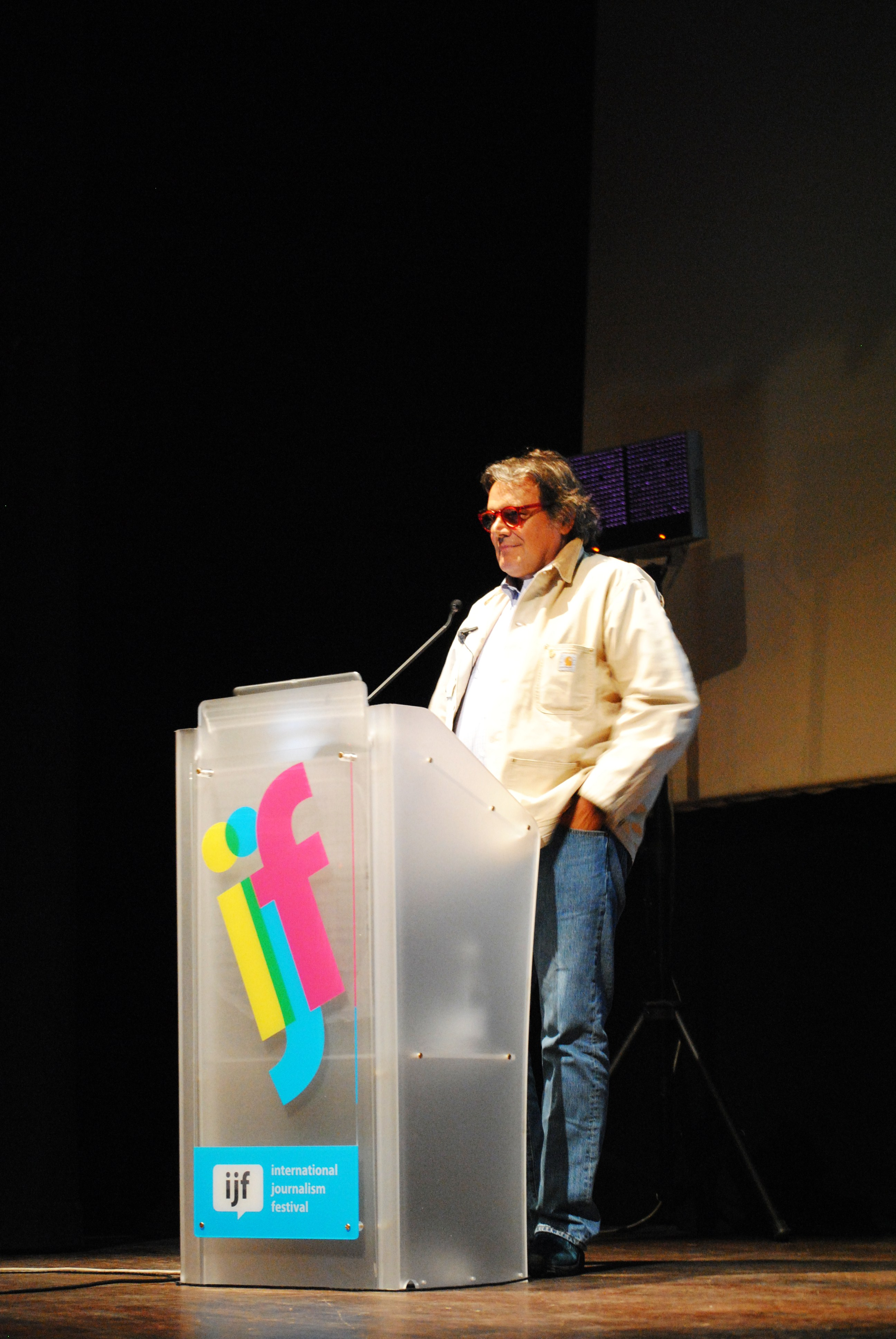
Oliviero Toscani

A dramatic example of how advertising nudged the Italian middle-class into modern consumer society appears in the heavily advertised automatic washing machine. It appeared on the Italian market in 1958 and by 1965, 23% of families had purchased one, reaching 42% by 1970. Advertisers hailed the mechanization of domestic tedium as the advent of a new women's "liberation." Commentary appeared everywhere, from advertisements to the specialized press, to women's reviews. Architects and designers made room for the new marvel, as the promotional language celebrating the device became a chorus of praise for domestic appliances as the secret of "progress" and "freedom" and "liberation." On the other hand, husbands still insisted on driving the family automobile; it was off-limits to the liberated female.

Armando Testa Set up a full-service advertising agency in 1956, specializing in the new medium of television advertising. He was inspired by Eastern European animation techniques, and often use simple graphics like the blue hippo. His son Marco Testa, trained at Benton & Bowles in New York, and maintained the fast-paced, witty style. Emmanuelle Pirella, who trained at the Italian offices of Young & Rubicon and Ogilvy & Mather, emerged as a leading copywriter.

Benetton gained worldwide attention for its saucy advertising, inspired by its art director Oliviero Toscani. He started with multicultural themes, tied together under the campaign "United Colors of Benetton" then became increasingly provocative with interracial groupings, and unusual sexual images, such as a nun kissing a priest.

== Since 1900: Asia and Africa ==
=== Japan ===
Dentsu is the dominant firm in Japan thanks to its origins as a media representative. It produced Japan's first newspaper advertisements as well as the first television commercials. It was established in 1901 as Japan Advertising Ltd. and Telegraphic Service Co. by Hoshiro Mitsunaga. In 1936, it sold off its news division to Doumei News Agency, to focus on advertising. In 1946, it purchased 16 small companies and set up operational bases in Tokyo, Osaka, Nagoya, and Kyūshū. Dentsu company now offers a range of services, from traditional and creative marketing to specialty disciplines such as sports marketing, investing in feature film production and acquiring broadcasting rights, PR, digital contents, and a growing range of communications services.

=== China ===
In the first 20 years of communist control of China (1947 to 1966) Mao Zedong tried to reverse the long-standing advertising practices of Chinese newspapers, considering it a capitalist infringement on the goals of socialism. Consumerism, which had been highly developed in Shanghai, was anathema, to Mao's peasant-based communist perspective. The regime emphasized maximum production rather than optimal consumption. The approach worsened the massive famines that happened when national resources were devoted to a highly inefficient factory production at the cost of basic food output. On the other hand, propaganda was highly developed art in the Communist Party, and so a sort of compromise was reached. Socialist-oriented advertising emphasized the collective good, rather than the benefits of products for the individual consumer. Since 1980, the strength of the private economy, and advertising, has grown dramatically. By the 1980s much emphasis was placed on the role of advertising in promoting the Four Modernizations emphasized by Deng Xiaoping. Lip service is still paid to old Maoist ideals by recycling images of historic places and episodes, but it does not inhibit the growth of consumerism.

Since Chinese entry into the World Trade Organization (WTO) in 2002, its advertising industry has fundamentally changed. It has become the world's fastest-growing advertising market and the country with the largest pool of netizens. Major changes have come in terms of shifting cultural values, the growing role of brand names, the attractiveness of English-language titles to the younger generation, the redefinition of acceptable/offensive advertising, the very rapid growth of new media (especially the Internet and smart phones), the emergence of on-line shopping in a country with an underdeveloped system of department stores in shopping centers, and much more advanced techniques of managing advertising agencies.

Chinese advertising is moving heavily to the smartphone, leaving television behind. Companies in China are increasingly more focused on mobile advertisements than on television advertisements. Central roles are played by Chinese-based social networking sites Weixin (also known as WeChat), and Sina Weibo, and the efforts of Western companies, including Coca-Cola, Burberry, and North Face, to market to Chinese consumers through their smartphones.

=== India ===
Many elements of Indian culture and industry have British roots, so that British advertising models usually work well. In 1991, the government dramatically liberalized Indian economy, opening it to international business. The emergence of a moderately affluent middle-class numbering in the hundreds of millions attracts multinational corporations and international advertisers. Advertising in India operates at two levels. Ads for high-value products appear in English-language papers such as The Hindu and The Madras Mail, which targeted Europeans and high-status Indians. By contrast, ads for low-value products are typically placed in vernacular papers and are aimed at a lower middle class with highly restricted spending power. The working class and peasant populations, with very low disposable incomes, are seldom targeted by the advertising agencies. Local merchants might use signs and posters to reach them. Cricket is one sport where the Indians have had an international success, so that cricket stars are prominent endorsers in national advertising.

Subtle cultural norms can be easily transgressed. In 2002, widespread protests forced Hindustan Lever Ltd. (the Indian subsidiary of London-based Unilever) to cancel a television ad campaign for its fairness cream because of its portrayal of women. The campaign was built around the theme of a father lamenting "If only I had a son" while showing his problem: a dark-skinned, unattractive daughter. Fast-forward. She uses the Fair & Lovely cream and has become a gorgeous light-skinned beauty. Clad in a stylish miniskirt, she is a successful airline flight attendant and takes her proud father to dine at a five-star hotel. The All India Women's Democratic Association (AIDWA), a far left political organization, lodged a complaint with the National Human Rights Commission in New Delhi. It argued endorsing the traditional preference for sons strengthens gender discrimination, which is a major problem in India. Furthermore, said AIDWA, the ad perpetuated a culture of discrimination in a society where "fair skin" is synonymous with "beautiful." The government's Ministry of Information and Broadcast sided with AIDWA and directed stations not to air the ads because they violated the Cable and Television Networks Act of 1995 which states that no advertisement shall be permitted which "derides any race, caste, color, creed and nationality" and furthermore states that, "Women must not be portrayed in a manner that emphasizes passive, submissive qualities and encourages them to play a subordinate secondary role in the family and society." The minister told Parliament that if broadcasters do not regulate ad content the government will be forced to do so. The Mumbai-based Advertising Standards Council of India (ASCI), a body of advertisers and media agencies, insisted that it should do the regulating not the government. ASCI had already told Hindustan Lever that its ad campaign was offensive and it was ended.

=== Developing world ===
During the decolonization era from the late 1940s to the 1970s, British and French firms operating in Africa and Asia at first largely ignored local, nationalistic aspirations. However they learned to adjust to exploit the new spirit of independence that was shaping consumer attitudes. The new emergence of a middle class was the target audience. Their advertising abandoned the traditional paternalistic attitude toward the natives. Instead there was a portrayal of locals as up-and-coming middle-class men in control of developing their nations. These more positive images assisted business operations during spells of military dictatorship, economic nationalism, and expropriation of foreign assets. Tobacco advertising was especially important. For example, in Egyptian popular culture the cigar was associated with elites, the water pipe with a lower-class and traditional lifestyle, and the cigarette with the new middle class which was striving to make the transition to modernity. It was the third group that the cigarette industry targeted.

Brazil is the largest country in Latin America, and number five in the world in terms of population. Its economy grew rapidly in the 21st century, until it began to stall in 2010. At that time it was the world's sixth-biggest advertising market, at $US 14.2 billion. Brazil in 2010 ranks #1 in deodorants, #2 in children's products, #3 in cosmetics, and #4 in automobile sales

==== Mexico ====
The start in 1994 of the North American Free Trade Agreement had a dramatic impact on the advertising industry in Mexico, with its 130 full service agencies and 270 smaller operations under the auspisces of the Mexican Association of Advertising Agencies. The flood of American brand-name products greatly expanded the scope of the advertising industry, and the Mexican agencies faced new competition from branch offices of international firms.

A key to the new market was that upscale consumers in Mexico typically display "malinchismo", which is a preference for imported American brands rather than local Mexican brands. As a result, American products are sold mostly to the middle class market, and their advertising agencies generally avoid working class and rural areas. They concentrate their efforts instead on Mexico City, Monterrey, and Guadalajara, which purchase 70 percent of the American imports. Advertising battles in Mexico, include not only issues of quality, but issues of national authenticity. For example, in Mexico in the 1990s, two American exporters Procter & Gamble and Frito-Lay fought an advertising battle concerning whose potato chips are tastier, more natural, and more Mexican. Procter & Gamble challenged Frito-Lay's Sabritas which controls 80 percent of the $1 billion chip market.

== See also ==
- American business history
- History of broadcasting
- History of advertising in Britain
- History of public relations
- Marketing
- Sex in advertising
- Programmatic advertising

=== Agencies ===
- American Association of Advertising Agencies
- FCB (advertising agency), Foote, Cone & Belding
- Interpublic
- Omnicom
  - BBDO
  - DDB Worldwide
  - TBWA Worldwide
- Publicis, Leading international agency based in Paris
  - Leo Burnett Worldwide
- Saatchi & Saatchi
- WPP
  - Ogilvy
  - Taylor Nelson Sofres
  - Young & Rubicam
  - J Walter Thompson

=== Personalities ===
- P. T. Barnum
- Bill Bernbach
- Leo Burnett
- Fairfax M. Cone
- Claude C. Hopkins
- Allan Johnston
- Albert Lasker
- Mary Wells Lawrence
- Alan Morris
- David Ogilvy
- George Patterson
- Charles Saatchi
- Maurice Saatchi
- J. Walter Thompson
