= History of advertising in Britain =

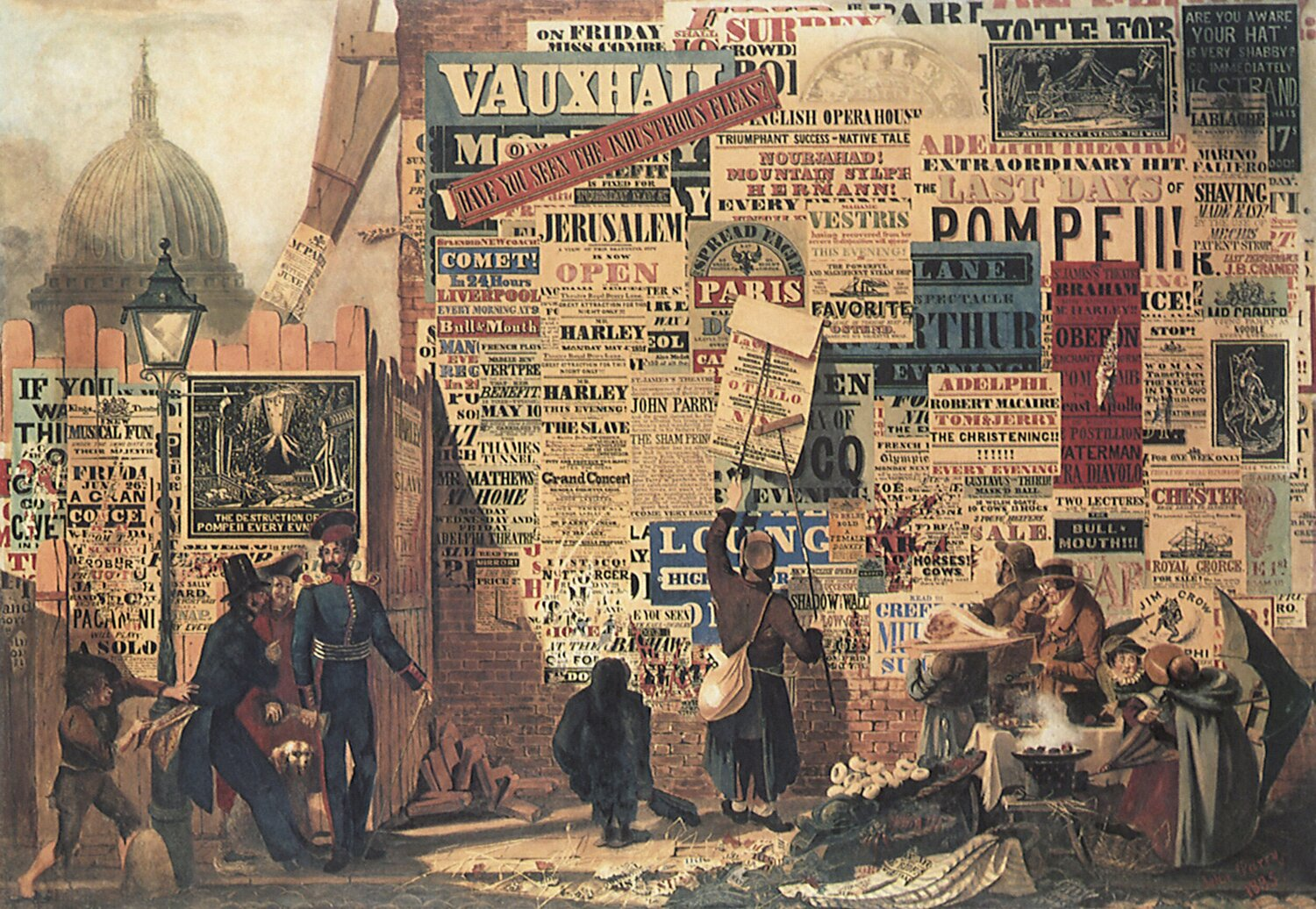
Outdoor advertising was based on hoardings (billboards): England 1835, by John Orlando Parry

The history of advertising in Britain has been a major part of the history of its capitalist economy for three centuries. It became a major force as agencies were organized in the mid-19th century, using primarily newspapers and magazines. In the 20th century, It grew rapidly with new technologies, such as direct mail, radio, television. In the late 19th century, home-based British agencies were swallowed up and became branches of international firms, but London remains one of the world's most important advertising centers. Radical changes have come recently because of the new roles for the Internet and smart phones. For current conditions see Advertising.

== Pioneers ==
=== 18th century ===
The three main forms of advertising in the 18th century were the trade card, posters that were fastened to the side of buildings, and, to a lesser extent, small display advertisements in newspapers.

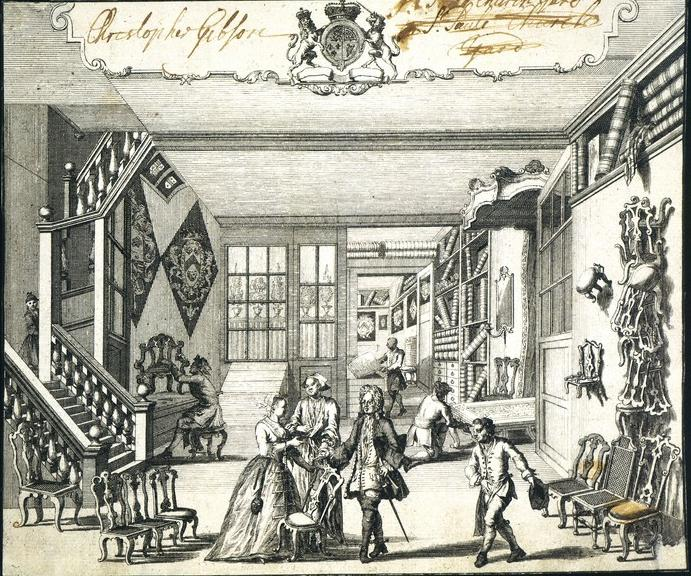
A trade card for chairs, 1730s

A favourite advertising medium was the trade card. It was a small printed illustrated card that shops and tradesmen handed to customers; it described a single product. The hope was they would pass it around to their friends and family.

Newspaper copywriters in Scotland in the mid-18th century were the first to realize the function of the advertisement was not so much to provide information about the seller, but to excite the imagination of the purchaser and the boost the value of owning the particular product. They targeted upscale readers and manipulated the advertisement's language and tone to create a bond of trust linking the manufacturer, the product itself, and the consumers. One popular trope was to applaud Scottish nationalism. Another trope was to appeal to authority by emphasizing products that had the royal seal of approval, or providing written testimony from prominent local physicians and other local notables.

In the 18th century advertisements started to appear in weekly newspapers in England. These early print advertisements were used mainly to promote books and newspapers, which became increasingly affordable with advances in the printing press; and medicines, which were increasingly sought after as disease ravaged Europe. In 18th-century Britain newspaper advertisements were the primary means of publishing accounts of troublesome people and requesting further information about them. Runaway convicts, servants, apprentices, soldiers, and spouses are all described in great detail.

=== 19th century ===
Women became targets in the late Georgian era, as magazine and newspaper ads introduced emphasized beauty products using nationwide product distribution, brand-name marketing, and the targeting of specific audiences. Upscale women were encouraged to move further up through more expensive fashions and cosmetics. Women were flattered to learn that Pears's Liquid Bloom of Roses and White Imperial Powder beautifully tints their cheeks and lips, bestowing a delicacy to the countenance. Men, by contrast, were given an ugly warning in the ad for John Gowland's spot cream, in the Sussex Weekly Advertiser in 1791:

To THE GENTLEMEN: THIS LOTION is an EFFECTUAL REMEDY for all SCORBUTIC and HERPETIC eruptions of the FACE and SKIN, from the most trivial to the most DISFIGURING and INVETERATE; from the smallest PIMPLE or TETTER to the most universally SPREADING Eruptions or Ulcerations. For redness of the NOSE, ARMS, or other part, and in short for every train and species of EVIL to which the Skin is liable, whether vivid and INFLAMED, or LANGUID and OBDURATE.

In the early 19th century, Edinburgh businessman and civic leader Nahum Ward purchased farmlands near Marietta, Ohio on the American frontier and resold them to farmers in Scotland. He advertised heavily in small towns using magazine articles and handbills, extolling the high productivity and low cost of the fresh lands. Throughout the century and into the early 20th century, American, Canadian, Australian and New Zealand railroads and land agents advertised heavily across Britain.

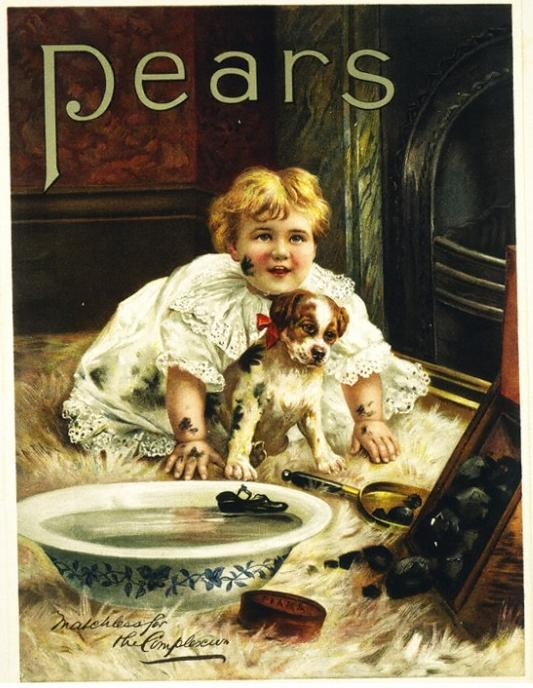
A 1900 British ad for Pears soap

In London in the late 19th century Thomas J. Barratt was hailed as "the father of modern advertising". Working for the Pears Soap company, Barratt created an effective advertising campaign for the company products, which involved the use of targeted slogans, images and phrases. This budget reached £80,000 per year. One of his slogans, "Good morning. Have you used Pears' soap?" was famous in its day and into the 20th century.

An advertising tactic that he used was to associate the Pears brand with high culture and quality. Most famously, he used the painting Bubbles by John Everett Millais as an advertisement by adding a bar of Pears soap into the foreground. (Millais protested at this alteration of his work, but in vain as Barratt had bought the copyright.) Barratt continued this theme with a series of adverts of well groomed middle-class children, associating Pears with domestic comfort and aspirations of modern cleanliness.

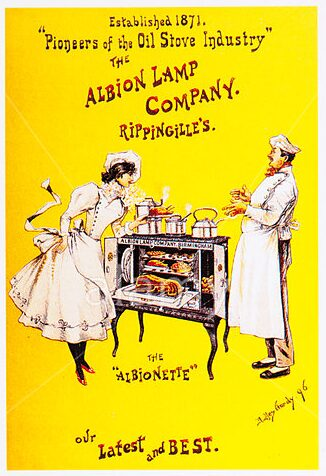
1896 ad by Dudley Hardy

Barratt established Pears Annual in 1891 as a spin-off magazine which promoted contemporary illustration and colour printing and in 1897 added the Pears Cyclopedia a one-volume encyclopedia. From the early 20th century Pears was famous for the annual "Miss Pears" competition in which parents entered their children into the high-profile hunt for a young brand ambassador to be used on packaging and in consumer promotions. He recruited scientists and the celebrities of the day to publicly endorse the product. Lillie Langtry, a British music hall singer and stage actress with a famous ivory complexion, received income as the first woman to endorse a commercial product, advertising Pears Soap. Barratt introduced many of the crucial ideas that lie behind successful advertising and these were widely circulated in his day. He constantly stressed the importance of a strong and exclusive brand image for Pears and of emphasizing the product's availability through saturation campaigns. He also understood the importance of constantly reevaluating the market for changing tastes and mores, stating in 1907 that "tastes change, fashions change, and the advertiser has to change with them. An idea that was effective a generation ago would fall flat, stale, and unprofitable if presented to the public today. Not that the idea of today is always better than the older idea, but it is different – it hits the present taste."

== 20th century ==
=== Environmentalism ===
A sensibility for the environment became a mainstream feature of advertising after 1970, but Shell Oil was a pioneer in the 1930s. Its advertising seldom visualized Shell's petrol or oil, let alone its drilling rigs, refineries or ocean tankers. Instead its artists were called on to depict bucolic country scenes, rural townscapes, and historic structures. Greenwashing is when a company or organization spends more time and money on marketing themselves as environmentally friendly than on minimizing their environmental impact. It is a deceitful advertising gimmick intended to mislead consumers who prefer to buy goods and services from environmentally conscious brands.

=== Second World War ===
Thomas Lipton (1848-1931) engaged in extensive advertising for his chain of grocery stores and his brand of Lipton teas. He boasted that his secret for success was selling the best goods at the cheapest prices, harnessing the power of advertising, and always being optimistic.

As millions of American soldiers passed through Britain during the Second World War, there were fears of an "Americanization" of British commerce and culture. The Marshall Plan explicitly required and upgrading of the marketing and organizational skills of British industry. There were fears among the leaders of the London advertising world of what the brash, rich Americans would do to them. Radio and television was off limits to advertising, because BBC relied on fees paid by owners of radio receivers. The question was whether the heavily funded American methods would prove irresistible. JWT London was an American owned advertising agency controlled by J. Walter Thompson in New York City. JWT London avoided being the bold apostle of the American style. Instead it relied on soft persuasion, shedding its Americanness to adapt to the British understated style.

=== Tobacco ===
By the 1950s, fears of cancer from tobacco smoking cause consternation in the tobacco industry, which turned to advertisers for help in avoiding falling consumer demand and increased regulation. British and American agencies separately arrived at similar solutions. The Tobacco Manufacturers' Standing Committee in Britain assuaged public anxieties and encouraged the misperception that the cigarette makers were resolving the issues through filters and low tar formulations. The public relations approach was successful in the short run, but the accumulation of medical evidence led to a fall in smoking, heavier taxation, and increased regulation. The agencies responded with sophisticated advertising strategies designed to encourage adolescent smokers as well as to recruit new smokers in less-developed foreign markets. Government anti-smoking programs were developed that used standard advertising techniques to degrade the prestige of cigarette smoking and warn of its dangers.

=== American rivals ===
New York agencies opened branches in London primarily to serve American-based multinational clients, such as General Motors and General Electric. Their much deeper financial base allowed them to grow rapidly from 1945 until the late 1970s, by which time they dominated the top end of the British advertising market. The British staged a major counter-challenge in the early 1980s, however, with considerable success, thanks to their improved access to capital. The British firms expanded through acquisition of American agencies, rather than the servicing of British-based multinational companies. Artistically, the critical moment came in the 1960s as Americans approaches impacted the British agencies. Britons were already deep into experimentation in music, fashion, photography, and graphic design, so they snatched at the American models of advertising. The first D&AD (Design and Art Direction) awards came in 1963, and helped define the standards of excellence. The trade magazine Campaign launched in 1968. "What happened in New York led to what is now regarded as the golden age of British advertising," said Alfredo Marcantonio."

== Notorious advertising campaigns ==
=== Cadbury flake ===
The Cadbury Flake chocolate was advertised on television from the 1960s. It has always shown an attractive female, often semi-clad, consuming the chocolate bar product, largely and obviously redolent of performing a sexual act.

=== Tango canned drinks ===
Tango (drink) had notorious television and radio adverts throughout the 1990s, from around 1993. The adverts revolved around bizarre psychological effects, or crazes, arising from people's inner needs to drink the Tango canned drink.

=== Pot Noodle ===
Pot Noodle, an instant noodle product, made by Unilever, has had controversial television advertising from the 1990s, with some in bad taste.

== See also ==
- Advertising campaign
- Advertising Standards Authority (United Kingdom)
- Campaign (magazine), Based in London
- D&AD, Design and Art Direction awards
- History of advertising, Global coverage
- History of Advertising Trust
- Museum of Brands, Packaging and Advertising

=== Agencies ===
- Bartle Bogle Hegarty
- Crawford's Advertising Agency
- DDB Worldwide
- FCB (advertising agency)
- HHCL
- J. Walter Thompson
- Mullen Lowe Group
- Ogilvy & Mather
- WPP plc

== Notes ==
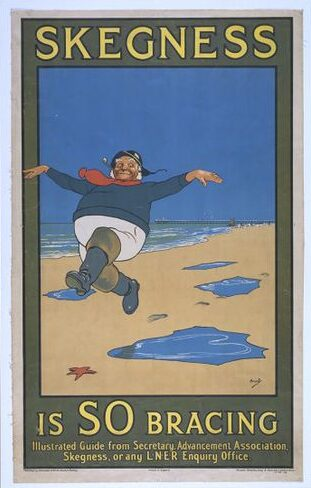
Travel poster by John Hassall, 1908
