= Napoli Eden =

- Directed by: Bruno Colella
- Music by: Eugenio Bennato
- Production company: Annydi Productions
- Release date: 24 June 2020
- Running time: 74 minutes
- Country: Italy

Napoli Eden is a 2020 documentary film about the artist Annalaura di Luggo directed by Bruno Colella, produced by Annydi Productions with music by Eugenio Bennato and photography by Blasco Giurato. The creative consultant is Stanley Isaacs and the marketing consultant is Greg Ferris.

Napoli Eden has passed the admission selection to the 93rd Academy Awards and is in consideration as best documentary feature.

== Synopsis ==
Napoli Eden captures the creative journey of the artist Annalaura di Luggo when she decided to build four monumental works of art out of recycled aluminum and position them in symbolic places in the city of Naples.

Annalaura di Luggo also recruited some "at-risk-kids" from the Spanish Quarters of Naples in an attempt to stimulate their lives with new positive and creative possibilities in "a journey towards the light".

The project highlights environmental protection through the theme of transforming recycled aluminum into works of art and conveys a vision of redemption, social inclusion, ethical and cultural rebirth.

== Release ==
Napoli Eden had its world premiere in Rome on June 24, 2020 at Adriano Studios Cinemas.

The Municipality of Milan selected Napoli Eden for "I Talenti delle donne" with a special screening on September 17 at the Anteo Citylife.

In November, the documentary was released in the United States, and it was first shown in Miami (at CMX Cinemas Brickell Center) from November 13 to 19 2020.

== Qualifications ==
- 2020, Impact DOCS Awards California, best documentary and best impact (motivating / inspiring);
- 2020, Hollywood Gold Awards, Best documentary;
- 2020, L’Age d’or International Arthouse Film Festival, best documentary, best actress and best director;
- 2020, Venice Film Awards, best documentary;
- 2020, Social World Film Festival, special mention by the critical jury to Annalaura di Luggo.

Napoli Eden was selected by the Ministry of Foreign Affairs (Italy) as part of the "Project for the Promotion of the Country of Italy in the World".
