= 2021 Academy Awards =

2021 Academy Awards may refer to:

- 93rd Academy Awards, the Academy Awards Ceremony that took place April 25, 2021, honoring the best in film for January 2020 through February 2021
- 94th Academy Awards, the Academy Awards Ceremony that took place March 27, 2022
