= Fanucci Editore =

Italian publishing house

Fanucci Editore is an Italian publishing house, based in Rome, Italy, founded in July 1971, by Renato Fanucci. It publishes mainly science fiction, horror and fantasy. It has published the Italian editions of Philip K. Dick books for whom owns the exclusive rights for Italy.
