= Filiberto Menna =

Italian art historian (1926-1989)

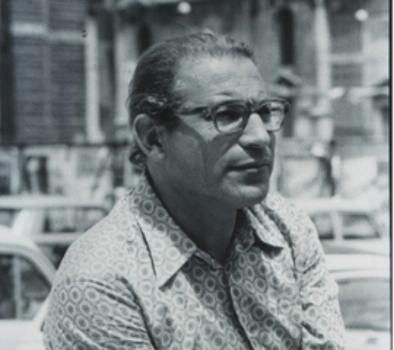
- Born: 11 November 1926; Salerno, Italy
- Died: 6 February 1989 (aged 62); Rome, Italy
- Occupation: Art historian

Filiberto Menna (11 November 1926 – 6 February 1989) was an Italian art critic, curator, theorist, historian, and academic.

== Life and career ==
Menna was born in Salerno in 1926. His father, Alfonso Menna, was a politician associated with the Christian Democracy party. In 1950 Menna graduated in medicine at the University of Naples Federico II. While working as a doctor, he developed an interest in fine arts and in 1957 he made his literary debut with the critical essay Masaccio a Roma ('Masaccio in Rome'), published by La Fiera Letteraria. In 1959, he married the poet Bianca Pucciarelli, known under the pen name Tomaso Binga. In 1965, he quit his job as a doctor following his appointment as Professor of History of Art at the University of Salerno. In 1969 he was nominated Director of History of Art Institute within the university. In 1979, he became ordinary professor at the Sapienza University of Rome.

Menna's principal area of interest was on abstractism and avant-gardes. Among his major works are Industrial design: Inchiesta… (Industrial Design: A Survey, 1962), in which he theorized the potential integration of industrial production with art; Profezia di una società estetica ('Prophecy of an Aesthetic Society', 1968), a study about the roots of avant-gardes and modern art; La linea analitica dell’arte moderna ('The Analytical Strain in Modern Art', 1975), a history of art from a structuralist and analytical perspective which investigated the connections between art, mathematic and logic; Critica della critica ('Critique of Criticism', 1980); and Progetto moderno dell’arte ('Modern Project of Art', 1988). He also authored monographies on the work of Piet Mondrian, Enrico Prampolini, and William Hogarth.

Menna collaborated with numerous publications, including the newspapers Il Mattino and Paese Sera. In 1982 he founded and edited the art journal Figure: Teoria e Critica dell'Arte. As an art curator, he collaborated with the Venice Biennale and the Rome Quadriennale. In 1975 he served as a Campania Regional Councilor, after being elected as an independent with the Italian Communist Party.

Menna died of leukemia on 6 February 1989, at the age of 62.
