= 2022 Academy Awards =

2022 Academy Awards may refer to:

- 94th Academy Awards, the Academy Awards ceremony that took place in 2022, honoring the best in film for March 2021 through December 2021
- 95th Academy Awards, the Academy Awards ceremony that took place in 2023, honoring the best in film for 2022
