= Armando Testa =

Italian graphic designer, cartoonist, animator and painter (1917–1992)

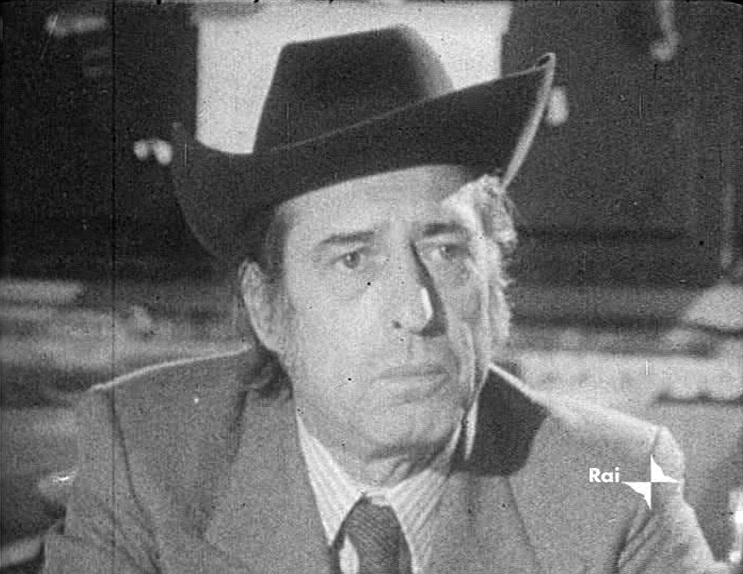
- Armando Testa in 1971
- Born: March 23, 1917; Turin, Italy
- Died: March 20, 1992 (aged 74)
- Education: Vigliardi-Paravia Printing School
- Occupations: Graphic design, illustration, animation, painting
- Notable work: Official logo for the 1960 Summer Olympics
- Awards: Gold Medal of the Ministry of Education for Visual Art (1968)

Armando Testa (23 March 1917 – 20 March 1992) was an Italian graphic designer, cartoonist, animator and painter.

Born in Turin, Testa worked as a typesetter until 20 years old. He was initiated to artistic career by abstract painter Ezio D'Errico, who was one of his professors at the Vigliardi-Paravia Printing School he attended. After winning a poster design contest in 1937, he started working in the advertising industry, and in 1946 abandoned his work as a printer and opened a graphic studio in his hometown. In 1956, he founded Studio Armando Testa along with his wife, Lidia, and associate Franco de Barberis, and their studio soon became one of Italy's largest agencies, partnering with Benton & Bowles in the United States and establishing several branches throughout Europe. A key role in Testa's success had television commercials, particularly the ones created for Carosello. In 1959 he created the official logo for 1960 Summer Olympics. Studio Armando Testa's customers include Nestlé, Lavazza and Barilla.

Between 1965 and 1971, he was a professor of Design and Typographic Composition at the Polytechnic University of Turin.

He was granted the Gold Medal of the Ministry of Education for his contribution to Visual Art in 1968.

Starting from the mid-1980s, Testa focused on painting and poster design for cultural and social campaigns. In 1985 he was appointed honor laureate in Fort Collins, Colorado.

At the 66th edition of the Venice Film Festival, in September 2009, biographical documentary film Armando Testa. Povero ma moderno, directed by Pappi Corsicato, was presented out of competition.

== See also ==
- History of advertising § Italy
