= Fanucci =

Fanucci is an Italian surname. Notable people with the surname include:

- Mike Fanucci (born 1949), American football player
- Stefano Fanucci (born 1979), Italian footballer

== Fictional characters ==
- Don Fanucci, a character in The Godfather
