= 2026 Academy Awards =

2026 Academy Awards may refer to:

- 98th Academy Awards, the Academy Awards ceremony that took place in 2026, honoring the best in film for 2025
- 99th Academy Awards, the Academy Awards ceremony will take place in 2027, honoring the best in film for 2026
