= Lillie (TV series) =

1978 British TV series

- DVD cover art
- Starring: Francesca Annis; Anton Rodgers; Denis Lill; Peter Egan
- Music by: Joseph Horovitz
- Country of origin: United Kingdom
- Original language: English
- No. of series: 1
- No. of episodes: 13

Production
- Executive producer: Tony Wharmby
- Producer: Jack Williams
- Running time: 50 minutes
- Production company: LWT

Original release
- Network: ITV
- Release: 24 September – 17 December 1978

Lillie is a British television series made by London Weekend Television for ITV and broadcast from 24 September to 17 December 1978. The thirteen one-hour episodes were run on PBS Masterpiece Theater beginning in March 1979.

This period serial stars Francesca Annis in the title role of Lillie Langtry. She had played the same character in the 1975 ATV series Edward the Seventh and many of its writers and directors helped to create this one.

Other actors featured include Anton Rodgers as Edward Langtry, Peter Egan as Oscar Wilde, Brian Deacon as Frank Miles, Jennie Linden as Patsy Cornwallis-West, Don Fellows as James Whistler, David Gwillim as Arthur Jones and Annette Crosbie as Henrietta Labouchere. Denis Lill played Bertie, the Prince of Wales (later Edward VII). He had played Frederick Ponsonby to Timothy West's Edward in the Edward the Seventh series.

Annis won the BAFTA Television Award for Best Actress for the role in 1979.

The series has a total of 13 episodes. It is available on DVD in both the UK and North American markets, and has also been repeated on UKTV Drama.

== Cast ==
- Francesca Annis as Lillie Langtry
- Anton Rodgers as Edward Langtry
- Denis Lill as the Prince of Wales
- Peter Egan as Oscar Wilde
- Patrick Holt as Dean Le Breton
- Peggy Ann Wood as Mrs Le Breton
- Anthony Head as William Le Breton
- John Castle as Prince Louis of Battenberg
- Simon Fisher-Turner as Reggie Le Breton
- Adam Bareham as Clement Le Breton
- Joanna David as Jeanne Marie Langtry Malcolm
- David Rintoul as Lieutenant Charles Longley
- David Gwillim as Arthur Jones
- Catherine Feller as Dominique
- Jennie Linden as Patsy Cornwallis-West
- Bruce Boa as Joaquin Miller
- Brian Deacon as Frank Miles
- Don Fellows as James Abbott McNeill Whistler
- Basil Hoskins as John Millais
- Sheila Reid as Queen Victoria
- Patrick Ryecart as Crown Prince Rudolf
- Cheryl Campbell as Sarah Bernhardt
- Annette Crosbie as Henrietta Labouchere
- Nicholas Jones as Squire Abingdon
- Tommy Duggan as Judge Roy Bean

== Episodes ==
No. overall	No. in series	Title	Directed by	Written by	Original release date
1	1	"Emillie"	John Gorrie	David Butler	24 September 1978
On the island of Jersey, Emillie Charlotte Le Breton grows up as one of the boys with her brothers (including their education), unconsciously breaking hearts as early as 1863, when she is only 15. Her happy childhood ends when her mother takes her to London for a week to show her what is expected of her as a woman. Her father, the dean of the local church, forbids her to go on seeing a local boy. Her brother tells her the real reason is that the boy, Michel, is their father’s son by another woman and their half-brother. The wealthy ship owner and widower Edward Langtry seems her best option for escape from the island, so Lillie marries him, becoming Lillie Langtry.
2	2	"Mrs Langtry"	John Gorrie	David Butler	1 October 1978
Lillie quickly discovers that her new husband expects her to be quiet, pretty, complaisant, and very much a lady. Terrified of being left isolated and lonely in their large Southampton house, she convinces him to take her with him in competition, ending with a visit to Jersey. There, she discovers that Langtry's apparent wealth has been overwhelmed by debt and all he has left is a small allowance, necessitating the sale of his yachts. After surviving a bout of typhoid, she pleads with her doctor, who is entranced by her, to convince Langtry that full recovery, as well as the health of the marriage, require a move to London. The death of her brother Reggie in a riding accident provides an excuse to stick to a single black dress for public appearances. An invitation from an old Jersey acquaintance leads to her first dinner party, where she meets the writer Oscar Wilde and the artists John Millais, Frank Miles, and James Whistler, all of whom want to take her likeness.
3	3	"The Jersey Lily"	John Gorrie	David Butler	8 October 1978
The appearance of copies of Frank Miles' sketch in shops announce Lillie's arrival as a 'professional beauty' and she is much in demand in artists’ studios and at social occasions, accompanied by her increasingly irrelevant husband. Lillie is befriended by the likes of Patsy Cornwallis-West, meets Oscar Wilde and Queen Victoria’s daughter Princess Louise, and becomes a social sensation.
4	4	"The New Helen"	Christopher Hodson	David Butler	15 October 1978
King Leopold of Belgium, whom Lillie has met at a reception, begins to pay her personal attention. Despite the possible social consequences for herself and the increasingly often inebriated Edward, she declines to continue the relationship. While she enjoys the company of other conquests, Oscar Wilde lets her in on what everyone else knows: she's under consideration for a much better offer.
5	5	"Bertie"	John Gorrie	David Butler	22 October 1978
Lillie begins planning for the end of the season, when she imagines she will be left alone with Edward for the rest of her life. While the thought of a life in Jersey with the enamoured Arthur Jones has its appeal, the Prince of Wales has other ideas, which require her to remain married to Edward.
6	6	"Let Them Say"	Christopher Hodson	David Butler	29 October 1978
Crown Prince Rudolf of Austria visits London and is much taken with Lillie, suggesting that with the Prince of Wales out of town it is expected that she is available for loan. Furious, the Prince takes her publicly under his protection and determines that she shall be presented at court. Lillie befriends the actress Sarah Bernhardt when Bertie's attentions begin to shift in that direction. James Whistler leaves town after being bankrupted by winning a libel suit. Reckless after losing her relationship with former neighbour Arthur Jones, Lillie publicly oversteps the bounds of her relationship with the Prince.
7	7	"The Sailor Prince"	Christopher Hodson	John Gorrie	5 November 1978
The doors closing to Lillie reopen when the Prince publicly appreciates her appearance in a tableau vivant for John Millais. Trouble awaits in the form of newspaper stories that Edward Langtry has filed for divorce and has named the Prince as a co-respondent. Meanwhile, they are nearly out of money because Edward's Irish tenants are refusing to pay rents. When Lillie thinks of marrying Prince Louis of Battenberg, Bertie forbids it. Lillie encounters a problem in her new plan to become an actress.
8	8	"Going on the Stage"	Tony Wharmby	John Gorrie	12 November 1978
Lillie, by now out of money, closes up her London house and with the help of Arthur Jones moves back to Jersey, where the Prince arranges to loan her £2,000 so she can finish her pregnancy in Paris, where she gives birth to a daughter, Jeanne Marie, whom she tells the world is her niece. With permanently drunk Edward refusing her a divorce, she returns to London to become an actress, aided by actress and teacher Henrietta Labouchere. Early successes lead to an American tour.
9	9	"America!"	John Gorrie	John Gorrie	19 November 1978
Lillie's American tour is a popular success but a critical failure, which does not surprise the increasingly resentful and frustrated Henrietta. More successful is Lillie’s new relationship with the wealthy New Yorker Freddy Gebhard, who tells her she can get a divorce by becoming an American citizen.
10	10	"Home on the Range"	Tony Wharmby	David Butler	26 November 1978
The Prince's latest passion, gambling, becomes a London society craze. On her latest American tour, Lillie finds herself in competition, then in cahoots, with the American actress Lillian Russell. After her father's death, Lillie brings Jeanne Marie and her mother to join her in the US. Freddy issues an ultimatum. Delayed by a bout of measles followed by pneumonia, Lillie tries to recoup her losses on a ranch venture by returning to the stage, but falls out with Oscar Wilde when he writes Lady Windermere's Fan for her and inserts too much truth. She falls in with the wealthy racehorse owner and amateur jockey George Baird, the squire of Abingdon.
11	11	"Mr Jersey"	John Gorrie	David Butler	3 December 1978
Lillie's relationship with the abusive and bullying Baird costs her friends, her career, and many of her long-time servants though it is financially lucrative. After two years' silence, she reconciles with Oscar Wilde. At the Prince's behest, she does not press charges when one of Baird's beatings nearly kills her. When his death leaves her without the inheritance she expected, she races the horses he chose for her under the name Mr Jersey. Riding high on the success of The Importance of Being Earnest, Oscar Wilde is arrested on charges of sodomy and gross indecency. Jeanne Marie discovers Lillie's identity as her mother, and Lillie finally secures a divorce.
12	12	"Sunset and Evening Star"	Tony Wharmby	David Butler	10 December 1978
Edward Langtry's death has Lillie branded a heartless adventuress in the newspapers. Jeanne Marie is introduced to royalty. Lillie goes back on the stage, auctions her yacht, and opens her own theatre to recoup losses after half her fortune disappears when the safe deposit box containing her jewellery is stolen from the bank. She and her new husband Hugo de Bathe spend an increasing amount of time apart. Jeanne gets married and finally learns the whole truth about herself.
13	13	"Fifty Cents a Dance"	John Gorrie	John Gorrie	17 December 1978
Bertie bequeaths Lillie his dog. While World War I breaks out, Lillie tours America, makes a short silent film, and gets into a fight in a dance hall. Lillie's brother Clem and Louis Battenberg try to convince Jeanne Marie to forgive her mother; her son, Victor, finally succeeds. Lillie ends her days living in Monaco.
