= Lillie Langtry Stakes =

Flat horse race in Britain

- Class: Group 2
- Location: Goodwood Racecourse; W. Sussex, England
- Inaugurated: 2003 (as Gladness Stakes)
- Race type: Flat / Thoroughbred
- Sponsor: Qatar
- Website: Goodwood

Race information
- Distance: 1m 6f (2,816 metres)
- Surface: Turf
- Track: Right-handed
- Qualification: Three-years-old and up fillies & mares
- Weight: 8 st 13 lb (3yo); 9 st 3 lb (4yo+); Penalties; 5 lb for Group 1 winners * 3 lb for Group 2 winners * * after 2024
- Purse: £300,000 (2025); 1st: £170,130

Lillie Langtry Stakes
2026
Goodie Two Shoes	Santorini Star	Waardah

Previous years
2025
Waardah	Danielle	Goodie Two Shoes
2024
Term Of Endearment	Night Sparkle	River Of Stars
2023
Sumo Sam	River Of Stars	Time Lock
2022
Sea La Rosa	Urban Artist	Emily Dickinson
2021
Wonderful Tonight	Tribal Craft	Albaflora

2020-2011
2020
Enbihaar	Cabaletta	Snow
2019
Enbihaar	Manuela De Vega	South Sea Pearl
2018
Pilaster	Maid Up	Star Rock
2017
Endless Time	Dubka	Melodic Motion
2016
California	Tioga Pass	Twitch
2015
Simple Verse	Hidden Gold	Jordan Princess
2014
Missunited	Arabian Comet	Waila
2013
Wild Coco	Elik	Alta Lilea
2012
Wild Coco	Jehannedarc	Estimate
2011
Meeznah	Shankardeh	Motrice

2010-2003
2010
Eastern Aria	Polly's Mark	Motrice
2009
Sevenna	Cassique Lady	Victoria Montoya
2008
Gravitation	Folk Opera	Miracle Seeker
2007
Hi Calypso	Wannabe Posh	Trick Or Treat
2006
Tartouche	Art Eyes	Sirce
2005
Tartouche	Without A Trace	Astrocharm
2004
Astrocharm	Pongee	Summitville
2003
Moments of Joy	Discreet Brief	Prompt Payment

The Lillie Langtry Stakes is a Group 2 flat horse race in Great Britain open to fillies and mares aged three years or older. It is run at Goodwood over a distance of 1 mile and 6 furlongs (2,816 metres), and it is scheduled to take place each year in late July or early August.

== History ==
The event was established in 2003, and it was initially titled the Gladness Stakes. It was named after Gladness, a successful racehorse whose victories included the Goodwood Cup in 1958. The inaugural running was classed at Listed level.

The race was renamed and promoted to Group 3 status in 2004. It was named after Lillie Langtry, a British actress who was a mistress of King Edward VII. Langtry owned the Australian-bred Merman, the winner of the Goodwood Cup in 1899 and Ascot Gold Cup in 1900. As a woman she was not allowed to register the horse under her own name and used the pseudonym Mr Jersey, a reference to her place of birth. In 1907 Langtry became Lady de Bathe when her husband succeeded to the baronetcy following the death of his father. The race was upgraded again to Group 2 status from the 2018 running.

The Lillie Langtry Stakes was sponsored by Moët Hennessy from 2008 to 2010, and during this period it was known as the Moët Hennessy Fillies' Stakes. It was sponsored by BlackRock and run as the iShares Fillies' Stakes in 2011-12. In 2013 it was renamed the Blackrock Fillies' Stakes, and in 2014 it was sponsored by Sterling Insurance. From 2015 to 2017 the race was sponsored by Markel Insurance.

The race is currently held on the final day of the five-day Glorious Goodwood meeting.

== Records ==
Most successful horse (2 wins):

- Tartouche – 2005, 2006
- Wild Coco - 2012, 2013
- Enbihaar - 2019, 2020

Leading jockey (3 wins):

- Seb Sanders – Moments of Joy (2003), Tartouche (2005, 2006)
- Tom Queally - Sevenna (2009), Wild Coco (2012, 2013)
- Jim Crowley - Missunited (2014), Enbihaar (2019, 2020)

Leading trainer (3 wins):

- John Gosden - California (2016), Enbihaar (2019,2020)

== Winners ==
Year	Winner	Age	Jockey	Trainer	Time
2003	Moments of Joy	3	Seb Sanders	Rae Guest	3:02.77
2004	Astrocharm	5	Neil Callan	Mark Tompkins	3:00.27
2005	Tartouche	4	Seb Sanders	Lady Herries	3:07.81
2006	Tartouche	5	Seb Sanders	Lady Herries	3:00.70
2007	Hi Calypso	3	Ryan Moore	Sir Michael Stoute	3:02.47
2008	Gravitation	3	Alan Munro	William Jarvis	3:04.67
2009	Sevenna	4	Tom Queally	Henry Cecil	3:06.55
2010	Eastern Aria	4	Richard Hills	Mark Johnston	2:58.05
2011	Meeznah	4	Frankie Dettori	David Lanigan	2:57.61
2012	Wild Coco	4	Tom Queally	Sir Henry Cecil	3:03.39
2013	Wild Coco	5	Tom Queally	Lady Cecil	2:59.00
2014	Missunited	7	Jim Crowley	Michael Winters	2:59.27
2015	Simple Verse	3	Harry Bentley	Ralph Beckett	3:00.79
2016	California	4	Robert Havlin	John Gosden	3:03.71
2017	Endless Time	5	William Buick	Charlie Appleby	3:14.11
2018	Pilaster	3	David Egan	Roger Varian	2:59.16
2019	Enbihaar	4	Jim Crowley	John Gosden	2:58.69
2020	Enbihaar	5	Jim Crowley	John Gosden	3:03.42
2021	Wonderful Tonight	4	William Buick	David Menuisier	3:13.05
2022	Sea La Rosa	4	Tom Marquand	William Haggas	3:00.58
2023	Sumo Sam	3	Tom Marquand	Paul & Oliver Cole	3:17.66
2024	Term Of Endearment	5	Billy Lee	Henry de Bromhead	3:02.91
2025	Waardah	3	Callum Rodriguez	Owen Burrows	3:04.08
2026	Goodie Two Shoes	7	Dylan Browne McMonagle	Joseph O'Brien	3:00.31

== See also ==
- Horse racing in Great Britain
- List of British flat horse races
