= Lillie Langtry =

British socialite, actress, and theatrical producer (1853–1929)

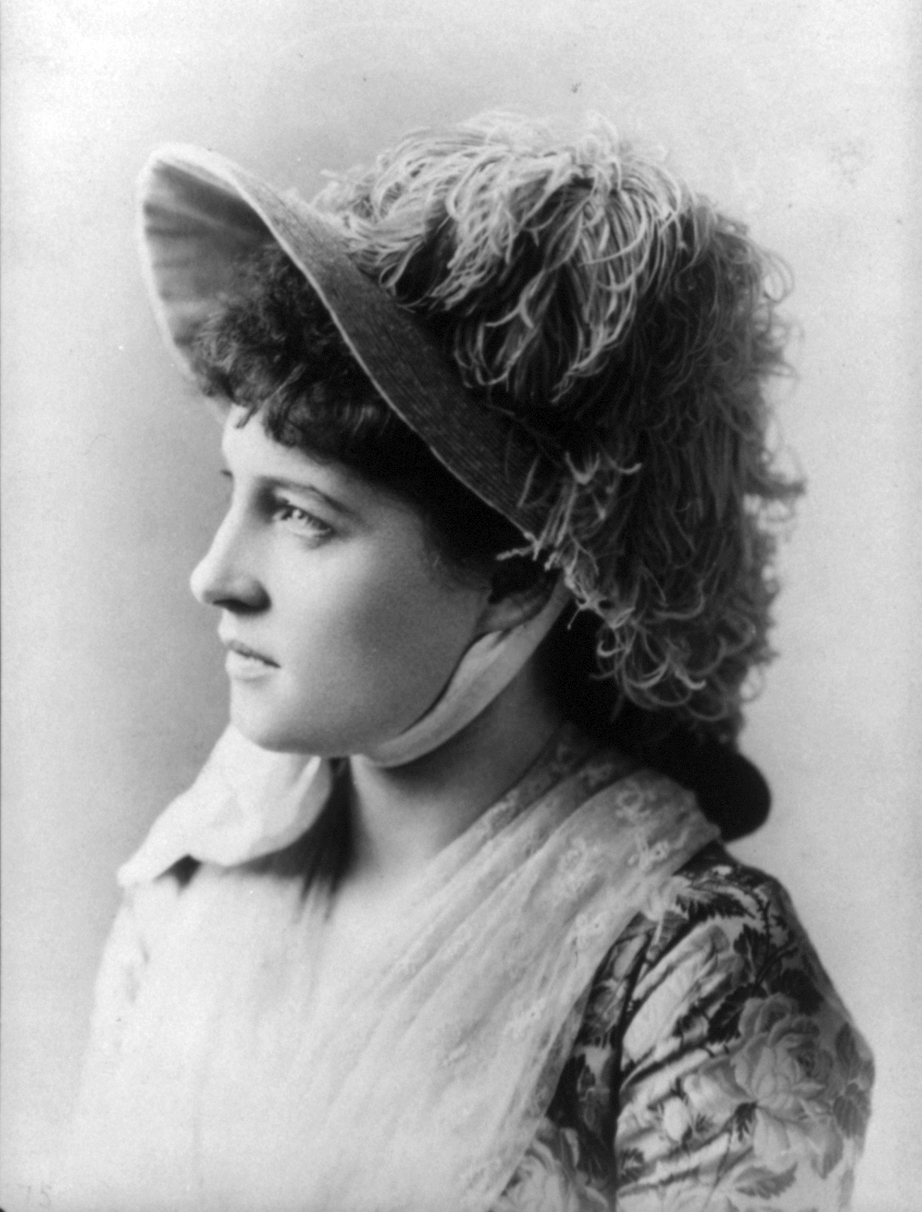
- Langtry in 1882
- Born: Emilie Charlotte Le Breton; 13 October 1853; Saint Saviour, Jersey
- Died: 12 February 1929 (aged 75); Monte Carlo, Monaco
- Occupation: Actress
- Spouses: Edward Langtry (m. 1874; div. 1897) Sir Hugo de Bathe, 5th Baronet (m. 1899)
- Children: Jeanne Marie Langtry

Signature
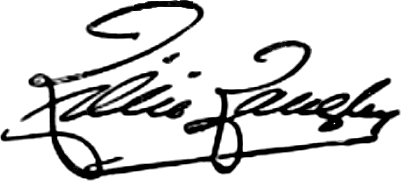

Emilie Charlotte, Lady de Bathe (née Le Breton, formerly Langtry; 13 October 1853 – 12 February 1929), known as Lillie (or Lily) Langtry and nicknamed "The Jersey Lily," was a British socialite, stage actress and producer.

Born and raised on the island of Jersey, she moved to London in 1876, two years after marrying. Her looks and personality attracted interest, commentary, and invitations from artists and society hostesses, and she was celebrated as a young woman of great beauty and charm. During the aesthetic movement in England, she was painted by aesthete artists. In 1882, she became the poster-girl for Pears soap, and thus the first celebrity to endorse a commercial product.

In 1881, Langtry became an actress and made her West End debut in the comedy She Stoops to Conquer, causing a sensation in London by becoming the first socialite to appear on stage. She starred in many plays in both the United Kingdom and the United States, including The Lady of Lyons, and Shakespeare's As You Like It. Eventually she ran her own stage production company. In later life she performed "dramatic sketches" in vaudeville. From the mid-1890s until 1919, Langtry lived at Regal Lodge at Newmarket in Suffolk, England, where she maintained a successful horse racing stable. The Lillie Langtry Stakes horse race is named after her.

Considered one of the most glamorous British women of her era, Langtry was the subject of widespread public and media interest. Her acquaintances in London included Oscar Wilde, who encouraged Langtry to pursue acting. She was known for her relationships with royal figures and noblemen, including Albert Edward, Prince of Wales (the future King Edward VII), Lord Shrewsbury, and Prince Louis of Battenberg.

Langtry remains a somewhat enigmatic personality despite having lived a public life as a ‘professional beauty’, royal mistress, actress, and racehorse owner. Opinions about her are contradictory. To some, she was simply calculating and cold-hearted, while to others she appeared charming and open.

== Early life ==
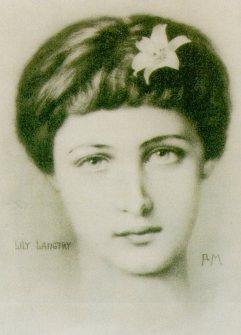
Portrait of Langtry by Frank Miles, before 1891

Born in 1853 and known as Lillie from childhood, Emilie was the daughter of the Very Reverend William Corbet Le Breton and his wife Emilie Davis (née Martin). Lillie's parents had eloped to Gretna Green in Scotland, and, in 1842, married at St Luke's Church, Chelsea, London. The couple had lived in Southwark, London, before William was offered the post of rector and Dean of Jersey. Lillie was born at the Old Rectory, St Saviour, on Jersey, and was baptised in St Saviour on 9 November 1853.

Lillie was the sixth of seven children and the only girl. Her brothers were Francis Corbet Le Breton (1843–1872), William Inglis Le Breton (1846–1924), Trevor Alexander Le Breton (1847–1870), Maurice Vavasour Le Breton (1849–1881), Clement Martin Le Breton (10 January 1851 – 1 July 1927), and Reginald Le Breton (1855–1876). Purportedly, one of their ancestors was Richard le Breton, allegedly one of the assassins in 1170 of Thomas Becket.

In an 1882 interview Lillie said: 'Yes, I was born and educated in Jersey, but it is not correct for you to say that I spent my bread-and-butter days there. I never had any bread-and-butter days. As the only sister of six stout brothers I shared their outdoor sports in a most boyish fashion. It would be more accurate to describe my girlhood as my "tomboy days," I think.'

Lillie's French governess was reputed to have been unable to manage her, so Lillie was educated by her brothers' tutor. This education was of a broader and more solid nature than that typically given to girls at that time. Although their father held the respectable position of Dean of Jersey, he earned an unsavoury reputation as a philanderer, and fathered illegitimate (or natural) children by various of his parishioners. When his wife Emilie finally left him in 1880, he left Jersey.

=== Life in London ===
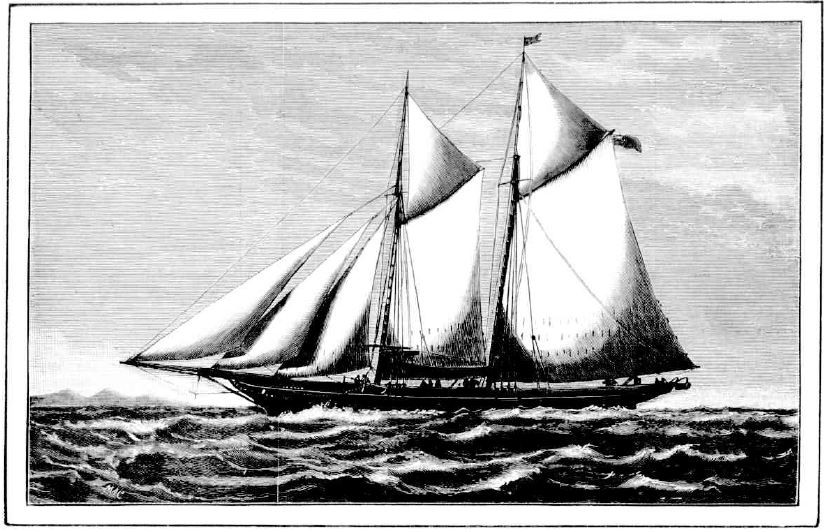
The yacht Red Gauntlet, owned by Edward Langtry, Lillie's husband.

On 9 March 1874, 20-year-old Lillie married 26-year-old Edward ‘Ned’ Langtry (1847–1897), a landowner from Ulster in the north of Ireland. Langtry was the widower of Jane Frances Price, whose sister, Elizabeth Ann Price, was the wife of Lillie's brother William. Lillie and Edward held their wedding reception at The Royal Yacht Hotel in St Helier, Jersey. Ned Langtry owned a large sailing yacht called Red Gauntlet, and Lillie insisted that he take her away from the Channel Islands. In 1876 they rented an apartment in Eaton Place, Belgravia, London.

In 1877, Lillie's brother Clement married Alice, an illegitimate daughter of Viscount Ranelagh, their father's friend. After meeting her in London, Ranelagh invited her to a reception attended by several notable artists at the home of Sir John and Lady Sebright on 29 April 1877. Here she attracted attention for her beauty and wit. Langtry was in mourning for her youngest brother, who had been killed in a riding accident, so in contrast to the elaborate clothes of most women in attendance, she wore a simple black dress (which was to become her trademark) and no jewellery. Before the end of the evening, Frank Miles had completed several sketches of her that became very popular on postcards. Lady Sebrights' salon, where artistic and aristocratic audiences overlapped, was 'the ideal springboard' for Langtry. This company was 'always on the outlook for new diversion, new sensations and new faces'.

In an 1882 interview, Langtry told how "[my] life in Jersey had been spent almost entirely in the open air, and as Mr Langtry was fond of yachting I became an expert yachtswoman and was very fond of all sorts of outdoor exercise, but I longed to see something more of the world." She would later remember Miles as one of her "most enthusiastic" friends, who first saw her at a theatre then asked around about the unknown "beauty". After learning Lillie's identity, Miles "begged [her] to sit for a portrait." The painting made then was purchased by Prince Leopold, and Lillie became famous and popular among the nobles of London and the royal family.

Another guest, Sir John Everett Millais, also a Jersey native, eventually painted her portrait, titling it A Jersey Lily after the Jersey lily flower (Amaryllis belladonna), a symbol of the country. The portrait popularised Jersey Lily as Langtry's nickname, although Langtry was portrayed holding a Guernsey lily (Nerine sarniensis) in the painting, as no Jersey lilies were available. According to tradition, the two Jersey natives spoke Jèrriais during the sittings. The painting attracted great interest when exhibited at the Royal Academy and had to be roped off to avoid damage by the crowds. A friend of Millais, Rupert Potter (father of Beatrix Potter), was a keen amateur photographer and took pictures of Lillie during her visit to Millais in Scotland in 1879. She also sat for Sir Edward Poynter and is depicted in works by Sir Edward Burne-Jones. In early 1878, the Langtrys moved to 17 Norfolk Street (now 19 Dunraven Street) off Park Lane to accommodate the growing demands of Lillie's society visitors.

Lillie Langtry arrived in the late 1870s, the heyday of 'the Professional Beauties'. Margot Asquith later explained that Langtry's youth was the time 'of the great beauties. London worshipped beauty like the Greeks'. According to Asquith, Langtry became the centre of social excitement excelling that around the other 'Beauties'. '"The Jersey Lily" – as Mrs. Langtry was called – had Greek features, a transparent skin, arresting eyes, fair hair, and a firm white throat. She held herself erect, refused to tighten her waist, and to see her walk was as if you saw a beautiful hound set upon its feet. It was a day of conspicuous feminine looks and the miniature beauties of to-day would have passed with praise, but without emotion.'

Her looks offered an opportunity for painters: '[my] sketches of Lillie during her first London season', wrote Miles twenty years later, 'earned far more than I've ever made on the largest commissions for my most expensive paintings.' Lillie gained recognition for her photographic likenesses, a relatively new art. The 'Professional Beauties', all members of high society, were photographed in many different poses. The popularity of collecting these pictures – foreshadowing the popularity of first film stars and later pop stars – was not confined to the middle classes. Also many an aristocratic drawing room had a leather-bound, brass-locked album featuring the faces of the "Professional Beauties" of the season.

Asquith heard from her sister, Chartie Ribblesdale, about a ball at which ‘several fashionable ladies had stood upon their chairs to see Mrs. Langtry come into the room. In a shining top-hat, and skin-tight habit, she rode a chestnut thoroughbred of conspicuous action every evening in Rotten Row. Among her adorers were the Prince of Wales, (King Edward) and the present Earl of Lonsdale.’ Ribblesdale also remembered a story about Langtry and Lonsdale ‘[pausing] at the railings in Rotten Row to talk to a man of her acquaintance. I do not know what she could have said to him, but after a brief exchange of words, Lord Lonsdale jumped off his horse, sprang over the railings, and with clenched fists hit Mrs. Langtry's admirer in the face. Upon this, a free fight ensued, and to the delight of the surprised spectators, Lord Lonsdale knocked his adversary down.'

Recollections of Daisy Greville, Countess of Warwick

"In the studio I found the loveliest woman I have ever seen. And how can any words of mine convey that beauty? I may say that she had dewy, violet eyes, a complexion like a peach, and a mass of lovely hair drawn back in a soft knot at the nape of her classic head. But how can words convey the vitality, the glow, the amazing charm, that made this fascinating woman the centre of any group that entered? She was in the freshness of her young beauty that day in the studio. She was poor, and wore a dowdy black dress, but my stepfather lost his heart to her [...] The friends we had invited to meet the lovely Lily Langtry were as willingly magnetised by her unique personality as we were. To show how little dress has to do with the effect she produced, I may say that for that evening she wore the same dowdy black dress as on the previous day, merely turned back at the throat and trimmed with a Toby frill of white lisse, as some concession to the custom of evening dress. Soon we had the most beautiful woman of the day down at Easton, and my sisters and myself were her admiring slaves. [...] [M]y own infatuation, for it was little less, for lovely Lily Langtry continued for many a day... [...] The average of good looks to-day is much higher, but there is none to equal Lily Langtry."

The royal biographer Theo Aronson has highlighted the importance of social changes that formed the backdrop of Langtry's success. In the late 1870s, high society became less exclusive following the example of the Prince of Wales, who preferred the company of 'very rich men', regardless of whether they had an aristocratic lineage. By the time Langtry was introduced, '[b]usiness acumen, beauty and, to a lesser extent, brains were becoming enough to get one accepted'. This 'opening-up' partially explains the success of Langtry. While she was not an aristocrat and would not have been welcomed during previous decades, her husband was a wealthy landowner and her father, as a clergyman, counted on the same level as landed gentry. Her behaviour was in line with aristocratic expectations: 'her air, despite her vivacity and sensuality, was well-bred: she knew how to conduct herself in public'.

In 1878, Langtry attracted a lot of attention during the Ascot races, being 'at the height of her beauty and fame'. Crowds followed her everywhere she went, and she became 'the most advertised beauty in Europe'. According to Lady Augusta Fane's recollections, Langtry was made so popular by her 'naturalness' and charm; 'she had no affectations and no "make-up," either of face or mind; she was just herself, so no one could help loving her, with her gay, light-hearted nature'. However, there was another reason why Langtry attracted so much attention in 1878: the Prince of Wales was often seen in public with her.

=== Royal mistress ===
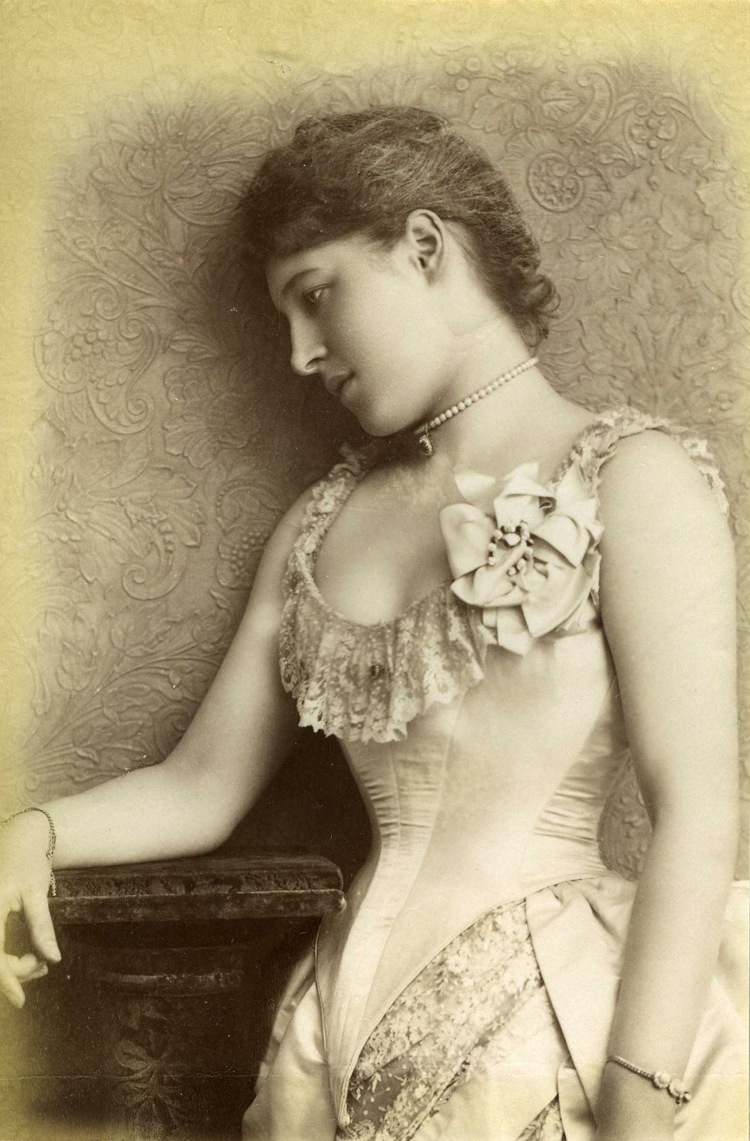
Portrait of Langtry by William Downey of Ebury Street, London, 1885

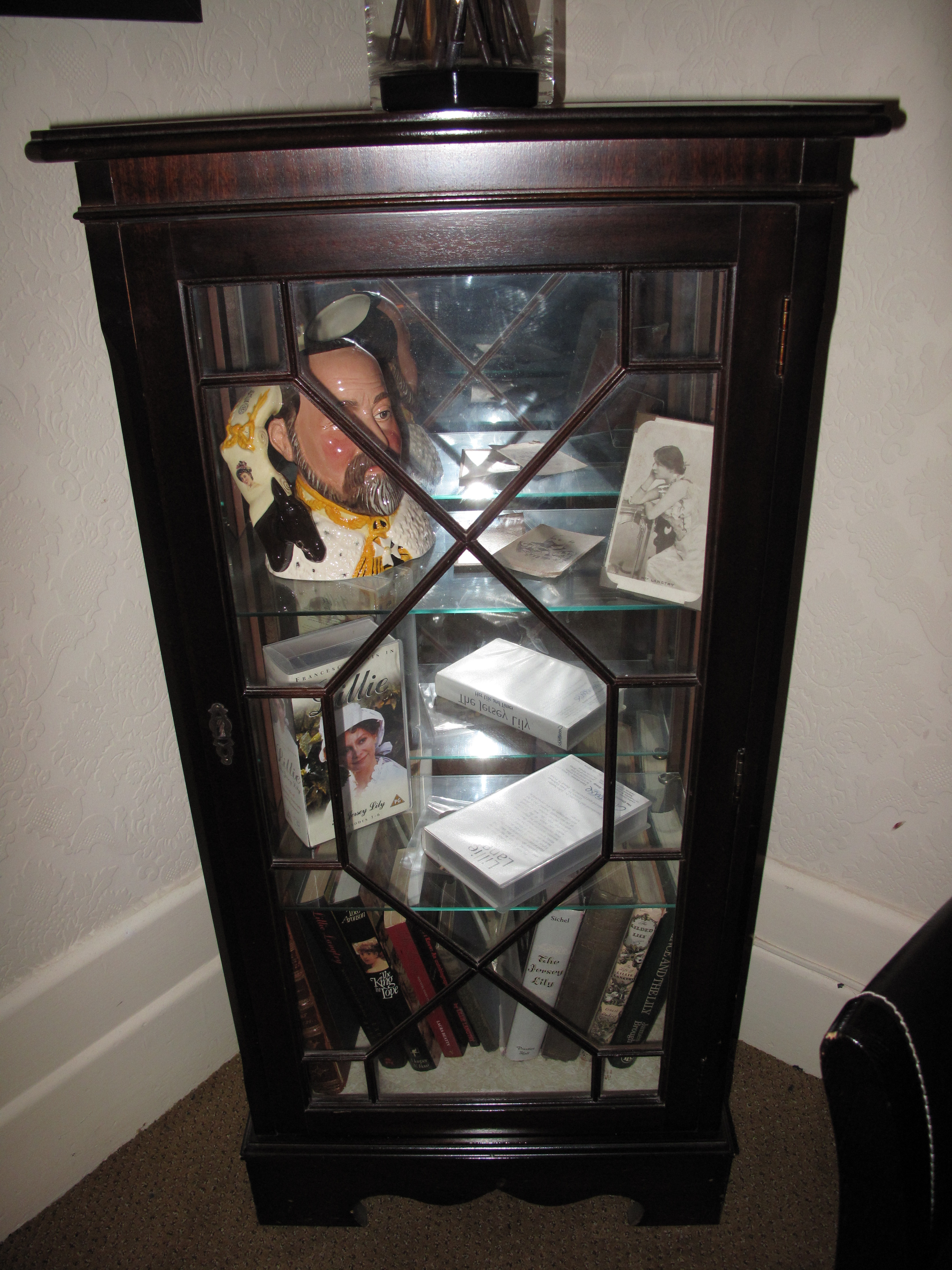
Cupboard in Langtry Manor Hotel - 2010

On 24 May 1877, while his wife was staying in Athens with her brother, King George I of the Hellenes, Albert Edward, Prince of Wales, took supper with the Arctic explorer Sir Allen Young. There, he met Edward and Lillie Langtry. The 23-year-old Lillie had been discovered only a month earlier but had already taken London society by storm. It was soon presumed that Langtry had become the mistress of the Prince of Wales, but no immediate scandal arose. The Prince's wife, Alexandra of Denmark, accepted the situation and received her at parties in Marlborough House, the couple's London residence.

However, there are some doubts. Jane Ridley has questioned the myth which Lillie Langtry created about herself, especially the role of the future Edward VII. She critiques Langtry's narrative of herself as an innocent country girl to whom success just happened. Ridley considers Langtry's entrance to London society to have been carefully planned, even if more successful than she could have hoped. In an 1882 interview, Langtry herself said that '[my] pedigree was good and my person in Jersey society being assured, it was not surprising that I should be well-received'. At the same time, she denied that she had ever set herself up as a beauty. 'I never thought I was one, and I don't think I am now. I am never in the least surprised when I hear people say they are very much disappointed about my beauty'.

Ridley also expressed doubts about the nature of Langtry's relationship with the Prince of Wales. No letters from this time have survived, and many of the stories seem to be exaggerated or wrong. For example, Langtry is alleged to have consummated her relationship with Prince Edward when his wife, Alexandra, refused to accompany him to a royal house party at Crichel in January 1878. In fact, Alexandra played a central role at this event.

According to Ridley, Langtry published a false story about her presentation at court to Queen Victoria. Langtry alleged that despite being presented towards the end of the evening, by when the Queen had usually retired, Victoria waited to see her. At a ball later that night, she was supposedly told that the Queen had 'had a great desire to see [her], and had stayed on in order to satisfy herself as to [Langtry's] appearance. It was even added that she was annoyed because [she] was so late in passing'. Ridley concludes that this anecdote was made up by Langtry, as she alleged the presence of the Prince and Princess of Wales, who were in Paris at the time, probably on purpose to avoid embarrassing them by presenting the alleged mistress of Bertie. In Ridley's view, Langtry invented stories implying that she was recognised as a royal mistress. Langtry Manor in Bournemouth, supposedly built for clandestine meetings between the Prince and Lillie at his orders, was in fact built for Emily Langton Langton.

Ridley could find no evidence about the exact nature of the relationship between Lillie Langtry and the Prince of Wales. However, there is correspondence between the Prince's private secretary, Francis Knollys, and the Prince's solicitor, George Lewis, which suggests that Edward Langtry used George Lewis as a broker, offering his silence and cash in exchange for the Prince's love letters. Lewis kept Knollys closely informed about the death of Edward Langtry in 1897. The Prince of Wales, meanwhile, maintained a lifelong friendship with Lillie.

Whatever it exactly was, Lillie's liaison with the Prince lasted from late 1877 to June 1880.

=== The Shrewsbury scandal ===
In July 1879, Langtry began an affair with Lord Shrewsbury; by January 1880, they were planning to run away together. In the autumn of 1879, Adolphus Rosenberg wrote in Town Talk of rumours that her husband would divorce her and cite, among others, the Prince of Wales as co-respondent. The Prince of Wales instructed his solicitor George Lewis to sue. Rosenberg pleaded guilty and was sentenced to two years in prison.

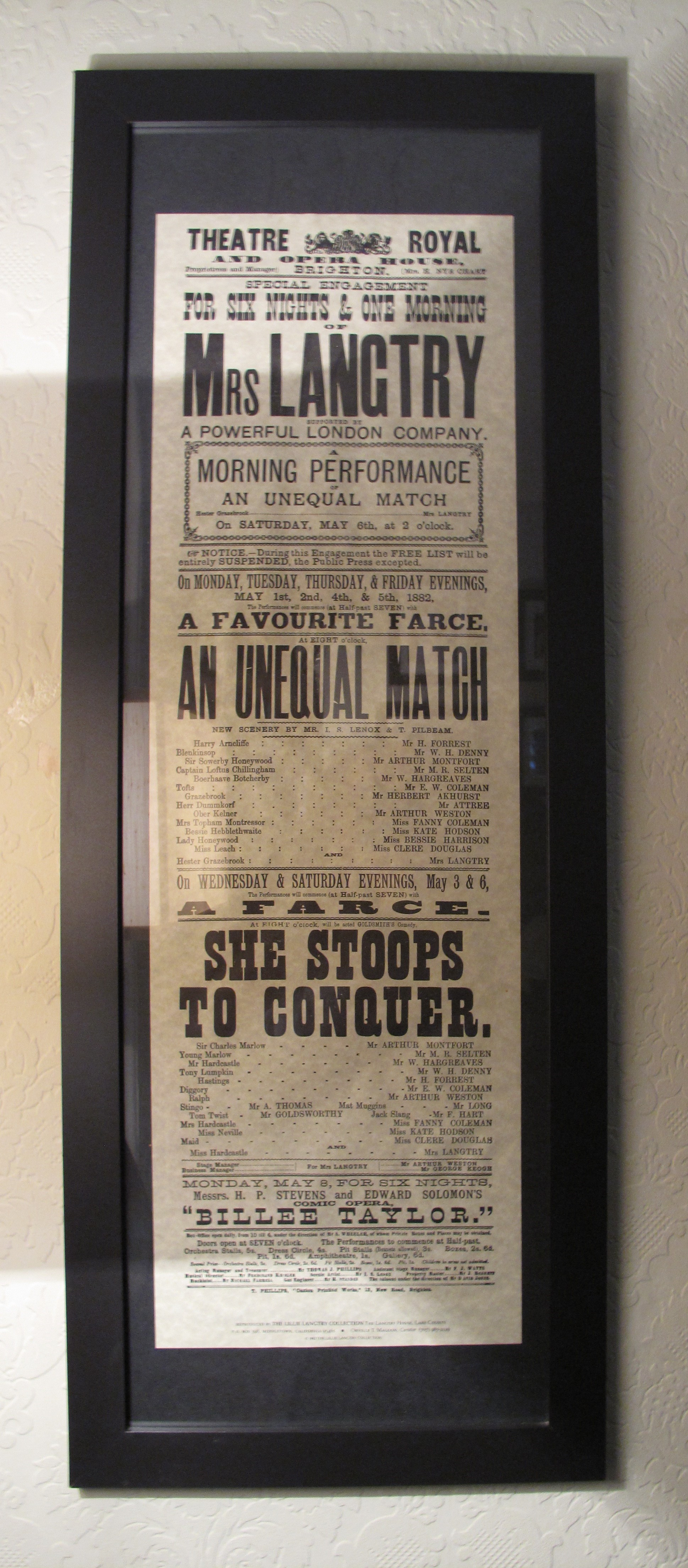
Original poster - on show in Langtry Manor House in 2010.

In 1880, Langtry's reputation was tarnished by the Shrewsbury scandal, rumours of divorce, and a secret pregnancy. Many people refused to receive her, and with the withdrawal of royal favour, creditors started demanding their money. The Langtrys' finances were not equal to their lifestyle. In October 1880, Langtry sold many of her possessions to meet her debts, allowing him to avoid a declaration of bankruptcy. Lillie went abroad to give birth. Afterwards, the Prince of Wales, staunch in friendship, procured an opening for her: he introduced her to the actor-manager Squire Bancroft, who controlled the Haymarket Theatre and the Prince of Wales’ theatres. The Prince of Wales encouraged her by visiting the theatre while she was on stage and did everything in his power to help her.

=== Daughter ===
Lillie Langtry had a short affair with Prince Louis of Battenberg from March 1880.

Letters from Lillie to Arthur Clarence Jones (1854–1930) give the impression she also had an affair, or at least an intimate friendship, with Jones, a childhood friend of her brothers who lived on Jersey. Arthur Jones was the brother of Lillie's sister-in-law; both were illegitimate children of Lord Ranelagh.

In June 1880, Lillie became pregnant. Her husband was not the father; Edward Langtry had walked out after a libel case. The obvious candidate was Prince Louis of Battenberg. Jane Ridley compared the dates with the diary of the Prince of Wales: Prince Louis was staying at Marlborough House on June 27, the likely conception date. Lillie led Prince Louis to believe he was the father of her child. She was lent £2,000 by the Prince of Wales to pay her debts.

At the same time, Edward Langtry, who often visited unannounced, was prevented from seeing her. Edward was constantly occupied with invitations to shoot or fish. Keeping him in ignorance of the pregnancy was vital, as he was angry and resentful. The concern was that if he discovered that Lillie was pregnant by another man, he might sue for divorce, dragging the Prince of Wales into the law courts.

Lillie spent the summer holiday in Jersey. One Friday in October, by now four months pregnant, she visited London briefly and saw the Prince of Wales. On 17 October, the Prince met with his doctor, Oscar Clayton, and saw Louis Battenberg. The same day, Louis departed on a two-year voyage round the world on the warship HMS Inconstant. Lillie was spirited away to France. On 8 March 1881 she gave birth to a girl named Jeanne Marie.

The moment it became clear that Lillie was pregnant, Battenberg's parents acted promptly. An aide-de-camp was sent from the German Jugenheim to arrange a financial settlement. Louis was told that there could be no question of marriage. Suddenly, the Admiralty found an appointment for Louis Mountbatten on The Inconstant. The passionate affair was ended before the child was born and with Louis Battenberg out of the way.

The discovery in 1978 of Langtry's letters to Arthur Jones and publication of quotations from them by Laura Beatty in 1999 support the idea that Jones was the father of Langtry's daughter. Possibly, she told him he was the father of the child. In a letter, she pressed Jones to go a chemist to buy potions to make her miscarry. During her pregnancy she wrote him passionate letters and assured him how much she needed him. Jones probably stayed with her in Paris after she wrote him a letter with the anticipated date she would give birth, according to her doctor.

Prince Louis' son, Earl Mountbatten of Burma, however, had always maintained that his father was the father of Jeanne Marie.

Jeanne Marie was only told who her father was by Margot Asquith when she was 20 years old. A story around this discovery tells that Jeanne Marie complained bitterly of her illegitimacy. She was asked sharply by her mother, 'Who would you prefer to have as a father, a penniless drunken Irishman or a Royal Prince and the most handsome of all naval officers?'

== Descendants ==
In 1902, Jeanne Marie Langtry married the Scottish politician Sir Ian Malcolm at St Margaret's, Westminster. They had four children, three sons and a daughter. Jeanne Marie died in 1964.

Her daughter Mary Malcolm was one of the first two female announcers on the BBC Television Service (now BBC One) from 1948 to 1956. She died on 13 October 2010, aged 92. The Guardian published an obituary mentioning Mary Malcolm was the granddaughter of King Edward VII. It was rectified: 'This obituary of the postwar BBC television announcer Mary Malcolm said her mother, Jeanne-Marie, was the daughter of Lillie Langtry and Edward VII, the only one of his illegitimate children he acknowledged. Although Langtry was Edward VII's mistress, the father of her daughter was acknowledged to be Prince Louis of Battenberg, grandfather of Prince Philip.' The Times published an obituary mentioning Jeanne Marie Langtry had grown-up believing she was the daughter of Edward VII: 'Malcolm had an aristocratic pedigree. She was a granddaughter of Lillie Langtry, actress, beauty and mistress of the Prince of Wales, later Edward VII. Her mother, Jeanne Marie, was conceived and born out of wedlock, and [Lady] Malcolm grew up believing that she was the daughter of a king. Only later did she learn that her father was Prince Louis of Battenberg, whose legitimate children included the future Earl Mountbatten of Burma.' It wasn't rectified. The prestigious Oxford Dictionary of National Biography also names Louis Mountbatten as grandfather of Mary Malcolm. 'Her mother was frequently assumed to be the illegitimate offspring of Edward VII (when prince of Wales). She was not. Jeanne-Marie's father was (or at least was acknowledged to be) German-born Prince Louis of Battenberg. He anglicised his name on settling in Britain and it was his grandson Philip Mountbatten who in due course would marry into royalty and become Duke of Edinburgh and consort of Queen Elizabeth II.' Arthur Jones isn't mentioned. The Daily Telegraph did mention Lillie Langtry, but not the assumed (grand)father.

Jeanne Marie's second son, Victor Neill Malcolm, married English actress Ann Todd. They divorced in the late 1930s. Victor Malcolm remarried in 1942 to an American, Mary Ellery Channing.

== Acting career and manager ==
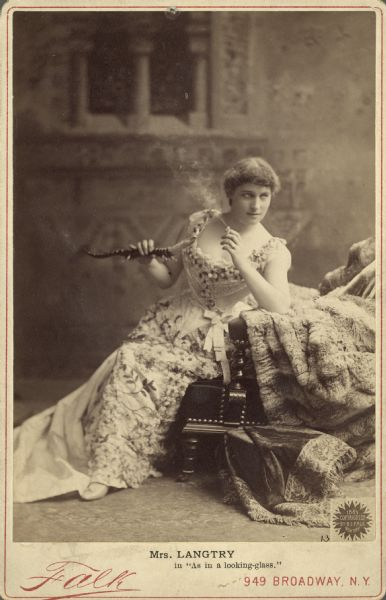
Lillie Langtry in character as the adventuress Lena Despard from the 1887 play As in a Looking-Glass

In 1881, Langtry was in need of money. Her close friend Oscar Wilde suggested she try the stage, and Langtry embarked upon a theatrical career. She first auditioned for an amateur production in the Twickenham Town Hall on 19 November 1881. It was a comedy two-hander called A Fair Encounter, with Henrietta Labouchère taking the other role and coaching Langtry in her acting. Labouchère had been a professional actress before she met and married Liberal MP Henry Labouchère.

Following favourable reviews of this first attempt at the stage, and with further coaching, Langtry made her debut before the London public, playing Kate Hardcastle in She Stoops to Conquer at the West End's Haymarket Theatre in December 1881. Critical opinion was mixed, but she was a success with the public. She next performed in Ours at the same theatre. Although her affair with the Prince of Wales was over, he supported her new venture by attending several of her performances and helping attract an audience.

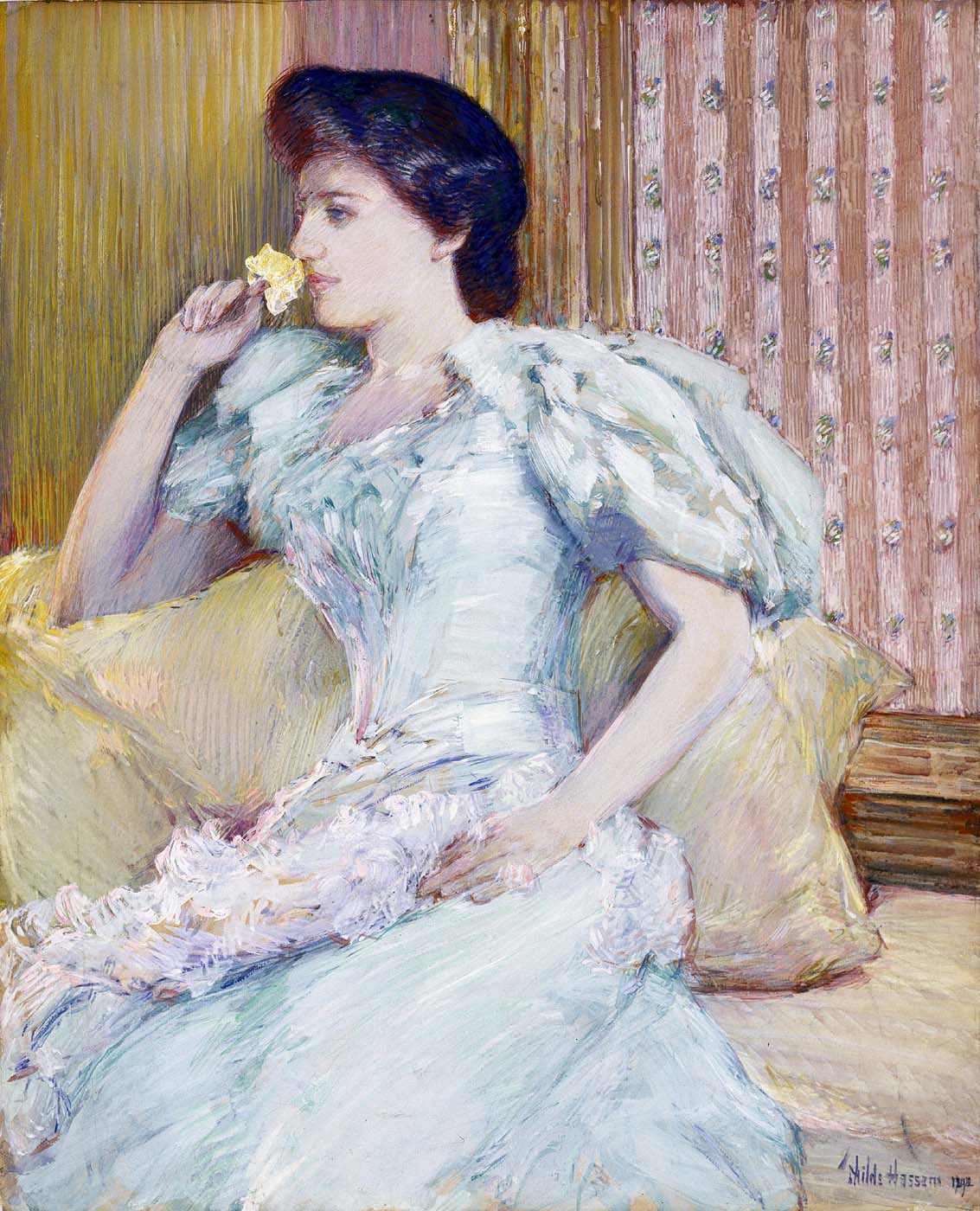
Portrait of Langtry by Childe Hassam at the Smithsonian Museum of American Art

Early in 1882, Langtry quit the production at the Haymarket and started her own company, touring the UK with various plays. She was still under the tutelage of Henrietta Labouchère. American impresario Henry Abbey arranged a tour in the United States for Langtry. She arrived in October 1882 to be met by the press and Oscar Wilde, who was in New York on a lecture tour. Her first appearance was eagerly anticipated, but the theatre burnt down the night before the opening. The show moved to another venue and opened the following week. Eventually, her production company started a coast-to-coast tour of the US, ending in May 1883 with a "fat profit." Before leaving New York, she had an acrimonious break with Henrietta Labouchère over Langtry's relationship with Frederick Gebhard, a wealthy young American. Her first tour of the US (accompanied by Gebhard) was an enormous success, which she repeated in subsequent years. While critics generally condemned her interpretations of roles such as Pauline in The Lady of Lyons or Rosalind in As You Like It, the public loved her. After her return from New York in 1883, Langtry registered at the Conservatoire in Paris for six weeks' intensive training to improve her acting technique.

In 1889, she took on the part of Lady Macbeth in Shakespeare's Macbeth. In 1896 she played the role of Mrs Barry in Gossip, at the Comedy Theatre, London, The play, written by Clyde Fitch and Leo Dietrichstein, was based on Suggestions Found in a Novel by Jules Claretie, 'Monsieur le ministre'. The New York Times thought that 'Mrs Langtry's jewels were worth $100,000; her attire was so wonderful, so dazzling, so recklessly inappropriate - as it seemed - that a murmur of surprise ran through the auditorium'. In 1903, she starred in the US in The Crossways, written by her in collaboration with J. Hartley Manners, husband of actress Laurette Taylor. She returned to the US for tours in 1906 and again in 1912, appearing in vaudeville. She last appeared on stage in America in 1917. Later that year, she made her final appearance in the theatre in London.

From 1900 to 1903, with financial support from Edgar Israel Cohen, Langtry became the lessee and manager of London's Imperial Theatre. It opened on 21 April 1901, following an extensive refurbishment. On the site of the theatre is now the Westminster Central Hall. In a film released in 1913 directed by Edwin S. Porter, Langtry starred opposite Sidney Mason in the role of Mrs Norton in His Neighbor's Wife in what would be her only film appearance.

== Thoroughbred racing ==
For nearly a decade, from 1882 to 1891, Langtry had a relationship with an American, Frederick Gebhard, described as a young clubman, sportsman, and horse owner. Gebhard's wealth was inherited; his maternal grandfather Thomas E. Davis was one of the wealthiest New York real estate owners of the period. His paternal grandfather, Dutchman Frederick Gebhard, came to New York in 1800 and developed a mercantile business that expanded into banking and railroad stocks. Gebhard's father died when he was 5 years old and his mother died when he was about 10. He and his sister, Isabelle, were raised by a guardian, paternal uncle William H Gebhard.

With Gebhard, Langtry became involved in horse racing. In 1885, she and Gebhard brought a stable of American horses to race in England. On 13 August 1888, Langtry and Gebhard travelled in her private carriage attached to an Erie Railroad express train bound for Chicago. Another railcar was transporting 17 of their horses when it derailed at Shohola, Pennsylvania, at 1:40 am. Rolling down an 80-foot (24 m) embankment, it burst into flames. One person died in the fire, along with Gebhard's champion runner Eole and 14 racehorses belonging to him and Langtry. Two horses survived the wreck, including St Saviour, full brother to Eole. He was named for St Saviour's Church in Jersey, where Langtry's father had been rector and where she chose to be buried. Despite speculation, Langtry and Gebhard never married. In 1895, he married Lulu Morris of Baltimore; they divorced in 1901. In 1905 he married Marie Wilson; he died in 1910.

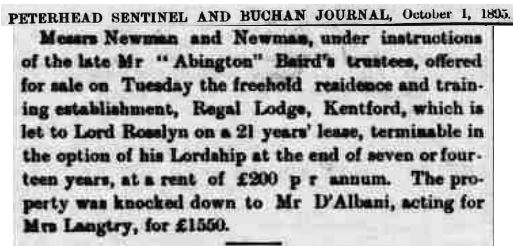
Langtry buys Regal Lodge (situated in the village of Kentford, near Newmarket in the English county of Suffolk) from Baird's estate in 1893

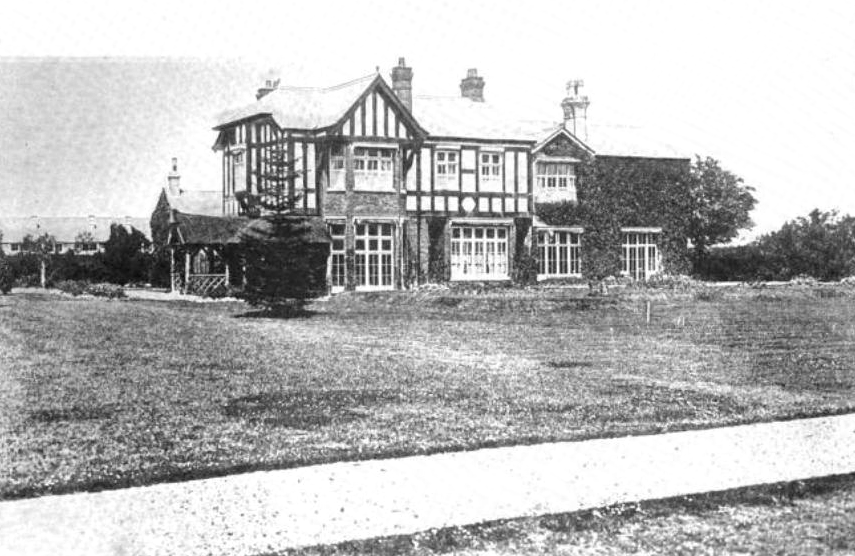
Regal Lodge in 1899

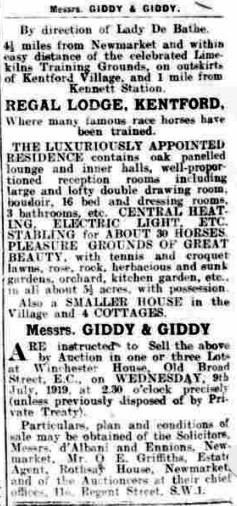
Sale of Regal Lodge in 1919

In 1889, Langtry met "an eccentric young bachelor, with vast estates in Scotland, a large breeding stud, a racing stable, and more money than he knew what to do with": this was George Alexander Baird or Squire Abington, as he came to be known. He inherited wealth from his grandfather, who with seven of his sons, had developed and prospered from coal and iron workings. Baird's father had died when he was a young boy, leaving him a fortune in trust. In addition, he inherited the estates of two wealthy uncles who had died childless.

Langtry and Baird met at a racecourse when he gave her a betting tip and the stake money to place on the horse. The horse won and, at a later luncheon party, Baird also offered her the gift of a horse named Milford. She at first demurred, but others at the table advised her to accept, as this horse was a very fine prospect. The horse won several races under Langtry's colours; he was registered to "Mr Jersey" (women were excluded from registering horses at this time). Langtry became involved in a relationship with Baird, from 1891 until his death in March 1893.

When Baird died, Langtry purchased two of his horses, Lady Rosebery and Studley Royal, at the estate dispersal sale. She moved her training to Sam Pickering's stables at Kentford House and took Regal Lodge as a residence in the village of Kentford, near Newmarket, Suffolk. The building is a short distance from Baird's original racehorse breeding establishment, which has since been renamed Meddler Stud.

Langtry found mentors in Captain James Octavius Machell and Joe Thompson, who provided guidance on all matters related to the turf. When her trainer Pickering failed to deliver results, she moved her expanded string of 20 horses to Fred Webb at Exning. In 1899, James Machell sold his Newmarket stables to Colonel Harry Leslie Blundell McCalmont, a wealthy racehorse owner, who was Langtry's brother-in-law, having married Hugo de Bathe's sister Winifred in 1897. He was also related to Langtry's first husband, Edward, whose ship-owning grandfather George had married into the County Antrim Callwell family, being related in marriage to the McCalmonts.

Told of a good horse for sale in Australia called Merman, she purchased it and had it shipped to England; such shipments were risky and she had a previous bad experience with a horse arriving injured (Maluma). Merman was regarded as one of the best stayers; he eventually went on to win the Lewes Handicap, the Cesarewitch, Jockey Club Cup, Goodwood Stakes, Goodwood Cup, and Ascot Gold Cup (with Tod Sloan up). Langtry later had a second Cesarewitch winner with Yentoi, and a third place with Raytoi. An imported horse from New Zealand called Uniform won the Lewes Handicap for her.

Other trainers used by Langtry were Jack Robinson, who trained at Foxhill in Wiltshire, and a very young Fred Darling, whose first big success was Yentoi's 1908 Cesarewitch.

Langtry owned a stud at Gazely, Newmarket. This venture was not a success. After a few years, she gave up attempts to breed blood-stock. Langtry sold Regal Lodge and all her horse-racing interests in 1919 before she moved to Monaco. Regal Lodge had been her home for twenty-three years and received many celebrated guests, notably the Prince of Wales.

In honour of her contributions to thoroughbred racing, since 2014 the Glorious Goodwood meeting has held the Group 2 Lillie Langtry Stakes.

== William Ewart Gladstone – Prime Minister ==
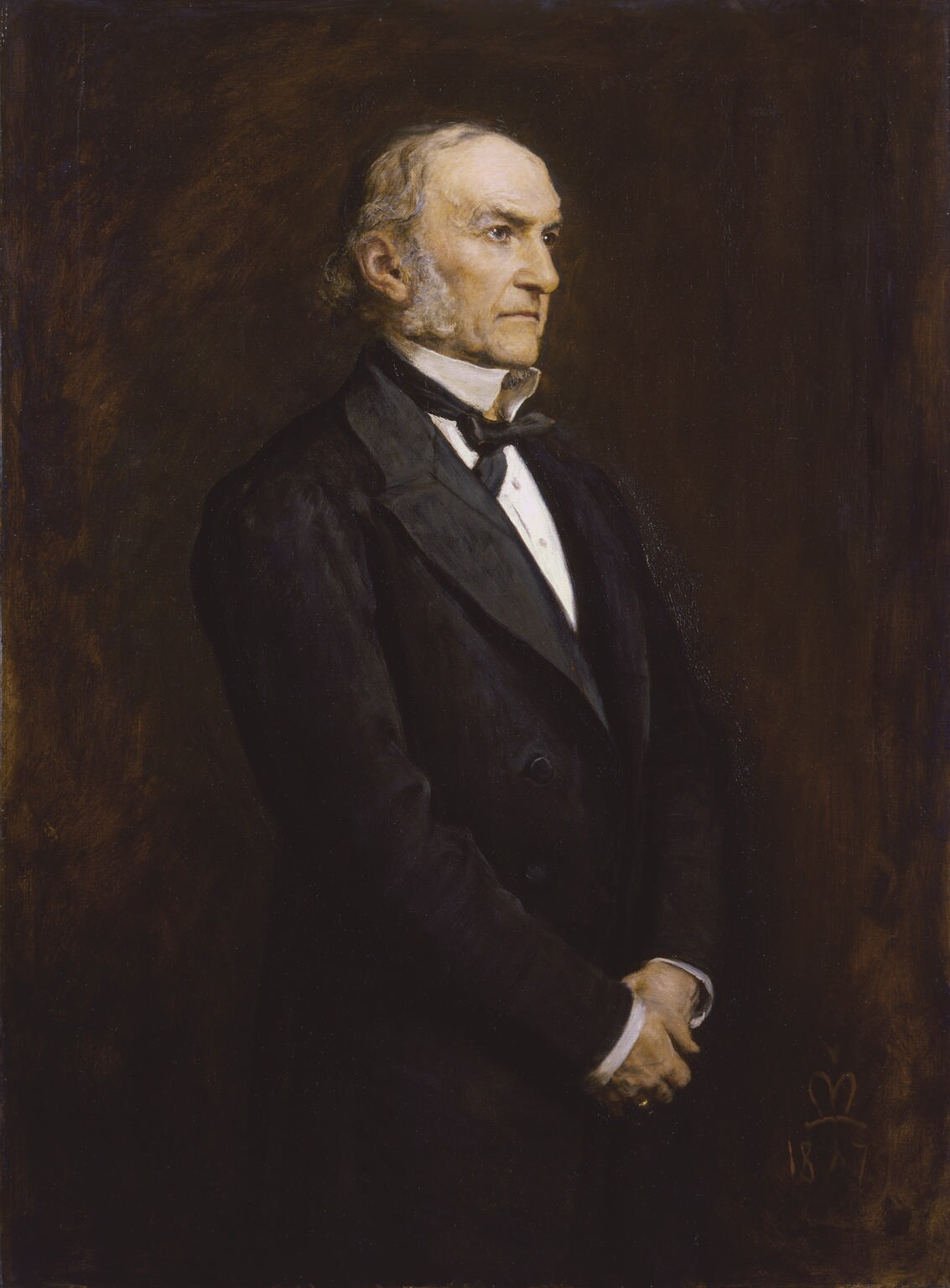
Portrait of William Ewart Gladstone by John Everett Millais, 1879

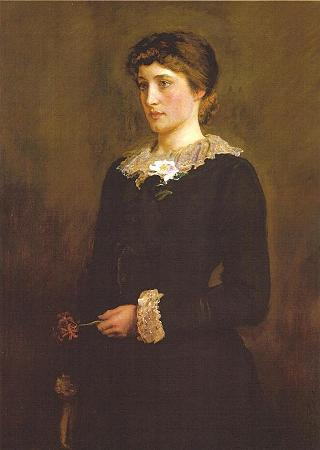
Lillie Langtry, painted by Millais in 1878 - A year before the Gladstone-portrait by Millais. Lillie Langry in her memoirs said: 'It was while I was sitting for Millais, by and by, that I made Gladstone's acquaintance, the artist being engaged at the same time in painting the familiar, speaking likeness of the great statesman which is now in the National Portrait Gallery, London.'

During her stage career, Lillie Langtry became friendly with William Ewart Gladstone (1809–1898), who was the Prime Minister on four occasions during the reign of Queen Victoria. In her memoirs, Langtry says that she first met Gladstone when she was posing for her portrait at Millais' studio. Later he became a mentor to her.

However, this was probably also a piece of make-believe by Lillie Langtry herself. The biographers of William Ewart Gladstone think otherwise. They are also quite cynical about Lillie's motives.

Lillie Langtry in The Days I Knew:

One of the most gratifying features of my debut was the concern in my new departure displayed by that gifted being, W.E. Gladstone. Although we had met casually at Millais's studio I had not known him further. But now he came often to see me and would drop in (he was Prime Minister at the time) to find me eating my dinner before going to the theatre. How wonderful it seemed that this great and universally sought-after man should give me and my work even a passing thought. But he did more. His comprehensive mind and sweet nature grasped the difficult task that lay before me, the widely different orbit in which my life would henceforth move, and he knew how adrift I felt. And out of his vast knowledge of the public he realised how much he could help me—so the salmon advised the minnow. Never shall I forget the wisdom of Gladstone and the uplifting effects of his visits. Sometimes he read aloud his favourite passages from Shakespeare. Then, again, he would bring me books. He was truly religious, believing, he told me "with the simple faith of a child". And one could not be in his company without feeling that goodness emanating from him.... Among his many excellent admonitions I remember, and shall always remember, this sound piece of advice. He said. In "In your professional career, you will receive attacks, personal and critical, just and unjust. Bear them, never reply, and, above all, never rush into print to explain or defend yourself. And I never have.

However, it was not Gladstone who sought Lillie out; the approach came from Lillie. Abraham Hayward, an influential journalist, wrote Gladstone a letter, dated 8 January 1882: 'Mrs Langtry, who is an enthusiastic admirer of yours, told me this afternoon that she should be feel highly flattered if you would call on her, and I tell you this, although I fear you have other more pressing overtures just at present. Her address is 18 Albert Mansions, Victoria Street, and she is generally at home about six.'

The published diaries of Gladstone show there were indeed contacts between Lillie Langtry and one of the most important British statesmen. However, the editor of Gladstone diaries doubts the friendship was, from Gladstone's point of view, important. Gladstone was a regular theatre-goer and moved enthusiastically among some theatre-sets. He frequently visited performances of drawing-room comedies and drama. Rumours were not surprising given Lillie's reputation and the gossip about Gladstone's nocturnal activities which circulated in London clubs. Gladstone was in the habit of wanting to "rescue" prostitutes by trying to convince them it was best not to live in sin and to find a decent job. Gladstone noted on 3 April 1882 in his diary: 'I hardly know what estimate to form of her. Her manners are very pleasing, & she has a working spirit in her'. On 16 February 1885 he wrote: 'Saw Mrs Langtry: probably for the last time.' Gladstone's private secretary was worried about the contacts between Lillie Langtry and Gladstone: he was afraid she tried to make social capital out of their contacts. 'Last week Mr. G. received an invitation to a Sunday "at home" from Mrs Langtry. He did not avail himself of it, but he went and called at her house. He did not even see her, but all kinds of rumours are already abroad about his intimacy with the "professional beauty". These rumours would have had much greater currency and better foundation, had he gone to the evening party, out of which I think we managed to frighten him and the card for which I first thought of hiding and saying nothing about. Certainly Rosebery spoke not a day too early about the night walks, which are now openly talked of in Society.' Things even became worse. Gladstone presented Lillie Langry a copy of his favourite book, Sister Dora – a biography of a high-born woman who worked as a nurse among the poor. Hamilton: 'She is evidently trying to make social capital out the acquaintance which scraped with him. Most disagreeable things with all kinds of exaggeration are being said. I took the occasion of putting a word and cautioning him against the wiles of the woman, whose reputation is in such bad odour that, despite all the endeavours of H.R.H., nobody will receive in their houses.' It seems Lillie Langtry had become by April 1882 a social outcast, with two important men who tried to help her: the Prince of Wales and the Prime Minister. Hamilton tried to protect his boss, but had a shrewd woman against him. 'She had evidently been told to resort to the double-envelope system which secures respect from our rude hand; and she is now making pretty constant use of this privilege and boasting in proportion.' Hamilton could do nothing: the letters became more frequent, but he couldn't read them. However, the much later published diaries of Gladstone himself show Hamilton had little to fear: there were little personal contacts with Lillie Langtry. Gladstone wrote her exactly one letter in the short period after Lillie tried to (re)make contact with him while Gladstone didn't know well how to deal with the situation.

In 1925, Captain Peter Emmanuel Wright published a book called Portraits and Criticisms. In it, he claimed that Gladstone had numerous extramarital affairs, including one with Langtry. Gladstone's son Herbert Gladstone wrote a letter calling Wright a liar, a coward and a fool; Wright sued him. During the trial, a telegram, sent by Langtry from Monte Carlo, was read out in court saying, "I strongly repudiate the slanderous accusations of Peter Wright." The jury found against Wright, saying that the "gist of the defendant's letter of 27 July was true" and that the evidence vindicated the high moral standards of the late Gladstone.

== American citizenship and divorce ==
In 1888, Langtry became a property owner in the United States when she and Frederick Gebhard purchased adjoining ranches in Lake County, California. She established a winery with an area of 4,200 acres (7 sq mi) in Guenoc Valley, producing red wine. She sold it in 1906. Bearing the Langtry Farms name, the winery and vineyard are still in operation in Middletown, California.

During her travels in the United States, Langtry became an American citizen and on 13 May 1897, divorced her husband Edward in Lakeport, California. Her ownership of land in America was introduced in evidence at her divorce to help demonstrate to the judge that she was a citizen of the country. In June of that year Edward Langtry issued a statement giving his side of the story, which was published in the New York Journal.

Edward died a few months later in Chester Asylum, after being found by police in a demented condition at Crewe railway station. His death was probably the result of a brain haemorrhage after a fall during a steamer crossing from Belfast to Liverpool. He was buried in Overleigh Cemetery; a verdict of accidental death was returned at the inquest. A letter of condolence later written by Langtry to another widow reads in part, "I too have lost a husband, but alas! it was no great loss."

Langtry continued to have involvement with her husband's Irish properties after his death. These were compulsorily purchased from her in 1928 under the Northern Ireland Land Act, 1925. This was passed after the Partition of Ireland, with the purpose of transferring certain lands from owners to tenants.

== Hugo Gerald de Bathe ==
After the divorce from her husband, Langtry was linked in the popular press to Prince Paul Esterhazy, an Austro-Hungarian diplomat. They shared time together and both had an interest in horse-racing. However, in 1899, she married 28-year-old Hugo Gerald de Bathe (1871–1940), son of General Sir Henry de Bathe, 4th Baronet (1823-1907), an Anglo-Irish nobleman, and Charlotte Clare. Hugo's parents had initially not married, because of objections from the de Bathe family. They lived together and seven of their children were born out of wedlock. They married after the death of Sir Henry's father in 1870. Hugo was their first son to be born in wedlock—making him heir to the baronetcy.

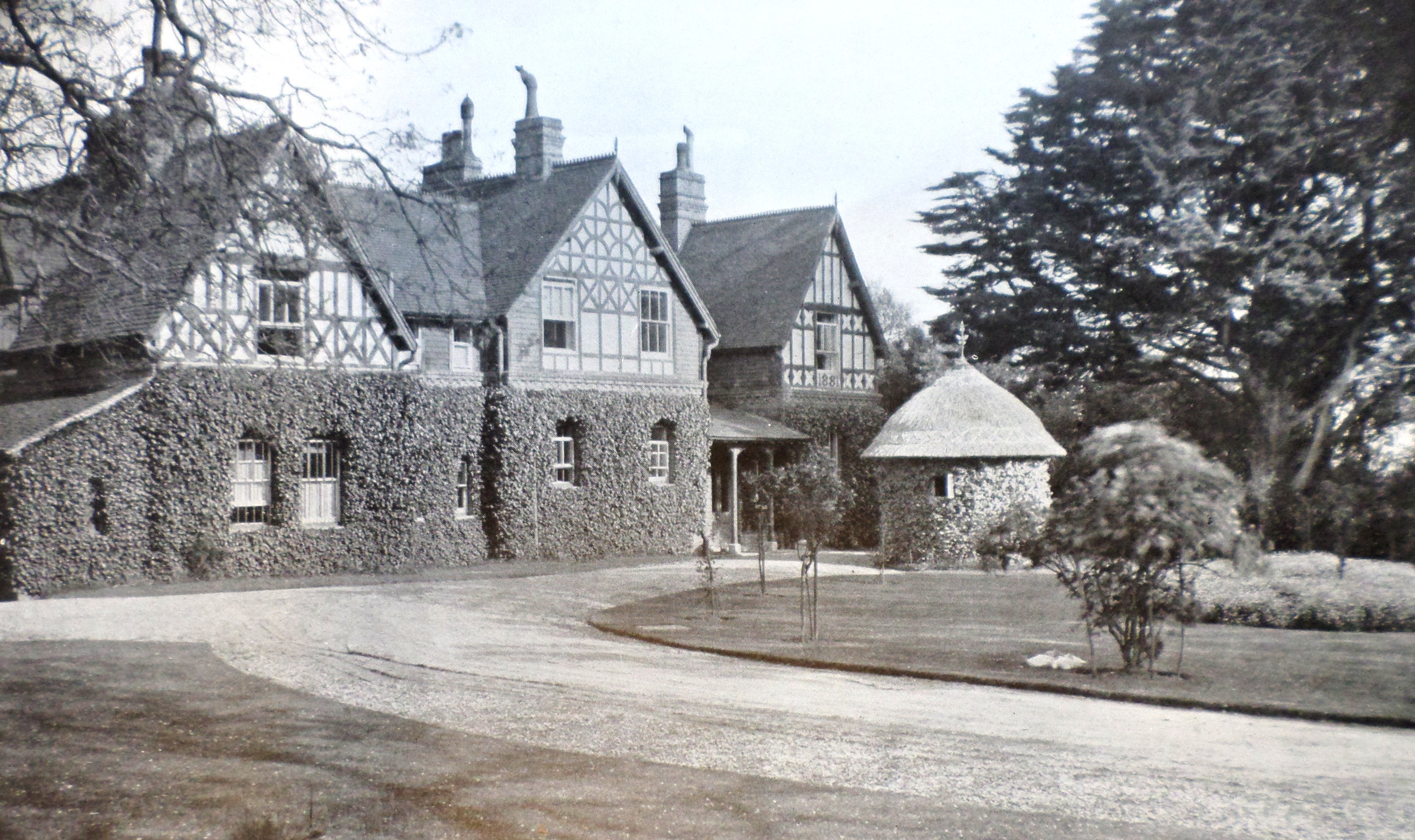
Hollandsfield in Chichester, England

The wedding between Langtry and de Bathe took place in St Saviour's Church, Jersey, on 27 July 1899, with her daughter Jeanne Marie Langtry being the only other person present, apart from the officials. This was the same day that Langtry's horse Merman won the Goodwood Cup. In December 1899, de Bathe volunteered to join the British forces in the Boer War. He was assigned to the Robert's Horse Mounted brigade as a lieutenant. In 1907, General de Bathe, Hugo's father, died; Hugo thus became the 5th Baronet, and Langtry became Lady de Bathe.

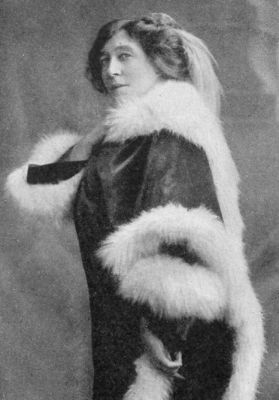
Langtry as Lady de Bathe, circa 1915

When Sir Hugo de Bathe became the 5th Baronet, he inherited properties in Sussex, Devon and Ireland; those in Sussex were in the hamlet of West Stoke near Chichester. These were Woodend, with 17 bedrooms and set in 71 acres; Hollandsfield, with 10 bedrooms and set in 52 acres; and Balsom's Farm of 206 acres. Woodend was retained as the de Bathe residence whilst the smaller Hollandsfield was let. Today the buildings retain their period appearance. Modifications and additions have been made, and the complex is now multi-occupancy. One of the houses on the site is named Langtry and another Hardy. The de Bathe properties were all sold in 1919, the same year Lady de Bathe sold Regal Lodge.

== Death ==
During her final years, Langtry, as Lady de Bathe, resided in Monaco whilst her husband, Sir Hugo de Bathe, lived in Vence, Alpes Maritimes. The two saw one another at social gatherings or in brief private encounters. During World War I, Hugo de Bathe was an ambulance driver for the French Red Cross.

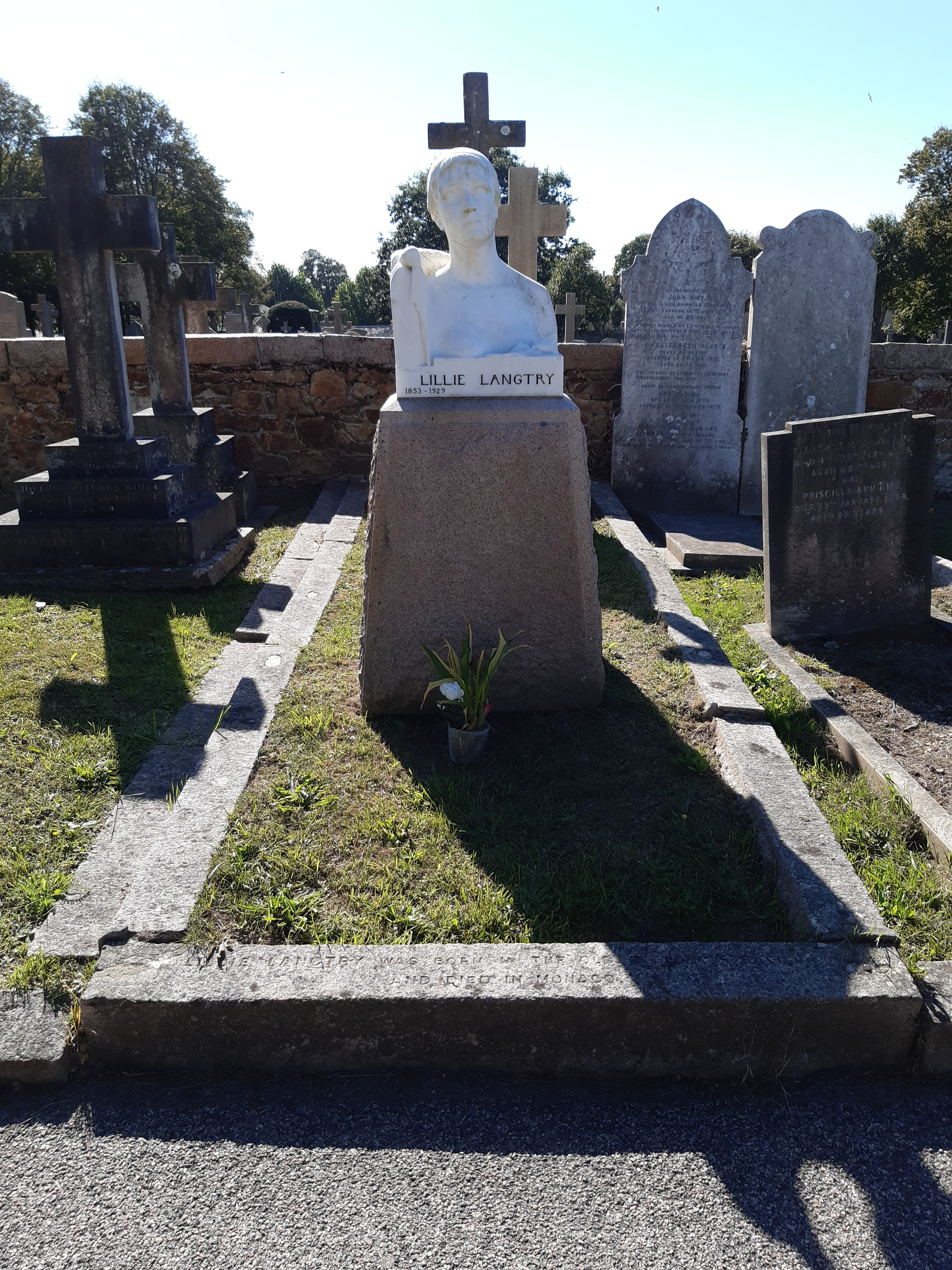
Lillie Langtry's grave in Saint Saviour, Jersey

Langtry's closest companion during her time in Monaco was her friend Mathilde Marie Peat. Peat was at Langtry's side during the final days of her life as she was dying of pneumonia in Monte Carlo. Langtry left Peat £10,000, the Monaco property known as Villa le Lys, clothes, and her motor car.

Langtry died in Monaco at dawn on 12 February 1929. She had asked to be buried in her parents' tomb at St Saviour's Church in Jersey. Blizzards delayed the journey, but her body was taken to St Malo and across to Jersey on 22 February aboard the steamer Saint Brieuc. Her coffin lay in St Saviour's overnight surrounded by flowers, and she was buried on the afternoon of 23 February.

Langtry’s death made headlines in British newspapers.

The Daily Mail remembered Lillie Langtry as one of the most famous beauties of the closed century. 'In more modern times it was her acting that brought her renown, but in her youth she took London by storm on account of her dazzling loveliness, and it was indeed her good looks and her wit that enabled her to go on the stage when her first husband lost his fortune.' In the following weeks the newspaper reported on her estate, her funeral and a memorial service.

The Daily Telegraph published both a news article and an obituary full of memories of a contemporary of Lillie Langtry who had known her in society years and had followed her acting career. ‘She was one of the first and probably the most popular of the ladies who were universally known at that time as "Society beauties” ... Eventually she resolved to go on the stage, and she did an immense amount of work in America as well as in England during a period of about 35 years. She overcame many obstacles, and, although she was never a great actress, her beauty and her charm of manner brought her a large measure of success.’

The Times published on three different pages a news alert from the correspondent in Paris, a photograph and an obituary. In the obituary the newspaper looked back at the start and the development of Langtry's career. It stated that in her first appearance on 15 December 1881—as Kate Hardcastle, in She Stoops to Conquer—all sections of society had fought for highly priced seats in the theatre. ‘The audience, which included the Prince and Princess of Wales, and representatives of eminence in fashion, art, and literature, received Mrs. Langtry very quietly, but the debutante soon overcame the feeling of prejudice…. Mrs. Langtry became so popular in America that she paid many visits to that country, her last being in 1915. Her personality counted for much, and she gradually acquired the technique of the stage. But she never succeeded in touching the emotions, the common chord of humanity….’

The Manchester Guardian remembered Lillie Langtry mainly as a "reigning beauty". 'The London of the eighties and nineties, when the "Jersey Lily," whose death is announced, had her heyday, seems even more remote than the passage of years warrants. To a generation whose manifold interests in life have enormously increased in comparison with their fathers' it seems incredible that barely a generation ago crowds should have assembled in thousands to stare at or cheer a "reigning beauty." Yet Mrs. Langtry, though the most famous of her kind, was no exception as a social institution....A world with the "movies" and the wireless to amuse it, a world, moreover, in which the sexes meet on more practical terms than in the past, has more to do than mob a handsome woman for the sake of her looks. But it can at least admire the "Jersey Lily" for one fact in her curious career – that when hard times came she turned to hard work for the theatre. That work was seldom artistically notable but it revealed a force of character on which those who reckoned her by looks alone had hardly counted.'

In the United States the death of Lillie Langtry was front-page news for the New York Times. The article, with the streamer 'was idolized by society', was continued with a large obituary at page 12.

The Washington Post reported the news on page 13, but still in a prominent way: a friend of King of Edward VII and one of the most popular women of stage had died. On 17 February 1929 the Washington Post continued: 'especially in New York the former actress was adored, but this didn't spoil the famous English beauty.'

The Los Angeles Times paid tribute to the former actress and her 'notable career' on page 1.

=== Bequests ===
Immediately after her death, the Daily Mail published exclusive news: ‘The Daily Mail understands that Lady de Bathe, (Mrs. Langtry, " the Jersey Lily "), who died at Monte Carlo on February 12, has made a number of personal bequests in her will. The famous actress has (left £10,000, her jewellery, and her villa, Le Lys, Monte Carlo, to Mrs. Peat, who was with her during her last illness and for 16 years her constant friend and companion. To her daughter, Lady (Ian) Malcolm, Lady de Bathe left the family old silver from Jersey. To the two daughters of Lady (Ian) Malcolm she left £5,000 each. Lady de Bathe left her motorcar to her maid Mathilde, who was with her for 15 years. The daughter of the Very Rev. W. C. E. le Breton, Dean of Jersey, Lady de Bathe offered to the museum at St. Helier, Jersey, antique furniture, with the proviso that should the museum authorities not want the furniture it is to revert to the maid Mathilde. Mrs. Peat, a pale, middle-aged woman wearing a black fur coat over a black gown, left Paddington for Jersey last night. She was accompanied by Lady Malcolm and the solicitor to the estate.’

In 1928 the Daily Mail reported an Italian man was arrested charged with the theft of nearly £1,000 worth of jewellery from Lady de Bathe at her villa, Le Lys. Only one of the missing jewels, a ring, had been recovered.

In her will, Langtry left £2,000 to a young man of whom she had become fond in later life, named Charles Louis D'Albani; the son of a Newmarket solicitor, he was born in about 1891. She also left £1,000 to A. T. Bulkeley Gavin of 5 Berkeley Square, London, a physician and surgeon who treated wealthy patients. In 1911 he had been engaged to author Katherine Cecil Thurston, who died before they could marry; she had already changed her will in favour of Bulkeley Gavin.

== Cultural influence and portrayals ==
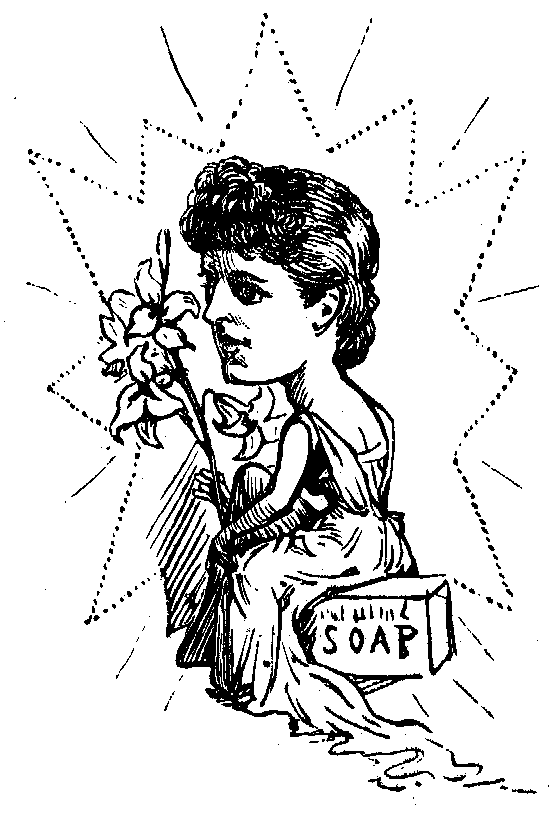
Caricature of Langtry, from Punch, Christmas 1890: The soap box on which she sits reflects her endorsements of cosmetics and soaps.

Considered one of the most glamorous British women of her era, Langtry used her high public profile to endorse commercial products such as cosmetics and soap—an early example of celebrity endorsement. She used her famous ivory complexion to generate income, being the first woman to endorse a commercial product when she began advertising Pears soap in 1882. The aesthetic movement in England became directly involved in advertising, and Pears (under advertising pioneer Thomas J. Barratt) recruited Langtry—who had been painted by aesthete artists—to promote their products, which included putting her "signature" on the advertisements.

In the 1944 Universal film The Scarlet Claw, Lillian Gentry, the first murder victim, wife of Lord William Penrose and former actress, is an oblique reference to Langtry.

Langtry has been portrayed in two films. Lilian Bond played her in The Westerner (1940), and Ava Gardner in The Life and Times of Judge Roy Bean (1972). Bean was played by Walter Brennan in the former, and by Paul Newman in the latter film.

In 1978, Langtry's story was dramatised by London Weekend Television and produced as Lillie, starring Francesca Annis in the title role (Annis received the British Academy Television Award for Best Actress). Annis previously played Langtry in two episodes of ATV's Edward the Seventh. Jenny Seagrove played her in the 1991 television film Incident at Victoria Falls.

Langtry is a featured character in the fictional The Flashman Papers novels of George MacDonald Fraser, in which she is noted as a former lover of arch-cad Harry Flashman, who, nonetheless, describes her as one of his few true loves.

Langtry is suggested as an inspiration for Irene Adler, a character in the Sherlock Holmes fiction of Sir Arthur Conan Doyle. In "A Scandal in Bohemia", Adler bests Holmes, perhaps the only woman to do so.

Langtry is used as a touchstone for old-fashioned manners in Preston Sturges's comedy The Lady Eve (1941), in a scene where a corpulent woman drops a handkerchief on the floor and the hero ignores it. Jean (Barbara Stanwyck) begins to describe, comment on, and anticipate the events that we see reflected in her hand mirror: "The dropped kerchief! That hasn't been used since Lillie Langtry ... you'll have to pick it up yourself, madam ... it's a shame, but he doesn't care for the flesh, he'll never see it."

Lillie Langtry is the inspiration for The Who's 1967 hit single "Pictures of Lily", as mentioned in Pete Townshend's 2012 memoir Who I Am. Dixie Carter portrays Langtry as a "songbird" and Brady Hawkes' love interest in Kenny Rogers' 1994 Gambler V: Playing for Keeps, the last of the Gambler series for CBS that started in 1980. Langtry is depicted as a singer, not an actress, and Dixie Carter's costuming appears closer to Mae West than anything Langtry ever wore.

In The Simpsons 1994 episode "Burns' Heir", the auditions are held in the Lillie Langtry Theater on Burns' estate.

Langtry is a featured character in the play Sherlock Holmes and the Case of the Jersey Lily by Katie Forgette. In this work, she is blackmailed over her past relationship with the Prince of Wales, with intimate letters as proof. She and Oscar Wilde employ Sherlock Holmes and Dr. Watson to investigate the matter.

== Places connected with Lillie Langtry ==
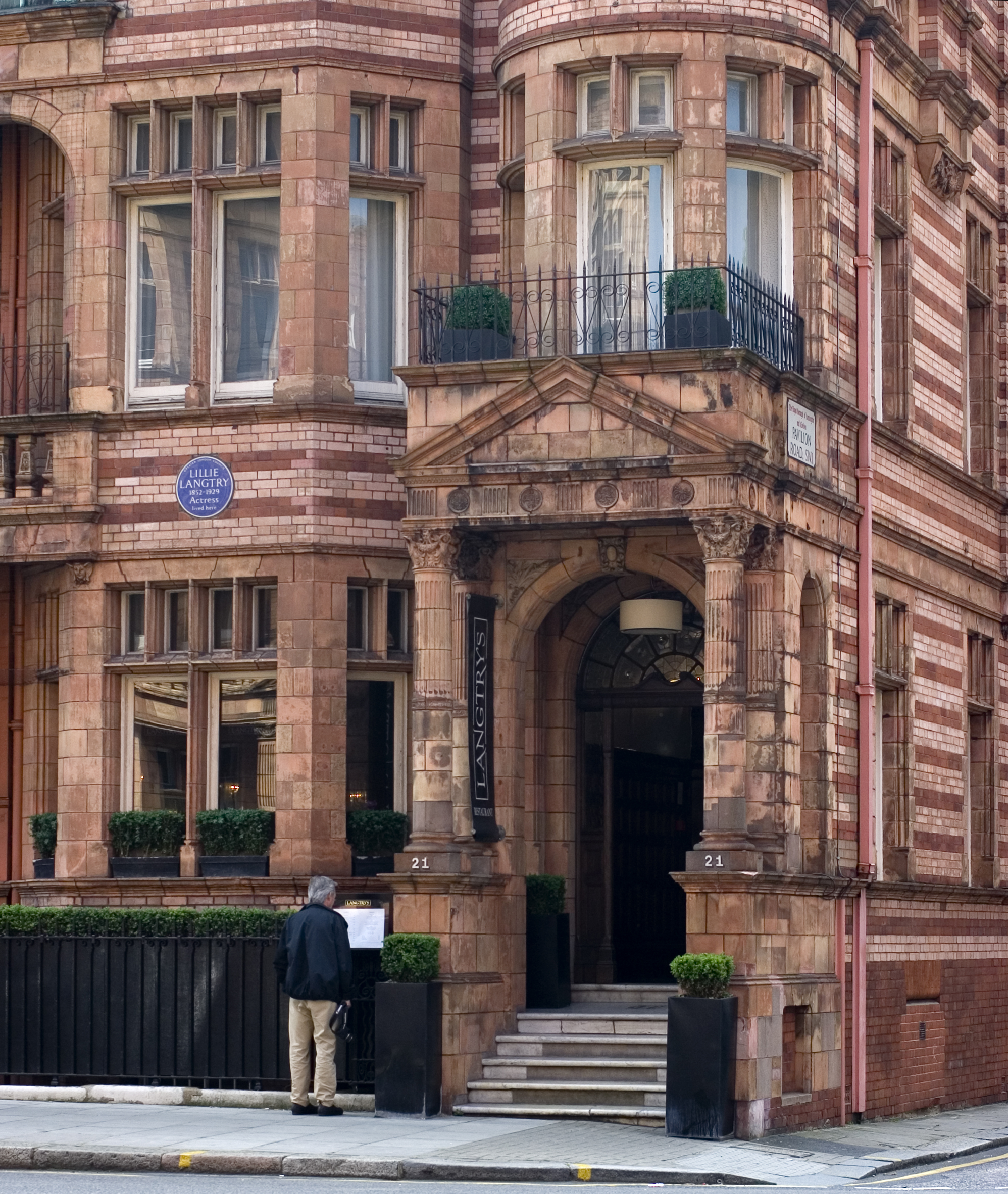
Langtry's former home, 21 Pont Street, Chelsea, London

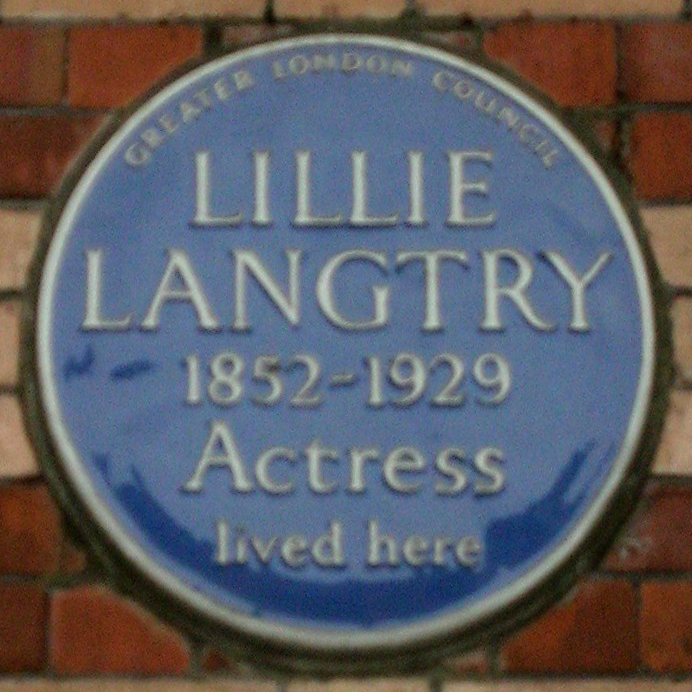
Commemorative blue plaque at the Pont Street address

=== Residences and historical namesakes ===
When first married (1874), Edward and Lillie Langtry had a property called Cliffe Lodge in Southampton, Hampshire. In 1876 they rented an apartment in Eaton Place, Belgravia, London. From early 1878 they lived at 17 Norfolk Street (now 19 Dunraven Street) in Mayfair, London. Langtry lived at 21 Pont Street, London, from 1890 to 1897, and had with her eight servants at the 1891 census. Although from 1895 the building was operated as the Cadogan Hotel, she would stay in her former bedroom there. A blue plaque (which erroneously states that she was born in 1852) on the hotel commemorates this, and the hotel's restaurant is named 'The LaLee' in her honour.

A short walk from Pont Street was a house at number 2 Cadogan Place where she lived in 1899. From 1886 to 1894, she owned a house in Manhattan at 362 West 23rd Street, a gift from Frederick Gebhard.

Langtry's London address from 1916 until at least 1920 was Cornwall Lodge, Allsop Place, Regent's Park. She gave this address when sailing on the liner St Paul across the Atlantic in August 1916, and the 1920 London electoral register has de Bathe, Emilie Charlotte (Lady), listed at the same address. A letter sold at auction in 2014 from Langtry to Dr. Harvey dated 1918 is also headed with this address. Langtry was a cousin of local politician Philip Le Breton, pioneer for the preservation of Hampstead Heath, whose wife was Anna Letitia Aikin.

There are two bars in New York City devoted to the memory of Lillie Langtry, operating under the title Lillie's Victorian Establishment. Judge Roy Bean named the saloon, in Pecos, Texas, The Jersey Lily, which also served as the judge's courthouse, for her, in Langtry, Texas (named after the unrelated engineer George Langtry).

=== Spurious associations ===
==== Bournemouth ====
In 1938 the new owners of the Red House at 26 Derby Road, Bournemouth, which had been built in 1877 by the widowed women's rights campaigner and temperance activist Emily Langton Langton, converted the large house into a hotel, the Manor Heath Hotel, and advertised it as having been built for Lillie Langtry by the Prince of Wales, believing that the inscription 'E.L.L. 1877' in one of the rooms related to Lillie Langtry. A plaque was later placed on the hotel by Bournemouth Council repeating the assertion, and in the late 1970s the hotel was renamed Langtry Manor. However, despite the hotel's claims and local legend, no actual association between Langtry and the house ever existed and the Prince never visited it.

==== South Hampstead ====
On 2 April 1965 the Evening Standard reported an interview with Electra Yaras (born ca. 1922), leaseholder and resident of Leighton House, 103 Alexandra Road, South Hampstead, who claimed in the interview that Langtry had lived in the house and regularly entertained the Prince of Wales there. Yaras claimed that she herself had been visited in the house several times by Langtry's ghost.

On 11 April 1971 The Hampstead News said that the house had been built for Langtry by Lord Leighton. These claims by Yaras and later by The Hampstead News were made in order to suggest an historical importance for the house and support its preservation from the demolition which had been originally ordered in 1965 and revived in 1971. The claims were supported in 1971 by actress Adrienne Corri, who lived nearby and signed a petition, and were publicised in The Times on 8 October 1971 and The Daily Telegraph on 9 October 1971. They were given further publicity by Anita Leslie in 1973 in a book on the Marlborough House set.

The house was nevertheless demolished in 1971 to make way for the Alexandra Road Estate.

In 2021, published research revealed that the house had been built in the 1860s by Samuel Litchfield and was likely named after his wife's birthplace of Leighton Buzzard. Lengthy research into local records by Dick Weindling and Marianne Colloms revealed no connection whatever with Langtry.

The persistence of the myth, propounded in a time when stories about the royal family were easy to publicise and received no critical or substantiating research, resulted in Langtry's name still being in use in some place names and locales in the South Hampstead area. These include Langtry Road off Kilburn Priory; Langtry Walk in the Alexandra Road Estate; and the Lillie Langtry pub at 121 Abbey Road (defunct since late 2022), built in 1969 to replace The Princess of Wales hotel, and briefly called The Cricketers from 2007 to 2011. The mythologising also includes The Lillie Langtry pub at 19 Lillie Road in Fulham—the road actually took its name from local landowner John Scott Lillie.

== Steam yacht White Ladye ==
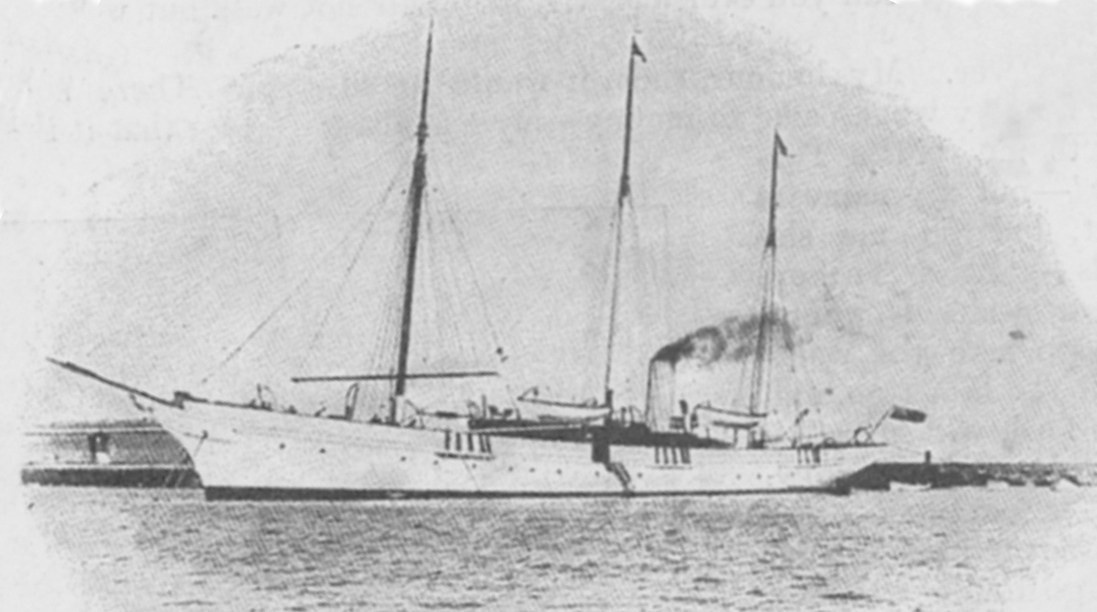
The White Ladye

Langtry owned a luxury steam auxiliary yacht called White Ladye from 1891 to 1897. The yacht was built in 1891 for Lord Asburton by Ramage & Ferguson of Leith, Scotland, from a design by W. C. Storey. She had three masts, was 204 feet in length and 27 feet in breadth and was powered by a 142 hp steam engine. She had originally been named Ladye Mabel.

In 1893, Ogden Goelet leased the vessel from Langtry and used it until his death in 1897. Langtry put the White Ladye up for auction in November 1897 at the Mart, Tokenhouse Yard, London. It was sold to Scottish entrepreneur John Lawson Johnston, the creator of Bovril. He owned it until his death on board in 1900. From 1902 to 1903, the yacht was recorded in the Lloyd's Yacht Register as being owned by shipbuilder William Cresswell Gray, Tunstall Manor, West Hartlepool, and remained so until 1915. Following this the Lloyd's Register records that she became adapted as French trawler La Champagne based in Fécamp, northwest France; she was broken up in 1935.

== Bibliography ==
- Langtry, Lillie, The Days I Knew(registration required), 1925 autobiography).
- Langtry, Emilie Charlotte. The life of Mrs. Langtry, the Jersey Lily, and queen of the stage, 1882. Pinder & Howes Leeds
- Langtry, Lillie. All at Sea (novel) 1909.
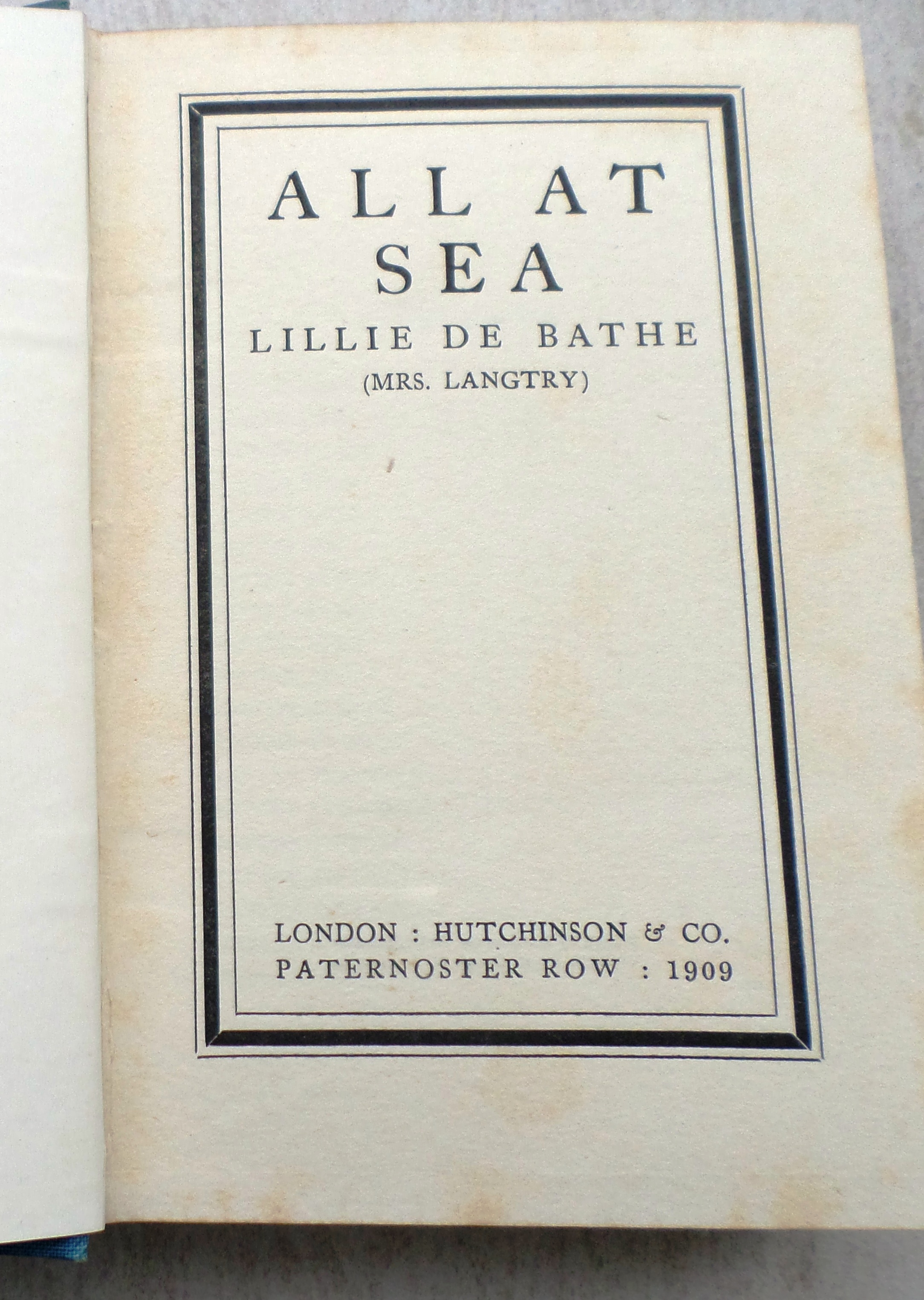
All at Sea, Langtry's only novel

== See also ==
- Academy of Music/Riviera Theatre
- English royal mistress
