= Edward Langtry =

Lillie Langtry's husband (1847–1897)

Edward Langtry (1847–1897) married Emilie Charlotte Le Breton on the island of Jersey in 1874. She later took to the stage as actress Lillie Langtry, and became involved in a relationship with Albert Edward, Prince of Wales. Langtry and his wife eventually separated and she obtained a divorce in 1897. Langtry died from a brain haemorrhage in the same year after a fall during a steamer crossing from Belfast to Liverpool.

There have been numerous biographies about Lillie Langtry (she also wrote her own autobiography), but little has been written about her first husband Edward (Ned) Langtry. What has been written often paints him in a negative light. He has been referred to as "a colourless sportsman"; "a pudgy chap, his weak mouth overhung with a walrus moustache, and his conversation powers were limited"; "petulantly determined on his own importance......he was weak and indolent and also, surprisingly shy"; "a meek, weak husband and no money"; "uneasily complaisant husband".

If these descriptions are accurate, it is difficult to understand why a woman as gifted as Lillie would marry a man with such shortcomings. In her memoirs The Days I Knew she explains that Edward Langtry was an extremely shy person, and had spent his life since leaving Oxford in outdoor country sports. In London he felt "quite like a fish out of water" and this may explain his difficulty in conversation and his lack of social grace, and possibly why so many people had such a poor opinion of him. In 1877 Edward and Lillie spent a month in the Perth area of Scotland as the guests of Effie and John Everett Millais. It was here that Edward was at his most relaxed, salmon fishing with Millais, and appeased with the absence of crowds. A vacation later described by Lillie as a "delightful month".

Some conflicting information about Edward Langtry life originated in Lillie Langtry's memoirs. In this she claims that Edward's father started the steam ship crossings between Belfast and Scotland, whereas these were started by his grandfather, George Langtry. She also wrote that when they married he was about thirty years of age although he was actually twenty-six.

== Family background ==
=== Edward's grandfather George Langtry ===
Langtry lived the life of a gentleman on the money that came from the mercantile and shipping business created by his grandfather, George Langtry (1764–1846). He had opened a general store in Belfast in Ulster in about 1786 and later organised a shipping line between Belfast and England, both for cargo and passengers. The early crossings were under sail, but later steam powered ships were used and Langtry commissioned the first steam ship to be built in Ireland called Belfast. The mercantile business was initially named George Langtry & Co. and from about 1828 the shipping company became Langtrys & Herdman, under the management of William Herdman (1777–1855), plus two of George's sons - Robert and George Jr. In about 1810, George Sr. purchased a large house and grounds on the northern outskirts of Belfast called Fortwilliam. This remained the family home until about 1858, when the mansion and 161 acres were sold for housing development. Another large estate they held was Drumaderragh House, near Ballyclare in County Antrim. This was sold in about 1900 and is now the residence of Lord Glentoran.

In 1794, George married Fanny Callwell (1772–1825), whose Ulster-Scots family had arrived in Ireland from Scotland at the beginning of the 17th century as part of the Plantation of Ulster. Her mother was Catherine Magee, sister of printer, publisher and Belfast book seller, James Magee (c. 1707–1797).

=== Edward's parents ===
Edward Langtry was born in County Antrim in Ulster, the northern province in Ireland, on 14 February 1847. His mother was Eliza Ray (1825-1854) and his father Robert Langtry (1800–1855), who was the eldest son of George Langty Sr. When old enough, Robert entered the family mercantile and shipping business, but he also had outside interests in natural history, horticulture and yachting. He recorded observations from the environment and passed these on to his cousin, naturalist William Thompson, with any specimen he felt were of interest. Robert's brother Richard (1810-1858) also helped and many of their contributions were credited in Thompson's Natural History of Ireland vols. 1 to 4. Robert's love of gardening was reflected in horticultural society competitions he entered with his plants, cut flowers, vegetable and fruit, often getting first or second prizes.

In 1848/49 changes occurred in the family business. George Sr. had died in 1846 and Robert's brother George Jr. died in 1849. Robert left the Belfast home and moved with his family to "a charming reed-thatched Regency pavilion" called Ardimersey Cottage on Islay, the southernmost island of the Inner Hebrides of Scotland. At the time of the move Robert and Eliza had two children, daughter Emily (1846–1896), and Edward. Two other children were later born in Scotland: Ida (1849–1919) who was born in Troon and Fanny (1850–1888) born on Islay; both girls were baptised on Islay.

Islay was owned by Walter Frederick Campbell, but he became bankrupt and the management of the island was placed in the hands of John Ramsay, who was a distiller, merchant and politician. A buyer for the island was eventually found in 1853, who was wealthy businessman James Morrison. He had an agreement with Ramsay that he would sell a section of Islay to him including the cottage and land where the Langtry family were living. Some years later Ramsey made Ardimersey Cottage his home.

This move of the Langtry family from Belfast to Islay coincided with the Irish Great Famine that devastated many parts of Ireland between 1845 and 1851. During this period the population of the country fell by nearly 20%, although the loss in Co. Antrim was slightly lower at 15%. Many of the malnourished people travelling to Belfast in search of shelter, food and employment were afflicted with diseases such as dysentery, relapsing fever and typhus. This led to a major outbreak of typus in Belfast and it was estimated that 1 in 5 people in the area became infected. In the summer of 1847 the number of deaths in Belfast public institutions were averaging between 70 and 80 per week. Many others died in their dwellings or were found dead on the streets. The burial grounds were filled to overflowing with graves being reused to within a few inches of the surface, leading to infestation from rodents. In 1849 Belfast suffered another epidemic, this time from cholera that led to the death of about 1300 people.

In 1852 the Langtrys had a house guest staying with them on Islay at their Ardimersay Cottage (spellings vary). He was Nathaniel Alexander, the former member of parliament for County Antrim. According to newspaper reports of the time he had been suffering for two weeks with “water on the chest” but he was only 38 years of age so there was little concern for his health. However, on 5 January 1853 he died in the cottage. Further tragedies followed; in September 1854 Robert's wife, Eliza, died on Islay and within 7 months Robert died in the Ardimersey Cottage. At the age of eight Edward Langtry, and his three sisters aged nine, six and five were orphaned. Their financial affairs came under the care of trustees and executors: Henry Fulton, William McEwen and their uncle, Richard Langtry. At the time of his death Robert Langtry owned numerous properties in Co. Antrim and Co. Down. Details of these were recorded in 1862 and 1864 in the Griffith's Valuation and can be viewed in summary on the AskAboutIreland.ie web site.

== Aftermath ==
Any hope that the orphaned children would grow up with their uncle Richard's family at Fortwilliam came to an end when he died in October 1858 aged 48. He was the fourth son of George Langtry Sr. and within months of his death the Fortwilliam Mansion and estate was put up for sale by the fifth, and only surviving son, Charles Langtry. He had been in business with Richard, running the scheduled Belfast to Liverpool steamer line R & C Langtry. He transferred their two ships, Waterloo and Blenheim, to the Belfast Steamer Company in 1859 and in July 1862 he died in Drumaderragh House.

The death of George Langtry's sons at such early ages created serious difficulties. Only one daughter appears to have lived much longer, she was Maria (Langtry) Waddell, the grandmother of botanist Coslett Herbert Waddell. The financial affairs of Eliza and Robert's four children remained in the control of the trustees until they had reached their age of majority. The 1861 census for Wonston, Hampshire (taken 7 April 1861) indicates that the children, Emily, Edward, Ida and Fanny were "boarders" in the rectory of Rev. Alexander Robert Charles Dallas (1791– 1869). He had helped found the Society for Irish Church Missions to the Roman Catholics in 1849.

== Yachting ==
Edward Langtry's father had been a yachtsman, and his last yacht was the 34 ton, Queen of the Isles, placed on sale after his death in 1855 at Bowling Harbour on the Clyde, Glasgow. In 1868, when Edward Langtry reached the age of 21, he was in the position to purchase his own yacht, a sailing schooner called Red Gauntlet. The vessel was of 147 tons, about 100 ft in length and 19 ft in beam. Built by Inman of Lymington for George Powell Haughton and launched in 1862. The saloon was 18 ft by 15 ft, and a later description said that the yacht could take seven passengers with a crew of eight. The yacht had at least one additional owner before Langtry, he was J Nolan-Ferrall. Other yachts owned by Langtry at this time were Ildegonda, of 15 tons. and later a 60-ton yawl named Gertrude.

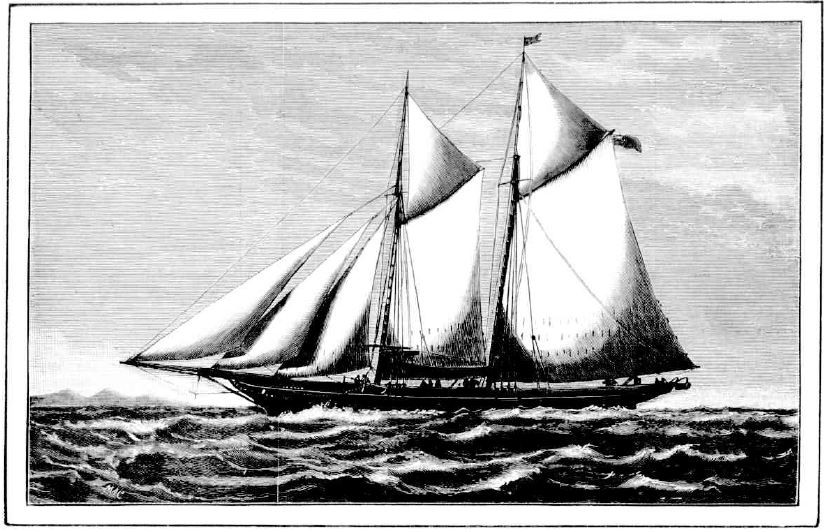
Yacht Red Gauntlet owned by Edward "Ned" Langtry, first husband of actress Lillie (le Breton) Langtry

Langtry made extensive use of the Red Gauntlet, starting in 1868 by sailing to Dartmouth for the Royal Regatta and then to Dublin. He married in March the following year to Jane Frances Price; in May the newlyweds sailed to the Isle of Man and then on to Islay. From there to Oban and through the Caledonian Canal heading to Norway; by August they were back at the Dartmouth Royal Regatta. In October the Langtrys and Red Gauntlet were reported as being in Saint Peter Port, Guernsey, returning to Jersey. In March 1870, the Red Gauntlet with the Langtry family were reported as being in Malta having returned for Syracuse. From that period and into 1871 Edward was involved with domestic regattas racing both Red Gauntlet and Ildegonda. In September, Langtry sailed for Jersey, where in October his wife Jane died at the home of her parents, aged just 21.

During 1872 the yachting press periodically reported that Langtry was taking part in domestic regattas in Ildegonda and in a cutter named Satellite. In December 1872, when most yachts would have been laid up for the season, the yachting correspondent for Bell's Life in London reported that Langtry and Red Gauntlet were heading for St Petersburg, but if the port was closed he would over-winter in Holland for the shooting. In 1873 Langtry was associated with another small yacht (18 tons) called Marguerite and it was reported that Ildegonda had been sold to a Mr Gordon. On 9 March 1874, Langtry married Emilie Charlotte Le Breton in Jersey. She became known as actress Lillie Langtry and wrote a book about her life in which she said that her family insisted Edward Langtry must cut back on his expenditure. This included his yachting activities, and the lack of any mention of his name in the yachting press after 1874 does indicate that he complied. The Red Gauntlet was sold to B.C. Greenhill of Knowle Hall, Bridgewater, in April 1874, less than one month after the couple had married. The yawl Gertrude remained in the ownership of Langtry for the 1874 sailing season. She was sold to Henry W. Acland at the end of 1874.

== Jane Frances Price ==
Edward Langtry's first wife was Jane Frances Price (1850–1871). They married in St Helier, Jersey, on 10 March 1869; she was 18 and he was 22 years of age. Her parents, Elizabeth Pratt Lepper (1822–1902) and Francis Price (1804–1894), were residents of Jersey but both had been born in Ulster in the north of Ireland, she in County Antrim and he in County Down. Coming from the Belfast area, they would have been aware of the Langtry family background in mercantile and shipping. Before he retired, Francis Price worked as a civil servant in Ceylon, and like Edward Langtry's father had an interest in natural history. Both contributed specimens to the Natural History and Philosophical Society in Belfast and it seems likely that they were acquainted.

On 18 November 1873, Jane's younger sister, Elizabeth Anne Price (1855–1940), married William Inglis Le Breton (1845–1924), brother of Emilie Charlotte Le Breton (1853–1929). He was an army officer attached to the Indian Staff Corps, Public Works Department, Bombay (Mumbai), described as a comptroller, dealing with financial and compliance matters. He had returned to Britain from India in 1873 to marry, but it seems that Elizabeth Anne Price was not his first choice of bride. In June and July 1873, banns of marriage were read in St Mary's Church, Battersea, announcing the forthcoming marriage of William Inglis Le Breton to Martha Mary Elizabeth Pickering. She was the daughter of railway engineer Edward Pickering, who was living in Jersey with his family whilst he constructed the Jersey Railway from St Aubin to St Catherine's. Edward Pickering was from a family of engineers, who with his brothers had constructed railways in various parts of the world, including South America and South Africa. His sister was Alice Tredwell, who had managed the construction of a section of the Great Indian Peninsula Railway in an area of India where William Inglis Le Breton was stationed. Unfortunately for Martha and William, just as their banns were being read her father was declared bankrupt and their wedding was cancelled.

== Emilie Charlotte Le Breton ==
Langtry married Emilie Charlotte Le Breton on Jersey on 9 March 1874. Her father, William Corbet Le Breton (1815–1888), was the Dean of Jersey and it was he who performed the ceremony. The couple first met at a ball organised by Edward Langtry - only about 5 months before they got married. Emilie had been nicknamed Lillie since she was young on account of her skin being "unusually white" and she was in future referred to as Lillie Langtry (or Lily).

In 1876, through a family connection, they were invited to an afternoon tea at Lord Ranelagh's and later an evening party at Lady Sebright's. It was there that her looks and personality attracted attention and led to further invitations and a meeting with Albert Edward, Prince of Wales ('Bertie'). Lillie was also asked to sit for portraits, including one by John Everett Millais. Her relationship with the Prince developed and attracted the attention of the gossip columnists. This eventually led to a libel court case in 1879 after Adolphus Rosenberg claimed in Town Talk that Edward Langtry had petitioned for divorce, naming H.R.H. The Prince of Wales, Lord Lonsdale and Lord Londesborough as the co-respondents. The article also claimed that to stop the divorce action, arrangements were made to appoint Edward Langtry to a diplomatic post abroad. Rosenberg pleaded guilty to publishing the libels, but not to knowing them to be false. Edward Langtry was called as a witness and denied the claims made in the article. He said that he had always lived on terms of affection with his wife. The case went against Rosenberg and he was sentenced to serve 18 months in prison. Oddly, when this trial had first gone to court, it was not about the Langtry libel, but involved unrelated articles published by Rosenburg involving Mrs Cornwallis-West. The solicitor acting for the Prince of Wales, George Lewis, orchestrated events so that Rosenberg also faced the charge of false and defamatory libel related to the Langtry article. The appearance in court of the extremely shy Edward Langtry as a witness must have been a very uncomfortable experience, and he probably felt resentment for being placed in such a position.

The Langtrys started to spend freely and were living on credit. When Lillie fell out of favour with the Prince of Wales, the creditors started to demand payment and bankruptcy loomed. Edward's income came from Irish properties left to him by his father. These included land in Parkgate, Co. Antrim, of about 340 acres. Although the value of the land had risen over time, the rents had not and some of the tenant demands for repairs to property were actually costing Langtry money. He visited the area to take personal control of the situation but returned to London having apparently come off worse in the negotiations with his tenants. Up to this time Edward had handled money matters for the two of them, but these setbacks made Lillie determined to have more control of her destiny.

In 1880, Lillie discovered that she had become pregnant after a relationship with another man. She knew Edward would realise the child was not his, so a subterfuge was devised to get him out of the country while she travelled to France to have the child in secret. To achieve this he was commissioned to inspect and value some property in America belonging to Adelaide Neilson. He left England for America in December 1880 but completed the work early. A series of telegrams and letters were then sent to him from England to delay his return until he eventually got back in April 1881. Lillie had a baby girl on 8 March 1881, named Jeanne Marie, who was taken to Jersey to be looked after by Lillie's mother. Edward claimed in a letter published in 1897 that he knew nothing of the birth of this child. The marriage between Edward and Lillie was now in trouble; they argued, she was seeing another man and he was drinking too much. After 7 years of marriage they parted and Lillie began her acting career.

== Final years ==
=== Divorce ===
After they parted, Edward Langtry slipped into obscurity, and was only occasionally mentioned in the press. He spent about ten years in Holyhead on Anglesey where he kept his links with water sporting activities, fishing and sailing. The 1891 census recorded him living at Cellar Farm, Aberffraw, Anglesey, Wales. One story in the newspapers said that he sometimes crewed for the local lifeboat as an oarsman. From about 1893 until his death he was living in Southampton, Hampshire, in an apartment at 9 Queen's Terrace, run by Ellen and Cornelius Collins. This address is located a short distance from the docks and the ocean liner terminal. On 13 May 1897, Lillie Langtry obtained a divorce from Edward in the county court of Lakeport, California. This was her third attempt and Edward had always resisted saying that "she shall never untie the knot that her father tied at the altar". However, on this occasion the judge, Richard W. Crump (1828-1903), decided that the summons had been duly served on Edward Langtry, and because he had failed to answer he was in default. When told of the judge's decision, Edward responded by saying that if she tried to remarry in Britain she would be committing bigamy.

=== Death ===
Cornelius Collins attended the inquest, held for Edward Langtry at the Chester Asylum, where he identified the body. He gave evidence and said that Langtry had money on him when he left Southampton, having just received a cheque for £25 from the solicitor, George Lewis. This was a payment made to him every three months by Lewis on behalf of Lillie Langtry. Greenwood, who was a 38 year old corn miller born in the Burnley area, had not attended the first inquest and the coroner adjourned until he could be summoned to give evidence. When he appeared he corroborated the evidence given by Collins, adding that Langtry had appeared despondent for several months following Lillie Langtry's American divorce. On the journey to Belfast he said that Edward was not well, could not eat and when he tried felt sick. He had not been with him when he fell, but he heard the noise and with the steward, found Edward bleeding profusely from a head wound. The steward administered first-aid and bandaged the wound, and when the ship docked Greenwood went with Langtry to the hospital. Edward Langtry is buried in Overleigh Cemetery, Chester, Cheshire.

Various rumours at the time of Edward's death circulated, included that he had either committed suicide or had been murdered by thugs hired by Lillie. One newspaper report even quoted a policeman who was supposed to have heard Edward say that he had been attacked. However, the policeman later denied having said this. Another unsubstantiated account was that since his separation from Lillie he followed her but never approached, instead asking railway porters about how she looked and how she was dressed. He responded to some of the rumours and allegations in a letter published a few months before his death in the New York Journal.

=== Irish property ===
In 1928, tenanted properties in Northern Ireland were compulsorily purchased under the Northern Ireland Land Act, 1925. This was passed after the Partition of Ireland, with the purpose of transferring certain lands from owners to tenants, the owners being compensated with the purchase price or bond. Lillie made claim to those lands connected to Edward Langtry's estate, stating that she, as his widow, was his representative. This was connected with a clause in Edward Langtry's will made when he married Lillie, gifting his Irish properties to her should he die.

=== Family ===
Of Edward's sisters: the eldest, Emily remained unmarried and died in Devon. Indications from census records are that she lived with her sister, Fanny, and her husband, George Langtry (1851-1889), who was her cousin being the son of Richard Langtry. The last sister, Ida, married a doctor from the Isle of Wight named Alfred Hollis (1846-1915) and these last two were the only members of Edward's family at his funeral.

Note: Dr Alfred Hollis was in attendance on Alfred, Lord Tennyson, who had a house on the Isle of Wight.

=== End of Red Gauntlet ===
The schooner, Red Gauntlet, was taken to Australia in 1880 on a world cruise by its then owner, Cecil Charles Balfour, brother of politician Arthur Balfour. Whilst there Cecil was killed in a riding accident and the Gauntlet was sold to an Australian owner. In 1887 the vessel was lost after grounding on a reef.
