= Pears (soap) =

Brand of soap

- Pears brand logo
- Product type: Soap, Face wash
- Current owner: Unilever
- Produced by: Hindustan Unilever
- Country: London, United Kingdom
- Introduced: 1807; 219 years ago
- Related brands: Lifebuoy, Lux, Dove
- Markets: United Kingdom, India, Sri Lanka, Nigeria
- Previous owners: A. & F. Pears Ltd. (1917)
- Registered as a trademark in: List: Australia; Bahrain; Chile; Denmark; Estonia; Georgia; India; Israel; Jordan; Malaysia; Morocco; New Zealand; Philippines; Singapore; United States; Czech Republic
- Website: All brands | Unilever

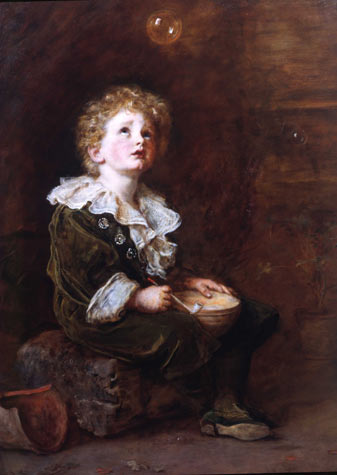
Bubbles by John Everett Millais. Pears' most famous advertisement, Thomas Barratt purchased the painting in August 1890.

Pears Glycerin soap is a British brand of soap first produced and sold in 1807 by Andrew Pears, at a factory just off Oxford Street in London. It was the world's first mass-market translucent soap. Under the stewardship of advertising pioneer Thomas J. Barratt, A. & F. Pears initiated several innovations in sales and marketing. English actress and socialite Lillie Langtry was recruited to become the poster-girl for Pears in 1882, and in doing so, she became the first celebrity to endorse a commercial product.

Lever Brothers, now Unilever, acquired A. & F. Pears in 1917. Products under the Pears brand are currently manufactured in India and Saudi Arabia for global distribution.

== History ==
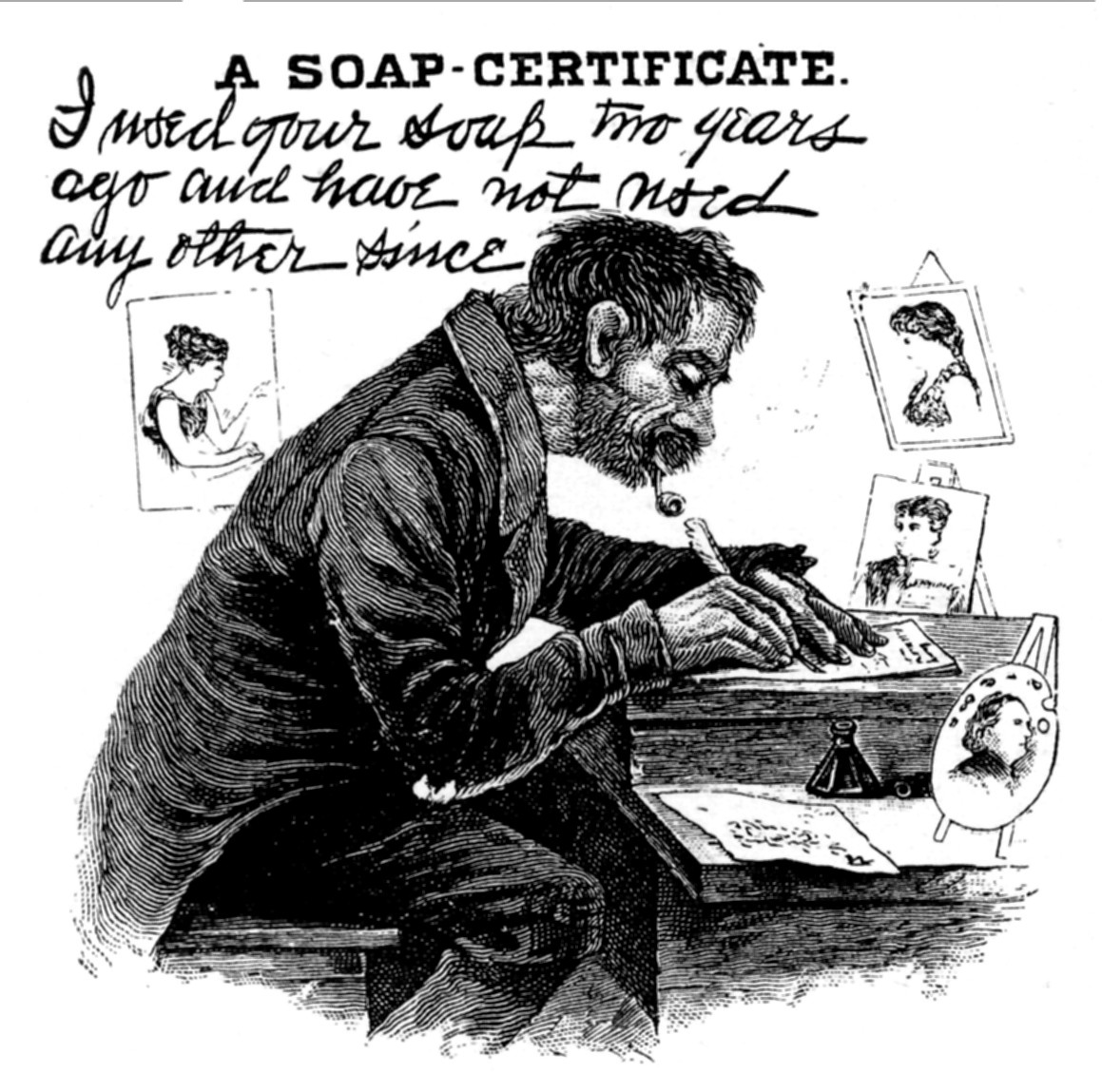
Parody of Barratt's advertising

Andrew Pears, the son of a farmer, was born around 1770 in Cornwall and moved from his native Mevagissey to London around 1787. He completed his apprenticeship in 1789, established a barber's shop in Gerrard Street in Soho, and began to produce cosmetic products. At that time, Soho was a high-end residential area, and Pears' clientele included many wealthy socialites who took pride in their appearance. The fashion among the wealthy of the period was pristine white complexions; tanned faces were associated with those who laboured outdoors. Pears found that his powders and creams were frequently being used to cover up damage caused by the harshness of the soaps and other beauty products that were in general use at the time, many of which contained arsenic or lead. Pears began experimenting with soap purification and eventually produced a gentle soap based on glycerine and other natural products. The clarity of the soap gave it a novel, transparent appearance, which provided a marketing advantage. To add to the appeal, Pears gave the soap an aroma reminiscent of an English garden. It was first sold in London in 1807.

In 1835, when his grandson, Francis Pears, joined the business, the firm was renamed A. & F. Pears. After three years, Andrew retired and left Francis in charge. At the Great Exhibition of 1851, A. & F. Pears was awarded the prize medal for soap. Production moved to Isleworth in 1862. 23-year-old Thomas J. Barratt, sometimes referred to as the father of modern advertising, was appointed bookkeeper in 1864. The next year, Francis' son, Andrew, joined A. & F. Pears as joint proprietor and ran the Isleworth factory. That same year, Thomas married Mary Pears, Francis's eldest daughter, and was appointed to run the administration in London. During the nineteenth century, Pears built a large market for its soap in the United States.

A. & F. Pears was successfully floated as a public company in May 1892, with Robert William Perks managing the float process. The Financial Times reported enthusiastically on the public offer: "Despite the title of one of the firm's most popular advertisements, A. and F. Pears Ltd. is not likely to be ranked as one of the 'Bubbles' of the century; rather will the investor rush for an allotment of the shares, and not be happy till he gets it".

Following Barratt's death in April 1914, Lever Brothers took a major shareholding in A. & F. Pears. The takeover process was completed in 1920 and marketing and other secondary functions moved to Port Sunlight, Cheshire, but production continued at Isleworth.

In the mid to late 1950s, each batch of soap, about 12 a day, was tested to ensure the absence of excess alkali or free fatty acid. Production moved to Port Sunlight in the 1960s, when Unilever, successor to Lever Brothers, set up a cosmetic development laboratory on the Isleworth site. A major fire at the site destroyed the original factory.

Pears soap is now made in India by Hindustan Unilever, a company in which Unilever now has a 67 percent share.

== Manufacture ==
A close-up of Pears soap

Pears soap was made using a process entirely different from other soaps. A mixture of tallow and other fats was saponified by an alkali. This is currently caustic soda (sodium hydroxide) since the ingredients list shows sodium salts of fatty acids, but a chemist reports that in the 1960s, caustic potash (potassium hydroxide) was used. It has not been possible to determine what was used in the early days of the product, as the writings of Francis Pears mention only alkali in industrial methylated spirits. After saponification, the resulting glycerol was left in the batch. Batches were made not in huge pans but in small kettle-like vessels. As soon as the translucent amber liquid had cooled enough to solidify, it was extruded into opaque oval bars cut into bath- or toilet-weight tablets, ready to begin their long spell in the drying rooms (ovens). The hot liquid soap fresh from the vessel had a total fatty matter (TFM) of 45% compared with the TFMs of 70–80% usual in soaps made by the conventional method. The TFM increased considerably as the alcohol content fell during drying. The concave shape of the soap is formed by shrinkage while the soap is drying and is not due to deliberate moulding.

The entire Pears plant was a small, almost self-contained annex at the rear of the administration block. It was run by a handful of staff, who not only had experience with the specialised process but had developed immunity to the effects of breathing the alcohol-laden atmosphere in the building. Bars of soap produced in the factory come in two sizes: 75 g and 125 g. The soap comes in three colours: classic amber, green, and mint (blue). Each variety has a unique aroma. The soap now comes in two new sizes: 69 g and 119 g.

== Marketing ==
The first of the Pears marketing campaigns used Florentine artist, Giovanni Focardi's statuette, You dirty boy!, commissioned by A. & F. Pears and exhibited at the Exposition Universelle de Paris in 1878. The statue was so popular that Pears also purchased the copyright. These reproductions, intended for shop counter displays, were made in terracotta, plaster, and metal.

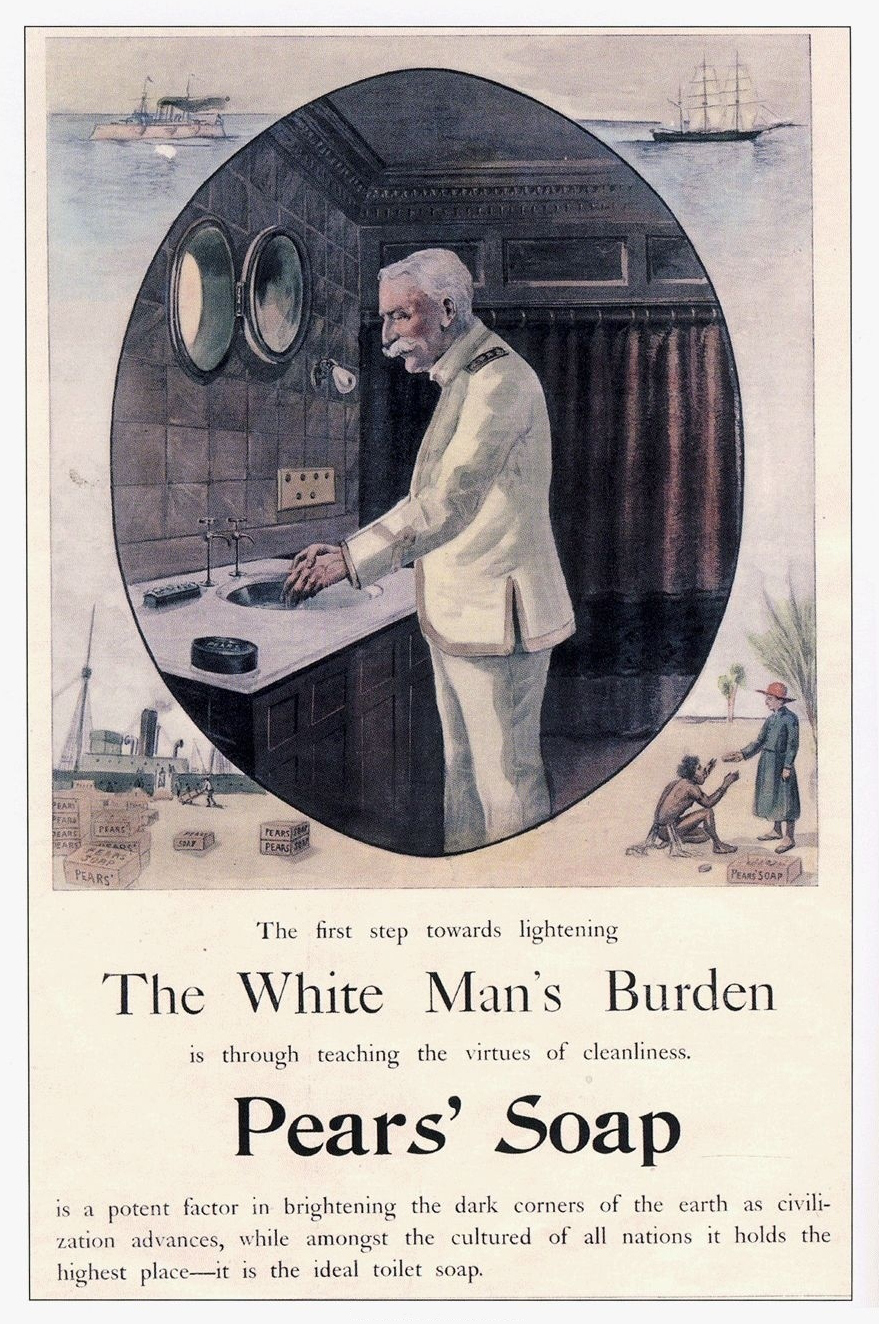
Advertisement for Pears soap from the 1890s promoting cleanliness as "a first step towards lightening the White Man's Burden".

From the late 19th century, Pears' Soap became closely associated with early developments in brand advertising, particularly under the direction of Barratt. In 1886, Barratt purchased John Everett Millais' painting Bubbles, a portrait of Millais' grandson. He reproduced the image with the addition of a bar of soap and the Pears name. The resulting advertisement became one of the most recognized examples of "artistic" advertising—a trend in the 1880s that involved reproductions of works by Royal Academicians to lend products respectability and appeal to middle-income consumers. As with many other brands at the time, at the beginning of the 20th century, Pears also adopted marketing themes aligned with imperial ideologies, using its product as a sign of the prevailing European concept of the "civilizing mission" of empire and trade, in which the soap stood for progress.

In the 1860s, Barratt devised a marketing campaign using French coins stamped with "Pears' Soap" to circulate the brand name through everyday transactions. He imported 10-centime French coins, which were roughly the same size and shape as the British penny of the time. The coins circulated in Britain after Barratt reportedly used them to pay his staff, allowing the brand name to spread throughout society as the coins changed hands. The loophole was eventually closed when British law was amended to prevent the use of foreign coinage as legal tender.

In 1882, socialite Lillie Langtry became the first woman to negotiate a lucrative endorsement deal when Pears' Soap paid her £132 to sign the statement, "Since using Pears' Soap for the hands and complexion I have discarded all others", recommending their product. Langtry later claimed that she had named her fee to match her weight at the time, giving rise to the popular phrase that she was paid "pound for pound", while other accounts suggest she may not have been paid for the endorsement. Pears' Victorian trade cards soon after included testimonials from Italian opera singer Adelina Patti, American actress Mary Anderson, and American clergyman Henry Ward Beecher.

Between 1891 and 1925, the company issued the Pears' Annual at Christmastime. The annuals were heavily illustrated, with a selection of Christmas features and stories, and published predominantly in large tabloid format. Another advertisement vehicle for Pears was the 1,000-page Pears' Cyclopaedia, a one-volume almanac that offered "A Mass of Curious and Useful Information about Things that everyone Ought to know in Commerce, History, Science, Religion, Literature and other Topics of Ordinary Conversation" for a shilling. Established in December 1897, it was sold to Pelham Books in 1958, then Penguin in 1988, and ceased publication in 2017 after 125 years in print. In 1958, the annual "Miss Pears" competition began, with the offer of £1,000 prize money, and the winner's image to be used on soapboxes and print advertisements for the year. Until the company ended the event in 1997, parents entered their young daughters, many aged just three or four, resulting in 25,000 entries every year.

Since 2003, British company Cert Brands has been responsible for marketing and distributing Pears soap.

== Gallery ==
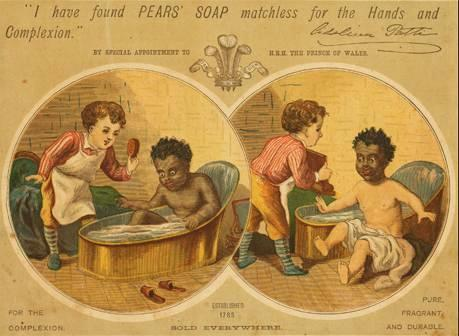
The original Pears soap advert based on the fable "Washing the Blackamoor white", published in The Graphic for Christmas 1884

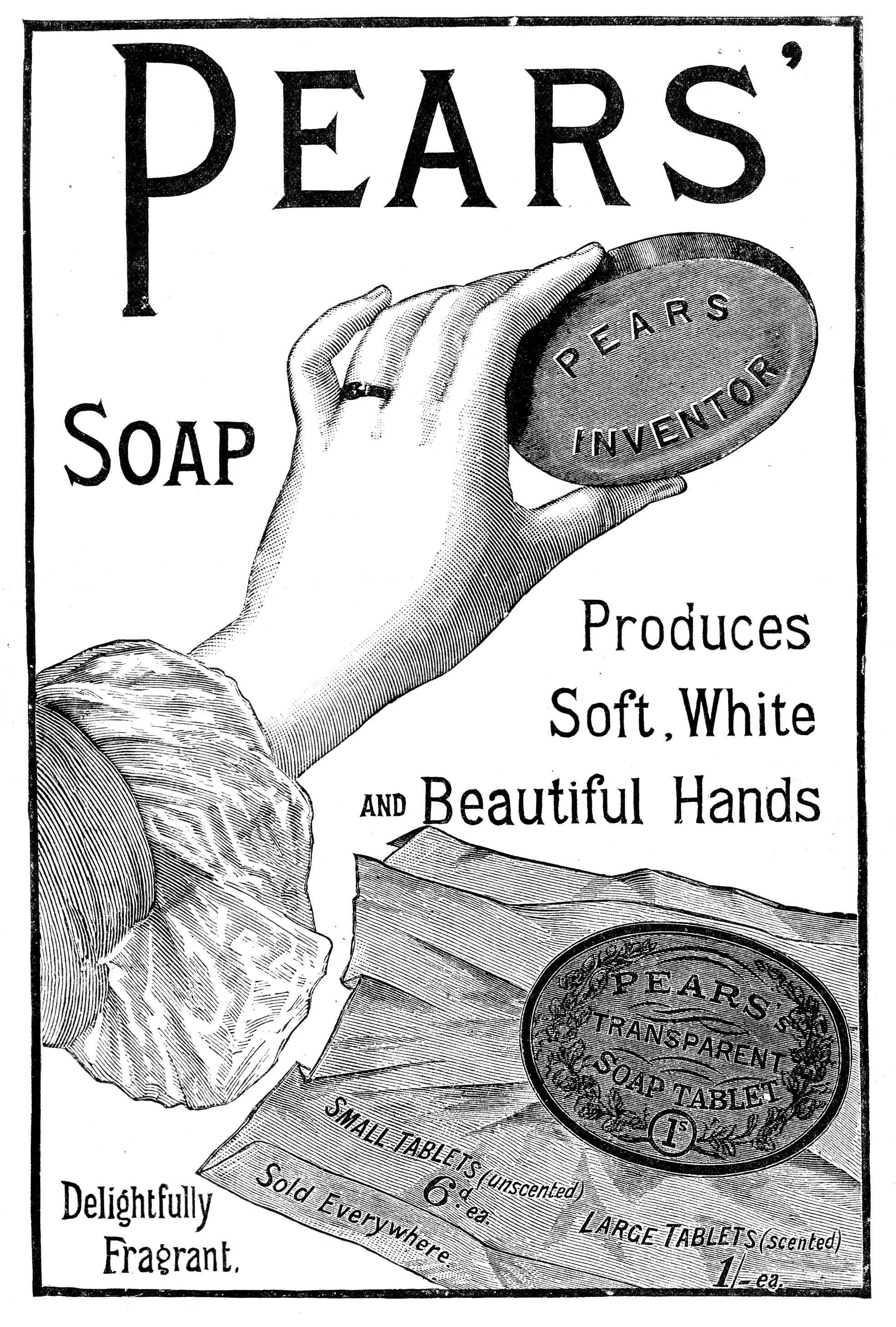
1886 ad for Pears soap

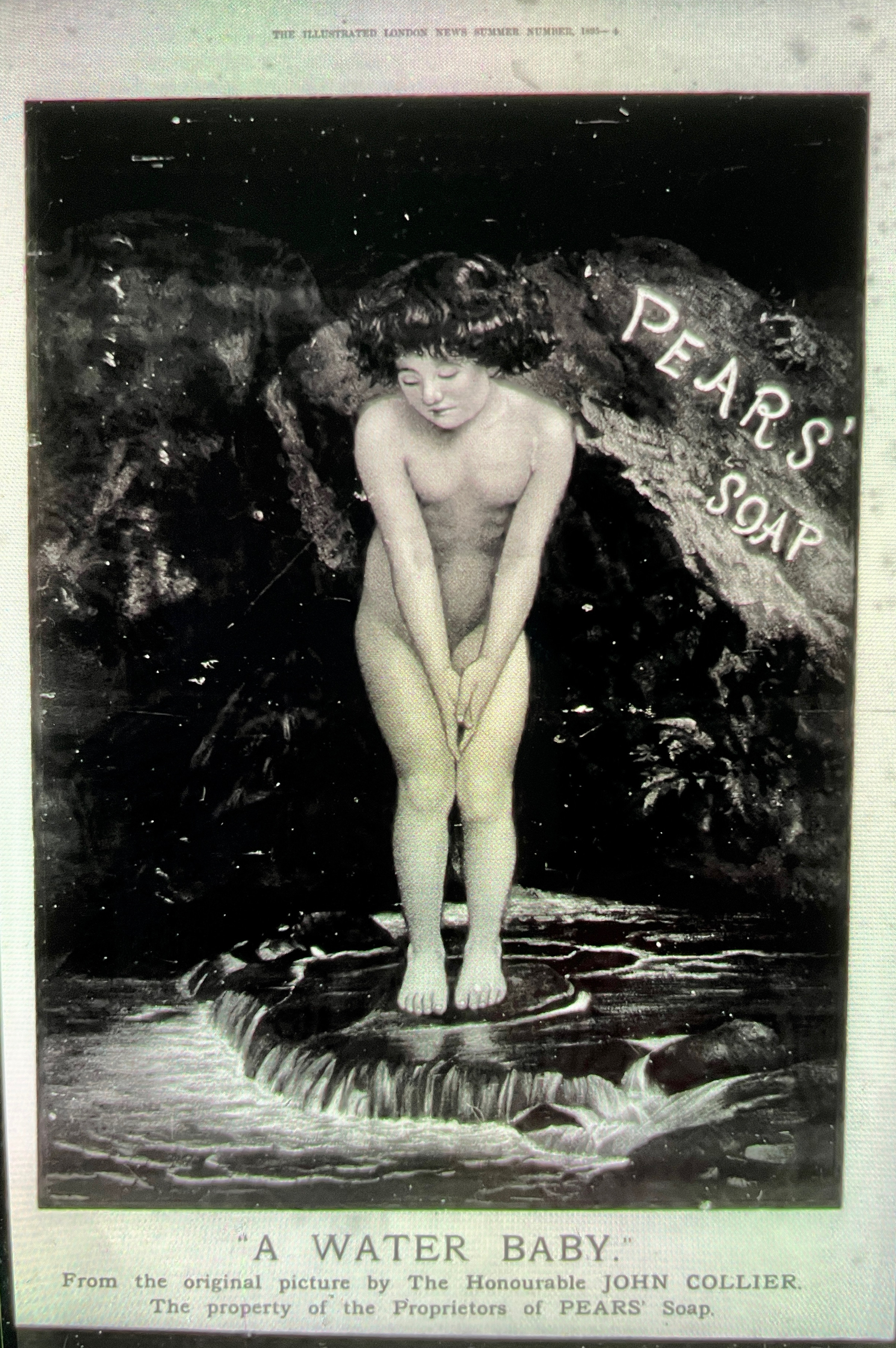
Using John Collier's Water baby (1890) to advertise the soap in the Illustrated London News, summer edition 1895, p. 4

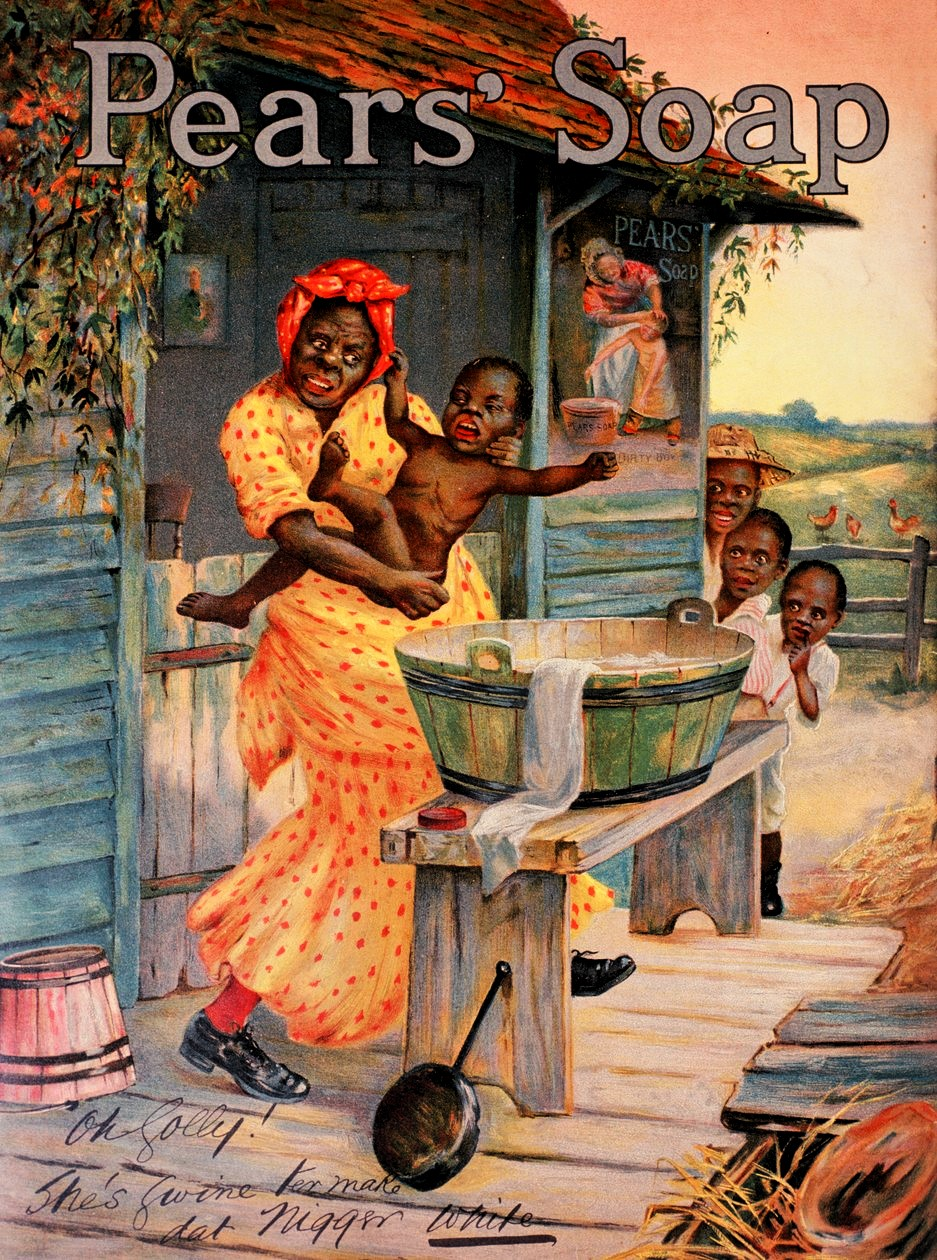
"Oh Golly, she's gwine to make dat nigger white", 1901

== The formula ==
=== Historical overview ===
Pears' unique manufacturing process required the soap to be dried for up to thirteen weeks so that the alcohol used could evaporate and be reused. The soap bars were laid out on wooden trays in drying rooms known as "ovens" about the size of a domestic garage. Bars were placed on trays with both sides open to the air. Ovens were graded in warmth from around 70F (21C) to 100F (39C). As drying proceeded, trolleys loaded with trays were moved to progressively warmer ovens. In practice the soap often became opaque. Unilever explored options to prevent this, all of which would have added to the cost:

- rotating the trays periodically so that those at the top were moved to the bottom;
- adding large paddle wheels to circulate the air better;
- completely re-duct how the warm air entered the ovens to achieve the same effect.

=== 2003 change ===
On 27 February 2003, the 7th Amendment to the EU Cosmetics Directive (Directive 2003/15/EC) introduced a new legal requirement regarding the labelling of 26 specific ingredients if they are present in a cosmetic product above the following concentration thresholds: 0.001% (10 mg/kg) for leave-on products and 0.01% (100 mg/kg) for rinse-off products.

The labelling requirement is linked to the presence of the substance in concentrations higher than the above-mentioned thresholds, regardless of the substance's function and source (i.e., whether added as such or as a component of a complex cosmetic ingredient such as botanical extracts, essential oils, fragrance compositions, aroma compositions, etc.).

Unilever was required to list those of the 26 specific ingredients in Pears in concentrations greater than 0.01%. Benzyl benzoate, Cinnamal, Eugenol, Limonene, and Linalool were included in the labelling because they are among the ingredients covered by Directive 2003/15/EC. It is, therefore, possible that they were components of the original formula, rather than newly added ingredients.

=== 2009 change ===
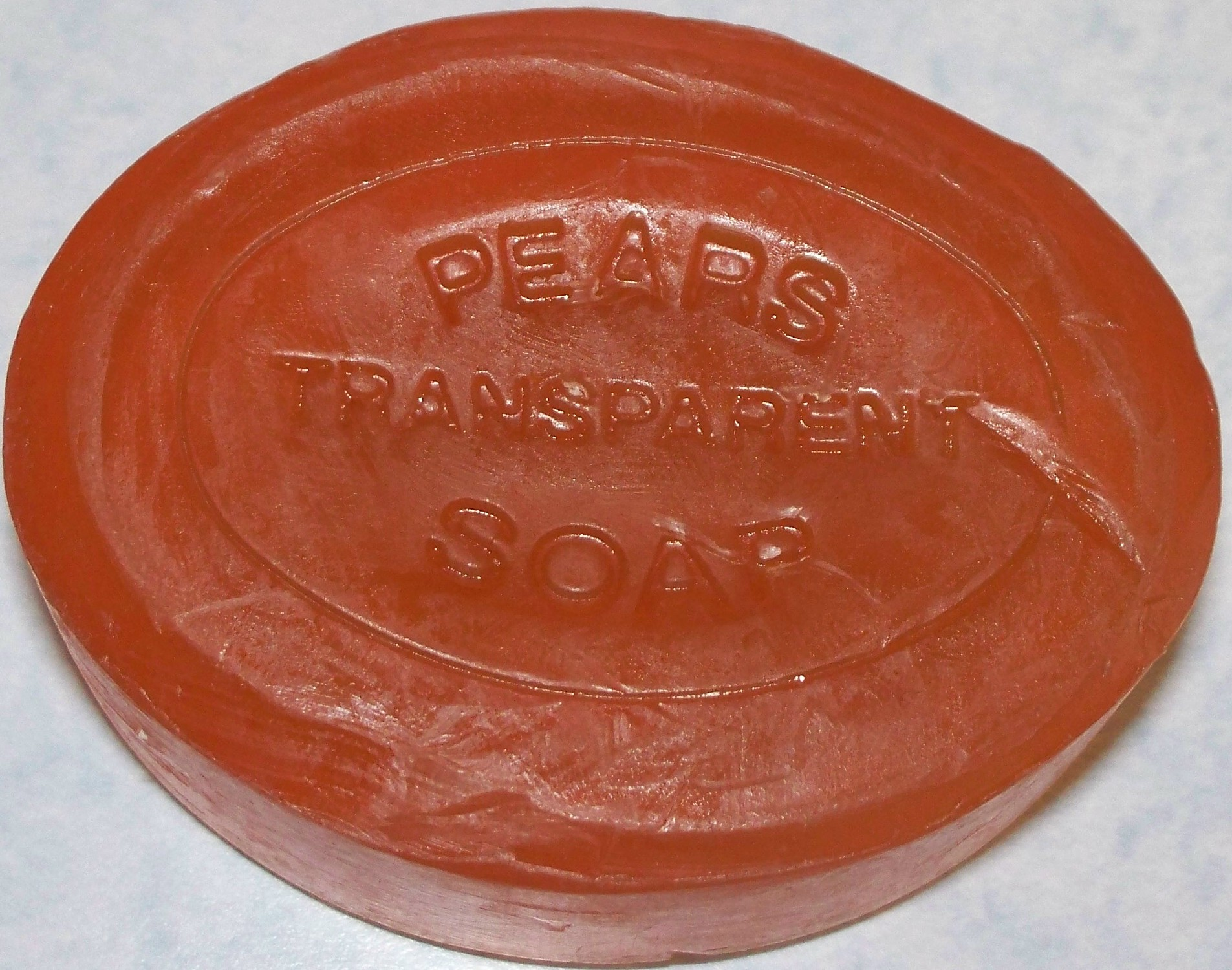
A bar of Pears 'Gentle Care' soap.

In October 2009, the formula for the transparent amber soap was altered from the original to become 'Gentle Care' and wrapped in an inner cellophane covering. The new soap was slightly softer in texture and lasted half as long, but its most noticeable difference was its scent. The aroma of the classic transparent amber bar, which used to be characterized by a mild, spicy herbal fragrance, had been altered to a more pungent aromatic scent. The "Hypoallergenic, non-comedogenic" claim was dropped, and the 3-month aging process described on the original box does not appear on the 'Gentle Care' formula box.

On 6 January 2010, after a Facebook campaign, it was reported in the media that Pears planned to abandon the new formula and that by March 2010, a new version would be available that is "much closer to the original". On 8 January 2010, it was reported in the media that Pears would not abandon the new formula but "make further improvements, by delivering a scent that more closely resembles" the original formula.

=== 2016 relaunch ===
The Pears Web site announces "2016 – The beloved British Icon Returns – Pears is re-launched in UK".

archived from the original.

Home soap makers have made soaps using the original eight components of Pears soap..

=== Comparison of the historical formulas ===
The information in the table below needs to be verified. The dates, in particular, need documented support. Also, the information may need to be expanded as there are at least four ingredient listings known to exist for Pears soap in recent years.

An analysis of the current ingredients list reveals items such as limonene, whose variant called L-limonene is characterised by a "turpentine-like odour" also typical of frankincense. It is an insecticide as well. However, this item was present in the pre-2009 formula, so the perceived change might be explained by different ingredients and by different proportions of ingredients.

The latest 2009 modification mainly breaks down to an addition of artificial colouring and substances whose hypothetical function is either as detergents (i.e., cleaning substances) or stabilisers (i.e., product longevity enhancers). However, even the pre-2009 formula was far from the original one. The latter was utterly free of industrial cleaners, free of synthetic colours, and (apparently) free of synthetic odorants, whose place was occupied by natural herbal fragrances. However, one unknown in the original formula is the "Pears fragrance essence": the customer cannot be sure whether the "new" fragrant compounds are indeed all new—or simply formerly unlisted items.

During production at Port Sunlight, the glycerol (glycerine) content resulted from not removing the glycerol (glycerine) that had formed during the manufacturing process.

Old-stock soaps	Hindustan Unilever Ltd., Cert Brands-distributed bars	New soaps
1807–2009	2003–2009	October 2009 – now (July 2013?)
Group I: Traditional ingredients
rosemary extract—natural odorant; thyme extract—natural odorant; Pears fragrance essence	parfum (perfume)	perfume
water	aqua (water)	aqua (water)
glycerine (glycerol)	glycerin (glycerol)	glycerin (glycerol)
natural rosin See also glycerol ester of wood rosin	rosin	sodium rosinate (rosin soap) See also tall oil
sodium tallowate See also tallowate	sodium palmate; sodium stearate	sodium Sodium palmate/stearate; Sodium palmate#
sodium cocoate	sodium cocoate; sodium peanutate	
Group II: Trivial introductions
	alcohol denaturate (alcohol)	alcohol
		sorbitol
		sodium chloride (table salt)
Group III: Detergents, stabilisers/preservatives, emulsifiers
	tetrasodium EDTA	tetrasodium EDTA
	tetrasodium etidronate (salt of etidronic acid)	etidronic acid
		propylene glycol; PEG-4 (polyethylene glycol)
		sodium lauryl sulfate
		sodium metabisulfite
		BHT (butylated hydroxytoluene)—an antioxidant
Group IV: Colouring agents
		CI (an EC "Cosmetic Ingredients" database number)
Group V: New fragrance agents
	benzyl benzoate; eugenol; cinnamal; limonene; linalool	benzyl benzoate, benzyl salicylate; eugenol; cinnamal; limonene; linalool
