= Pears' Cyclopaedia =

One-volume encyclopaedia published in the United Kingdom

- Front cover of the 2017 edition of Pears' Cyclopaedia
- Editor: Chris Cook (1977–2017)
- Author: Thomas J. Barratt (1897 (first ed.) -?)
- Language: English
- Subject: General
- Genre: Reference work; encyclopedia
- Published: (1898–1959) Pears; (1959–1988) Pelham Books; (1988–2017) Penguin
- Publisher: Penguin
- Publication date: 1897–2017
- Publication place: United Kingdom
- Media type: Print (Hardback)
- Pages: 832 (last ed.)
- ISBN: 0141985542 ISBN of the last 2017 ed.
- OCLC: 1023148764
- Dewey Decimal: 032
- Website: Official website

Pears' Cyclopaedia was a one-volume encyclopaedia published in the United Kingdom. Pears' Soap launched the original Pears' Shilling Cyclopaedia in December 1897, the year of Queen Victoria's Diamond Jubilee.

The first edition contained an English dictionary, a medical dictionary, a gazetteer and atlas, desk information and a compendium of general knowledge entitled "A Mass of Curious and Useful Information and Things that everyone ought to know in Commerce, History, Science, Religion, Literature and the other Topics of Ordinary Conversation".

== Background ==
Each edition traditionally featured an atlas, a gazetteer, a chronological list of events, a list of prominent people (past and present), a miniature encyclopaedia of general information and around a dozen or more other sections on various subjects such as cinema, classical mythology, current events, wine, astronomy, ideas and beliefs, gardening, medicine, etc. The selection of subjects varied slightly over the years, and in later years the world atlas section was dropped, leaving a world and European map inside the front and rear covers and with the Gazetteer limited to the British Isles.

From 1953, it was published annually. It was published by Pelham Books from 1959 to 1988, and from then until the final, 2017 edition by Penguin Books. Dr. Chris Cook was the editor from 1977 until the final edition.

During the 1950s, Pears' awarded the Silver Pears' Trophy annually to a prominent person for "outstanding British achievement in any field."

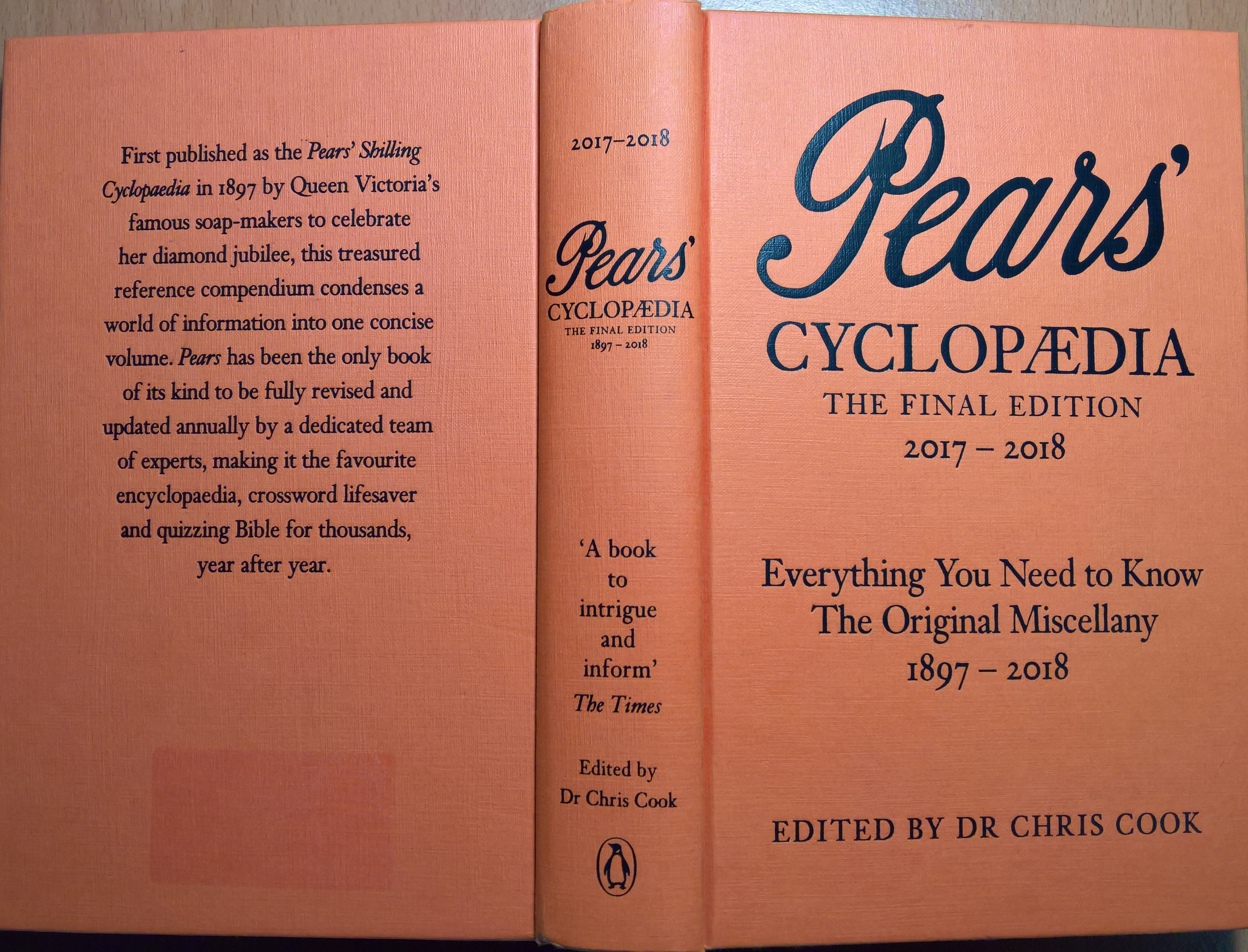
Pears' Cyclopaedia, The Final Edition

The 2017–2018 edition, released on 31 August 2017, was subtitled "The Final Edition". The publisher confirmed it is the last:

In the age of the internet, Pears' has continued to be a uniquely British almanac, reaching readers across generations. It is with great sadness that we stop publishing it as Dr. Cook retires but we celebrate his dedication and generosity over the past four decades.

According to The Bookseller, "Statistics from Nielsen BookScan have also revealed volume sales of the work have sharply declined in recent years: the 2001/02 edition sold 24,229 copies whereas the 2016/17 edition sold only 2,854." Over its history, Pears' had "produced sales over 3 million copies by the 1930s and at least as many since". The Guardian's article on the final edition cites total sales over the last decade (2007–2017) of "more than 120,000", adding that, "according to Penguin, it did particularly well in election years".

Sam Leith wrote in The Times Literary Supplement: "Now, rendered quite redundant in that respect by Wikipedia (among many, many other things), Pears' is more a curiosity than a serious reference resource." But he continues: "You’re more likely, as I did, to open this Cyclopaedia to see whether something’s in it than in the hopes of finding out about that something. Which said, on that level it is full of interest. To the very great credit of Dr. Chris Cook, who has been annually (and manually) updating the Cyclopaedia since 1977, it has done a semi-successful job of its madly quixotic project of keeping up with the times."

The final page of the final edition summarizes "The Story of Pears, 1897–2017" and concludes:

The single most important factor in the Pears success story, and the key to its truly unique publishing phenomenon, is that it is the only book of its kind to be fully revised and updated by a team of experts every year.

Schools and colleges, offices and libraries, students and researchers, newspapers, radio and TV stations – for all these and many more, for whom readily accessible, reliable facts at their fingertips are needed, Pears' Cyclopaedia remained an invaluable companion. Now, the ready availability of electronic information has made the printed reference work no longer commercially competitive. That is progress. But many will regret the passing of a famous book that, in its heyday, had become not only a national institution but also the reliable pathway for successive generations of working-class families to a better education.
