= TFM =

TFM may refer to:

== Arts and entertainment ==
- Hits Radio Teesside, A radio station in North-East England previously called TFM.
- Transformice, a 2010 French online game
- The Fame Monster, a 2009 album by Lady Gaga

== Science and technology ==
- TFM (piscicide), a poison for fish
- TeX font metric, a typeface file format
- Thin-film composite membrane
- Total fatty matter, a metric for soap
- Traction force microscopy, in cellular biology
- Trifluoromescaline, a psychedelic drug

== Transport ==
- Grupo Transportación Ferroviaria Mexicana, a Mexican rail operator
- Transportes Ferroviarios de Madrid, a concessionaire for Madrid Metro Line 9
