= Ivorine =

Ivorine may refer to:

- Celluloid styled to resemble ivory
- A former name of the soap company Ivory.
- A by-product of ivory carving mixed with resin, sometimes used to carve netsukes.
- Resembling ivory.
