= Ivory (soap) =

American personal care brand (created 1879)

- Product type: Personal care
- Current owner: Procter & Gamble
- Country: United States
- Introduced: 1879; 147 years ago
- Markets: United States, Canada, Philippines (until 1999)
- Website: www.ivory.com

Ivory (French: Savon d'Ivoire) is an American flagship personal care brand created by the Procter & Gamble Company (P&G), including varieties of white and mildly scented bar soap that became famous for its claim of purity and for floating on water. Over the years, the brand has been extended to other varieties and products.

== History ==
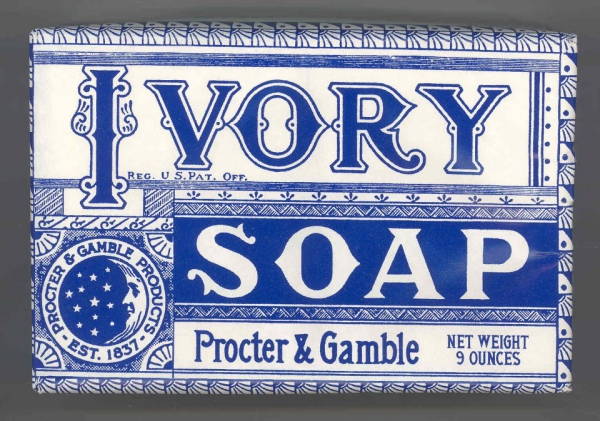
Ivory Soap, 1800s

In 1840, the J.B. Williams Company in Glastonbury, Connecticut, manufactured soap under the name Ivorine. Williams decided to focus on its shaving soap and sold Ivorine to Procter & Gamble, which later developed Ivory.

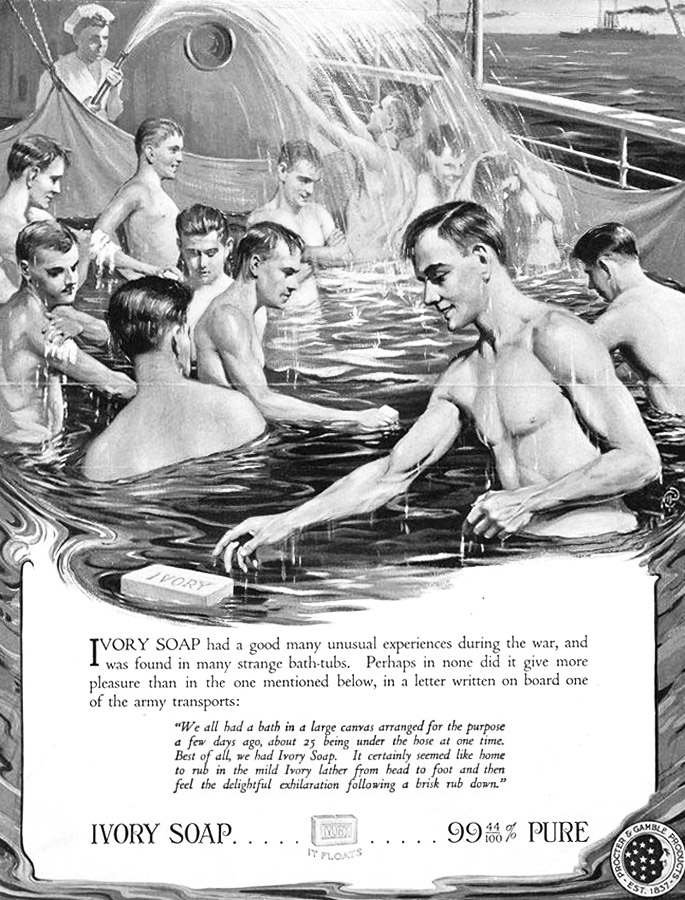
WWI era Magazine ad illustrating the advantage of floating soap

In 1879, James Norris Gamble, son of Procter & Gamble co-founder James Gamble and a trained chemist, developed an inexpensive white soap. The name Ivory was chosen by Harley Procter, the other founder's son, who was inspired by the quote "[a]ll thy garments smell of myrrh and aloes and cassia out of the ivory palaces", from Psalm 45 of the Bible. In September 1879, Procter & Gamble trademarked "Ivory" as the name of its new soap product.

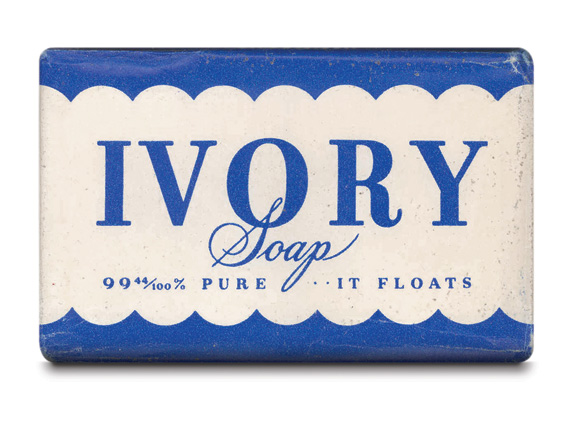
Ivory Soap c. 1954

As Ivory is one of P&G's oldest products – it was first sold in 1879 – P&G is sometimes called "Ivory Towers", and its factory and research center in St. Bernard, Ohio, is nicknamed "Ivorydale".

Ivory's first slogan, "It Floats!", was introduced in 1891. The product's other well-known slogan, "99 44/100% Pure", which was in use by 1895, was based on the results of an analysis by an independent laboratory that Harley Procter hired to demonstrate that Ivory was purer than the castile soap available at the time.

The original Ivory bar soap was whipped with air in its production and floated in water. In 2013, P&G discontinued this version of the soap, and the new version no longer floats. According to an apocryphal story, later discounted by the company, a worker accidentally left the mixing machine on too long, and the company chose to sell the "ruined" batch because the added air did not change the basic ingredients of the soap. When appreciative letters about the new, floating soap inundated the company, P&G ordered the extended mix time as a standard procedure. However, company records indicate that the design of Ivory did not come about by accident. In 2004, over 100 years later, the P&G company archivist Ed Rider found documentation that revealed that James N. Gamble, who was a chemist, had discovered how to make the soap float and noted the result in his writings.

In October 1992, Procter & Gamble market-tested a new Ivory formula, a "skin care bar" that would address customer complaints about dryness but would not float like the original. In October 2001, P&G tested the sinking bar soap as part of an advertising campaign in the United States, in a six-month plan to release 1,051 soap bars that sink, among other bars that float, to see if people would notice the sinking bars, even if given a cash reward of up to $250,000. The D. L. Blair company, part of Draft Worldwide, a unit of the Interpublic Group of Companies, was assigned to administer the contest.

== 21st century ==
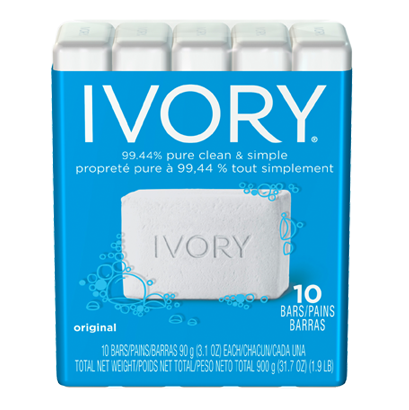
Ivory Soap c. 2010 – c. 2020

Ivory is currently a small brand by P&G standards. The Ivory brand includes the classic bar soap, clear liquid soap (discontinued before 2016), hair and body wash, dish liquid, and a mild laundry detergent (not a soap) product called Ivory Snow. Research in 2001 by Lehman Brothers revealed that the U.S. sales of all Ivory products, including the liquid soap and dish detergent, represented less than 1% of P&G's total worldwide sales in the 52 weeks ended September 9, 2001.

== Ingredients ==
A classic Ivory soap bar contains sodium tallowate, sodium cocoate or sodium palm kernelate, water, sodium chloride, sodium silicate, magnesium sulfate, and fragrance. The soap has a determined pH value of 9.5.

Ivory dishwashing liquid contains water, sodium lauryl sulfate, sodium laureth sulfate, alkyl dimethyl amine oxide, sodium chloride, PPG-26, cyclohexanediamine, phenoxyethanol, methylisothiazolinone, and fragrance. It is sometimes considered a detergent instead of a soap.

New varieties of Ivory soap contain new ingredients. Simply Ivory (French: simplement ivory) contains sodium tallowate and/or sodium palmate, water, sodium cocoate or sodium palm kernelate, glycerin, sodium chloride, fragrance, and one or more of the following: coconut acid, palm kernel acid, tallow acid, palmitic acid, and tetrasodium EDTA. Adding glycerol and fatty acids typically reduces the soap's harshness, while tetrasodium EDTA is used primarily to reduce soap scum formation. Ivory soap packaging has omitted the words "soap" or "float", and is now produced with modified formulas; Ivory soap no longer floats.

== See also ==
- Operation Ivory Soap, named after the product
- Sunlight, cleaning product
