= Silver Pears Trophy =

Award presented annually by Pears Cyclopaedia

The Silver Pears Trophy was an award presented annually by Pears Cyclopaedia for "outstanding British achievement in any field." The trophy was possibly awarded prior to 1953 and after 1958, but more research is needed on the subject.

== Award recipients ==
- 1953: Colonel Sir John Hunt
- 1954: Sir Roger Bannister (20 September 1954).
- 1955: Bertrand Russell
- 1957: Laurence Olivier
- 1958: Professor Sydney Chapman

== See also ==
- Commonwealth Games
- Trophy
