= Florian Papp =

Antiques gallery

Coordinates: 40°46′27.34″N 73°57′49.76″W

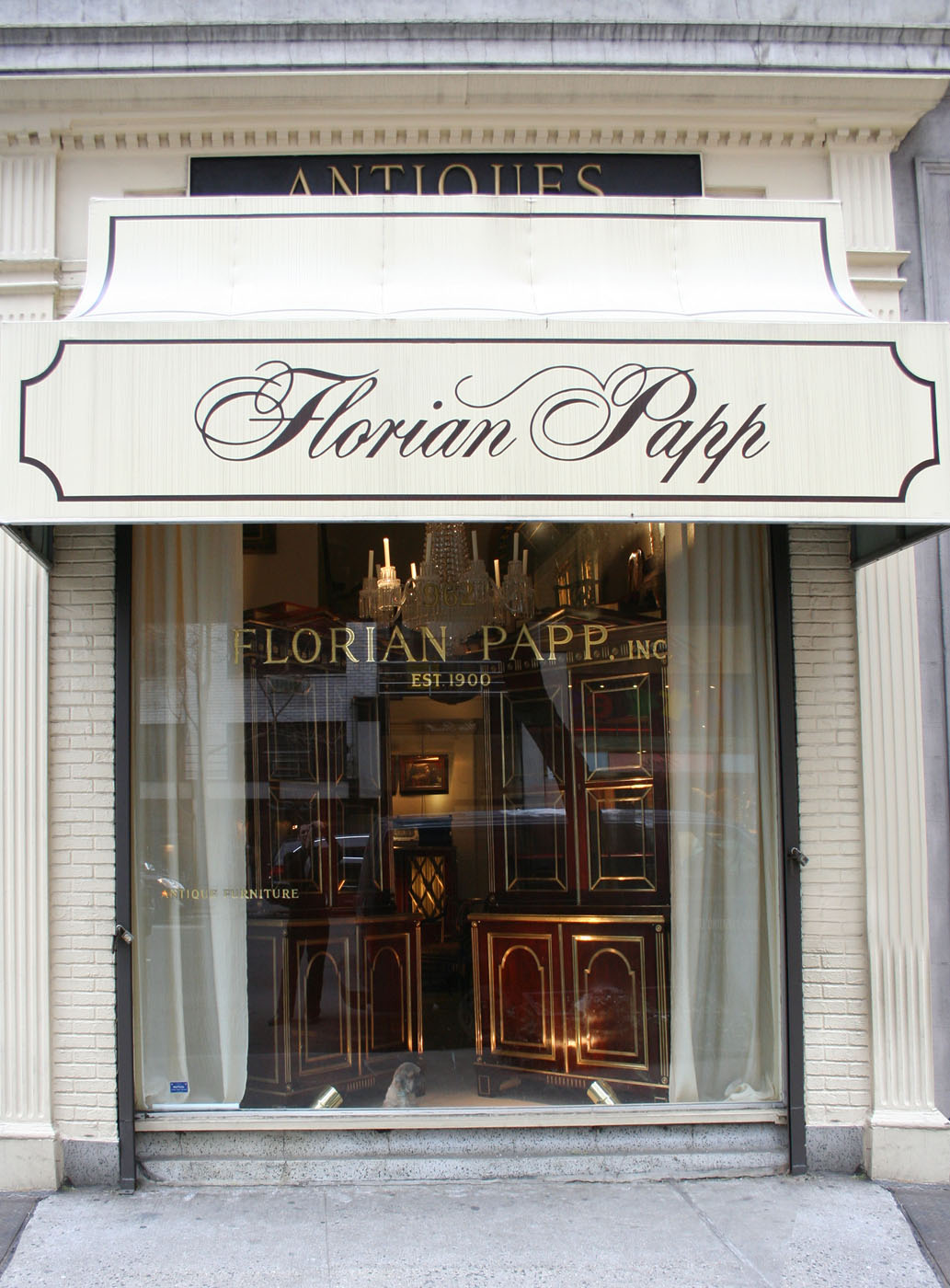
Front window of the Florian Papp Gallery at 962 Madison Ave.

Florian Papp is an antiques gallery based in New York City, U.S. One of the oldest in America, the company carries a collection of English and European antiques from the 18th through the 20th century.

== History ==
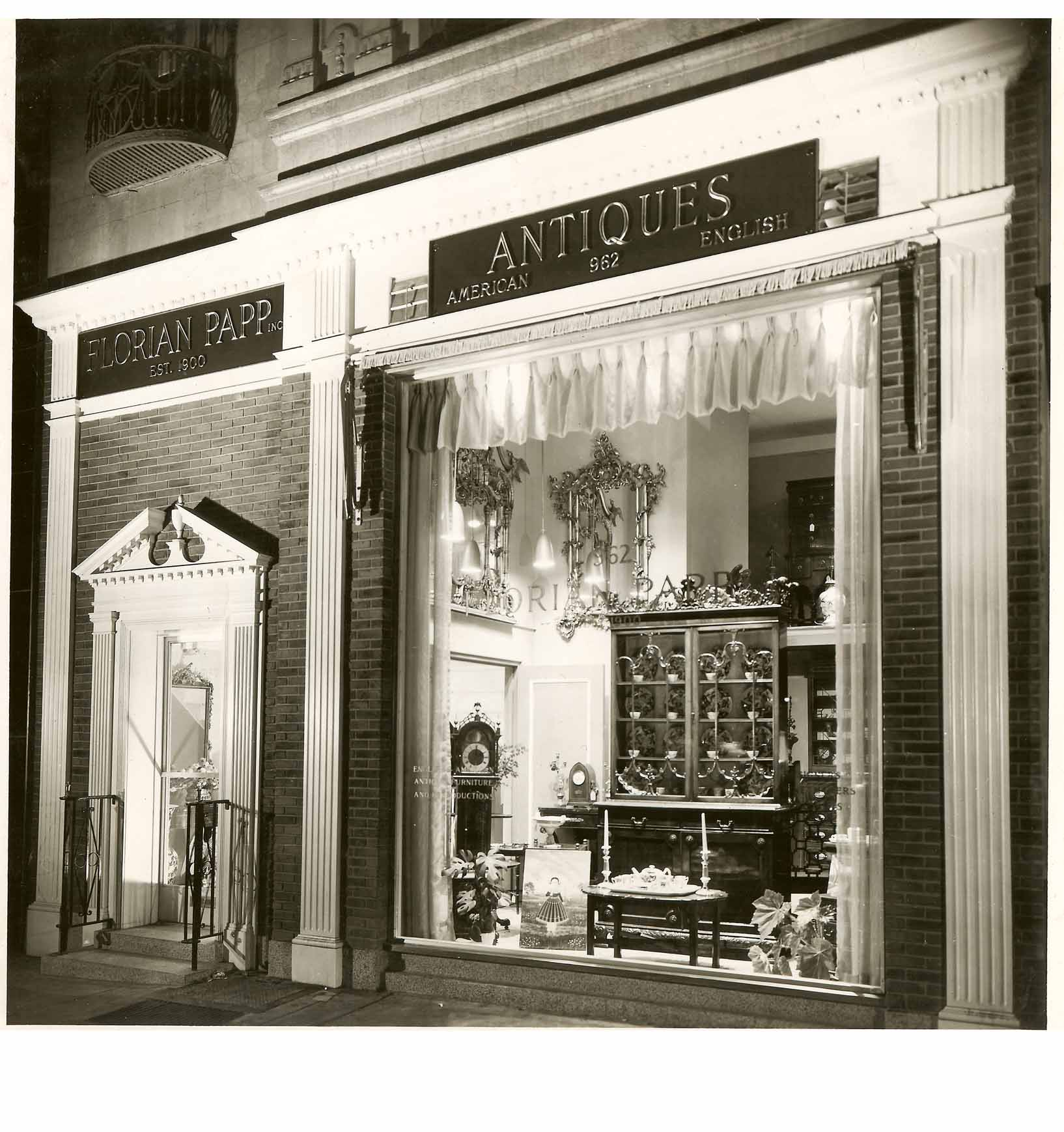
A photograph of the gallery storefront from the 1950s.

The company's namesake and founder, Florian Papp, was born on April 20, 1883, in Győrszentmárton, Győr, Hungary, to Lucas Papp (Lukacs Pap) and Julia Boross (Juliana Boros). He departed Hungary in the early twentieth century, leaving on the Kronprinz Wilhelm from the port of Bremen and arriving at Ellis Island on May 6, 1903. The ship’s manifest, which identifies him as Floryan Pap, describes him as 20 years old and a joiner by trade. Florian married Ilma Kovacs on June 24, 1905, in Manhattan. He died in January 1965 at age 81, survived by Ilma and their four sons: Joseph, George, William, and Robert.

Florian Papp's gallery was originally located in Chelsea, Manhattan until two of his sons, William and Joseph, joined him in the 1940s and followed the trends of the New York art world to the 57th Street area. In 1955, along with William's wife Alice, this second generation changed locations again to the current location on Madison Avenue between East 75th and 76th Streets.

The third generation, Melinda and William Jr. joined in the late 1970s and currently function as co-directors.

Florian Papp discovers quality antiques by examining the collections of antique dealers, private sellers, estates, and auction galleries both in the United States and abroad. Many of the pieces have been in the collection before, chosen by one of the two previous generations. They consider over 1000 antiques a week but rarely buy more than one or two.

== Publications and exhibitions ==
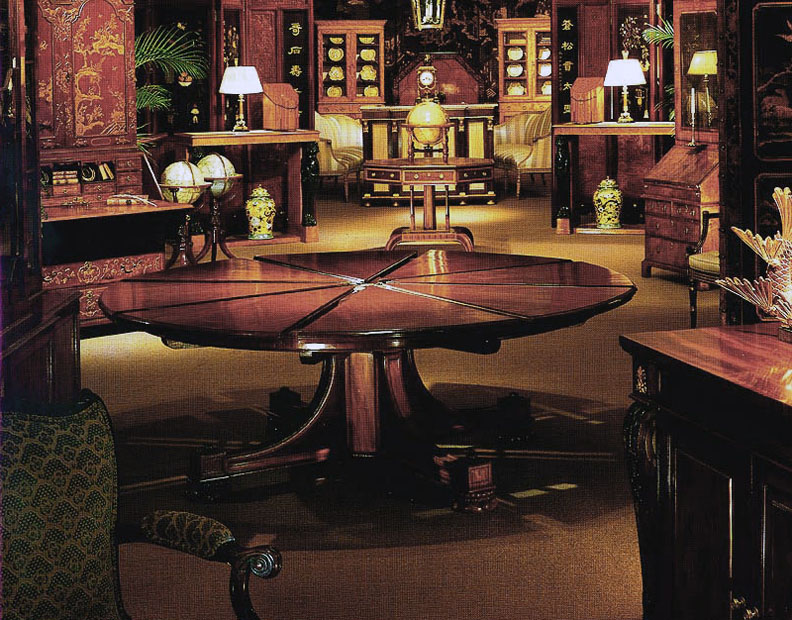
Florian Papp exhibition of an extending Regency mechanical dining table.

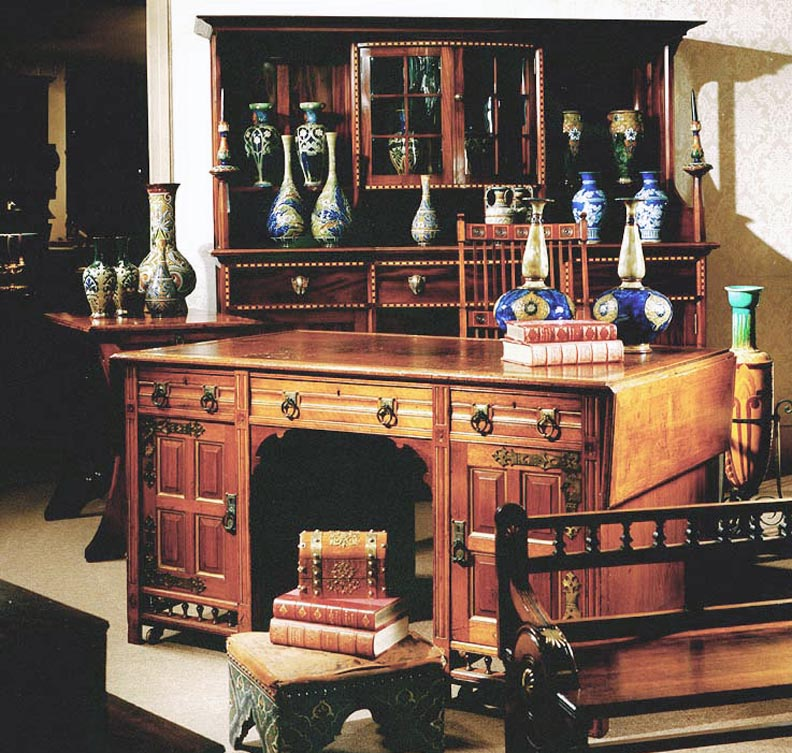
Florian Papp exhibition of Aesthetic period furniture.

- English Aesthetic Furniture (1860–1880), by Melinda Florian and William James Papp, Jr. Papp. Published 1986. Catalogue of research regarding English Aesthetic furniture.
- Rolled, Scrolled, Crimped, and Folded: The Lost art of Filigree Paperwork, by Melinda Florian and William James Papp, Jr. Papp. Published 1988. Catalogue of research regarding Paper Filigree or "Quilling".
- 1984–1989 "The Box: An Exhibition of the Most Diverse, Curious and Wholly Remarkable Forms of Antique Boxes." The Florian Papp Gallery, New York City. An annual winter exhibition.
- 2003–2004 “Bringing Home the Grand Tour: European Watercolour Drawings of Architecture, Gardens and Interiors 1750–1900” The Florian Papp Gallery, New York City. A Charles Plante exhibition. (December 3, 2003 to January 23, 2004)
- 2004–2005 “Our Mirrored Past: Bricks, Flowers and Likenesses in Watercolours and Drawings 1750–1900,” The Florian Papp Gallery, New York City. A Charles Plante exhibition. (December 1, 2004 to January 22, 2005)

== Bibliography ==
- Moonan, Wendy (January 28, 2000) "ANTIQUES; High Style And Charm In Florida" The New York Times.
- Vogel, Carol. "Antiquities Notebook: The Appeal of Fine Craftsmanship." Architectural Digest, 1982.
- Moonan, Wendy (December 19, 2003) "ANTIQUES" The New York Times.
- Deitz, Paula (August 27, 1989) "ANTIQUES; Decorative Boxes House Secrets and Surprises" The New York Times.
- Reif, Rita (May 8, 1988) "ANTIQUES; Paper Filigree: An Art for Leisure".
- Salk, Susanna "Shop Talk at Florian Papp: Gen III", 1stdibs.com.
