= Sodium cocoate =

Sodium cocoate is a mixture of fatty acid salts (acid salts) of coconut oil that is used in some soaps.

Sodium cocoate is produced by hydrolysis of the ester linkages in coconut oil with sodium hydroxide, a strong base.

The CAS number for sodium cocoate is 61789-31-9.

== See also ==
- Sodium laurate
- Sodium myristate
- Sodium tallowate
