= Tetrasodium EDTA =

Names
- IUPAC name Tetrasodium N,N′-(ethane-1,2-diyl)bis[N-(carboxylatomethyl)glycinate]
- Systematic IUPAC name Tetrasodium 2,2′,2′′,2′′′-(Ethane-1,2-diyldinitrilo)tetraacetate
- Other names E39; Trilon B

Identifiers
CAS Number	64-02-8 (anhydrous); 13235-36-4 (tetrahydrate)
3D model (JSmol)	Interactive image
ChemSpider	5914
ECHA InfoCard	100.000.522
EC Number	200-573-9
PubChem CID	6144
UNII	MP1J8420LU (anhydrous); L13NHD21X6 (tetrahydrate)
CompTox Dashboard (EPA)	DTXSID3026350
- InChI: InChI=1S/C10H16N2O8.4Na.H2O/c13-7(14)3-11(4-8(15)16)1-2-12(5-9(17)18)6-10(19)20;;;;;/h1-6H2,(H,13,14)(H,15,16)(H,17,18)(H,19,20);;;;;1H2/q;4*+1;/p-4 Key: GXFFSKMBMYHTAE-UHFFFAOYSA-J
- SMILES: C(CN(CC(=O)[O-])CC(=O)[O-])N(CC(=O)[O-])CC(=O)[O-].O.[Na+].[Na+].[Na+].[Na+]

Properties
Chemical formula	C_{10}H_{12}N_{2}Na_{4}O_{8}
Molar mass	380.171 g·mol^{−1}
Appearance	White solid

Hazards
- GHS labelling
Pictograms	(GHS05: Corrosive) (GHS07: Exclamation mark)
Signal word	Danger
Hazard statements	H302, H318
Precautionary statements	P264, P270, P280, P301+P312, P305+P351+P338, P310, P330, P501
- Except where otherwise noted, data are given for materials in their standard state (at 25 °C [77 °F], 100 kPa). Infobox references

Tetrasodium EDTA is the salt resulting from the neutralization of ethylenediaminetetraacetic acid with four equivalents of sodium hydroxide (or an equivalent sodium base). It is a white solid that is highly soluble in water. Commercial samples are often hydrated, e.g. Na_{4}EDTA^{.}4H_{2}O. The properties of solutions produced from the anhydrous and hydrated forms are the same, provided they are at the same pH.

It is used as a source of the chelating agent EDTA^{4-}. A 1% aqueous solution has a pH of approximately 11.3. When dissolved in neutral water, it converts partially to H_{2}EDTA^{2-}. Ethylenediaminetetraacetic acid is produced commercially via the intermediacy of tetrasodium EDTA.

Ethylenediaminetetraacetic acid is the acidic form of tetrasodium EDTA.

== Products ==
The substance is also known as Dissolvine E-39. It is a salt of edetic acid. It has been known at least since 1954. It is sometimes used as a chelating agent.

The assignee on 5% of patents at the USPTO containing the substance is the firm Procter and Gamble. It is used most notably in cosmetics and hair and skin care products.

The substance has been used to aid in formulation of a removal product for rust, corrosion, and scale from ferrous metal, copper, brass, and other surfaces.

At a concentration of 6%, it is the main active ingredient in some types of engine coolant system flushes.
