= Thomas J. Barratt =

British businessman (1841–1914)

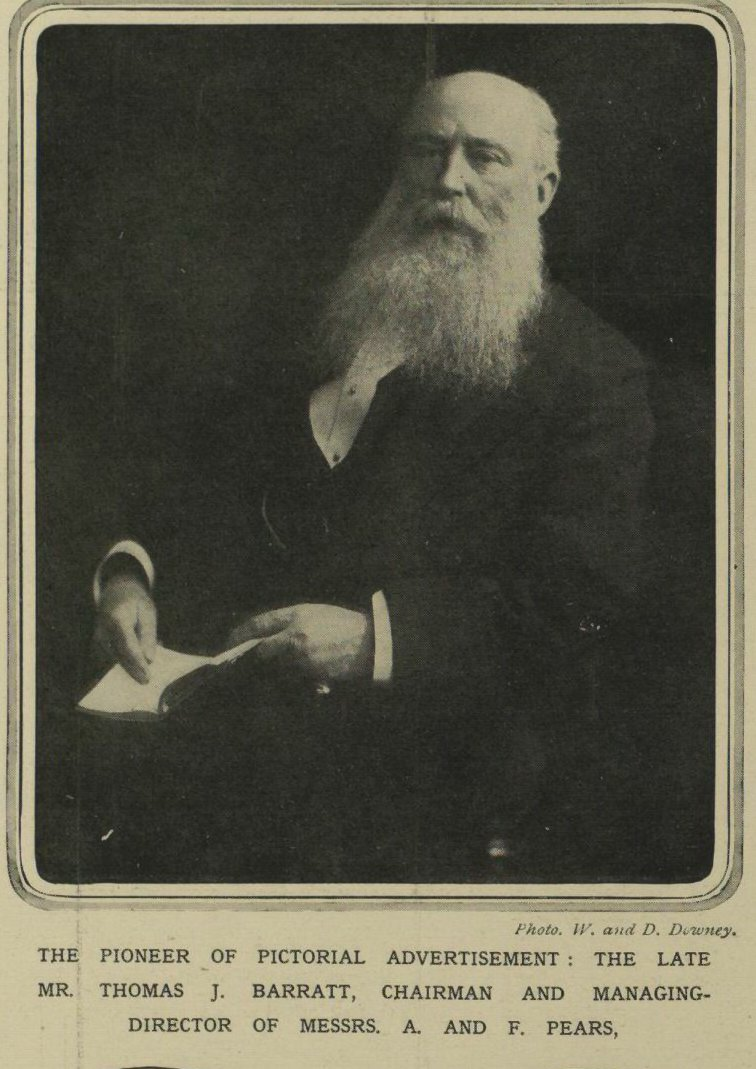
- Born: 1841; London, England
- Died: 1914 (aged 72–73)
- Spouse: Mary Pears

Thomas James Barratt (1841–1914) was an English businessman who was the chairman of the soap manufacturer A. & F. Pears. A pioneer of brand marketing, he has been called "the father of modern advertising".

== Early life ==
Barratt was born in London. He married Mary Pears, the eldest daughter of Francis Pears, the head of A. & F. Pears. He consequently entered the firm in 1865, becoming his father-in-law's partner. Under his leadership, the company instituted a systematic method of advertising its distinctive soap, in which slogans and memorable images were combined. His slogan "Good morning. Have you used Pears' soap?" was famous in its day. It continued to be a well-known catchphrase into the 20th century.

== Guinness World Record ==
Barratt was awarded a Guinness World Record in 2014 for being considered the world's first brand manager, a job he held for A. & F. Pears from 1865.

== Career ==
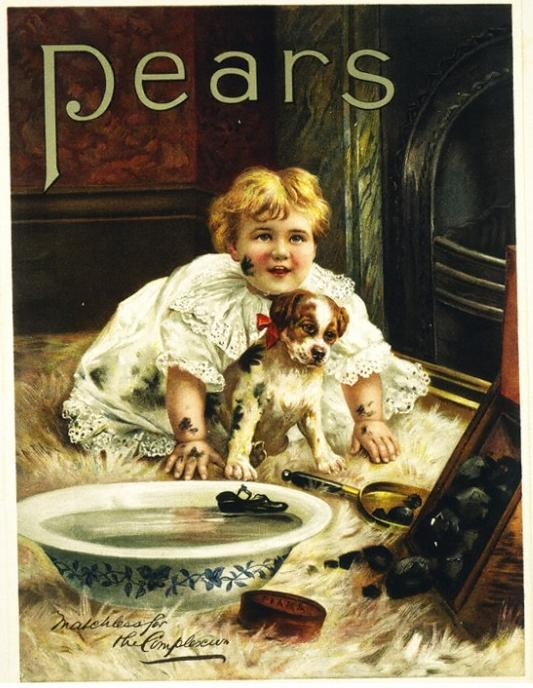
One of the posters for Pears soap created under Barratt's leadership, 1900, A. & F. Pears Ltd. (Victoria and Albert Museum, London)

Barratt was keen to equate Pears with quality and high culture through his campaign methods. He acquired works of art to use in the advertisements, most famously John Everett Millais' painting Bubbles, which he turned into an advertisement by adding a bar of Pears soap in the foreground. Millais was said to be unhappy about the alteration, but he could do nothing, as Barratt had acquired the copyright. Barratt followed this with a series of advertisements inspired by Millais' painting, portraying cute children in idealized middle-class homes, associating Pears with social aspiration and domestic comfort.

Barratt also made effective use of testimonials, recruiting both scientists and glamorous high-society figures. In 1882, Barratt recruited English actress and socialite Lillie Langtry to become the poster-girl for Pears soap, making her the first celebrity to endorse a commercial product. He also established Pears Annual in 1891, in which he promoted contemporary illustration and colour printing. In 1897, he added Pears Cyclopedia, a single volume encyclopedia.

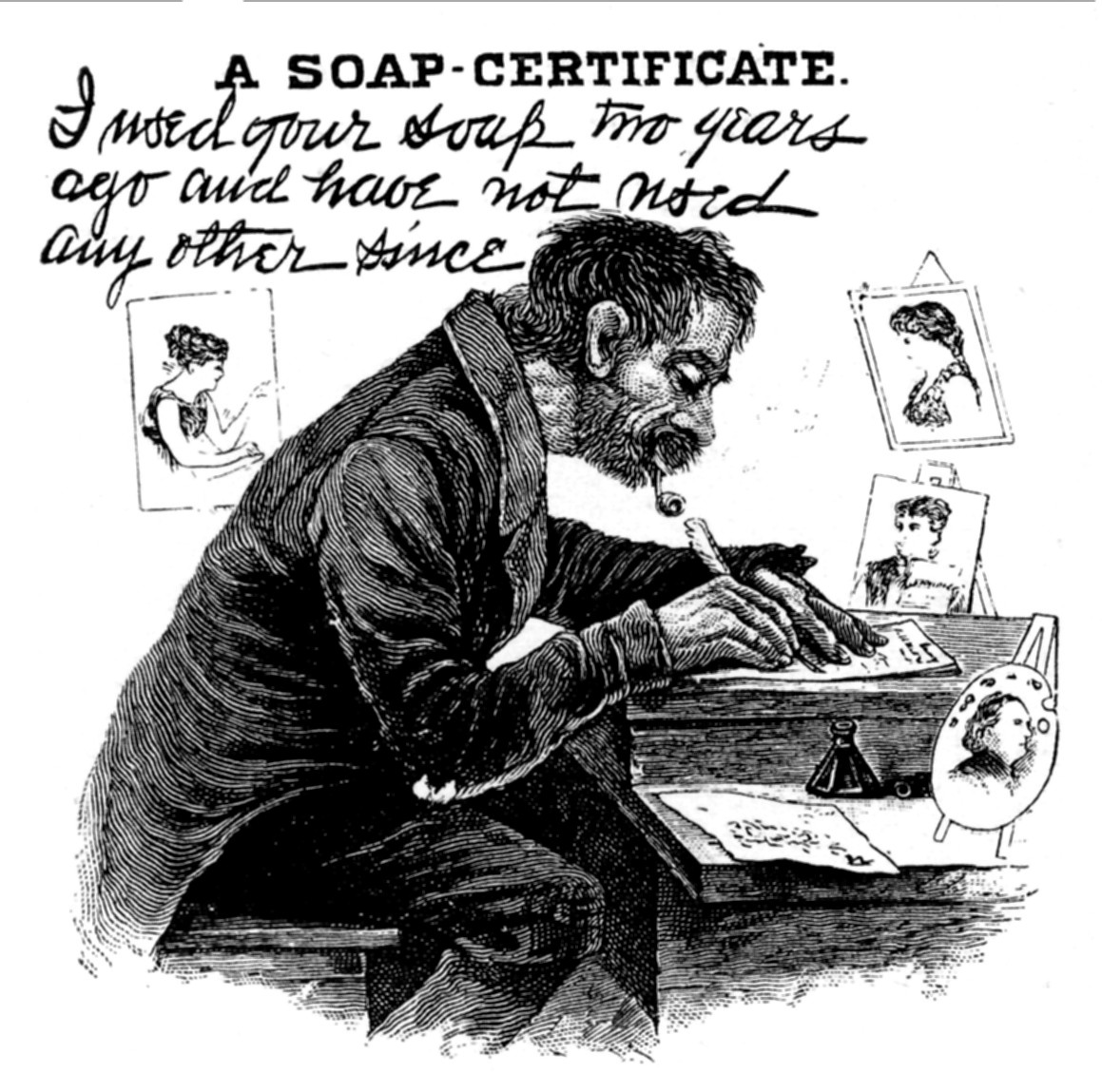
Furness's parody of Barrett's advertising

Barratt's methods led to much comment and parody, most famously a Harry Furniss Punch cartoon in which a tramp says "I used your soap two years ago, and have not used any other since", a parody of Langtry's testimonial advertisement for the soap. Barratt bought the rights to the cartoon and used it in Pears' own marketing. Another of Barratt's gimmicks was to import half a million French centimes, imprint them with Pears' name and introduce them into circulation. The ploy caused huge publicity and led to an act of Parliament to protect British currency. Barratt also linked Pears' to British imperial culture, associating the cleansing power of the soap with the imagery of worldwide commerce and the empire's civilising mission.

Barratt was not a systematic theorist of marketing, but he introduced a number of ideas that were widely circulated. He was keen to define a strong brand image for Pears while also emphasising his products' ubiquity with saturation campaigns. He was also aware of the need for constant reinvention, stating in 1907 that "tastes change, fashions change and the advertiser has to change with them. An idea that was effective a generation ago would fall flat, stale, and unprofitable if presented to the public today. Not that the idea of today is always better than the older idea, but it is different - it hits the present taste."

== Publishing and other positions ==
In addition to his business and advertising activity Barratt wrote a history of Hampstead, Annals of Hampstead (1912). He became Deputy Lieutenant of the City of London, a Master of the Barbers' Company, and a Fellow of the Royal Microscopical and Statistical Societies. He was also a member of several clubs.

== Arms ==
Coat of arms of Thomas J. Barratt
Notes Confirmed on 9th January 1905. Crest A bezant charged with a lymphad sails furled flag and pennants flying to the dexter and in front of the mast two oars in saltire all Azure. Torse Of the colours. Escutcheon Per fess Or and Azure in chief a Cross Tau between two escallops of the second and in base four barrulets Argent. Motto Veritas Et Caritas
