= Total fatty matter =

Characteristic of soap

Total fatty matter (TFM) is one of the most important characteristics describing the quality of soap and is always specified in commercial transactions. It is defined as the total amount of fatty matter, mostly fatty acids, that can be separated from a sample after splitting with a mineral acid, usually hydrochloric acid.

The fatty acids most commonly present in soap are oleic, stearic and palmitic acids, and pure, dry, sodium oleate has a TFM of 92.8%, while top quality soap noodles, now increasingly used for making soap tablets in small and medium-sized factories, are typically traded with a specification of TFM of 78% min., moisture 14% max. But besides moisture, finished commercial soap, especially laundry soap, also contains fillers used to lower its cost or confer special properties, plus emollients, preservatives, etc., making the TFM go as low as 50%. Fillers, which are usually dry powders, also make the soap harder, harsher on the skin, and with a greater tendency to become 'mushy' in water, so low TFM is usually associated with lower quality and hardness. In the past, and still in some countries today, soap with a TFM of 75% minimum was called Grade 1, 65% minimum was called Grade 2, and less than 60% was called Grade 3.
