= Abdul Ghaffar Aziz =

Pakistani politician and Islamic scholar (1962–2020)

- عبدالغفار عزیز

Deputy Emir of Jamaat-e-Islami
- In office April 2019 – 5 October 2020

Director of Foreign Affairs of JI
- In office c. 2000 – 5 October 2020

Personal details
- Born: 1962
- Died: 5 October 2020 (aged 57–58)
- Party: Jamaat-e-Islami
- Occupation: Politician; Islamic scholar

Abdul Ghaffar Aziz (Urdu: عبدالغفار عزیز; Abdul Ghaffar Aziz, 1962 - 5 October 2020) was a Pakistani politician, Islamic scholar and deputy emir of Jamaat-e-Islami Pakistan from April 2019 to 5 October 2020 until his death. He was also Director of Foreign Affairs of JI for over two decades.

Aziz was appointed Deputy Emir of JI in April 2019 alongside Liaqat Baloch, Muhammad Ibrahim Khan, Rashid Naseem, Asadullah Bhutto, Farid Ahmad Paracha, Mian Muhammad Aslam and Merajul Huda Siddiqui.

== Death and illness ==
Aziz died on 5 October 2020 due to cancer. According to JI spokesman Qaisar Sharif, Abdul Ghaffar Aziz had been suffering from cancer for a year. His funeral prayer was led by his brother Habib-ur-Rahman in Mansoorah, Lahore. JI Emir Sirajul Haq, General secretary Ameer ul Azeem and thousands of others participated in his funeral.
