= Munawar Hasan =

Pakistani politician (1941–2020)

Syed Munawar Hasan
- سید منور حسن

4th Emir of Jamaat-e-Islami
- In office 29 March 2009 – 29 March 2014
- Preceded by: Qazi Hussain Ahmad
- Succeeded by: Siraj-ul-Haq

Personal details
- Born: 5 August 1940 Delhi, British India
- Died: 26 June 2020 (aged 80) Karachi, Sindh, Pakistan
- Party: Jamaat-e-Islami
- Education: University of Karachi (BSc, MSc)
- Occupation: Religious leader, politician foreign policy commentator
- Profession: Professor, religious leader
- Nickname(s): Delhi wala Munoo Bhai

Syed Munawar Hasan (Urdu: سید منور حسن; 5 January 1940 – 26 June 2020) was a Pakistani politician who served as the 4th Emir of Jamaat-e-Islami from 2009 to 2014. He was elected as a member of the National Assembly of Pakistan from Karachi in 1977.

== Early life and education ==
Munawar Hasan was born in Delhi, British India on 5 August 1941. During the partition of India, he migrated with his family and settled in Karachi. He obtained a Master's degree in sociology in 1963 and in Islamic Studies in 1966 from the University of Karachi. Hasan became the Karachi president of the National Students Federation in 1959.

== Political career ==
He joined Islami Jamiat-e-Talaba in 1960 and became president of its University of Karachi unit in 1962, Karachi chapter in 1963, and a member of its Central Executive Council. He became its national president in 1964 and served in that capacity for three consecutive terms. During his tenure, the Jamiat organised several campaigns mobilising public opinion regarding education issues.

Hasan became a member of Jamaat-e-Islami Pakistan in 1967. He served the Karachi unit as Assistant Secretary, Secretary, Deputy Ameer and Ameer of the city. He was then elected to the Central Shura and the Executive Council of the Jamaat. He represented the group at several platforms, including United Democratic Front and the Pakistan National Alliance formed by many Pakistani political parties. He ran for the NA-191 Karachi-IX seat of the National Assembly of Pakistan in 1977 and secured the highest vote tally in Pakistan. He was Assistant Secretary General of Jamaat-e-Islami Pakistan in 1992–93 and became Secretary General in 1993. He was elected Emir or head of the party in 2009.

After Jamaat-e-Islami Pakistan's loss in the 2013 Pakistani general election, Hasan accepted responsibility and offered to resign from his position, but the party's Executive Council refused this.

In March 2014, Hasan became the first head in the history of JI to be voted out of office when Siraj-ul-Haq Khan was elected head by the members with voting rights. At least one analyst, Nasir Jamal, attributed the change in leadership to JI Arakeen's desire for a younger and more pragmatic leader.

== Academic career ==
He joined the Islamic Research Academy and later Islamic Jerusalem Studies, at Karachi as a research assistant in 1963. He became its secretary general in 1969. Under his supervision, the academy published 70 scholarly books. He also served as managing editor of The Criterion and The Universal Message, Karachi.

== Personal life ==
He was known for his simple living style and was cited as an example, "For decades he lived in a two-room portion in the house of Jamaat leader Naimatullah Khan in Karachi, content with the stipend from his party." Munawar Hasan had always been more of an ideologue rather than a pragmatic leader trying to form political alliances with other parties in Pakistan.

== Death ==
On 11 June 2020, JI Karachi-chapter leader confirmed that Hasan had contracted COVID-19, and was in ICU. He died on 26 June in Karachi.

== Controversies ==
In November 2013, Hasan called Hakimullah Mehsud, slain leader of Tehrik-e-Taleban Pakistan, a martyr. This statement proved to be controversial in Pakistan. The Inter-Services Public Relations, the media wing of Pakistan Armed Forces, said this insulted the civilians and soldiers killed in Pakistan's war against terror and demanded that he apologise.

== See also ==
- Naeem Siddiqui
- Jamaat-e-Islami Pakistan
- Ghafoor Ahmed
- Qazi Hussain Ahmad
- Liaqat Baloch
- Sayyid Abul Ala Maududi

Party political offices
Preceded by Qazi Hussain Ahmad	Ameer of Jamaat-e-Islami; 2009–2014	Succeeded by Siraj ul Haq
