= Muhammad Athar Qureshi =

Pakistani politician (1925–2000)

Pakistan National Alliance General Secretary (Sindh)
- In office 1977–1978

Member of Sindh Provincial Assembly
- In office 1985–1988
- Constituency: PS-84

Islami Jamhoori Ittehad General Secretary (Sindh)
- In office 1988–1992

Personal details
- Born: 1925 Azamgarh district, Uttar Pradesh, British India
- Died: 18 December 2000 (aged 74–75) Karachi, Pakistan
- Party: Jamaat-e-Islami Pakistan (Until 1994), Tehreek-e-Islami (1994-2000)

Muhammad Athar Qureshi (Urdu: محمد اطہر قریشی ; 1925 – 18 December 2000) was a prominent Pakistani politician and religious leader. A member of Jamaat-e-Islami, he was also elected as a member of Sindh Provincial Assembly from 1985 to 1988.

== Early life ==
Qureshi was born in 1925 in the Azamgarh district of Uttar Pradesh, British India, and attended Aligarh Muslim University. He migrated to Karachi along with his family in the early 1950s.

== Political life ==
Muhammad Athar Qureshi became politically active at Aligarh University, where he joined student wing of the Muslim League. Later, he became part of Jamaat-e-Islami Pakistan under the leadership of Abul A'la Maududi along with Abdul Ghafoor Ahmed. In the 1970s, he was elected as the General Secretary of the party. In 1985, he was elected as a Member of the Sindh Provincial Assembly, representing the PS-84 Constituency.

He subsequently left Jamaat-e-Islami and joined Tehreek-Islami along with Naeem Siddiqui, serving as chief for the provinces of Sindh and Balochistan.

== Death ==
On the morning of 18 December 2000, Qureshi was walking to the Madinah Mosque outside his residence in central Karachi when he was assassinated in front of his residence in North Nazimabad, Karachi.

== Funeral ==
Muhammad Athar Qureshi's funeral took place in Karachi and was attended by hundreds of party workers along with top leadership of known political parties of Pakistan such as Pakistan Muslim League, Jamaat-e-Islami Pakistan, Pakistan Peoples Party, and Muttahida Qaumi Movement – Pakistan. He was buried in Sakhi Hasan graveyard in Karachi. On his death, several condolence messages were sent to his family by Qazi Hussain Ahmed, Benazir Bhutto, Pir of Pagaro VII, and Altaf Hussain (Pakistani politician).
