= Train march =

Protest march

Train March
- Date: June 25-27, 2022
- Venue: Various railway stations across Pakistan
- Location: Pakistan
- Type: Political rally
- Theme: Protest against inflation, corruption, and interest-based economy
- Cause: Economic challenges in Pakistan
- Organized by: Jamaat-e-Islami Pakistan
- Participants: Sirajul Haq, JI workers, and supporters
- Outcome: Raised awareness about economic issues

The "Train March" was a march led by Sirajul Haq then Amir Jamaat-e-Islami Pakistan. The purpose of the march was to protest against inflation, corruption and interest-based economy in Pakistan. It started on 25 June 2022 with Rahim Yar Khan and continued till 27 June 2022. Addressing a press conference in Lahore before the march, Jamaat-e-Islami Naib Amir Liaqat Baloch said that Amir Sirajul Haque will address 50 big and small places during the march.

== Background ==
The Train March was announced by Sirajul Haq in response to the rising inflation, corruption and economic challenges faced by the people of Pakistan. The purpose of the march was to create awareness and put pressure on the government to address these issues.

== Route and schedule ==
The march started from Rahim Yar Khan railway station and stopped at various big and small places where Sirajul Haq addressed the participants. The train left Multan for Lahore on June 26 and in the final phase, it left for Rawalpindi by Railcar Express on June 27.

== Impact ==
The Train March highlighted the inefficiencies of Pakistan Railways (PR) and the challenges faced by the participants during the journey. The march also received support from other political parties, such as the Islamic Democratic Alliance (IJI), who announced their participation in the march.
