= Muttahida Majlis-e-Amal =

Pakistani political alliance

Muttahida Majlis-e-Amal متحدہ مجلسِ عمل
- President: Fazl-ur-Rahman
- Founder: Shah Ahmad Nurani; Qazi Hussain Ahmad
- Founded: 2002; 24 years ago
- Dissolved: 2019; 7 years ago
- Ideology: Islamism; Islamic conservatism Social conservatism
- Political position: Right-wing to far-right
- Religion: Islam
- National affiliation: PDM
- Members: JUI (F); Tehreek-e-Jafaria Pakistan; Jamiat Ulema-e-Pakistan; Tehreek e Islami; Markazi Jamiat Ahle Hadith
- Colors: Green, White, Black
- Slogan: "Nizam-e-Mustafa is the solution." Urdu: نظام مصطفی ہی حل ہے (lit. 'The system of the Prophet Muhammad is solution.')

Election symbol
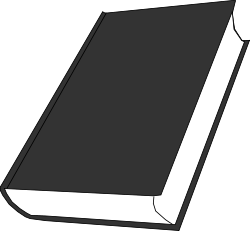
- Book

Member parties' flags
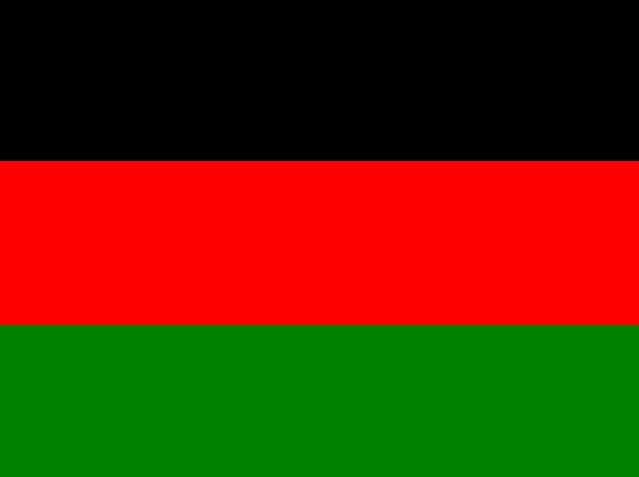

The Muttahida Majlis-e-Amal (MMA; Urdu: متحدہ مجلسِ عمل, lit. 'United Assembly of Action') is a political alliance consisting of conservative, Islamist, religious, and right-wing parties of Pakistan. Naeem Siddiqui (the founder of Tehreek-e-Islami) proposed such an alliance of all the religious parties back in the 1990s.

Qazi Hussain Ahmad endeavored for it and due to his efforts, it was formed in 2002 in a direct opposition to the policies led by President Pervez Musharraf to support for the War in Afghanistan. The alliance more densely consolidated its position during the nationwide general elections held in 2002. The JUI(F) led by its leader, the cleric Fazl-ur-Rahman, retained most of the political momentum in the alliance. The MMA retained the provisional government of Khyber–Pakhtunkhwa and remained in alliance with PMLQ in Balochistan. Much public criticism and disapproval nonetheless grew against the alliance.

Despite its conservatism, the alliance survived for a short period of time, when the JUI(F) left the alliance over the political disagreement on the issues of boycotting the general elections held in 2008. The JUI(F) later becoming an integral part in the government led by the left-wing Pakistan Peoples Party (PPP) and refused to revive the alliance in 2012, before the upcoming 2013 elections, in opposition to PPP.

== Background ==
=== Historical and academic accounts ===
The MMA conglomeration of distinct Islamist parties that ran under a single banner during the nationwide general elections held in 2002. Islamist movements are defined as those which derive inspiration from the Islamic scriptures, the Qur'an and Hadith, and then vie to come to power in a state. Historically, the literature concerning Islamism and Muslim political institutions has been propagated via the Orientalist discourse, where the rejection of certain post-Enlightenment, national, and secular values has been translated into such movements' nature.

In fact, much of Islamism and its ideology are critiqued as a launching pad for fundamentalism and radicalism, as political movements such as Hezbollah, Hamas, and the 'Islamic' revolution of Iran are highlighted. However, social science and ethnographic work has proven that Islamism emerges from middle-class lay intellectuals concentrated in urban centers.

=== Activism and politics ===
The Islamic political parties united on a single platform in 1993 as "Islamic Front" but competition ensued between conservative PML(N) and leftist PPP forced the front into split when the JUI(F) decided to opt in support of Benazir Bhutto of PPP against the Pakistan Muslim League. Overall in the 1990s, the Islamic influence in the politics was very limited in the public.

After the deadly terrorist attacks on the United States in September 2001, the religious extremism began to grow in a military response to these attacks. The Islamic political parties formed the think tank, known as Pakistan-Afghanistan Defense Council (later known as Pakistan Defence Council), yet the formation of the MMA in 2001 was the first time such a coalition entered the electoral process.

Despite its huge mass, populism, and support, the MMA alliance only retained 63 seats whilst the PPP retained 94 seats and the President Musharraf's PML(Q) securing 124 seats during the general elections held in 2002. The alliance comprised the following notable groups:

1. Jamiat Ulema-e-Pakistan (JUP): A traditional Sunni-(Aqeeda-e-Sawad-e-Azam of Aaulia, Sufia) political party which is popular with traditional and folk Muslims in rural areas of Sindh and Punjab. They chant the slogan Ya Rasool Allah tere chahne walon ki khair as the 'love slogan' of their party.
2. The Jamiat Ulama-e-Islam: The party is led by Fazal-ur-Rehman who became widely known for his vocal and strong support for Benazir Bhutto and the Pakistan Peoples Party in the 1990s. The JUI(F) was politically influential, got more hardlines, and had traditional stream of thinking – with popular appeal amongst clerics, Pashtuns and Baloch of Khyber Pakhtunkhwa and Balochistan. The JUI(F) later became an integral part in PPP led government formed in 2008–13.
3. Tehrik-e-Jafaria Pakistan (TJP): The party is led by Syed Sajid Ali Naqvi. The Shiite and ultraconservative party that played a crucial role in uniting the Shia masses to offer support to MMA. Its political influence was also less in the alliance's political shifts. Historically, it has foreign support and ties with Iran.
4. Jamiat Ahle Hadith (JAH): Although a missionary political party, the JAH derives itself from the Ahl-al-Hadith movement.

== Rise to power ==
The success of MMA can be attributed to the context-specific, political environment of the 2002 elections, due to the region's geopolitical significance following the Afghanistan invasion, military-civilian relations, and the threat of religion under secular authoritarian rule. Leading up to the 2002 elections, the PPP and the PML-N were severely handicapped as elite members of their respective parties were charged with corruption under the military regime, and thus, under the Legal Framework Ordinances (LFO), were rendered incapable of running for office.

In addition, the government exempted the MMA from standard campaign conduct, for their use of loudspeakers, street rallies, and anti-government inflammatory rhetoric which was not objected to by the government.

Another form of assistance from the government came in the revision of article 8a of the constitution, where a graduation clause required degrees from accredited universities, which included JI and JIU-F affiliated 'madaris', for participation in the electoral process. Such a clause restricted the ANP in its strongholds in Khyber Pakhtunkhwa and Balochistan, and thus favored the MMA.

However, in addition to the military prioritizing and providing several concessions to the MMA in its rise to legitimacy, ideological pragmatism as a campaign strategy lifted the 5 party alliance into Pakistan's mainstream political institutions. Given the destabilized nature of the PPP and PML-N, the MMA benefited from the "ideological bankruptcy," monopolizing on the public's sentiment towards the U.S. involvement in Afghanistan. Also, in public, the MMA remained confrontational and opposed Musharraf for his partnership with the U.S., his promotion of "enlightened moderation", and his refusal to take off his uniform despite making several promises to do so. The MMA's political program highlighted its nationalist, populist tendencies, while hindering its religious rhetoric. Leading up to the elections, the MMA composed a 15-point manifesto as follows:

1. To revive fear of God, affection to the Islamic Prophet Mohammed and service to people with particular emphasis on government officials and cabinet members.
2. To make Pakistan a true Islamic welfare state to ensure justice to people and eradicate corruption whatsoever.
3. To ensure provision of bread, clothes, shelter, education, jobs and marriage expenses to all citizens.
4. To protect basic human rights (life, property and honour) of citizens
5. To create an independent, just and humane economic system where citizens will be provided opportunities for 'halal' (legitimate) jobs, business, and investments.
6. To ensure uniform and quick justice to every citizen, from the president to a layman.
7. To develop God-fearing, helping, brave and protecting police system.
8. To get the entire society literate within ten years to enable everyone to know one's rights and responsibilities.
9. To ensure compulsory and free of charge education up to matriculation (high school level) and provide opportunities to meritorious students and scholars for advanced research.
10. To protect rights of women guaranteed by Islam and restoration of their honour and prestige.
11. To abolish all chronic and new feudal systems with forfeiture of illegal wealth and its distribution among the poor.
12. To provide lands to peasants and farmers for their livelihood and guarantee reasonable prices for their produce.
13. To protect provincial autonomy and district governments, taking care of backward areas and classes and taking special steps to get them at par with developed areas.
14. To get the country and people rid of imperialistic forces and their local agents.
15. To extend moral, political and diplomatic help and support to all suppressed with particular emphasis on Kashmiris, Palestinians, and Afghans.

The MMA's manifesto relies on heavy promises towards social services, eradication of foreign imperialism, extinguish corruption and exercise justice, while highlighting local and international struggles towards autonomy. Although the implementations of Shari'a and gender segregation were cornerstones to the MMA's ideology, such goals were vague and rarely highlighted during election campaigns. In addition, its relative passiveness against Musharraf's incumbent regime helped the party's cause, such as exemption from restrictions on public rallies and madrassa registration.

Such political strategies worked for the MMA in Balochistan and the Khyber Pakhtunkhwa. Due to the Balochi nationalists' fragmentation following the withdrawal of the Soviets from the region and its failure to denounce the U.S. invasion of Afghanistan, the Balochi incumbents were viewed as Musharraf sympathizers. In the Khyber Pakhtunkhwa, the MMA performed well due to the high number of Pakhtuns, who received the MMA's policies towards anti-imperialism well. The coalition consisted of large numbers of ethnic Pakhtuns, and thus was active in organizing demonstrations against the plight of Afghan Pakhtuns under siege. In Sindh, the MMA won popular support, and five out of twenty National Assembly seats, by attacking the incumbent party, the MQM. Highlighting their history of extortion and lack of progress towards addressing social concerns, the MMA rallied the masses through its 'madaris' networks to voice their position and pile up votes on Election Day.

Through utilizing the several concessions made by the military regime, exploiting ideological and public weaknesses of incumbent parties, and politicizing the Afghan invasion, the MMA was able to secure eleven percent of the popular vote and 58 seats in the National Assembly. Given the conditions of the election, which were limited and not free under the watchful eye of the military-government, the MMA's ascension does not seem as surprising. However, in the following years, leading up to the 2008 election, the MMA was further exposed to the public and held publicly accountable.

== Collapse of MMA ==
The MMA's success in the Khyber-Pakhtunkhwa, Balochistan, and the city government of Karachi were the transient events, as seen in the alliance's split in the 2005 elections and official collapse in the 2008 elections.

Over the years, the public disapproval of MMA nonetheless grew and found itself in a tough situation in its competition with more resourceful and influential Alliance for Restoration of Democracy. Although the Military-MMA relationship is pertinent to the party's demise, the MMA's fate can be more accurately ascribed to its relationship to other secular institutions, individual and organizational corruption, and competing Islamisms. The MMA's actions while serving in the government portray the party's ideological fissures, its inadequacy in serving the public and delivering campaign promises, and its illiteracy in realpolitik. With such exposed shortcomings while serving as constituents in Pakistan's democratic institutions, the MMA was evaluated on the basis of its performance, and was duly rejected in the subsequent provincial and national elections.

== Restoration ==
The restoration of MMA took place on 9 November 2017 in a second meeting at Mansoorah, Lahore in the presence of five Islamic parties Jamiat Ulama-e-Islam, Jamaat-e-Islami (no longer part of the coalition), Markazi Jamiat Ahle Hadith, Islami Tehreek and Jamiat Ulema-e-Pakistan and other religious parties. While the formal announcement took place on 14 December 2017 at Karachi and thus MMA was revived.

Fazal-ur-Rehman became head of MMA in March 2018, a political alliance of above-mentioned 5 religious parties. Alliance's five parties would have one election symbol, one flag and one election campaign manifesto.

On 11 March 2019, Jamaat-e-Islami (JI) has formally parted ways with Muttahida Majlis-e-Amal (MMA). "The JI will not conduct any future programme under the banner of the MMA," announced the JI Central Executive Council (Shoora).

== Electoral history ==
=== National Assembly Elections ===
Election	Presiding chair of the party	Votes	%	Seats	+/–	Result
2002	Maulana Fazl-ur-Rehman	3,335,643	11.41%	59 / 342	▲59	Coalition Government
2008	Maulana Fazl-ur-Rehman	769,638	2.22%	7 / 342	▼52	Coalition Government
2018	Maulana Fazl-ur-Rehman	2,573,939	4.85%	15 / 342	▲15	Opposition (till 11 April 2022)
2018	Maulana Fazl-ur-Rehman	2,573,939	4.85%	15 / 342	▲15	Coalition Partner (from 11 April 2022)

=== Senate Elections ===
Election	Presiding chair of the party	Seats	+/–	Result
2021	Maulana Fazl-ur-Rehman	6 / 100	▲6	Opposition

=== KP Assembly Elections ===
Election	Presiding chair of the party	Votes	%	Seats	+/–	Result
2002	Maulana Fazl-ur-Rehman	792,949	26.39%	54 / 124	▲54	Government
2008	Maulana Fazl-ur-Rehman	500,479	14.46%	12 / 124	▼42	Opposition
2018	Maulana Fazl-ur-Rehman	1,126,445	17.08%	18 / 145	▲18	Opposition

=== Balochistan Assembly Elections ===
Election	Presiding chair of the party	Votes	%	Seats	+/–	Result
2002	Maulana Fazl-ur-Rehman	188,878	16.64%	16 / 51	▲6	Coalition Government
2008	Maulana Fazl-ur-Rehman	193,876	14.64%	8 / 51	▼8	Opposition
2018	Maulana Fazl-ur-Rehman	277,659	15.28%	10 / 51	▲10	Opposition

== See also ==
- Naeem Siddiqui
- Milli Yekjehti Council
- Mutahida Deeni Mahaz
- Qazi Hussain Ahmad
- Prof. Ghafoor Ahmed
- Khurshid Ahmad
- Majlis-e-Ahrar-ul-Islam
- Liaqat Baloch
- Women's Protection Bill
- Ali Haider Noor Khan Niazi
- List of Islamic political parties
