= Mian Tufail Mohammad =

Pakistani politician (1914–2009)

- میاں طفیل محمد

Secretary General of Jamaat-e-Islami
- In office March 1944 – December 1965

Emir of Jamaat-e-Islami in West Pakistan
- In office January 1966 – October 1972

Emir of Jamaat-e-Islami
- In office October 1972 – 7 October 1987
- Preceded by: Sayyid Abul A'la Maududi
- Succeeded by: Qazi Hussain Ahmad

Personal details
- Born: April 1914 Kapurthala, Punjab, British India
- Died: 25 June 2009 (aged 95) Lahore, Punjab, Pakistan
- Party: Jamaat-e-Islami
- Education: Government College University Lahore(BA (Hons) degree in Physics and Mathematics in 1935); Punjab University Law College (LL.B. degree in 1937)
- Profession: Lawyer, religious leader

Mian Tufail Mohammad (Urdu: میاں طفيل محمد) (April 1914 – 25 June 2009) was a Pakistani religious leader, lawyer, Islamic theologian, and former Secretary General and Emir of Jamaat-e-Islami Pakistan party.

== Early life and career ==
He was born in 1914 in Kapurthala, Jalandhar district, in an Arain family, in Punjab, British India. He received his education and college degrees in Lahore. Then he became an active member of Jamaat-e-Islami Hind. Like Maulana Naeem Siddiqui, he also worked closely with Abul Ala Maududi.

He was appointed the first permanent Secretary General of Jamaat-e-Islami Hind in March 1944. He, then, gave up his business and moved to Darussalam in Pathankot, East Punjab. Then he worked as Secretary General of the party until 1965. He served as the leader (Ameer) of the party from 1966 to 1972 of West Pakistan. After Maulana Maududi resigned as the leader of the party in October 1972, for health reasons, Mian Tufail Mohammad was elected the leader for five years. Later, he was elected as the leader of the party for two more terms. In 1987, after being ill for a long time, he refused further service for the party and Qazi Hussain Ahmad was elected to be the leader of the party.

Some people criticized him for having a 'soft tilt' as a strategy towards the military government of General Zia Ul-Haq. He was criticized for this by people both within his party and by the circles outside his pary in Pakistan.

== Agitation for democracy ==
In 1965, the joint opposition against Ayub Khan was organised, he was one of its central leaders. Along with other leaders of the Combined Opposition Parties coalition, Mian Tufail toured both East Pakistan and West Pakistan to create mass awareness and organise a strong national democratic movement.

== Books ==
Mian Tufail Mohammad co-authored with Abul A'la Maududi and Amin Ahsan Islahi the following books:

- Kashful Mahjub: An Urdu commentary
- Daw'at-e-Islami and Its Demands (Urdu)

Several biographies have been written on his life and work. The most prominent ones are the following:

- Mushahidaat (Urdu)
- "Tufail Nama" (Urdu)
- "Tufail Qabila" (Urdu)
- "Raah-e-Nijat" (Urdu)

== Death ==
On 7 June 2009, he had a brain haemorrhage. He was hospitalised at Shaikh Zayed Hospital in Lahore, Pakistan. After staying in a coma for over 2 weeks, he died on 25 June 2009 at the age of 95. Among his survivors were eight daughters and four sons.

== Legacy ==
As one of the 75 founding members of Jamaat-e-Islami Hind, he will always be remembered in party history. His political legacy also descends down his family line. His son-in-law Ejaz Chaudhary is the Punjab president of Pakistan Tehreek-e-Insaf.

== See also ==
- Naeem Siddiqui
- Mian
- Abdul Ghafoor Ahmed
- Khurshid Ahmad
- Muttahida Majlis-e-Amal
- Politics of Pakistan
- List of political parties in Pakistan

Party political offices
Preceded by Abul Ala Maududi	Ameer of Jamaat-e-Islami; 1972–1987	Succeeded by Qazi Hussain Ahmad
