= Muhammad Ibrahim Khan (Pakistani senator) =

Pakistani politician

- پروفیسر محمد ابراہیم خان

Deputy Emir of Jamaat-e-Islami Pakistan
- In office April 2019 – Present

President of JIP KPK
- In office 2006–2012
- Preceded by: Mushtaq Ahmad Khan
- In office 2022–2026

Personal details
- Party: PRM (2026-present)
- Other political affiliations: JIP (2018-2025)
- Occupation: Politician

Muhammad Ibrahim Khan (پروفیسر محمد ابراہیم خان) is a Pakistani politician and deputy emir of Jamaat-e-Islami Pakistan since April 2019. Khan also served as a member of the Senate of Pakistan from March 2006 to March 2012.

He is also serving as president of Jamaat-e-Islami Khyber Pakhtunkhwa chapter since 19 April 2022.

== Early life and education ==
Ibrahim was born in 1952 in Bannu, in the Khyber Pakhtunkhwa province of Pakistan. He received his early education in his native town. He later attended Gomal University in Dera Ismail Khan, where he obtained a Bachelor of Laws (LLB) degree as well as a master’s degree in journalism.

== Academic career ==
After completing his education, Ibrahim joined the Department of Journalism and Mass Communication at Gomal University as a lecturer. He remained in this position for several years before leaving academia to pursue full-time political and organizational work.

== Political career ==
Ibrahim’s political involvement began during his student years when he became a member of Islami Jamiat Talaba, the student wing of Jamaat-e-Islami (JI). He later served the organization in various capacities. In 1987, he was appointed provincial secretary-general of Jamaat-e-Islami, a position he held until 1994. He was subsequently elevated to provincial president of the party, serving in this role until 2004. He was then succeeded by Siraj-ul-Haq.
