= Ejaz Chaudhary =

Pakistani politician

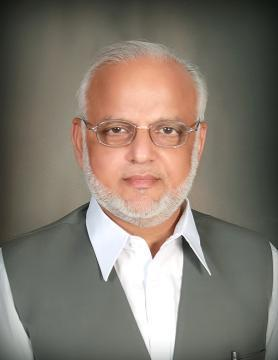

Member of the Senate of Pakistan
- In office 12 March 2021 – 22 July 2025
- Constituency: Punjab

President PTI Punjab, Pakistan
- In office July 2019 – 25 December 2021
- Succeeded by: Shafqat Mahmood
- In office 16 March 2013 – 23 May 2015
- Preceded by: Ahsan Rasheed

Personal details
- Born: 15 September 1956 (age 70) Lahore, Punjab, Pakistan
- Party: PTI (2007–present)
- Other political affiliations: JIP (1975–2007)
- Spouse: Salma Ejaz (m. 1984)
- Occupation: Politician, social worker
- Website: ejazchaudhary.com

Ejaz Ahmed Chaudhary, commonly referred to as Ejaz Chaudhary (born 15 September 1956), is a former Pakistani senator. In 2007 Chaudhary had joined Imran Khan's PTI. He has served as Imran Khan's chief political advisor, and served as the Punjab President of the party from 2013 to 2015. After becoming Punjab President he serves on both the central executive committee and core committee (Politburo).

In 2021, Ejaz Chaudhary was nominated by PTI to be its representative in the Senate of Pakistan representing Punjab. He won the Senate election from Punjab. In April 2021, Chaudhary was appointed by Prime Minister Imran Khan to the slot of parliamentary leader of the ruling party's caucus in the Pakistani Senate. He has been incarcerated since 2023 after the May 9 riots by the Lahore Anti-Terrorism Court to 10 years.

== Early life ==
Ejaz Ahmad Chaudhary was born in Lahore. He went to boarding school to Cadet College Kohat from where he did his Matriculation and F.Sc. He then did BSc in Civil Engineering from University of Engineering and Technology Lahore. Chaudhary is highly regarded by the Kamboh caste. his popularity in local politics has helped elect PTI officials as MPA's in Lahore, specifically in PP-147 and PP-148 where those castes form a majority.

== Personal life ==
Chaudhary married Salma Ejaz in 1984, his wife is the daughter of Mian Tufail Mohammad one of the original founding members and leader of Jamaat-e-Islami. Much of Chaudhary's early political career was in the Jamaat. Chaudhary is the founder and the chief executive officer of Kisan Care (pvt ltd) providing agricultural chemicals.

== Political career ==
=== Early career: Jamaat-e-Islami ===
Chaudhary started his political career in the Islami Jamiat-e-Talaba and had gradually progressed up the ranks of the party; he became national leader of the Islami Jamiat-e-Talaba. Chaudhary and General Zia-ul-Haq were initially on good terms as Zia was keen to placate the religious right. However Chaudhary fast became disillusioned with Zia's undemocratic ways and as leader of the youth wing, Chaudhary dissented from the majority of the senior leadership as he opposed the regime of dictator General Zia-ul-Haq. Chaudhary organised protests in his native Lahore as national leader of the Jamaat's youth wing, General Zia soon ordered repression of the protests and Chaudhary along with his leaders and followers were tortured and imprisoned by the regime police and security services.

The death of General Zia in 1988 breathed new life into Pakistan's faltering democracy; during this period Chaudhary served as deputy mayor of Lahore in the early 1990s. Chaudhary continued to rise in the party's ranks and by 1998 he was appointed to the Central Executive Committee (the top decision-making body of the party) Chaudhary continued to dissent in the 1990s from official party line on many cases; he voted against the Jamaat forming a coalition with the Pakistan Muslim League (N) for the 1999 elections while on the Central Executive Committee; however, the Jamaat formed an alliance; by this time Chaudhary had become disillusioned with the Jamaat as he felt that the party had lost its way in protecting the national interests of Pakistan, he left the party in 2006. Upon the death of Qazi Hussain Ahmed (the man who Chaudhary fell out with over his moderate approach compared to Ahmed's more conservative approach) it became evidently clear the two men had managed to reconcile their differences at some point while Chaudhary had still defected to PTI.

Chaudhary's political views are frequently described as moderate, based on the principals of Islam and of communal tolerance.

=== Pakistan Tehreek-e-Insaf: 2007–present ===
By September 2007, Chaudhary joined Pakistan Tehreek-e-Insaf after receiving a personal invitation from Khan himself to join the party. Since then has risen through the party's ranks serving as Punjab vice-president, chief political advisor, spokesperson on religious affairs and Punjab President.

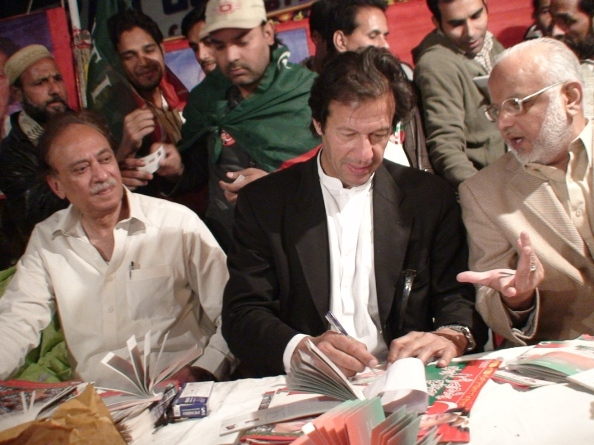
Then Vice-president Ejaz Chaudhary is on the right, Imran Khan (centre), on the left is Ahsan Rasheed (former Punjab President, Chaudhary defeated Rasheed in the 2013 intra-party elections)

He served as the spokesperson for religious affairs, former central vice-president (Punjab) of the party, currently President of Punjab and is also currently responsible for organising PTI in southern parts of Punjab province. By mid-2012, Chaudhary's efforts had paid off and PTI became the dominant party in the southern parts of Punjab province, reflected in polls by International Republican Institute which showed the gap between PTI and PML-N had close significantly in Punjab, a direct result of the vice-president's efforts. By July 2012, the vice-president began to focus efforts in his native city of Lahore to ensure the gap between PTI and the other parties closes even more by the approaching general election.

Chaudhary won the PTI intra-party elections, scoring victories in three out of four regions in Punjab province, electing him to the higher position of President of PTI in Punjab and his panel including Dr Yasmeen Rashid as general secretary in Punjab.

On 2 February 2014, Chaudhary made it evidently clear that Imran Khan would not be negotiating for the Taliban in the peace process; he stated that Khan, himself and PTI were happy to facilitate the process but could not get involved directly because PTI did not have the constitutional legitimacy to lead the process, which was to be led by PML-N. He also stated that the Taliban should not require Imran Khan to negotiate on their behalf, but rather members of the Taliban should involve themselves because the peace talks were more likely to come to fruition.

A bill against domestic violence had been sent by Chaudhary to the Punjab assembly, which after pending a vote for 3 years was approved by the government and opposition.

Chaudhary, along with Yasmin Rashid were instrumental in making PTI the first political party both in Pakistan and the sub-continent to have audited ISO-9000 certificates issued by an international firm, further bolstering the PTI's claim to be an anti-corruption party.

Following the elections, he served as additional secretary general of PTI on a national level. He was appointed to the position of President of PTI (Central Punjab) in 2019.

In February 2021, Chaudhary's name was floated as a potential candidate for deputy chairman of the Pakistani senate. Eventually Chaudhary was confirmed as the PTI government's parliamentary leader in the senate.

=== Pakistan Tehreek-e-Insaf: Past contributions ===
Shortly after joining Pakistan Tehreek-e-Insaf, Chaudhary took charge of establishing the Insaf Students Federation (ISF). After successfully preparing the student youth wing structure in Pakistan's important universities, he supported the youth wing's position while Punjab president of PTI.

Ejaz Chaudhary also co-founded the Kisan Insaf Mahaz (KAM) which servesas a platform for empowering the farmers' community in Pakistan, his role in Pakistan's agriculture reflected his family's heritage as well as his power as PTI leader in Punjab regions

Following the scandal after an attempted assassination on Hamid Mir and the Geo-ISI rivalry, Ejaz Chaudhary challenged Geo's journalist Ifitkhar Ahmed to a debate over Geo's allegations against the ISI and on the role of rigging in elections. Iftikhar Ahmed has not responded to the challenge Chaudhary and fellow party ally Shah Mehmood Qureshi were influential in getting the PML-Q and the MWM (Pakistan's main Shia party) to support the PTI on a campaign against election rigging.

Chaudhary is a former deputy mayor of Lahore. In 2018, he was a candidate for PTI in NA-133 (Lahore-XI) but narrowly lost to Muhammad Pervaiz Malik.

== Philanthropy ==
In his early career Ejaz Chaudhary worked for the Jamaat-e-Islami charities in 1985 he was appointed head to the Majlis Khidmat e Islami (the main Jamaat-e-Islami) charity, they provided free medical aid, blood transfusion's and ambulance to the poor in Lahore also the charity helped to provide emergency relief to those who suffered from natural disasters such as earthquakes and floods, furthermore Chaudhary has been vocally advocating for improved conditions in the Pakistani jail system, which is closely linked to the justice system. In August 2012 Chaudhary strongly condemned the attacks against Pakistan's Shia' community in Gilgit-Baltistan which killed 25 Shia Muslims.
