= JIY =

JIY, Jiy, or jiy can refer to:

- Jiy, a place in Azerbaijan
- Jino language, a pair of languages spoken in Yunnan province, China, by ISO 639 code
- JI Youth, the youth wing of the Islamist political party Jamaat-e-Islami from Pakistan
- Jieyang, a prefecture-level city in Guangdong province, China; see List of administrative divisions of Guangdong
