= Institute of Policy Studies =

Institute of Policy Studies may refer to

- Institute of Policy Studies (Pakistan) in Islamabad
- Institute of Policy Studies (Singapore)

== See also ==
- Institute for Policy Studies in the United States
