= National Labour Federation =

National Labour Federation may be:

- National Labor Federation in Eretz-Israel
- National Labour Federation Pakistan
- National Labour Federation (UK), a defunct general union
- National Labor Federation

== See also ==
- Trades Union Congress
