= Hira Schools & Colleges =

Hira Schools (Pakistan)
- Pakistan

Information
- Type: Private
- Motto: I am to Learn
- Established: 1997
- Faculty: 3,500
- Enrollment: 60,000
- Average class size: Preschool - A Levels
- Campus: 215+
- Colors: Maroon, Scarlet, White And Grey
- Athletics: Citizens
- Mascot: Flamingo
- Website: Official Website

Hira Schools in Pakistan are a Jamaat-e-Islami Pakistan-sponsored Islamic school system that operates more than 215 schools and 10 colleges across Pakistan. It is a universal education project run by the Hira National Education Foundation, a non-governmental, non-profit and non-sectarian organization working in the field of education since 1997.

The project is sponsored by Jamaat-e-Islami Pakistan. The system has branches in all four Pakistani provinces, including Kashmir, FATA and Gilgit-Baltistan. The system offers education ranging from preschool to secondary level in addition to a program of preparatory courses towards the completion of a Secondary School Certificate. Hira Schools maintain low tuition fees to allow low-income students to enroll.

== History ==
Tanzeem-e-Asatiza Pakistan (Teachers Association of Pakistan), a teacher wing of Jamaat-e-Islami Pakistan, introduced the Hira educational project in the late 1990s.

== Enrollment ==
It operates 215 schools and 10 colleges across the country. The system employs 2,045 male and 1,415 female teachers who provide instruction to the 32,000 male and 28,700 female students.

== Organizational structure ==
The Hira Educational Foundation organizes all the branches, develops curriculum, conducts faculty training and inspects schools.

== Curriculum ==
The curriculum is provided by the Association For Academic Quality (AFAQ) and includes AFAQ's Sun Series and AFAQ's Iqbal Series of textbooks.

== See also ==
- Alkhidmat Foundation
- Jamaat-e- Islami Pakistan
- Hira Model High School Mandani
