= Milli Yakjehti Council =

The Milli Yakjehti Council (Urdu: ملی یکجہتی کونسل, MYC, also called the National Alliance for Religious Harmony) is a Pakistani non-political alliance of political and non-political religious parties formed in 1995 on the advice of Maulana Naeem Siddiqui (the founder of Tehreek-e-Jafaria) to unite religious parties and reduce sectarian tensions in the nation.

In 1996, the MYC adopted a resolution objecting to a planned Pakistan nuclear treaty, and calling for a nuclear device to be tested.

In 2012, the party was described as "recently revived", and elected former Jamiat-i-Islami chief Qazi Hussain Ahmed as president.
