= Liaqat Baloch =

Pakistani politician (born 1952)

- لیاقت بلوچ
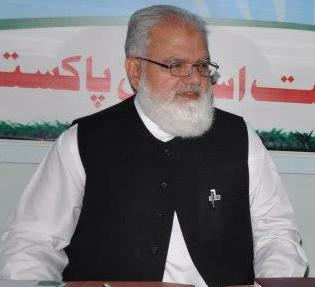
- Baloch in c. 2014

Naib Amir of JIP
- In office 21 May 2019 – 11 October 2025
- Preceded by: Khurshid Ahmad

Secretary General of JI
- In office May 2009 – 27 April 2019
- Succeeded by: Ameer ul Azeem

Member of the National Assembly of Pakistan
- In office 18 November 2002 – 23 July 2007
- Constituency: NA-126 (Lahore-IX)
- In office 3 November 1990 – 16 October 1993
- In office 21 March 1985 – 2 December 1988
- Constituency: Lahore

Personal details
- Born: 9 December 1952 (age 73) Muzaffargarh, Punjab, Pakistan
- Party: JIP (1983-present)
- Website: liaqatbaloch.com

Liaqat Baloch (Urdu: لیاقت بلوچ; born 9 December 1952) is a Pakistani political leader, who is currently serving as the Naib Ameer of Jamaat-e-Islami Pakistan, a Pakistani Islamic religio-political party.

He was also the secretary-general of the Muttahida Majlis-e-Amal (MMA) and the deputy leader of the opposition in the National Assembly.

A member of the Pakistani parliament in 1985, 1990 and 2002, Baloch had also served as the Secretary General of Jamaat-e-Islami until 2019.

== Early life and family ==
He is originally from Muzaffargarh, a remote area of southern Punjab – although his family's origins are in the nearby province of Balochistan. Today, Baloch lives in Lahore.

He holds an Master of Arts and LLB degree from the University of the Punjab.

His sister-in-law is Dr Tahira Basharat, an important figure attached to the department of Islamic Studies at the University of the Punjab, where she served as Professor and Dean.

== Political career ==
He played an active role in student politics in the late 1970s, and at the University of the Punjab he was elected president of the Students' union in 1976.

He was also elected the all Pakistan president of Islami Jamiat-e-Talaba in 1977 and 1978.

== Writings ==
- Rushaniyun Ka Safar (Journey of Enlightenment), in Salim Mansur Khalid, ed., Talabah Tahrikain (Student Movements) 2: 219-30. Lahore: Al-Badr Publications, 1989.

== See also ==
- Naeem Siddiqui
- Tehreek-e-Islami
- Abdul Ghafoor Ahmed
- Islami Jamiat-e-Talaba
- Jamaat-e-Islami Pakistan
- Khurshid Ahmad
- Muttahida Majlis-e-Amal
- Sayyid Abul Ala Maududi
- Politics of Pakistan
- Qazi Hussain Ahmad
- List of political parties in Pakistan
