= Merajuddin Khan =

Merajuddin Khan was a political leader in Pakistan. He was born on February 15, 1958, and was originally from Khairabad, Nowshera District, Khyber Pakhtunkhwa.

He played an active role in student politics in the late 1980s. He also elected Central president of Islami Jamiat-e-Talaba Pakistan during 1982–1984. He held LLB from Law College Karachi and MA (History & Islamic Education)from University of Peshawar.

Later, Mr Merajuddin Khan joined Jamaat-e-Islami Pakistan for professional politics and become Provincial Vice-president of Jamaat-e-Islami KP. He also served as Member of Central Core-Committee of Jamaat-e-Islami Pakistan several times.

Also, he was the founding director of a well known chain of schools in KP by the name of Iqra School & College Iqra Education System KP.

He died on March 5, 2016, at Haripur while coming back from a party meeting and was buried in hometown Khairabad, District Nowshera KP.
