= Juy =

Juy may refer to:

- Juy, Yardymli, a village in Azerbaijan
- Juray language
- Lucien Juy, French industrialist
