= Mushtaq Ahmad Khan =

Pakistani politician (born 1974)

Member of the Senate of Pakistan
- In office 12 March 2018 – 12 March 2024
- Constituency: Khyber Pakhtunkhwa (general seat)

President of Jamaat-e-Islami in Khyber Pakhtunkhwa
- In office October 2021 – 19 April 2022
- Succeeded by: Muhammad Ibrahim Khan

Personal details
- Born: 3 March 1974 (age 52) Sheikh Jana, Swabi District, North-West Frontier Province, Pakistan
- Party: PRM (2026–present)
- Other political affiliations: JIP (2018–2025)
- Education: Government Post Graduate College, Swabi; University of Peshawar

Mushtaq Ahmad Khan (Note: Pashto/Urdu: مشتاق احمد خان) (born 3 March 1974) is a Pakistani politician and political activist who has been the chairman of the Pakistan Rights Movement since 10 January 2026. He was a member of Jamaat-e-Islami and served as a member of the Senate of Pakistan representing Khyber Pakhtunkhwa, from March 2018 to March 2024.

Khan is known for his pro-Palestine protests and human rights activism. Khan has participated in the 2025 Global Sumud Flotilla to extend aid to Gaza as a representative of Pakistan.

He was arrested by the Israel Defense Forces on October 2, 2025, and released five days later on October 7.

In January 2026, Khan announced the formation of a new political party, the Pakistan Rights Movement (PRM), at a founding ceremony in Islamabad. The party was presented as an Islamic and democratic platform committed to reforming the country in accordance with the 1973 Constitution, which it said upholds Islamic principles and guarantees citizens’ rights.

== Early life and education ==
Khan was born on 3 March 1974 in Sheikh Jana, a village located in the Swabi District of Khyber Pakhtunkhwa, Pakistan. Khan did his matriculation from the Government High School in Swabi and later did his Masters in Physics from the University of Peshawar.

== Political career ==
=== Early years ===
During his higher studies, Khan joined Islami Jamiat-e-Talaba, the student organization of Jamaat-e-Islami. He was elected as provincial head of the Islami Jamiat Talaba in 1997, central general secretary in 1999, and later Central President (Nazim-e-Ala) in 2002 for being an active student leader.

=== Senator ===
Before becoming a senator in 2018, Khan was the Provincial President of Jamaat-e-Islami Khyber Pakhtunkhwa until he resigned from the party's internal post in April 2022.

Khan was elected to the Senate of Pakistan as a candidate of Jamaat-e-Islami Pakistan on a general seat from Khyber Pakhtunkhwa in the 2018 Pakistani Senate election, backed by 7 votes of his party members in the provincial assembly of Khyber Pakhtunkhwa. He took his oath as Senator on 12 March 2018.

In February 2021, when a video about Pakistan Tehreek-e-Insaf members taking bribes for Senate elections was leaked, a sub-committee was formed to investigate the matter. The committee consisted of Shireen Mazari, Fawad Chaudhry and Mirza Shahzad Akbar. Khan was amongst four members who were summoned to explain their position as to how they won Senate elections.

In October 2021 he was elected as President of Jamaat-e-Islami Khyber Pakhtunkhwa chapter for the third time consecutively. After his resignation as Provincial President of the Party in April 2022 due to his increased involvement in the Senate of Pakistan, he was succeeded by Muhammad Ibrahim Khan.

During his tenure as senator, he has been a member of at least 6 sub-committees of the houses including: "Devolution (Chairperson Committee)", "Select Committee on The Islamabad Capital Territory Trust (Amendment) Bill, 2020", "Cabinet Secretariat", "House Business Advisory Committee", "Defence", "Inter-Provincial Coordination", "Federal Education and Professional Training", and "Parliamentary Committee to Protect Minorities from Forced Conversions".

In February 2022 he was declared amongst the top 5 senators that spoke on the floor of the senate.

His term as a senator ended in March 2024, along with that of 51 other lawmakers.

He has participated in Pashtun Tahafuz Movement gatherings, including the Pashtun National Jirga.

=== Founding the PRM ===
In January 2026, he announced the launch of a new political party, the Pakistan Rights Movement (PRM). The party was presented as an Islamic-democratic political platform advocating governance rooted in the 1973 Constitution, which Mushtaq described as combining Islamic principles with fundamental rights. Ideologically, the party positions itself around social and economic justice, opposition to corruption and elite dominance, and the protection of civil liberties, including freedom of expression and press freedom. Mushtaq criticised the existing political system as unrepresentative and argued for greater public participation in decision-making, alongside reforms aimed at addressing poverty, inequality, unemployment, and institutional concentration of power.

== Political actions ==
=== Missing children and persons ===
In December 2018, as part of the Senate's special committee against child abuse, Khan said around 25 million children weren't even attending school but the government kept boasting of good performance. He claimed that children were being smuggled across the border with Iran.

=== Corruption cases ===
In August 2020, Khan as chairperson of The Senate Standing Committee on Science and Technology, took up various issues of importance including irregularities & corruption cases at Pakistan Council of Scientific and Industrial Research (PCSIR) & Pakistan Standards and Quality Control Authority (PSQCA).

=== Efforts on national reconciliation ===
In June 2022, Khan claimed that despite being a member of the Parliamentary Committee on the National Security (PCNS), he was being ignored from being invited to the meetings of the committee and demanded that the details of negotiations with dissenting factions of society be made public.

=== 2024 D-Chowk Dharna ===
In May 2024, a series of protests, referred to as the D-Chowk Dharna, were held in Islamabad, Pakistan. Organized by Khan, the demonstrations were a response to the Gaza War, demanding government and international intervention in the Gaza conflict.

In May 2024, a case was filed against Khan, along with other leaders of Jamaat-e-Islami (JI), for their pro-Palestine demonstrations. The Islamabad Police arrested Khan, on several charges related to demonstrations.

=== 2025 Gaza Flotilla ===
In September 2025, Khan joined the Global Sumud Flotilla along with five others, including AJK Minister for Information, Mazhar Saeed Shah.

==== Arrest and release ====
On 2 October 2025, Khan was arrested by Israel Defense Forces (IDF) from a Gaza-bound aid ship in international waters approximately 70 nautical miles (≈115 km) off the Gaza coast. A total of 45 vessels were seized and 462 activists were detained between 1–3 October 2025, bringing an end to what is considered the largest civilian effort to break the siege of Gaza.

On 7 October 2025, Khan was released from detention under the IDF. His release was confirmed by Pakistan's Foreign Minister, Ishaq Dar, who stated that Khan was at the Pakistani embassy in Jordan.

Following his release, Khan said that that during his detention at the Ktzi'ot Prison in the Negev desert, he and other prisoners were subjected to harsh treatment, including being handcuffed, shackled, blindfolded, and threatened with dogs and firearms. He also reported that a three-day hunger strike they staged to demand better conditions was met with a denial of water, fresh air, and medical care.

== Books ==
In 2025, Khan authored the book Pakistan aur Aalam-e-Islam: Palestine, Kashmir, Afghanistan, Hindustani Musalman, Aafia Siddiqui (پاکستان اور عالم اسلام: فلسطین، کشمیر، افغانستان، ہندستانی مسلمان، عافیہ صدیقی), which discusses Pakistan's relations with the Islamic world, focusing on issues in Palestine, Kashmir, Afghanistan, Indian Muslims, and the case of Aafia Siddiqui.
