= Abdul Malek (Student leader) =

- Born: May 1947; Bogra District, Bengal Province, British India
- Died: August 15, 1969 (aged 22); Dhaka Medical College Hospital, Dhaka, East Pakistan
- Cause of death: Injuries from physical assault
- Citizenship: Pakistani
- Education: Rajshahi College; University of Dhaka
- Occupation: Student activist
- Known for: Islamic education movement in East Pakistan
- Movement: Islamic education movement

Abdul Malek (May 1947 – 15 August 1969) was a prominent student leader in East Pakistan during the late 1960s. He was a student of the University of Dhaka who advocated for an Islamic-based education system in the then-Pakistan. On 12 August 1969, he was severely injured during a violent clash between two student factions at a seminar held at the University of Dhaka. He succumbed to his injuries on 15 August while undergoing treatment at Dhaka Medical College Hospital. In commemoration of his death, Bangladesh Islami Chhatra Shibir observes 15 August every year as "Islamic Education Day" (ইসলামী শিক্ষা দিবস).

== Early life ==
Abdul Malek was born in May 1947 in Khokshabari village (currently Bogha village under Dhunat Upazila, Bangladesh) in the Bogra District of the then Bengal Province, British India. His father was Munshi Mohammad Ali and his mother was Mossammat Sabirun Nesa. He was the youngest among the brothers in a family of six siblings.

== Education ==
Malek completed his primary education up to class two at Khokshabari Primary School and studied up to class eight at Gosajibari High School. He later completed his secondary education at Bogra Zilla School and his higher secondary education at Rajshahi College.

He secured a junior scholarship in 1960. In 1963, he secured the 11th position in the Secondary School Certificate (SSC) examination under the Rajshahi Board. In 1965, he completed his Higher Secondary Certificate (HSC) from Rajshahi Government College, securing the 4th position in the merit list of the Rajshahi Board. In 1966, he enrolled in the Department of Biochemistry at the University of Dhaka and resided in room 112 of Fazlul Huq Muslim Hall.

== Political career ==
Malek was involved in student politics, first as a supporter of the United Front and later the Muslim League.

After getting admitted to the University of Dhaka, he joined the Islami Chhatra Sangha in 1966. He was elected as the General Secretary of the Dhaka City branch in 1967 and became its President in July of the same year. He served as a central executive member of the Pakistan Islami Chhatra Sangha during the 1967–1968 session.

== Clash, assault, and death ==
Following the Partition of India in 1947, East Pakistan faced persistent debates regarding the structure and ideological foundation of its education system. To address the growing unrest, the government formed several education commissions over the years. In 1969, General Yahya Khan's administration formed the Air Marshal Nur Khan Commission to propose comprehensive reforms, which subsequently released a draft education policy.

On 12 August 1969, the Dhaka University Central Students' Union (DUCSU) organized a seminar at the National Institute of Public Administration (NIPA) building (currently the Faculty of Business Studies) to debate the draft education policy. The meeting was chaired by DUCSU Vice President Tofail Ahmed. Tension escalated when student leaders representing Islamic factions protested during the opening speech by Shamsuddoha, leading to a violent outbreak between competing student groups.

The half-hour-long clash resulted in injuries to at least 50 students from both sides. Retaliatory chases ensued across the campus, spilling over to the Racecourse Maidan (now Suhrawardy Udyan). Abdul Malek was brutally beaten during the confrontation and sustained severe head injuries. He was rushed to the hospital, where he died while undergoing treatment at Dhaka Medical College Hospital on 15 August 1969.

Abu Bakr Rafique, who was a student of Dhaka University at the time, although not present at the meeting, wrote in 2025 that the attack on Abdul Malek was directly led by student leaders of the era, including Tofail Ahmed.

== Protests and reactions ==
The killing of Malek drew widespread condemnation from political and student organizations across East Pakistan. DUCSU issued an official statement expressing deep condolences over his demise, signed by student leaders including Tofail Ahmed, Shamsuddoha, Nurul Islam, A. S. M. Abdur Rab, Mostafa Kamal Haidar, and Mahbubullah. Sheikh Mujibur Rahman also condemned the murder. Regional newspapers, including The Daily Azadi, provided extensive coverage of the incident and its political fallout for over a week.

== Legacy ==
A social welfare organization named Shahid Abdul Malek Welfare Foundation was established in his hometown upazila. In August 2025, an inter-hall debate competition was organized in memory of Malek at the Islamic University, Bangladesh in Kushtia.

== See also ==
- Air Marshal Nur Khan Education Commission, 1969
- Education in Pakistan
