= Khurshid Ahmad (scholar) =

Pakistani economist, philosopher and politician (1932–2025)

- خورشید احمد
- Born: 23 March 1932; Delhi, British India
- Died: 13 April 2025 (aged 93); Leicester, England

Academic background
- Education: Government College University; University of Leicester; International Islamic University
- Influences: Capitalism; Perspectives on capitalism Conservatism

Academic work
- Discipline: Economics (Islamics)
- School or tradition: Islamic economic jurisprudence
- Institutions: Karachi University; University of Leicester; Institute of Policy Studies; Planning Commission
- Notable ideas: Islamic economics and conservatism
- Awards: King Faisal International Prize; Nishan-i-Imtiaz (Order of Excellence) (2011)

Khurshid Ahmad (Urdu: خورشید احمد; 23 March 1932 – 13 April 2025) was a Pakistani economist, philosopher, politician and an Islamic activist who helped to develop Islamic economic jurisprudence as an academic discipline and one of the co-founders (along with Khurram Murad) of The Islamic Foundation in Leicester, UK.

A senior conservative figure, he was a long-standing party worker of the Islamist Jamaat-e-Islami (JeI) party, and successfully ran for the Senate of Pakistan following the 2002 general elections on a platform of Muttahida Majlis-e-Amal (MMA). He served in the Senate until 2012. He had previously acted as a policy adviser in the Zia regime when he chaired the Planning Commission, focusing on the role of Islamising the country's national economy in the 1980s.

== Early life and education ==
Ahmad was born into an Urdu-speaking family in Delhi, British India, on 23 March 1932. He entered in the Anglo-Arabic College in Delhi. After the partition of India in 1947, the family moved to Pakistan and were settled in Lahore, Punjab, after which, he enrolled at the Government College University to study business and economics in 1949. In 1949, at the age of 17, Ahmad published his first English article in the Muslim Economist.

He secured his graduation in BA in first-class honours in Economics (1952). He began reading the philosophical work of Abul A'la Maududi and was a worker of his party, the Jamaat-e-Islami (JeI). In 1952, he took the bar exam and entered the law programme of the GCU with strong emphasis on Islamic law and jurisprudence. At his university, he remained a student worker for the JeI while offering tutoring in Islamic studies. As an aftermath of violent riots in Lahore, Ahmad left the GCU to avoid the mass arrest and detainment of the JeI workers by the Punjab Police Department, and moved to Karachi permanently.

Khurshid Ahmad enrolled in the University of Karachi and graduated with an MSc with Hons in Economics after defending his thesis that contained the fundamental work of Adam Smith on the invisible hand and capitalism in 1958.

In 1962, Khurshid Ahmad graduated with an MA with honours in Islamic studies from the University of Karachi and won a scholarship to pursue a doctoral degree in the United Kingdom in 1965. Ahmad enrolled at the University of Leicester and joined the Faculty of Economics for his doctoral studies. He successfully defended his doctoral thesis for his PhD in Economics in 1967–68. His doctoral thesis was on Islamic economic jurisprudence. In 1970, his services to promote literacy was recognized by Leicester University, which honoured him with an honorary doctorate in Education. In 1970, he moved to England and joined the department of philosophy to teach Contemporary philosophy at the Leicester University.

== Death ==
Ahmad died in Leicester, England on 13 April 2025, at the age of 93. His funeral was performed the following day, on 14 April, at the Saffron Hill Cemetery in Leicester.

== Books ==
Ahmad had authored and edited over 70 books in both English and Urdu, including:

=== Author ===
- Islam and the West, Islamic Publications Limited, 1957, 46 p.
- Essays on Pakistan Economy, Maktaba-e-Faridi, 1958, 252 p.
- Tahrik-i Islami / تحریکِ اسلامی [Islamic Movement], n.m., 1963, 440 p.
- Principles of Islamic Education, Islamic Publications, 1968, 28 p.
- Socialism ya Islam / سوشلسم یا اسلام [Socialism or Islam], Maktab-i Chiragh-i Rah, 1969, 331 p.
- Family Life in Islam, Islamic Foundation, 1974, 32 p.
- Mawlana Mawdudi: An Introduction to His Life and Thought, Islamic Foundation, 1979, 44 p. Co-written with Zafar Ishaq Ansari.

=== Translator ===
- Syed Abul ʻAla Mawdudi, Toward Understanding Islam, Islamic Publications, 1960, 191 p.
- Syed Abul ʻAla Mawdudi, First Principles of the Islamic State, Islamic Publications, 1968, 72 p.

=== Editor ===
- Islam: Its Meaning and Message, Islamic Council of Europe, 1976, 279 p.
- Islamic Perspectives: Studies in Honour of Mawlana Sayyid Abul Ala Maududi, Islamic Foundation, 1979, 394 p. Co-edited alongside Zafar Ishaq Ansari.
- Elimination of Riba from the Economy, Institute of Policy Studies, 1994, 425 p.

== Awards and recognition ==
- In recognition of his scholarly contributions, Khurshid Ahmad was awarded Pakistan's highest civil award, the Nishan-e-Imtiaz on 23 March 2011.
- He received the King Faisal Award for Service to Islam in 1990 (Co-laureate: Ali Al Tantawi)

== See also ==
- Naeem Siddiqui
- Islami Jamiat-e-Talaba
- Jamaat-e-Islami Pakistan
- Muttahida Majlis-e-Amal
- Sayyid Abul Ala Maududi
- Mian Tufail Mohammad
- Abdul Ghafoor Ahmed
- Politics of Pakistan
