= Pakistan Rights Movement =

Political party in Pakistan

Pakistan Rights Movement پاکستان رائٹس موومنٹ
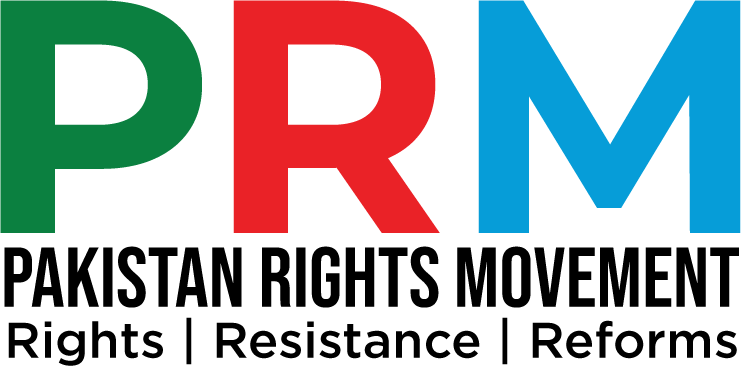
- Abbreviation: PRM
- Leader: Mushtaq Ahmad Khan
- Founders: Mushtaq Ahmad Khan
- Founded: 10 January 2026; 6 months ago
- Split from: JIP
- Headquarters: Islamabad, Pakistan
- Student wing: PRM Student Forum
- Youth wing: PRM Youth Wing
- Women's wing: PRM Women Wing
- Volunteer Wing: PRM Volunteer Wing
- Lawyers Wing: PRM Lawyers Forum
- Teachers Wing: PRM Lawyers Wing
- Doctors Wing: PRM Doctors Wing
- Ideology: Islamic democracy Decentralisation; Civic Nationalism
- Political position: Big Tent
- National affiliation: TTAP
- Colors: Green, Red, Blue
- Slogan: Rights, Resistance, Reforms

Party flag

Website
- https://www.prm.org.pk/

The Pakistan Rights Movement (PRM; Urdu: پاکستان رائٹس موومنٹ) is a political party in Pakistan founded on 10 January 2026 by Mushtaq Ahmad Khan, a former member of the Senate of Pakistan.

== Background ==
In September 2025, Mushtaq Ahmad Khan joined the Global Sumud Flotilla (GSF), an initiative that sought to deliver humanitarian supplies to the Gaza Strip. On 2 October 2025, he was detained by the Israel Defense Forces (IDF) while aboard an aid vessel approximately 70 nautical miles off the coast of Gaza. He was released on 7 October 2025 and returned to Pakistan on 9 October 2025. On 10 October 2025, Khan announced that he had resigned from Jamaat-e-Islami Pakistan (JI) on 19 September 2025 while travelling with the GSF. He stated that his resignation was not due to personal differences but was intended to create an independent political platform focused on the advocacy of human rights, democratic governance, and constitutionalism. On 10 January 2026, Khan formally launched the Pakistan Rights Movement during a ceremony in Islamabad held at the Hill View Hotel. The event was attended by party representatives, supporters, and members of civil society. At the launch, he described the PRM as an Islamic and democratic political platform committed to reform in accordance with the 1973 Constitution. Khan outlined the party's objectives as including the promotion of social and economic justice, access to timely and affordable justice, protection of freedom of expression, expanded access to education and healthcare, and the reduction of poverty and corruption. During the event, Khan also criticised the existing parliamentary system, describing it as lacking legitimacy. He stated that the armed forces should refrain from involvement in political affairs. Regarding military operations, he stated that the public, legislative assemblies, and regional jirgas should be consulted prior to any deployment.
