= Asadullah Bhutto =

Pakistani politician

- Born: Sindh, Pakistan
- Education: University of Sindh
- Occupations: Politician, president of Jamaat-e-Islami

Asadullah Bhutto (Sindhi: اسد الله ڀٽو) is an Ameer of Jamaat-e-Islami Sindh. He belongs to the Bhutto tribe of Sindh

== Political career ==
Bhutto is a lawyer by profession. He completed his LL.B in 1969 and Masters in Sociology in 1974 from University of Sindh. Bhutto has been a member of Pakistan Bar Association for 33 years and Human Rights Network of Pakistan for four years. He has traveled to Iran and Afghanistan.
