= Siraj-ul-Haq =

Pakistani politician

Siraj ul Haq
- سراج الحق
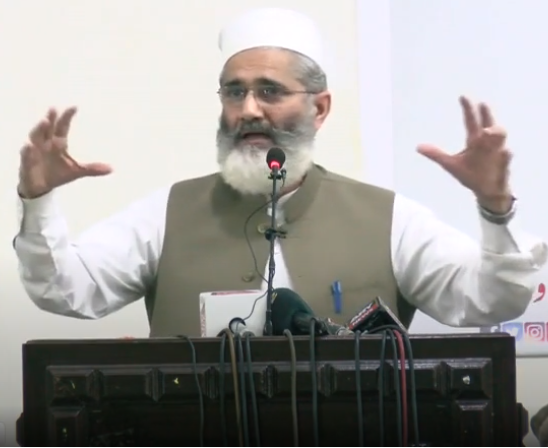

5th Emir of Jamaat-e-Islami (Pakistan)
- In office 30 March 2014 – 4 April 2024
- Preceded by: Munawar Hasan
- Succeeded by: Hafiz Naeem ur Rehman

Senate of Pakistan
- In office 12 March 2015 – 11 March 2021
- Constituency: Khyber Pakhtunkhwa

Senior Minister and Provincial Minister of Finance Khyber Pakhtunkhwa
- In office 2 June 2013 – 11 March 2015
- In office 30 November 2002 – 11 October 2007

Provincial Assembly of Khyber Pakhtunkhwa
- In office 31 May 2013 – 11 March 2015
- Constituency: PK-95 Lower Dir
- In office November 2002 – 11 October 2007
- Constituency: PF-95 Lower Dir

Personal details
- Born: 5 September 1962 (age 64) Lower Dir District, Khyber Pakhtunkhwa, Pakistan
- Education: University of Peshawar; University of the Punjab
- Occupation: Politician

Siraj-ul-Haq (Pashto: سراج الحق; born 5 September 1962) is a Pakistani politician who was elected as the chief of Jamaat-e-Islami, a religious political party in Pakistan which seeks to establish an Islamic legal system. He also served as the Finance minister of Khyber Pakhtunkhwa twice; first in the cabinet of Chief Minister Akram Khan Durrani, from 2002–2007, and again minister during Pervez Khattak's tenure as Chief Minister.

== Early life and education ==
Siraj-ul-Haq was born in Meerzo village of Shabqadar Tehsil in Charsadda District. However, he paternally belongs to Samarbagh in Lower Dir District. His father was a graduate of Darul Uloom Deoband and the superintendent (مہتمم) of a Madrassa. He received his early education in local regional schools and studied political science in the University of Peshawar and MA (Education) from University of Punjab in 1990. At university, he studied the books of Maulana Syed Abul Aala Maududi and Maulana Naeem Siddiqui.

== Political career ==
He joined Islami Jamiat-e-Talaba and was the chief of Islami Jamiat-e-Talaba from 1988 to 1991 and has been elected twice as MPA from PK-95 constituency.

He was elected to Khyber Pakhtunkhwa Assembly in the 2002 election from the platform of Muttahida Majlis-e-Amal and was made finance minister in the provincial cabinet under the leadership of Akram Khan Durrani. However, he allegedly resigned in protest against the deadly US drone strike on a madrassa in Bajaur Agency which resulted in the deaths of 86 children. Though the then Ameer Jamat e Islami, Qazi Hussain Ahmad, claimed that it was the party decision to vacate one of the two offices i.e. Ministry and Ameer Jamat e Islami Khyber Pakhtunkhwa, then N.W.F.P. His party boycotted the 2008 election. In 2013, he contested on Jamaat-e-Islami's ticket and was elected to the assembly.

He remained the Deputy Ameer of Jamaat-e-Islami until 30 March 2014 when he was elected as the Ameer of Jamaat-e-Islami Pakistan. In accordance with party rules whereby intra-party elections are held every five years, he was re-elected as Ameer (chief) of Jamaat-e-Islami in March 2019, until March 2024. He remains immensely popular in his constituency and is known for his modesty among friends and foes alike.

He resigned from the Ministry of Finance in June 2014 right after the budget because, according to party rules, one person cannot hold two offices at the same time. At that time, he was Ameer of Jamaat-e-Islami and Senior Minister in KPK Assembly.

He gained immense popularity when Imran Khan and Muhammad Tahir-ul-Qadri announced the Long March against Prime Minister Muhammad Mian Nawaz Sharif. He acted as a neutral figure. He convinced the government and Imran Khan to negotiate and due to his efforts the government became stable. He said that the Jamaat-e-Islami would not let democracy be derailed and, political differences aside, democracy would be saved. For his efforts, he received an award from the government of Pakistan on 14 August 2014 from President Mamnoon Hussain.

In 2015, he fought and won the election for senate. He is considered to be a senior member of the Parliament of Pakistan.

During the 2018 general elections, he lost the national assembly seat NA-7 Lower Dir II to his rival candidate, Muhammad Bashir Khan of PTI, by a margin of 16,144 votes and was the runner up.

== Writings ==
Siraj-ul-Haq has authored opinion pieces, notably in Narratives Magazine, where he addressed issues such as the Kashmir conflict and the critique of dynastic politics in Pakistan.
