= Daily Jasarat =

Pakistani newspaper

- Type: Daily Newspaper
- Publisher: Syed Zahid Ali Askari
- Editor-in-chief: Shah Nawaz Farooqi (ur)
- Editor: Syed Muzaffer Ejaz
- Founded: March 1970
- Political alignment: Jamaat-e-Islami
- Language: Urdu
- Headquarters: Karachi, Pakistan
- Circulation: 1%
- Sister newspapers: Weekly Friday Special
- Website: www.jasarat.com

Daily Jasarat (Urdu: روزنامہ جسارت) is an Urdu Daily newspaper in Pakistan. It is circulated all over Pakistan with offices in Karachi, Lahore and Islamabad.

== History ==
Daily Jasarat was originally started in March 1970 from Multan, but soon moved its operations to Karachi and later shut down due to strikes by journalists.

Daily Jasarat faced governmental censorship, particularly between 1972 and 1976 under Zulfikar Ali Bhutto's administration, resulting in multiple temporary shutdowns. Internal conflicts arose during Muhammad Zia-ul-Haq's rule between the newspaper's editorial leadership and Jamaat-e-Islami, especially over the issue of supporting the military regime. These disputes led to significant shifts within the organization, including the departure of editor Maulana Salahuddin.

Subsequent to these internal changes, Daily Jasarat has seen a decline in readership, a trend that has continued over several decades, exacerbated by the rise of competing publications such as Daily Ummat in the 1990s.

== Political stance ==
The newspaper reflects views of Jamaat-e-Islami Pakistan, a religious political party in Pakistan, while generally opposing left-wing and liberal ideologies.

== Magazines ==
Jasarat has two magazines:

- Sunday Magazine
- Weekly Friday Special Site
