= JI Youth =

- Abbreviation: JIY
- Founded: 1994
- Preceded by: Shabab e Milli
- Headquarters: Mansoorah, Lahore
- National affiliation: Jamaat-e-islami

Website
- www.jiyouth.org

Jamaat-e-Islami Youth Pakistan (Urdu: جماعت اسلامی یوتھ;) formerly Shabab-e-Milli is a youth wing of the Jamaat-e-Islami political party of Pakistan. It was formed In 1994 by Jamaat-e-Islami to disown its previous youth group Pasban. It was expected to replace the much active Pasban, but it remained as a passive youth wing of Jamaat-e-Islami. Its headquarters are located at Mansoorah, Lahore.

The main issues raised by JI Youth are day to day problems of the common man, Islamic and Pakistani values, and corruption. It raise voice on human rights violations in society off and on, but its main function seems to organize Jamaat-e-Islami’s, big programs and to give boost to campaigns.

== Personalities ==
- Naeem Siddiqui - First mentor and Nazim e Tarbiat

== See also ==
- Formation of Millat Party and coalition with PML-Q
- Jamaat-e-Islami Pakistan
