= Institute of Policy Studies (Pakistan) =

Pakistani think tank

- Abbreviation: IPS
- Formation: 1979
- Founder: Khurshid Ahmad
- Headquarters: Commercial Center Plot 1, MPCHS E-11/3 Islamabad, 44000, Pakistan
- Official language: English; Urdu
- Website: http://www.ips.org.pk/

The Institute of Policy Studies (Urdu: ادارہ امور دانش و کار ہائے حکمت) is a Pakistani think tank founded by economist, political thinker and former senator Khurshid Ahmad in 1979, who continues as its chairman. IPS declares itself to be an autonomous, not-for-profit, civil society organization, dedicated to promoting policy-oriented research. It claims to provide a forum for informed discussion and dialogue on national and international issues.

Research matters are overseen by the IPS National Academic Council composed of diplomats, academics, educationists, military and industry experts.

== Activities ==
The IPS achieves its objectives through a wide range of activities and outcomes ranging from seminars, symposia, conferences and roundtables on multi-dimensional topics. Reports, periodicals and publications, interaction, dialogue, thematic research, and capacity-building programs are instrumental in its research endeavors. IPS formulate viable plans and present key initiatives and policy measures to policymakers, analysts, political leaders, legislators, researchers, academia, civil society organization, media and other stakeholders. IPS believes in good governance, transparency (behavior), professionalism, and program effectiveness. The institute strictly upholds its independence, credibility, and Integrity. It operates as a self-financed think-tank through endowments, sponsorships, voluntary services and private donations. Aside from its periodicals, publications and membership fees it also generates revenues by providing consultancy services.

IPS has defined Pakistan Affairs, International Relations and Religion and Faith as its major areas of research and has developed an effective system for coordination of research activities by local and foreign scholars through a dedicated team of research coordinators. Through this scheme of work, IPS is not only able to conduct in-house research on areas of interest but also coordinates research activities by IPS associates working at their respective places. Its academic programs are designed and run under the supervision of National Academic Council (NAC), which plays a pivotal role in functioning of IPS by providing policy guidelines, reviewing its plans and setting its priorities. IPS garners collaboration as well as extends its active cooperation to other organizations in one or more areas of research. Such coordination could be time- specific or discipline-based for conducting joint research, cosponsoring of seminars and exchange of library and other facilities. IPS currently reciprocates with a number of national and international institutions and is engaged in scholars’ exchange arrangements with various research institutions within Pakistan and abroad.

== Funding ==
Endowments, Sponsorships and Memberships, Professional Training Programmes, Seminars & Publications, Collaboration and Contract Research

== Publications ==
- Bowen, Innes (2014), Medina in Birmingham, Najaf in Brent: Inside British Islam, Hurst, ISBN 978-1-84904-529-2
