= National Labour Federation (Pakistan) =

National trade union centre in Pakistan

NLF
- National Labour Federation
- Founded: 9 November 1969
- Headquarters: 2-A Sanda Road, Lahore +923324467526
- Location: Pakistan
- Members: 42,210
- Key people: Mr.Shamus ur Rahman Swati, President; Mr. M Haseeb ur Rehman, Secretary General; Mr. Masood Fazal, Head, Research & Development
- Affiliations: Jamaat-e-Islami Pakistan

The National Labour Federation (NLF) is national trade union centre in Pakistan. The trade union is organises workers in various sectors, including telecommunications, shipyards, transport and manufacturing. It is the most representative and largest trade union worker federation in Pakistan.

== History ==
The trade union was formed on 9 November 1969, by Jamaat-e-Islami's Abul A'la Maududi to promote Islamism among workers in Pakistan. Prof. Shafi Malik became NLF's first president and secretary-general and remained on these positions until 2000.

In 2003, NLF was registered at the National Industrial Relations Commission.

In November 2015, NLF for the first time came together with left-leaning trade unions to condemn plans of the PML-N government to privatise state-owned enterprises.

== See also ==
- Trade unions in Pakistan
