= Islami Jamiat-e-Talaba =

Student Organization in Pakistan

Islami Jamiat-e-Talaba اسلامی جمعیتِ طلبہ پاکستان
- President: Sahibzada Wasim Haider
- Secretary-General: Abuzar Ghaffari
- Assist. Sec. General: Dr. Naveed Nadir Magsi; Muhammad Hassan Amin; Umais Aziz
- Founded: 23 December 1947, Lahore
- Succeeded by: Islami Chhatra Shibir (de jure in Bangladesh)
- Headquarters: Ichhra, Lahore
- Ideology: Islamism; Islamic revivalism Islamic socialism Islamic teachings Social justice Patriotism; Political Islam; Revolutionary; Pan-Islamism
- National affiliation: Jamaat-e-Islami Pakistan
- International affiliation: BICS; AFMY; IIFSO; WAMY; SIO
- Slogan: To seek the pleasure of Allah SWT through human capital development by subscribing to the rule established by Allah SWT and his last messenger Muhammad (PBUH).
- Publication: Ham Qadam (Urdu & English Magazine)
- Publishing house: Idara Matbuat-e-Talaba

Party flag
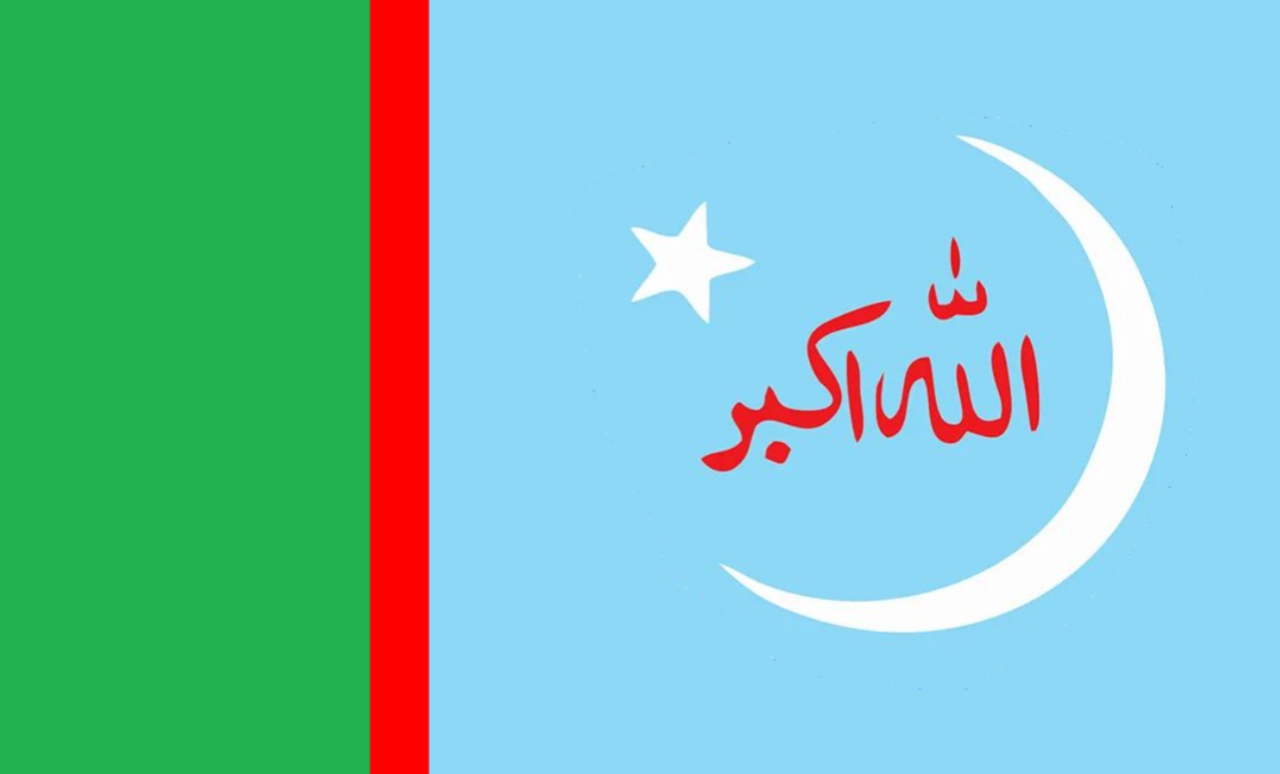

Website
- www.jamiat.org.pk

Islami Jamiat-e-Talaba (Urdu: اسلامی جمعیتِ طلبہ) abbr. IJT is the largest student organization in Pakistan. It was founded by 25 students on 23 December 1947 at Lahore, Pakistan. Islami Jamiat-e-Talaba is working in Pakistan to eliminate the non-Islamic elements and secularism from the curriculum and teachings of the educational institutions of Pakistan. It is a member of the International Islamic Federation of Student Organizations and the World Assembly of Muslim Youth.

IJT was influenced mainly by the works of the late Syed Abul-Ala Maududi and Maulana Naeem Siddiqui. It is an Islamic organization whose stated mission is to preach Islam to students of modern institutions throughout Pakistan. From the 1970s until about the early 1990s it was also the main ideological engine powering the concept of political Islam on the country's university and college campuses. It attempts to promote its vision of Islamic values and glorify the image of Islam through various means. Its main fields are the modern educational institutions, i.e. colleges and universities across Pakistan, though many local sub-divisions are active at the school level, like Bazm-e-Sathi (Sindh), Bazm-e-Paigham (Punjab), Bazm-e-Roshni (AJK & GB), Bazm-e-Sathi (Balochistan), Bazm-e-Shaheen (KPK) under the Islamic Society of Children Hobbies.

== History ==
Islami Jamiat-e-Talaba was founded on 23 December 1947 in Lahore by a group of 25 students led by Maaz Ghani with the vision of creating an Islamic society based on the teachings of the Quran and Sunnah. It is one of the oldest student organizations in Pakistan. The headquarters of IJT is in the city of Lahore. The women's wing of the organization, with the same ideology but with a separate structure and leadership, is known as Islami Jamiat-e-Talibaat. Its main fields are the modern educational institutions, i.e. colleges and universities across Pakistan, though its local sub-division Bazm-e-Gul is active at school level all over Pakistan.

It has a counterpart of the same ideology but with a complete, separate and independent structure and organisation, known as Jamiat Talaba Arabia Pakistan. JT Arabia works in religious institutions of Pakistan.)

Islami Jamiat-e-Talaba is continuously struggling by keeping their voice up for the revival of students unions after the ban.

=== Motto ===
Islami Jamiat Talaba's purpose or motto is "to seek the pleasure of Allah through human capital development by subscribing to the rule established by Allah and his last messenger Muhammad (SAW)."

1. Dawah (Call to Allah) - Conveying the message of Islam to the students and inspiring them to acquire knowledge and to arouse in them the sense of responsibility to practice Islam in full.
2. Organization - To organize the students who are ready to partake in the struggle for establishing the Islamic way of life within the fold of this organization.
3. Training - To take appropriate steps to impart Islamic knowledge among the students integrated under the organization to make them men of character, capable of braving the challenges of Jahilyah and, thus, to prove the superiority of Islam.
4. Islamic Education Movement and Student-oriented Problems - To struggle for changing the existing system of education on the basis of Islamic values to build up ideal citizens and enhance leadership to solve real problems of the students.
5. Establishing Islamic Social Order - To strive tooth-and-nail to establish Islamic social order for freeing humanity from all forms of economic exploitation, political oppression and cultural servitude.

== List of chief administrators ==
| No. | Year(s) | Name | Brief biography |
|---|---|---|---|
| 1 | December 1947– October 1950 | Zafarullah Khan | Born on 1 October 1925 in Bijnor. His father, Maulana Nasrullah Khan, was a prominent religious scholar and editor. He served as the first Nazim-e-Ala of Islami Jamiat-e-Talaba Pakistan from its founding in December 1947 until October 1950. |
| 2 | November 1950 – September 1951 | Dr. Muhammad Naseem | The second Nazim-e-Ala of Islami Jamiat-e-Talaba Pakistan. He was a student at King Edward Medical College, Lahore, during his tenure. |
| 3 | October 1951 – October 1952 | Khurram Murad | Born in 1932 in Rai Sein, Bhopal. He matriculated from Bhopal in 1947 and reached Karachi in November 1948 when Islami Jamiat-e-Talaba was already established. He later became one of the foremost Islamic scholars of the twentieth century. |
| 4 | November 1952 – July 1953 | Israr Ahmad | Born on 26 April 1932 in Hisar, Eastern Punjab. He received his early education there and migrated to Pakistan during Partition. He later became a renowned Islamic scholar and founder of Tanzeem-e-Islami. |
| 5 | August 1953 – October 1953 | Dr. Murad Ali Shah | His residential connection is with district Swabi. He completed intermediate science studies at Islamia College Peshawar and would further his education at Lahore in 1949. |
| 6 | November 1953 – September 1955 | Khurshid Ahmad | Born in March 1932 in Delhi. He received his initial education at Anglo-Arabic Secondary School, Ajmeri Gate, Delhi. After matriculation, he migrated to Pakistan and went on to become a renowned statesman, thinker, economist, and author. |
| 7 | October 1955 – December 1956 | Hussain Khan | Born in February 1933 in Hyderabad Deccan. He passed matriculation from Aligarh and intermediate studies at Hyderabad, came to Pakistan in 1950 and completed a BA at Urdu Science College, Karachi. |
| 8 | December 1957 – October 1958 | Absar Alam | Born on 2 July 1926 in Mundara village, Allahabad (UP). He passed matriculation in 1947 under the Allahabad board, intermediate in 1949, and later migrated to Pakistan. |
| 9 | November 1958 – November 1962 | Mohammad Hussain Khan | |
| 10 | December 1962 – November 1964 | Sheikh Mehboob Ali | Born on 19 June 1937 in Ujjain; migrated to Pakistan in 1949. He matriculated in Karachi, passed intermediate in 1956, and enrolled in a BA in Philosophy. |
| 11 | December 1964 – October 1967 | Syed Munawar Hassan | Born in 1942 in Delhi. His family moved to Karachi after Partition. He completed a BSc and MAs in Sociology and Islamic Studies at Karachi University. He later served as Ameer of Jamaat-e-Islami Pakistan (2008–2014). |
| 12 | November 1967 – November 1969 | Dr. Mohammad Kamal | Born in 1941 in village Marghaz, tehsil Swabi. He received his education in Rawalpindi and Peshawar and obtained his MBBS in 1969. He was associated with Jamiat from his school years and served as Nazim-e-Ala from 1967 to 1969. |
| 13 | November 1969 – September 1971 | Motiur Rahman Nizami | |
| 14 | October 1971 – August 1972 | Tasneem Alam Manzar | Served as Nazim-e-Ala from 1971 to 1972. He was martyred on 16 September 1972 while in office. |
| 15 | September 1972 – September 1975 | Zafar Jamal Baloch | Born in 1949 in village Chak 175, Jhang. He studied in Jhang and later at Karachi University, obtaining an MA in Islamic Studies and an LLB. He joined Jamiat in 1965. |
| 16 | October 1975 – September 1977 | Abdul Malik Mujahid | Born on 2 October 1951 in Nawabshah. Educated in Sindh, he obtained a BA Honours and MA in Political Science from Karachi University. He was elected Nazim-e-Ala in 1975. |
| 17 | October 1977 – August 1979 | Liaqat Baloch | Born in 1952 in Muzaffargarh, Punjab. He studied in Multan and at Punjab University and held several student leadership roles before becoming Nazim-e-Ala in 1977. He currently serves as Naib Ameer of Jamaat-e-Islami Pakistan. |
| 18 | September 1979 – September 1982 | Shabbir Ahmad Khan | Born on 1 May 1951 in Swabi. He became a member in 1970 and held various city and provincial responsibilities before becoming Nazim-e-Ala in 1979. |
| 19 | October 1982 – June 1984 | Mairajuddin Khan | Born on 15 February 1958 in Khairabad, Nowshera. Educated in Peshawar and Karachi. He became Nazim-e-Ala in 1982 and was imprisoned during the martial law ban on student unions. |
| 20 | July 1984 – August 1984 | Ejaz Ahmad Chaudhry | Born on 15 September 1956 in Lahore. An engineer by profession, he served as Nazim-e-Ala for 28 days in 1984 and later served as Deputy Mayor of Lahore. |
| 21 | September 1984 – August 1986 | Syed Rashid Naseem | Born in December 1956 in Karachi. He holds an MA in Political Science from Karachi University. He later served as Deputy Ameer of Jamaat-e-Islami Pakistan. |
| 22 | October 1986 – September 1988 | Ameer-ul-Azeem | Born on 3 October 1958 in Lahore. He holds an MBA and an MA in Political Science. He served as Nazim-e-Ala from 1986 to 1988 and is currently Ameer of Jamaat-e-Islami Central Punjab. |
| 23 | October 1988 – September 1991 | Sirajul Haq | Born on 19 August 1962 in Chitral. He received his early and higher education in Dir district. He served as Nazim-e-Ala from 1988 to 1991 and later became the Central Ameer of Jamaat-e-Islami Pakistan (2014–2024). |
| 24 | October 1991 – September 1993 | Izharul Haq | Born on 4 June 1966 in Karachi. A civil technologist by training, he held city and regional leadership roles before becoming Nazim-e-Ala from 1991 to 1993. |
| 25 | October 1993 – January 1995 | Mohammad Owais Qasim | Born on 6 April 1968 in Lilliani, Sargodha. He studied in Sargodha and at Punjab University, specialising in mass communication. |
| 26 | February 1995 – January 1998 | Syed Waqas Anjum Jafri | Born in 1969 in Lahore. He received education in Mianwali and holds an MA in English from Multan. He later served as Deputy Secretary General of Jamaat-e-Islami Pakistan. |
| 27 | February 1998 – February 2000 | Hafiz Naeem-ur-Rahman | Born on 1 December 1972 in Hyderabad. He holds a BS in Civil Technology from Karachi University. He served as Nazim-e-Ala from 1998 to 2000 and is currently the Ameer of Jamaat-e-Islami Karachi. |
| 28 | February 2000 – February 2002 | Mushtaq Ahmad Khan | Born on 3 March 1974 in Swabi. He holds degrees in Physics. He served at provincial and central levels before becoming Nazim-e-Ala from 2000 to 2002 and is currently Ameer of Jamaat-e-Islami Khyber Pakhtunkhwa. |
| 29 | February 2002 – February 2004 | Mohammad Naveed Anwar | Born on 11 January 1971 in Karachi. A chemical engineer by profession, he held leadership positions in the Karachi zone before serving as Nazim-e-Ala from 2002 to 2004. |
| 30 | February 2004 – February 2006 | Zubair Ahmad Gondal | Born on 2 January 1975 in Sargodha. He holds a Master's degree from Punjab University and held Punjab provincial leadership roles. He later became Central President of Jamaat-e-Islami Punjab. |
| 31 | February 2006 – February 2008 | Nasrullah Goraya | Born on 3 March 1975 in Sialkot. He holds degrees in Journalism and Urdu. He served as Nazim-e-Ala from 2006 to 2008 and later as Secretary General of Jamaat-e-Islami Central Punjab. |
| 32 | February 2008 – February 2010 | Ateeq-ur-Rahman | Born on 4 January 1979 in Peshawar. He holds an MA and an LLB and served in various leadership roles in Khyber Pakhtunkhwa before becoming Nazim-e-Ala from 2008 to 2010. |
| 33 | February 2010 – February 2012 | Syed Abdul Rasheed | Born on 1 January 1980 in Karachi. He holds an MA in International Relations. He led the Karachi zone before becoming Nazim-e-Ala from 2010 to 2012 and later served as a Member of the Provincial Assembly of Sindh. |
| 34 | February 2012 – February 2014 | Mohammad Zubair Safdar | Born on 31 January 1984 in Islamabad. He holds a BS in Computer Science, an MBA, and an M.Phil. He led the Islamabad zone before serving as Nazim-e-Ala from 2012 to 2014. |
| 35 | February 2014 – February 2016 | Zubair Hafeez | Born on 26 October 1983 in Sukkur. He holds a BS in Telecommunication and an LLB, and led the Sindh zone before serving as Nazim-e-Ala from 2014 to 2016. |
| 36 | February 2016 – February 2018 | Syed Sohaibuddin Kakakhel | Born on 22 December 1985 in Peshawar. He holds an MSc in Sociology and held multiple leadership roles across the organisation before serving as Nazim-e-Ala from 2016 to 2018. |
| 37 | February 2018 – February 2020 | Muhammad Amir Nagra | Born on 11 November 1987 near Jhelti Ke Sambrayal. He holds a Master's degree in Economics. He served as Nazim-e-Ala from 2018 to 2020 and later worked as Deputy Secretary of Jamaat-e-Islami Islamabad. |
| 38 | February 2020 – February 2022 | Hamza Muhammad Siddiqui | Born on 7 October 1991 in Karachi. A journalism graduate, he served as Nazim-e-Ala from 2020 to 2022. |
| 39 | February 2022 – February 2024 | Shakeel Ahmad | Served as Nazim-e-Ala of Jamiat from 2022 to 2024. |
| 40 | February 2024 – February 2026 | Hassan Bilal Hashmi | A PhD scholar at Bahauddin Zakariya University, Multan, he was elected Central President of Islami Jamiat-e-Talaba Pakistan in February 2024 and served until February 2026. |
| 41 | February 2026 – Present | Sahibzada Wasim Haider | Born on 2 February 1995 in Bajaur, Khyber Pakhtunkhwa. He completed a BS (International Relations) at the University of Peshawar and a MPhil (International Relations) at the National Defence University (NDU), Islamabad. He is currently pursuing a PhD in International Relations, with research focused on Pakistan – Afghanistan security challenges and peace prospects. He joined Islami Jamiat Talaba in 2011 and has served in various key positions, including President of IJT Peshawar City, Secretary and President of IJT Khyber Pakhtunkhwa, and Secretary General of IJT Pakistan. On 7 February 2026, he was elected as President of Islami Jamiat Talaba Pakistan for the session 2026–27. As a Founding Member of the FATA Youth Jirga, he contributed to advocacy efforts that supported the constitutional integration of Ex-FATA through the 25th Constitutional Amendment. |

== Controversies ==
Members of IJT have been accused of carrying out racially/ethnically motivated assaults and violence, as well as of having links with militant groups. The IJT, however, has denied any such links.

== Notable alumni ==
- Abdul Qadeer Khan
- Ansar Abbasi
- Qazi Hussain Ahmed
- Sohail Ahmed
- Wajihuddin Ahmed
- Arif Alvi
- Amir Cheema
- Fayyaz ul Hassan Chohan
- Hussain Haqqani
- Javed Hashmi
- Ahsan Iqbal
- Orya Maqbool Jan
- Qamar Zaman Kaira
- Abdul Qadeer Khan
- Karnal Sher Khan
- Mushahid Ullah Khan
- Shahid Masood
- Asad Qaiser
- Khawaja Saad Rafique
- Saleem Safi
- Raheel Sharif
- Shaukat Aziz Siddiqui
- Qamar Javed Bajwa
- Ali Muhammad Khan
- Motiur Rahman Nizami
- Mir Quasem Ali
- Ali Ahsan Mohammad Mojaheed
- Muhammad Kamaruzzaman
- Abdul Quader Mollah
- Chowdhury Mueen-Uddin
- Ashrafuz Zaman Khan
- Abdul Malik (Shaheed)
- Dr. M. Umer Chapra

== See also ==
- Jamaat-e-Islami Pakistan
