= Alkhidmat Foundation Pakistan =

Non-governmental organization

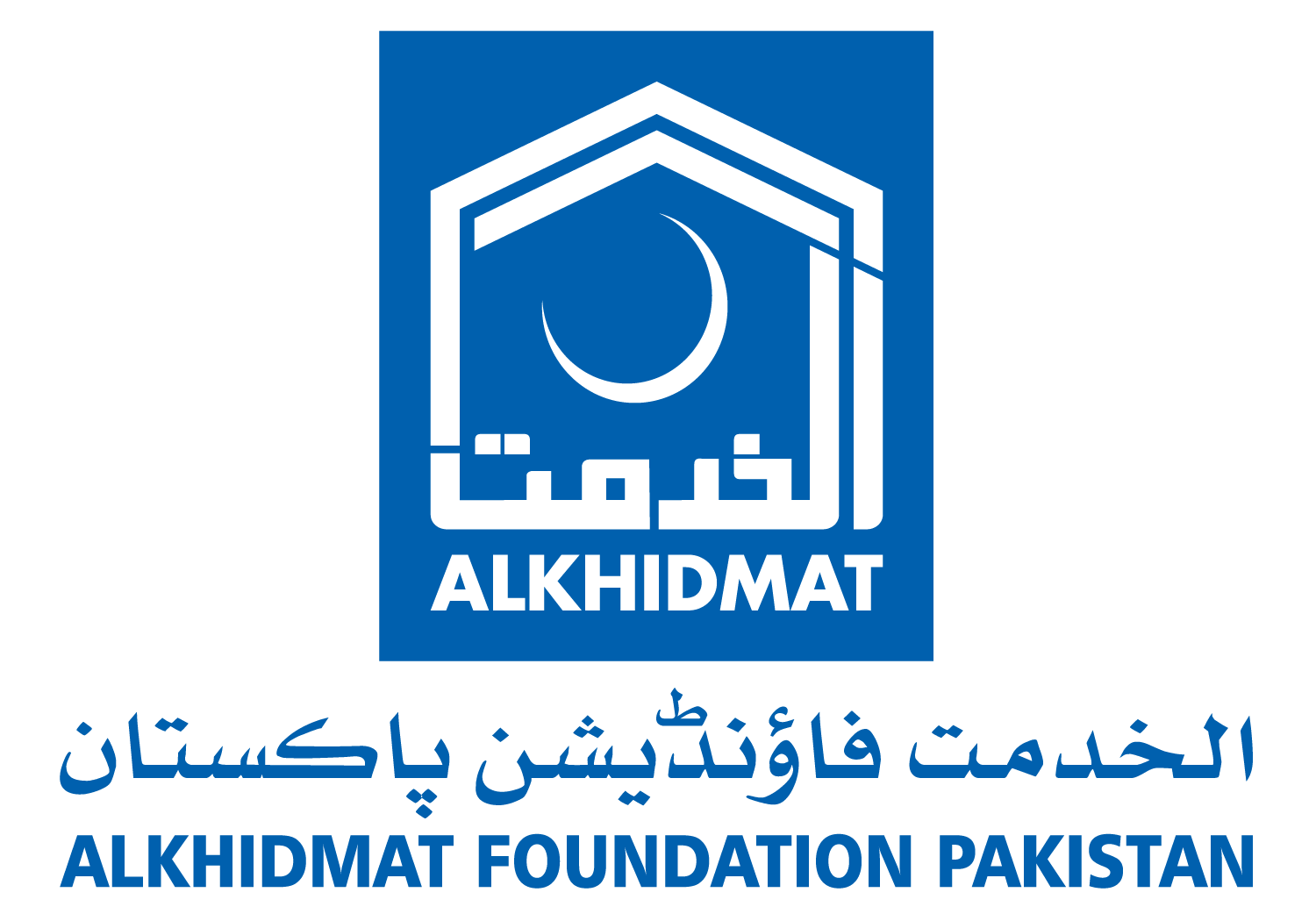
- الخدمت فاؤنڈیشن پاکستان
- Abbreviation: AKFP, AKF
- Formation: 1990; 36 years ago
- Type: NGO, Nonprofit
- Headquarters: Alkhidmat Complex, 3 Km Khayaban-e-Jinnah, Lahore, Pakistan
- Services: Disaster Management, Health Care, Clean Water, Orphan Care, Education, Islamic Microfinance, Community Services, Bano Qabil (Free IT Services)
- Secretary General: Syed Waqas Anjum Jafri
- President: Dr Hafeez ur Rahman
- Key people: Abdus Shakoor, Dr. Mushtaq Mangat
- Volunteers: 60000
- Website: https://alkhidmat.org

Alkhidmat Foundation Pakistan (Urdu: الخدمت فاؤنڈیشن پاکستان) is a non-governmental and non-profit organization that provides humanitarian and social welfare services to communities across Pakistan as the welfare wing of Jamaat-e-Islami Pakistan. The Foundation has been known for its active involvement in disaster management, healthcare, education, and orphan care for over three decades. Other services include child protection, clean water, mawakhat (interest-free loans), and community development.

== History ==
Alkhidmat Foundation Pakistan was officially registered as a non-governmental organization in 1990. However, its humanitarian and relief record dates back to Pakistan's independence, initially providing the community with safe houses and focusing on their treatment and care, which became the trademark of Alkhidmat Foundation Pakistan.

Alkhidmat Foundation Women Wing Trust, with the same mission but with a separate structure and organisation, is a registered NGO established in 1990. The Women Wing Trust is dedicated to philanthropy, education, and empowerment for women.

Alkhidmat is headquartered in Lahore and has 150 offices with full-time paid staff, but its leadership of one thousand people works voluntarily without receiving any honorarium. It has around 60,000 volunteers who work year-round, especially during times of disasters, to provide services across Pakistan.

In 2010, Alkhidmat received financial support of US$407,318 (Rs.33.95 million approx) from the Government of Japan to support the flood-affected people in Charsadda, Khyber Pakhtunkhwa.

In 2019, Alkhidmat visited Qatar to enlist the support and goodwill of the Pakistani community.

In 2020, Alkhidmat arranged a prestigious ceremony at Alkhidmat Complex, Lahore, to honor the volunteers who exhibited extraordinary spirit in undertaking humanitarian relief activities during the COVID-19 pandemic in Pakistan.

In 2022, Alkhidmat launched Bano Qabil initiative to stabilize youth financially. Alkhidmat set to launch rehabilitation and reconstruction activities to help the natural disaster victims return to normal life. The same year, Alkhidmat distributed Christmas gifts and rations among 1,500 underprivileged individuals belonging to the Christian community.

In 2023, Alkhidmat and the National University of Computer and Emerging Science (NUCES) signed a Memorandum of Understanding to promote academia-industry linkages and other areas of mutual interest.

Alkhidmat Foundation Pakistan was awarded the 'Supreme Sacrifice of the Republic of Turkiye' by President Recep Tayyip Erdoğan for its pivotal role in search, rescue, and aid operations following a significant earthquake in Turkey on February 6. The award was received by Ikram ul Haq Subhani, President of Alkhidmat South Punjab, in recognition of the organization's outstanding contributions.

Alkhidmat and Aghosh UK, a UK-based charity organization, has collaborated and raised £370,000 ($454,000) in charity during dinners held in Manchester, Bradford, London, Milton Keynes, and Birmingham for the earthquake victims of Turkey and Syria. A cricket bat with signatures from Pakistani players was auctioned during the fundraising events at the dinners.

== Programs ==
=== Alkhidmat Foundation Health Projects ===
Alkhidmat Foundation Health Projects has implemented various programs to provide basic healthcare and nutritious food for underprivileged communities in Pakistan. Alkhidmat's Health and Nutrition programs include mobile medical camps, health and nutrition centers, vaccination drives, mother and child health, and food assistance.

According to a report of Arab News, Alkhidmat Foundation Pakistan took lead in coronavirus activities in Pakistan by effectively responding to the pandemic.

Alkhidmat set up the hospital in response to the deaths of hundreds of children in the Thar desert region in 2014, resulting from severe drought and malnutrition. With 60 beds, the hospital provides free medical services to the underprivileged population, who would otherwise be unable to afford medical treatment.

In July 2023, Al-Khidmat Foundation hosted a luncheon and provided sacrificial meat to transgender individuals and artists, aiming to integrate them into Eid-ul-Adha celebrations and promote inclusivity. The event, held in Peshawar highlighting the foundation's commitment to addressing societal challenges. The initiative's positive reception underscores the importance of mainstreaming marginalized communities and fostering an inclusive environment.

=== Alkhidmat Foundation: Disaster Management Projects ===
Alkhidmat Foundation Pakistan actively responds to emergencies and disasters, providing relief and rehabilitation services to the affected communities, while exemplifying inclusivity by extending its support to all members of society, including minorities and the intersex community. The organization runs disaster preparedness programs, provides emergency supplies and shelter, and works with local communities to rebuild their homes and livelihoods.

United Nations (UN) Secretary-General Antonio Guterres, during his official tour to Pakistan in the wake of terrible floods highly appreciated Alkhidmat Foundation Pakistan for its awesome relief and rescue efforts.

Amidst the devastating floods of 2023 in Pakistan, Alkhidmat's efforts were acknowledged by intersex individuals, highlighting the organization's dedication to caring for vulnerable populations during times of crisis. The intersex community is engaged in raising funds for the unfortunate ones along with Alkhidmat Foundation.

In response to the World Health Organization's assessment of the precarious situation faced by 650,000 pregnant women in flood-affected areas, Alkhidmat took swift action by launching the "Safe Mother, Safe Family" program.

Following a devastating earthquake on February 6, 2023, in Turkey and Syria, Alkhidmat Foundation Pakistan quickly mobilized relief efforts by collaborating with its partners in the country. Alkhidmat urged Pakistani students to join the relief teams and help save lives in the earthquake-affected areas.

Since 7 October, Alkhidmat is working in Gaza war to provide relief to affected families and displaced people. From Pakistan, it was the first charity to send aid for people in Palestine.

=== Alkhidmat Foundation Educational Projects ===
Alkhidmat Foundation Educational Projects improve access to education for underprivileged children in Pakistan. Its programs include schools and educational institutions, school adoption programs, scholarship programs, vocational training, and education support. Alkhidmat also runs scholarship program with the name of Alfalah Scholarship scheme to enable talented and deserving students to continue their education.

=== Alkhidmat Foundation Orphan Care Homes ===
Alkhidmat Foundation Orphan Care Homes aim to support and care for orphaned children through various programs, including the Orphan Family Support Program and Aghosh Homes.

- Orphan Family Support Program - It financially and emotionally supports families who have lost their breadwinners. It also offers educational support, medical assistance, and monthly financial aid to orphaned children.
- Aghosh Homes - These orphan care homes provide shelter, food, education, and medical facilities to orphaned children. Alkhidmat currently operates a total of 21 Aghosh homes across the country.

=== Microfinance Program (Mawakhat) ===
Microfinance Program (Mawakhat) provides small and interest-free loans to underprivileged individuals in Pakistan to help them start or expand their businesses. Alkhidmat's Mawakhat program includes dedicated efforts to empower and support the transgender community, fostering economic independence and livelihood opportunities.

== Awards and recognition ==
Alkhidmat Foundation was honored with the prestigious "Pride of Performance" award from Turkish President Recep Tayyip Erdogan for its commendable services in the earthquake-affected areas of Turkey.
