= Qazi Hussain Ahmad =

Islamist political party president (1938 – 2013)

- قاضی حسین احمد

3rd Emir of Jamaat-e-Islami
- In office 7 October 1987 – 29 March 2009
- Preceded by: Mian Tufail Mohammad
- Succeeded by: Munawwar Hassan

President of Muttahida Majlis-e-Amal
- In office 10 October 2002 – 18 February 2008
- Preceded by: Shah Ahmad Noorani
- Succeeded by: Alliance collapse

Member of the National Assembly of Pakistan
- In office 18 November 2002 – 23 July 2007
- Constituency: NA-5 (Nowshera-I)

Member of the Senate of Pakistan
- In office 1986–1996

Personal details
- Born: 12 January 1938 Nowshera, NWFP, British India
- Died: 5 January 2013 (aged 74) Islamabad, Pakistan
- Resting place: Ziarat Kaka Saheb, Nowshera
- Party: Jamaat-e-Islami
- Children: 4
- Education: University of Peshawar (BSc, MSc)
- Occupation: Foreign policy commentator, religious leader
- Profession: Professor; Religious leader

Qazi Hussain Ahmad (Urdu: قاضی حسین احمد; born 12 January 1938 – 5 January 2013) was an Islamic scholar, pro-Islamic democracy activist and former Emir of Jamaat-e-Islami, the social conservative Islamist political party in Pakistan.

He opposed the United States' participation in the war against the Taliban in neighbouring Afghanistan.

== Early life ==
=== Background ===
Ahmad was born to ethnic Pashtun parents in 1938 in the house of Muhammad Abdul Rab at Ziarat Kaka Sahib, Nowshera District, Khyber-Pakhtunkhwa, Pakistan.

A teacher by profession, Ahmad was appointed as the President of Jamiat-e-Ulema-e-Hind for its Khyber-Pakhtunkhwa branch before 1947. Qazi Hussain Ahmed was the youngest among his ten siblings.

After having completed early education at home, Ahmad was admitted to Islamia College, Peshawar and got his Master of Science (MSc) degree in geography from Peshawar University. He served as a lecturer at Jehanzeb College Swat for three years, teaching at the graduate level. After that, he started his own business. He was elected as vice-president, Khyber-Pakhtunkhwa (Provincial) Chamber of commerce and industry. Living in Khyber-Pakhtunkhwa gave him some familiarity with political affairs in neighboring Afghanistan.

=== Personal life ===
Ahmed had two sons (Asif Luqman Qazi and Anas Farhan Qazi) and two daughters. His wife and children all are Jamaat-e-Islami activists. He spoke Urdu, English, Arabic, and Persian in addition to his native tongue, Pashto. He was a great admirer of the poet Allama Muhammad Iqbal and employed quotes from both Iqbal's Urdu and Persian poetry in his speeches and conversations.

== Political career ==
His association with the Islamic Movement started in his school days when he first joined Islami Jamiat-e-Talaba, Pakistan. He became member of Jamaat-e-Islami in 1970 and was elected to the office of President of its Peshawar branch. He served Jamaat-e-Islami as Secretary and then Ameer of its Khyber-Pakhtunkhwa provincial branch. After the resignation of Maulana Naeem Siddiqui, he was promoted to the office of Secretary General, Jamaat-e-Islami Pakistan in 1978. and then elected as Ameer (Chief) of Jamaat-e-Islami Pakistan in 1987, continued to serve in that capacity, getting re-elected four more times (1992, 1994, 1999 and 2003). In 2008, Syed Munawwar Hasan was elected to head Jamaat-e-Islami, when Qazi Hussain Ahmad chose not to run for the office. Qazi Hussain Ahmad remained head of Jamaat-e-Islami for nearly 22 years.

In the Parliament of Pakistan, he also served as the parliamentary leader of Muttahida Majlis-e-Amal.

=== Politics ===
Within Pakistan, he was a patron of organisations such as Pasban and founder of Shabab e Milli, youth wing of Jamaat-e-Islami.

Qazi Hussain Ahmad was first elected as member of the Senate of Pakistan in 1986 for a term of six years. He was re-elected for that position in March 1992. To protest against the corrupt political system, he resigned as a Senator in 1996. He was elected as a Member of National Assembly in the 2002 Pakistani general election from his native town, Nowshera.

Qazi Hussain Ahmad traveled abroad widely to represent the Jamaat at the international forums, lead goodwill missions, and in a personal capacity to mediate in issues concerning Muslims, such as the Iran–Iraq War and the Persian Gulf War, the Balkan (Bosnia) crisis and the post-Soviet power struggle in Afghanistan. Even before the Soviet Union invaded Afghanistan, Qazi Hussain Ahmad was in close contact with Afghan mujahideen and met with top Afghan leaders. He helped build support in Pakistan for the movement and introduce the Afghan jihad to the outside world.

He was a staunch supporter of the Kashmiri insurgency against India and the initiator of the Kashmir Solidarity Day.

=== Successful Long March ===
On 20 July 1996, started protests against the government alleging corruption. Qazi Hussain resigned from the senate on 27 September and announced to start a long march against the Benazir's government. Protests started on 27 October 1996 by Jamaat e Islami and the opposition parties. On 4 November 1996, Benazir Bhutto's government was dismissed by President Farooq Leghari primarily because of corruption.

== Death ==
Qazi Hussain Ahmad died of a heart attack late in the evening on Saturday, 5 January 2013, at a son's house in Islamabad.

== Books ==
=== By him ===
- Shari'at Bill: Uski Zarurat Awr Us Par I'tirazat Ja'izah, Lahore : Mutahhidah Shari'at Mahaz, 1986.
- Inqilābī qiyādat, Karachi : Saba Publications, 1988, 109 p. Memoirs, arranged by K̲h̲urram Badr.

=== About him ===
- K̲h̲urram Badr, Muḥabbaton kā safar, Karachi : Saba Publications, 1988, 136 p. Reports of a meet-the-public tour of the country.
- Arshad Baloch (ed.), Qāz̤ī yā bāg̲h̲ī?, Lahore : ʻIlm Dost Publications, 2002, 184 p. Collection of articles on Qazi Hussain.
- Kāmrān Rajpūt, Qāẓī Ḥusain Aḥmad kī dīnī aur siyāsī k̲h̲idmāt, Lahore : Shirkatulimtiyāz, 2005, 368 p. Political biography.
- Jamāl ʻAbdullāh ʻUs̲mān (ed.), ʻAzīz-i jahān Qāẓī Ḥusain Aḥmad, Islāmābād : Idārah-yi Fikr va ʻAmal, 2014, 387 p. Collection of condolence notes.

== See also ==
- Naeem Siddiqui
- Abdul Ghafoor Ahmed
- Israr Ahmed
- Wahiduddin Khan
- Javed Ahmad Ghamidi
- Nowshera District
- Akora Khattak

Party political offices
Preceded by Mian Tufail Mohammad	Ameer of Jamaat-e-Islami; 1987–2009	Succeeded by Syed Munawar Hasan
