= Mansoorah, Lahore =

Residential neighbourhood in Lahore, Pakistan

Mansoorah, Lahore منصورہ
- Neighbourhood
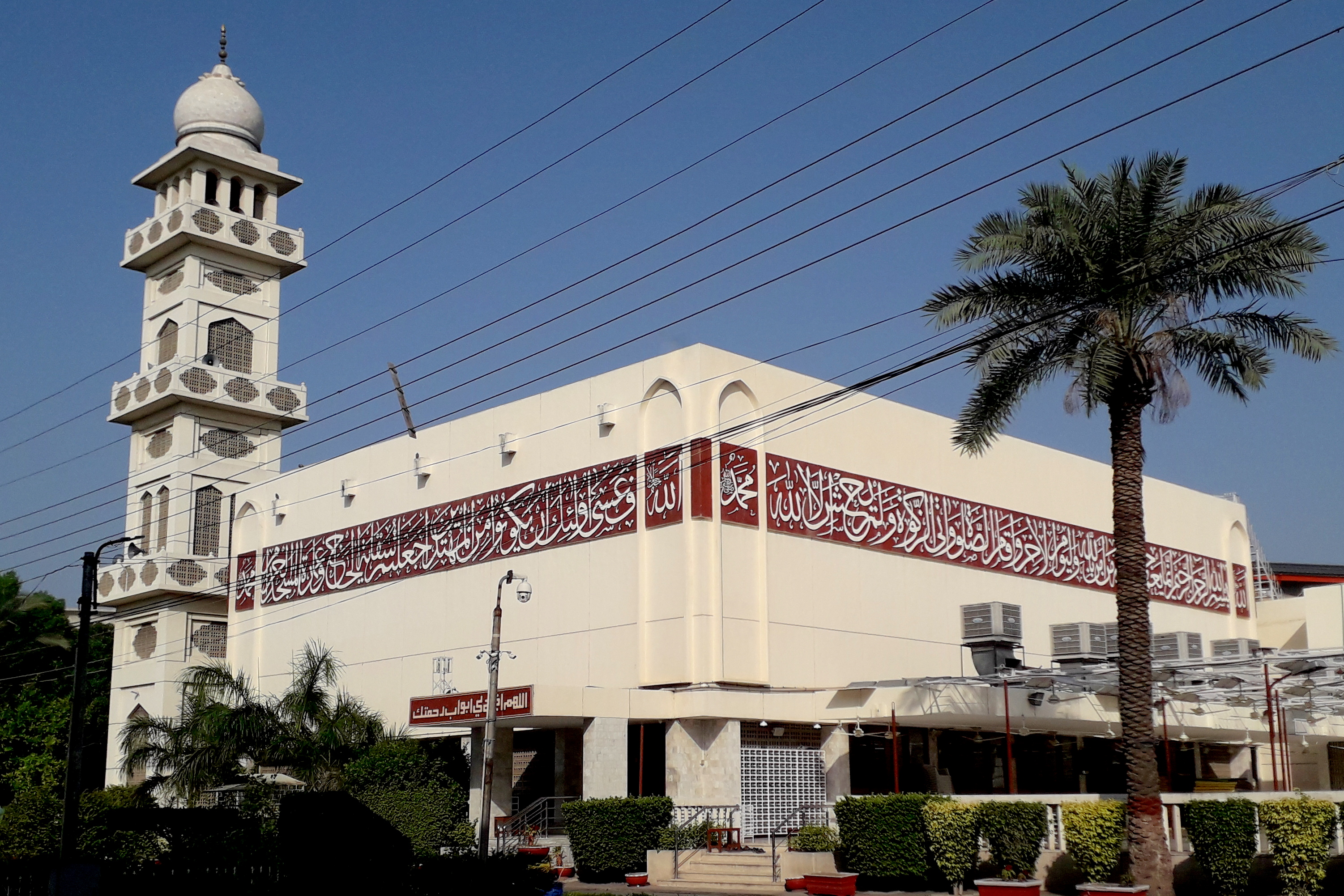
- Mansoorah Mosque
- Country: Pakistan
- Province: Punjab
- City: Lahore
- Administrative town: Iqbal Town
- Union council: 117 (Hanjarwal)

Mansoorah (Punjabi, Urdu: منصورہ) is a neighbourhood located within union council 117 (Hanjarwal) on Multan Road, Lahore, Punjab, Pakistan.

== See also ==
- Jamaat-e-Islami Pakistan
- Sayyid Abul Ala Maududi
- Professor Ghafoor Ahmed
