= Jiy =

- Municipality
- Location within Azerbaijan
- Coordinates: 38°57′57″N 48°21′46″E
- Country: Azerbaijan
- Rayon: Yardymli

Population
  - Total: 218
- Time zone: UTC+4 (AZT)
  - Summer (DST): UTC+5 (AZT)

Jiy (also, Zhiy and Juy) is a village and municipality in the Yardymli Rayon of Azerbaijan. It has a population of 218.
