= Jamaat-e-Islami Pakistan =

Far-right Pakistani political party

Jamaat-e-Islami Pakistan جماعت اسلامی پاکستان
- Abbreviation: JIP
- Leader: Hafiz Naeem ur Rehman
- Secretary-General: Vacant
- Naib Emir(s): Liaqat Baloch; Usama Razi; Dr.Atta-ur-Rehman; Mian Aslam; Muhammad Ibrahim Khan
- Founder: Abul A'la Maududi
- Founded: 1947; 79 years ago
- Preceded by: Jamaat-e-Islami
- Headquarters: Multan Road, Mansoorah, Lahore, Pakistan
- Newspaper: Daily Jasarat
- Student wing: Islami Jamiat-e-Talaba
- Youth wing: JI Youth
- Women's wing: Jamaat-e-Islami Women's Wing
- Labour wing: National Labour Federation
- Welfare Wing: Alkhidmat Foundation Pakistan
- Research Wing: The Islamic Foundation
- Ideology: Islamism; Islamic democracy; Pan-Islamism; Islamic revivalism; Social conservatism; Fascism
- Political position: Far-right
- National affiliation: HDTB; TTAP
- International affiliation: Jamaat-e-Islami
- Colors: Green, white, blue
- Senate of Pakistan: 0 / 100
- National Assembly of Pakistan: 0 / 336
- Provincial Assembly of Balochistan: 1 / 65
- Provincial Assembly of Khyber Pakhtunkhwa: 0 / 128
- Provincial Assembly of Sindh: 1 / 168
- Provincial Assembly of Punjab: 0 / 371
- Gilgit-Baltistan Legislative Assembly: 0 / 33
- Azad Kashmir Legislative Assembly: 0 / 49

Election symbol
- Pan balance

Party flag

Website
- www.jamaat.org (in Urdu)

The logo used on Jamaat-e-Islami Pakistan's Facebook page.

Jamaat-e-Islami Pakistan (JIP; Urdu: جماعت اسلامی پاکستان, romanized: Jamāt-e-Islāmī Pākistān) is a far-right Pakistani Islamist political party and pressure group. It is the Pakistani chapter of the Jamaat-e-Islami, a global Islamic movement founded in British India in 1941. JIP is a vanguard party, whose members are intended to be leaders spreading party beliefs and influence. JIP members are sometimes called Rafīq (meaning comrade in Arabic). Supporters not thought qualified to be members may become affiliates, and beneath them are sympathisers. The party leader is called an ameer. Although it does not have a large popular following, the party is quite influential and considered one of the major Islamic movements in Pakistan, along with Deobandi and Barelvi (represented by Jamiat Ulema-e Islam political party and Jamiat Ulema-e-Pakistan party respectively).

Jamaat-e-Islami was founded in Islamia Park, Lahore, British India in 1941 by the Muslim theologian and socio-political philosopher, Abul A'la Maududi. At the time of the Indian independence movement, Maududi and the Jamaat-e-Islami actively worked to oppose the partition of India. In 1947, following the partition of India, the Jamaat split into two organisations, Jamaat-e-Islami Pakistan and Jamaat-e-Islami Hind (the Indian wing). Other wings of Jamaat include Jamaat-e-Islami Kashmir, founded in 1953, Jamaat-e-Islami Azad Kashmir founded in 1974, and most notably Bangladesh Jamaat-e-Islami, founded in 1979, which remains the country's main parliamentary opposition.

Jamaat-e-Islami Pakistan came under severe government repression in 1948, 1953, and 1963. During the early years of the regime of General Zia-ul-Haq, Jamaat-e-Islami's position improved, and it became seen as the regime's ideological and political arm, with party members at times holding cabinet portfolios of information and broadcasting, production, water, power, and natural resources.

In 1971, during the Bangladesh Liberation War, JIP militarily opposed the independence of Bangladesh and participated in the genocide and other mass atrocities. However, in 1979, it established Bangladesh Jamaat-e-Islami with Abbas Ali Khan as the first ameer. Since the early 1980s, it has also developed close links with Jamaat-e-Islami Kashmir and acted as the vanguard of the armed insurgency in that province.

== History ==
Growth of JIP
Year	Members (Arkan)	Sympathisers and workers (Hum-Khayal)
1941	75	(unknown)
1951	659	2,913
1989	5,723	305,792
2003	16,033	4.5 million
2017	37,000	(unknown)
SOURCE: Encyclopedia of Islam & the Muslim World (2004)

=== Syed Abul A'la Maududi (1941–1972) ===
Jamaat-e-Islami's founder and leader until 1972 was Abul A'la Maududi, a widely read Islamist philosopher and political commentator, who wrote about the role of Islam in South Asia. His thought was influenced by many factors including the Khilafat Movement; Mustafa Kemal Atatürk's ascension at the end of the Ottoman Caliphate; and the impact of Indian Nationalism, the Indian National Congress and Hinduism on Muslims in India. He supported what he called "Islamisation from above", through an Islamic state in which sovereignty would be exercised in the name of Allah and Islamic law (sharia) would be implemented. Maududi believed politics was "an integral, inseparable part of the Islamic faith, and that the Islamic state that Muslim political action seeks to build" would not only be an act of piety but would also solve the many (seemingly non-religious) social and economic problems that Muslims faced.

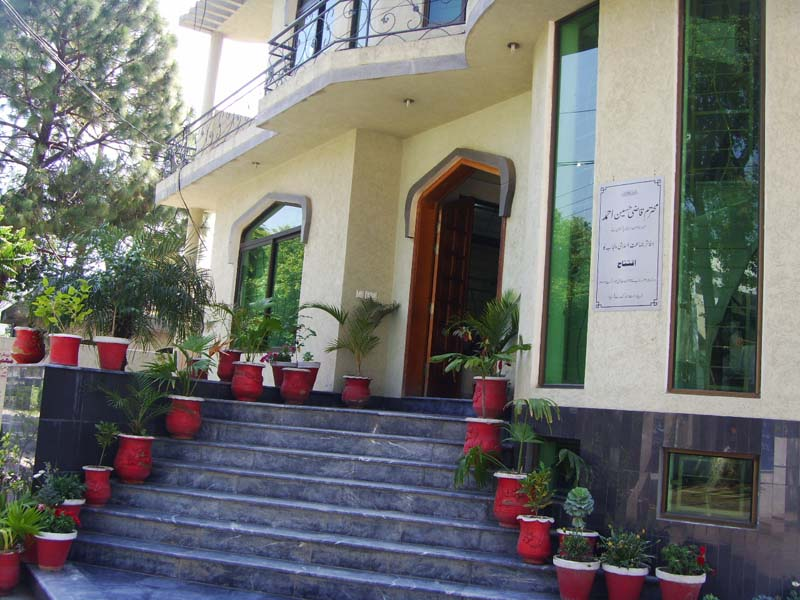
Jamaat-e-Islami Headquarter in Lahore

Maududi opposed British rule but also opposed the Muslim nationalist movement (nationalism being un-Islamic) and their plan for a circumscribed "Muslim state". Maududi agitating instead for an "Islamic state" covering the whole of India – this even though Muslims made up only about one quarter of India's population.

Jamaat-e-Islami thus actively opposed the partition of India, with its leader Maulana Abul A'la Maududi arguing that the concept violated the Islamic doctrine of the ummah. The Jamaat-e-Islami saw the partition as creating a temporal border that would divide Muslims from one another.

=== Founding of JIP in colonial India ===
Jamaat-e-Islami was founded in colonial India on August 26, 1941 at Islamia Park in the city of Lahore, before the Partition of India. JIP began as an Islamist social and political movement. Seventy-five people attended the first meeting and became the first members of the movement. Maulana Amin Ahsan Islahi, Maulana Naeem Siddiqui, Maulana Muhammad Manzoor Naumanai and Maulana Abul Hasan Ali Hasani Nadwi (although he left after a few years) were among the founders of Jamaat-e-Islami along with Syed Abul Ala Maududi.

Maududi saw his group as a vanguard of Islamic revolution following the footsteps of early Muslims who gathered in Medina to found an Islamic state. JIP was and is strictly and hierarchically organised in a pyramid-like structure, working toward the common goal of establishing an ideological Islamic society, particularly though educational and social work, under the leadership of its emirs (commanders or leaders). As a vanguard party, its fully-fledged members (arkan) are intended to be leaders and devoted to the party, but there is also a category of much more numerous sympathisers and workers (karkun).

The emir is obliged by the party constitution to consult an assembly called the shura. The JIP also developed sub-organisations, such as those for women and students. JIP began by volunteering in refugee camps; performing social work; opening hospitals and medical clinics, and gathering the skins of animals sacrificed for Eid-ul-Azha.

JIP had a number of unique features. All members, including its founder Mawdudi, uttered the shahadah – the traditional act of converts to Islam – when they joined. This was a symbolic gesture of conversion to a new Islamic perspective, but to some implied that "the Jamaat stood before Muslim society as Islam before jahiliyah" (pre-Islamic ignorance). After Pakistan was formed, it forbade Pakistanis to take an oath of allegiance to the state until it became Islamic, arguing that a Muslim could in clear conscience render allegiance only to God.

=== Pakistan ===
Creation and early years Following the Partition of India, Maududi and JIP migrated from East Punjab to Lahore in Pakistan. There they volunteered to help the thousands of refugees pouring into the country from India – performing social work; opening hospitals and medical clinics; and by gathering the skins of animals sacrificed for Eid-ul-Azha.

During the prime-ministership of Huseyn Shaheed Suhrawardy (September 1956 – October 1957), JIP argued for a separate voting system for different religious communities. Suhrawardy convened a session of the National Assembly at Dhaka and, through an alliance with Republicans, his party passed a bill for a mixed voting system.

In 1951, it ran candidates for office, but did not do well. JIP found it was more successful in promoting its cause in the streets. The election also occasioned a split in the party, with the JIP shura passing a resolution in support of the party withdrawing from politics, but Maududi arguing for continued involvement. Maududi prevailed, and several senior JIP leaders resigned in protest. All this strengthened Maududi's position still further, and "a cult of personality began to grow up around him."

In 1953, JIP led "direct action" against the Ahmadiyya, whom the JIP believed should be declared non-Muslims. In March 1953, riots in Lahore started, leading to looting, arson, and the killing of at least 200 Ahmadis and the declaration of selective martial law. The military leader, Azam Khan, had Maududi arrested and Rahimuddin Khan sentenced him to death for sedition (writing anti-Ahmadiyya pamphlets). Many JIP supporters were imprisoned during this time.

The 1956 Constitution was adopted after accommodating many of the demands of the JIP. Maududi endorsed the constitution and claimed it was a victory for Islam. In 1958, JIP formed an alliance with Abdul Qayyum Khan (Muslim League) and Chaudhry Muhammad Ali (Nizam-e-Islam Party). The alliance destabilised the presidency of Iskander Mirza (1956–1958), and Pakistan returned to martial law. The military ruler, the president Muhammad Ayub Khan (1958–1964), had a modernising agenda and opposed the encroachment of religion into politics. He banned political parties and warned Maududi against continued religio-political activism. JIP offices were closed down, funds were confiscated, and Maududi was imprisoned in 1964 and 1967.

JIP supported the opposition party, the Pakistan Democratic Movement (PDM). In the 1964–1965 presidential elections, JIP supported the opposition leader, Fatima Jinnah, despite its opposition to women in politics.

In 1965, during the Indo-Pakistani war, JIP supported the government's call for jihad, presenting patriotic speeches on Radio Pakistan and seeking support from Arab and Central Asian countries. The group resisted Zulfikar Ali Bhutto and Maulana Bhashani's socialist program of the time.

By the end of 1969, the Jamaat-e-Islami was spearheading a major "campaign for the protection of the ideology of Pakistan," which it believed was under threat from atheistic socialists and secularists.

JIP participated in the 1970 general election. Its political platform advocated political freedom of the provinces and Islamic law based on the Quran and Sunnah. There would be separation of the powers (judiciary and legislature); basic rights for minorities (such as equal employment opportunities and the Bonus Share Scheme allowing factory workers to own shares in their employers' companies); and a policy of strong relationships with the Muslim world. Just before the election, Nawabzada Nasrullah Khan left the alliance leaving JIP to run against the Pakistan Peoples Party and the Awami League. The party had a disappointing showing when it won only four seats in the National Assembly and four in the provincial assemblies after fielding 151 candidates.

Zulfikar Ali Bhutto won the 1970 election campaign and was strongly opposed by JIP, which believed he and his socialist ideology were a threat to Islam.

Division

JIP opposed the Awami League East Pakistani separatist movement. Islami Jamiat-e-Talaba organised the Al-Badar to fight the Mukti Bahini (Bengali liberation forces). In 1971, during the Bangladesh liberation war, JIP members may have collaborated with the Pakistani army.

In 1968, Maulana Maududi took leave from Emarat of the Jamaat, and Maulana Naeem Siddiqui became the Ameer of Jamat e Islami for one year. In 1969, Maulana took Charge of the Jamaat again. In 1972, Maududi resigned, citing poor health, and Maulana Naeem Siddiqui refused to become the Ameer of the Jamaat due to his research activities. Thus, in October 1972, the Majlis-e-Shoura (council) elected Mian Tufail Mohammad (1914–2009) as the new leader of JIP. Naeeem Siddiqui was chosen as the general secretary.

=== Mian Tufail Mohammad (1972–1987) ===
After Zulfikar Ali Bhutto (1973–1977) was elected, the student wing of the Jamaat-e-Islami (Islami Jamiat-e-Talaba) burned effigies of him in Lahore and declared his election a "black day". In early 1973, the Amir of the JIP even appealed to the army to overthrow Bhutto's government because of "its inherent moral corruption."

JIP "spearheaded" the anti-Bhutto political movement under the religious banner of Nizam-i-Mustafa (Order of the Prophet). Bhutto attempted to suppress JIP through the imprisonment of JIP and Islami Jamiat-e-Talaba members. There were electoral irregularities at the 1975 elections, with JIP members being arrested in order to prevent them from lodging their nomination papers. However, by 1976, JIP had 2 million registrants.

In the 1977 election, JIP won nine of the 36 seats won by the opposition Pakistan National Alliance. The opposition considered the election rigged (Bhutto's PPP won 155 out of 200 seats) and Maududi, who had been arrested, called on Islamist parties to commence a campaign of civil disobedience. The Sunni-led government of Saudi Arabia intervened to secure Maududi's release from prison, warning of revolution in Pakistan. JIP assisted the Pakistan National Alliance (PNA) to oust Bhutto and met with Zia-ul-Haq for ninety minutes on the night before Bhutto was hanged.

Initially, JIP supported General Zia-ul-Haq (1977–1987). In turn, Zia's use of Islamist rhetoric gave JIP importance in public life beyond the size of its membership. According to journalist Owen Bennett-Jones, JIP was the "only political party" to offer Zia "consistent support" and was rewarded with jobs for "tens of thousands of Jamaat activists and sympathisers", giving Zia's Islamic agenda power "long after he died."

However, Zia failed to deliver timely elections and distanced himself from the JIP. When Zia banned student unions, Islami Jamiat-e-Talaba and pro-JIP labour unions protested. However, JIP did not participate in the Pakistan Peoples Party's Movement for the Restoration of Democracy. JIP also supported Zia's Jihad against the Soviet–Afghan War and its sister party Jamiat-e Islami led by Burhanuddin Rabbani became part of the Peshawar Seven that received aid from Saudi Arabia, the United States, and other jihad supporters. Such conundrums caused tension in JIP based on conflict between ideology and politics.

In 1987, Mian Tufail declined further service as head of JIP for health reasons, and Qazi Hussain Ahmad was elected.

=== Qazi Hussain Ahmad (1987–2008) ===
In 1987, when Zia died, the Pakistan Muslim League formed the right-wing alliance, Islami Jamhoori Ittehad (IJI). In 1990 when Nawaz Sharif came to power, JIP boycotted the cabinet on the basis that the Pakistan Peoples' Party and the Pakistan Muslim League were problematic to equal degrees.

In the election of 1993, JIP won three seats. This year, JIP was a member of the newly formed All Parties Hurriyat Conference (APHC), which promotes the independence of Jammu and Kashmir from India.Beforeo this, JIP had allegedly set up the Hizb-ul-Mujahideen, a Kashmir liberation militia to oppose the Kashmir Liberation Front which fights for the complete independence of the Kashmir region.

Ahmad left his position in the Senate in protest against corruption.

=== Successful long march against Bhutto's government ===
On 20 July 1996, Qazi Hussain Ahmed announced to start protests against the government, alleging corruption. Qazi Hussain resigned from the Senate on 27 September and announced the start of a long march against Benazir Bhutto's government. The protest started on 27 October 1996, by Jamaat-e-Islami and opposition parties. On 4 November 1996, Bhutto's government was dismissed by President Leghari primarily because of corruption. JIP then boycotted the 1997 election, and therefore, lost representation in Parliament. However, the party remained politically active, for example, protesting the arrival of the Indian Prime Minister, Atal Bihari Vajpayee, in Lahore.

In 1999, Pervez Musharraf took power in a military coup. JIP, at first, welcomed the general but then objected when Musharraf began to make secular reforms and then again in 2001, when Pakistan joined the war on terror, alleging Musharraf had betrayed the Taliban. JIP condemned the events of 11 September 2001, but equally condemned the US when Afghanistan was invaded. Some members of Al-Qaeda, for example, Khalid Sheikh Mohammed, were arrested in Pakistan.

In the 2002 election, JIP allied with religious parties called Muttahida Majlis-e-Amal (MMA) (lit. 'United Council of Action') and won 53 seats, including most of those representing the Khyber Pakhtunkhwa province. JIP continued its opposition to the war on terrorism, particularly the presence of American troops and agencies in Pakistan. JIP also called for the restoration of the judiciary.

In 2006, JIP opposed the Women's Protection Bill saying it did not need to be scrapped but instead, be applied in a fairer way and be more clearly understood by judges. Ahmed said, "Those who oppose [these] laws are only trying to run away from Islam. ... These laws do not affect women adversely. Our system wants to protect women from unnecessary worry and save them the trouble of appearing in court."

Samia Raheel Qazi, MP and daughter of Ahmed, stated,

"We have been against the bill from the start. The Hudood Ordinance was devised by a highly qualified group of Ulema, and is beyond question".

At least during the time of Ahmad, the position of JIP on revolutionary action was that it was not ready to turn to extra-legal action but that its objectives are definite (qat'i) but its methods are "open to interpretation and adaptation (ijtihadi)" based on the "exigencies of the moment".

On 23 July 2007, Qazi Hussain Ahmad tendered his resignation from the National Assembly to protest against the Army operation at Lal Masjid.

=== Sayyed Munawer Hassan (2008–2014) ===
In 2008, JIP and Pakistan Tehreek-e-Insaf again boycotted the elections. Ahmad declined to stand for re-election due to health issues, and Syed Munawar Hassan was elected as the ameer.

=== Siraj-ul-Haq (2014–2024) ===
On 30 March 2014, Siraj-ul-Haq, serving as senior minister in the Khyber Pakhtunkhwa government and the party's deputy chief, was elected as the new ameer. He replaced the incumbent Munawer Hasan and the party's general secretary, Liaqat Baloch. 25,533 office bearers of the party out of a total of 31,311 voted in these elections. It was the first time that the party had voted out an ameer after just one term. He, therefore, resigned from his role as senior minister. This coincided with a drone attack on a madrassa in Bajaur Agency.

In 2016, Siraj-ul-Haq led funeral prayers for Mumtaz Qadri, who had been executed for assassinating Punjab Governor Salmaan Taseer while serving as his bodyguard. Siraj-ul-Haq called for nationwide protests against the execution of Qadri.

=== Hafiz Naeem ur Rehman (2024-Present) ===
Hafiz Naeem ur Rehman was elected as the Ameer of Jamaat e Islami on 4 April 2024, with his term lasting until April 2029.

== Organisations ==
JIP provides unions for doctors, teachers, lawyers, farmers, workers, and women, for example, Islami Jamiat-e-Talaba (IJT), Jamiat Talaba Arabia, and Islami Jamaat-e-Talibaat (its female branch) a Students' union and JI Youth Pakistan, a youth group.

The party has a number of publications from affiliated agencies such as Idara Marif-e-Islami, Lahore, the Islamic Research Academy, Karachi, Idara Taleemi Tehqeeq, Lahore, the Mehran Academy, and the Institute of Regional Studies. Its print media publications number 22, including the daily Jasarat, weekly Friday Special, weekly Asia, monthly Tarjumanul Quran and fortnightly Jihad-e-Kashmir, with Jasarat in particular having a circulation of 50,000.

The Islami Nizamat-e-Taleem, led by Abdul Ghafoor Ahmed, is an educational body that includes 63 Baithak schools. Rabita-ul-Madaris Al-Islamia supports 164 JIP madrasas. JIP also operates the Hira Schools (Pakistan) Project and Al Ghazali Trust. The foundation administers schools, women's vocational centres, adult literacy programs, hospitals and mobile chemists and other welfare programs. In this respect, JIP interacts with the general market.

In total, there are around 1000 registered madrasas affiliated with the JeI in Pakistan, the province of Khyber Pakhtunkhwa having most of them, with some 245 or nearly a quarter of the total.

=== Jamaat-e-Islami Azad Kashmir ===
An independent wing of Jamaat-e-Islami in Azad Kashmir was started in 1974. According to journalist Arif Jamal, it was done to slow the spread of secular ideas in Azad Kashmir. It had its own amir, Maulana Abdul Bari, who had previously participated in the First Kashmir War (1947) as well as the Operation Gibraltar (1965).

The main activity of the Azad Kashmir wing is noted as the sponsorship of jihad in Indian-administered Kashmir. Bari said that he was called for a meeting with President Zia ul-Haq in 1980, and asked to make preparations. He travelled to the Kashmir Valley and eventually persuaded the leaders of Jamaat-e-Islami Kashmir. However, despite having several groups of Islamist youth trained in militancy, the Kashmiri Jamaat was hesitant to take the plunge. Pakistan's ISI then used the pro-independence Jammu and Kashmir Liberation Front (JKLF) to initiate operations in July 1988. A year later, Jamaat-e-Islami Azad Kashmir sent operatives to Indian-administered Kashmir to bring all the Islamist groups under an umbrella group called Hizbul Mujahideen as a counter to the JKLF. Jointly with Jamaat-e-Islami Pakistan, it also persuaded the Kashmiri Jamaat to take charge of Hizbul Mujahideen by June 1990, and a Jamaat leader called Syed Salahuddin was appointed as its chief.

Jamaat-e-Islami Azad Kashmir also has a student wing called Islami Jamiat-i-Tulaba (IJT). It gained popularity after the founding of Hizbul Mujahideen. Many of its members are said to join the ranks of Hizbul Mujahideen in due course.

=== Connections with terrorism ===
Due to its popularity as an only non sectarian organisation, Jamaat e Islami has been linked to various conpiracies including links with terrorist organisations. Jama'at was said to have close links to many banned outfits of Pakistan. The most notable of them was where a former sympathiser of Jamaat e Islami formed Tehreek-e-Nafaz-e-Shariat-e-Mohammadi. This militant organisation was introduced by Sufi* as an offshoot of Jamaat e Islami and was founded by Sufi Muhammad in 1992 after he left Jamaat-e-Islami. When the founder was imprisoned on 15 January 2002, Maulana Fazlullah, his son-in-law, assumed leadership of the group. In the aftermath of the 2007 siege of Lal Masjid, Fazlullah's forces and Baitullah Mehsud's Tehrik-i-Taliban Pakistan (TTP) formed an alliance. Fazlullah and his army reportedly received orders from Mehsud. After the death of Hakimullah Mehsud in a drone attack, Fazlullah was appointed as the new "Amir" (Chief) of the Tehrik-e-Taliban Pakistan on 7 November 2013. In a May 2010 interview, U.S. Gen. David Petraeus described the TTP's relationship with other militant groups as difficult to decipher: "There is clearly a symbiotic relationship between all of these different organisations: al-Qaeda, the Pakistani Taliban, the Afghan Taliban, TNSM [Tehreek-e-Nafaz-e-Shariat-e-Mohammadi]. And it's very difficult to parse and to try to distinguish between them. They support each other, they coordinate with each other, sometimes they compete with each other, [and] sometimes they even fight each other. But at the end of the day, there is quite a relationship between them."

According to another source, TNSM and Jamaat-e-Islami (JIP) seem to have been locked in a turf war in the Malakand District of Pakistan, and the Jamaat-Ulema-e-Islam, JIP, and TNSM are in conflict with each other in the tribal areas for power and influence.

== List of Emirs ==
No.	Name	Term
1	Abul A'la Maududi	1941–1972
2	Mian Tufail Mohammad	1972–1987
3	Qazi Hussain Ahmad	1987–2009
4	Syed Munawar Hassan	2009–2014
5	Siraj-ul-Haq	2014–2024
6	Hafiz Naeem ur Rehman	2024–present

== Leaders ==
- Abul A'la Maududi (1940–1972)
- Naeem Siddiqui
- Mian Tufail Mohammad (1972–1987)
- Qazi Hussain Ahmad (1987–2008)
- Muhammad Athar Qureshi
- Syed Munawar Hassan (2008–2014)
- Siraj-ul-Haq (2014–2024)
- Mushtaq Ahmad Khan
- Muhammad Ibrahim Khan
- Khurram Murad
- Liaqat Baloch
- Khurshid Ahmad
- Abdul Ghaffar Aziz
- Hafiz Naeem ur Rehman (2024–present)
- Naimatullah Khan

== See also ==
- Naeem Siddiqui
- Israr Ahmed
- Sayed Ahmad Khan
- Amin Ahsan Islahi
- Delwar Hossain Sayeedi
- Abdul Qader Molla
- Motiur Rahman Nizami
- Merajuddin Khan
- List of Islamic political parties

== Bibliography ==
- Guidere, M. (2012), Historical Dictionary of Islamic Fundamentalism, Scarecrow Press, ISBN 9780810879652
- Schmid, Alex, ed. (2011), The Routledge Handbook of Terrorism Research, Routledge, ISBN 978-0-415-41157-8
- Tomsen, Peter (2011), The Wars of Afghanistan: Messianic Terrorism, Tribal Conflicts, and the Failures of Great Powers, Public Affairs, ISBN 978-1-58648-763-8
- Nasr, Seyyed Vali Reza Nasr (1994), The Vanguard of the Islamic Revolution: the Jamaat-i Islami of Pakistan, I.B.Tauris, ISBN 9780520083691
- Nasr, Seyyed Vali Reza Nasr (1996), Mawdudi and the Making of Islamic Revivalism, Oxford, New York: Oxford University Press, ISBN 9780195357110
- Haqqani, Husain (2005), Pakistan: Between Mosque and Military (PDF), Carnegie Endowment for International Peace, archived from the original (PDF) on 13 October 2017
