= Abdul Ghafoor Ahmed =

Pakistani politician

Abdul Ghafoor Ahmed عبدالغفور احمد

Member National Assembly of Pakistan
- In office 1970–1971

Member 5th National Assembly of Pakistan from NW-132 Karachi-V
- In office 1972–1977

Member Senate of Pakistan
- In office 1978–1979

Personal details
- Born: Abdul Ghafoor Ahmed; 26 June 1927 Bareilly, British India
- Died: 26 December 2012 (aged 85) Karachi, Pakistan
- Citizenship: Pakistani
- Party: Jamaat-e-Islami
- Education: University of Lucknow
- Occupation: Politician, author
- Website: https://profghafoorahmed.com

Abdul Ghafoor Ahmed (Urdu: عبدالغفور احمد; 26 June 1927 – 26 December 2012) was a Pakistani politician who represented Jamaat-e-Islami in National Assembly and Senate of Pakistan in 1970 till 1977. He was a signatory and committee member who prepared the draft of the 1973 Constitution of Pakistan.

== Early life and education ==
Ahmed was born on 26 June 1927 to a Muslim family in Bareilly, British India. He received his early education in his hometown and then earned a master's degree in commerce from University of Lucknow in 1948. After the Partition of India, his family moved to Pakistan where he started his career as politician and finished Industrial Accounts course and won fellowship of Institute of Cost and Management Accountants of Pakistan.

== Political career ==
At the age of 23 Ahmed joined Jamaat-e-Islami as member of youth wing in 1950 after eight years he was elected as the member of the Karachi Metropolitan Corporation (KMC) in 1958. Like Naeem Siddiqui, Israr Ahmad, Javed Ahmad Ghamidi and Khurshid Ahmad, Ahmad also worked closely with Syed Abul Ala Maududi (alternative spelling Syed Maudoodi; often referred to as Maulana Maududi) (1903–1979).

Ahmed was elected twice as member of National Assembly of Pakistan in 1970 and 1977. He participated as signatory and member of National Assembly's drafting committee for the Constitution of Pakistan in 1973. While his second tenure he showed his strong opposition against Zulfiqar Ali Bhutto, then Prime Minister of Pakistan by leading two political alliances named as United Democratic Alliance (UDA) and Pakistan National Alliance (PNA) respectively as general secretary in 1977 till 1978.

Ahmed also remained as senator and appointed as Federal Minister for Industries and Production in 1978 till 1979. He again worked as General secretary of Islami Jamhoori Ittehad (Islamic Democratic Alliance) which was a conservative alliance by several small religious political parties whose major goal was to oppose the Pakistan Peoples Party in elections of that year. Before his death he was serving as Naib Ameer of Jamaat-e-Islami. He was also an author of five books.

== Death ==
Ahmed died at Patel Hospital in Karachi on Wednesday 26 December 2012 at the age of 85. He was suffering from protracted illness for several months and hospitalised for past 10 days. He is survived by three sons and six daughters.

== See also ==
- Naeem Siddiqui
- Sayyid Abul Ala Maududi
- University of Lucknow
- Constitution of Pakistan
