= Naeem Siddiqui =

Pakistani scholar and politician (1916–2002)

Maulana Naeem Siddiqui
- نعیم صدیقی

Personal life
- Born: 5 June 1916 Chakwal, Punjab, British India
- Died: 25 September 2002 (aged 86) Lahore, Punjab, Pakistan
- Education: University of the Punjab

Religious life
- Religion: Islam
- Movement: Jamaat-e-Islami; Tehreek-e-Islami

Maulana Naeem Siddiqui (1916 – 25 September 2002) was a Pakistani Islamic scholar, writer and politician. He was among the founder-members of the Jamaat-e-Islami and a close associate of Abul A'la Maududi and Amin Ahsan Islahi.

== Early life and career ==
Naeem Siddiqui was born on 5 June 1916 at Chakwal, Punjab, British India. He was home-schooled and then from Government High School, Khanpur. He completed Molvi Faazil at Uloom-e-Islamia (institution for Islamic religious sciences) and then got the degrees of "Munshi" (Graduation) and of Munshi Faazil (that was equivalent to master's degree at that time) in Arabic and Persian literature from the University of Punjab, Lahore in 1938. Naeem Siddiqui was among the founder members of Jamaat-e-Islami along with its founder Abul A'la Maududi. However, due to irreconcilable differences with its leadership, he quit Jamaat in 1994 and founded the Islamic religious and political party tehreek e Islami along with his fellows in 1994. In 1996, Tehreek-e-Islami split into two groups, one group was led by Naeem Siddiqui himself while the coordinator of the other group was Hafeez-ur-Rehman Ahsan. Due to the endeavour and mediation of some Arab-countries-based Pakistani friends, both groups were re-united in 1998. He explained the story of the reunion in a letter to his friend Khwaja Maqbool Ellahi in 2001 by saying that our difference was unique and now our union is also unique.

== Contributions ==
=== Literature ===
Siddiqui started his literary career by joining biweekly magazine, Kausar, from Karachi under the editorship of Nasrullah Khan Aziz. Later, he joined the monthly Charagh-i-Rah and remained its editor for nine years. He was instrumental in using the above outlets to disseminate Islamic knowledge and raise awareness on Islamic culture.

He was credited as a poet of a unique style and wrote verses on religious, political and social issues. Through his short stories, poetry and articles in magazines such as the Charagh-i-Rah, he helped in creating a wide audience for Islamic literature and poetry in Pakistan and the Muslim world.

He was also editor of the monthly magazine Tarjuman-ul-Quran for a long time after the death of Maulana Maududi.

== Writings ==
=== Major books ===
Siddiqui is well-known for his biographical work on Islamic prophet Muhammad, Muhsin-e-Insaniyat, or The Benefactor of Humanity. This book describes and explains various stages of prophetic revolution. Furthermore, he is also the author of many books dealing with issues related to the socio-politico-economics system of Islam.

His other major books include:

- Communism ya Islam (کمیونزم یا اسلام) – An ideological critique published 1972, contrasting communist ideology with Islamic principles.
- Ma’rifat‑e‑Maududi / Al‑Maududi – A critical and analytical study of Abul A‘la Maududi’s ideology and movement.
- Taleem ka Tehzeebi Nazariya (تعلیم کا تہذیبی نظریہ, “Civilizational Approach to Education”) – A scholarly exploration of education’s role in building Islamic civilization.
- Pachpan Saala Rifaqqat (پچپن سالہ رفاقت, “Fifty-Five Years of Companionship”) – Memoir reflecting his decades-long association with Maududi; reprinted 2010.
- Tahreeki Shaoor (تحریکی شعور, “Revolutionary Consciousness”) – A pamphlet on political activism.

Other notable works include Haq-o-Batil (1952), Tanjziyati Sirat ke Lawazim, and Islami Iqtisadiyat mein Infiradiyat aur Ijtimaiyyat, covering Islamic economics, ethics, and political theory.

=== Journal & magazine articles ===
Siddiqui served as editor for several influential publications:

- Charagh‑e‑Rah – Urdu monthly, Karachi; he edited multiple issues in the 1950s–60s.
- Tarjuman‑ul‑Quran – Monthly scholarly journal, which he also edited post-Maududi era.

He also authored more than 700 research articles on the matter of socio-politico-economic system of Islam which have been published in various journals such as the monthly Tarjuman-ul-Quran, monthly Siyaraa, monthly Chiraagh-e-Raah, bimonthly Na'shur, weekly Takbeer, weekly Shahab, weekly Asia and weekly Tasneem.

== Death ==
Siddiqui died on 25 September 2002 in Lahore due to ill health at the age of 86. His funeral prayers were offered at the Mansoora Ground. It was led by Mian Tufail Mohammad, former Emir of the Jamaat-e-Islami.
