= City of Pearls =

- Directed by: Shafi Maqbool
- Produced by: Students Islamic Organisation of India, Hyderabad chapter
- Release date: 30 October 2011
- Running time: 38 minutes
- Country: India
- Language: Urdu

City of Pearls: A Tale of Neglected People is a 2011 documentary film produced by the Hyderabad chapter of Students Islamic Organisation of India. The 38-minute documentary captures the paradox between the high-rise buildings, malls, flyovers and the abject poverty and lack of basic amenities in the slums of Hyderabad.

The documentary was released by Syed Qasim Rasool Ilyas, Secretary, Welfare Party of India in a special screening organised at Madina Education Centre, Hyderabad. Muslim intellectuals such as Hamid Mohammed Khan and leaders from various socio-political class were also present.

== See also ==
- Dreams Choked
- Pani Pani Re
