= H Abdul Raqeeb =

Social activist

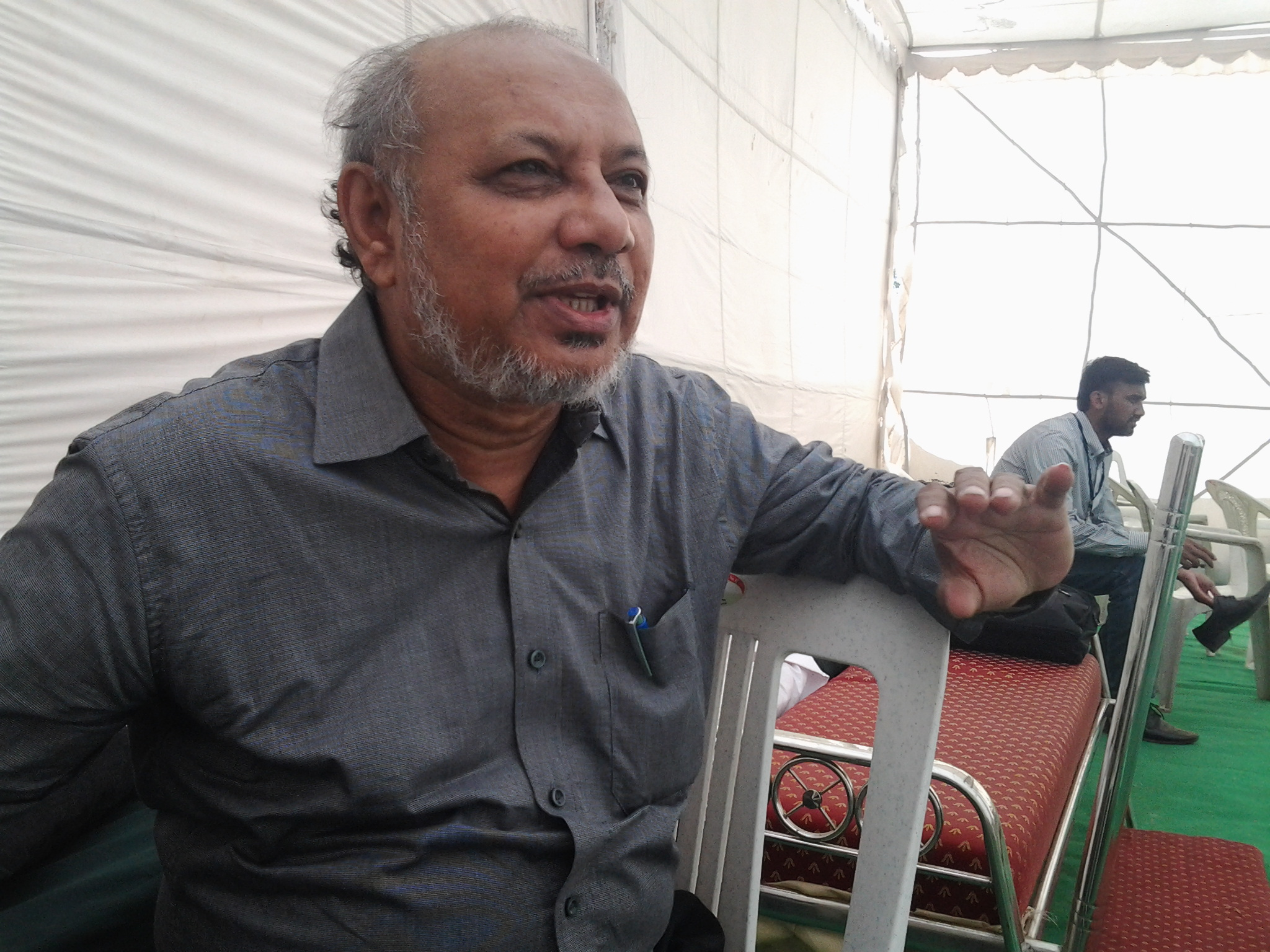

General Secretary of Indian Center for Islamic Finance

Personal details
- Born: Vaniyambadi, Tamil Nadu, India
- Education: B.Sc in Chemistry, Islamia College, Vaniyambadi; Diploma in Leather Technology; M.A. in Journalism and Mass Communication
- Known for: Promoting interest-free banking in India

H Abdur Raqeeb is the General Secretary of Indian Center for Islamic Finance, New Delhi. He has been promoting the concept of interest-free banking throughout India for the last two decades. He aims to bring society closer through an interest-free banking system. To introduce an interest-free banking system in India, he travelled across many countries, learned a working model of interest-free banking, and met with professionals and policymakers across India and abroad.

== Biography ==
He was an editor to a weekly magazine in Tamil known as Samarasam, and was awarded 'The Best Journalist Award' by Islamiya Tamil Islamic Literary Organisation (Tamil Islamic literary organisation) during the First State Conference of the organisation held at Trichirappalli on 17–18 May.

== Current associations ==
- General Secretary, Indian Centre for Islamic Finance, New Delhi
- Convenor, National Committee on Islamic Banking
- Member, All India Muslim Personal Law board
- President, Islami Baithul Maal, Vaniyambadi
- Trustee, Human Welfare Foundation, New Delhi
- Editor, Samarasam (Tamil – Fortnightly)
- Member, Board of Islamic Publications, New Delhi
- Executive Member, JAMIA Darussalam University, Oomerabad

== Islamic finance and banking-related activities ==
- Interacted with Finance Minister, Governor of RBI, Deputy Governor RBI and Deputy Chairman Planning Commission to introduce the concept of Islamic banking in India
- Prepared along with experts a document for Banking Regulations (amendment) Bill to be introduced in Parliament as a private members bill.
- Prepared a document along with experts for Interest free windows along with conventional Banks and submitted to RBI and Finance Ministry.
- Interacted with High Level committee on Financial Sector reforms headed of Planning Commission of India by Dr Reghuram Rajan which mentioned about interest free banking.
- Highlighted in media –need and relevance of Islamic Finance and Banking
- Chairman of the committee which organized an international conference on Islamic banking conducted by Al Jamia Al islamiya in association with Islamic Research and Training Institute of Islamic Development Bank

== See also ==
- Jamaat-e-Islami Hind
- Students Islamic Organisation of India
- Maulana Maududi
- Jalaluddin Umri
