= T. K. Abdullah =

Indian Islamic scholar (1929–2021)

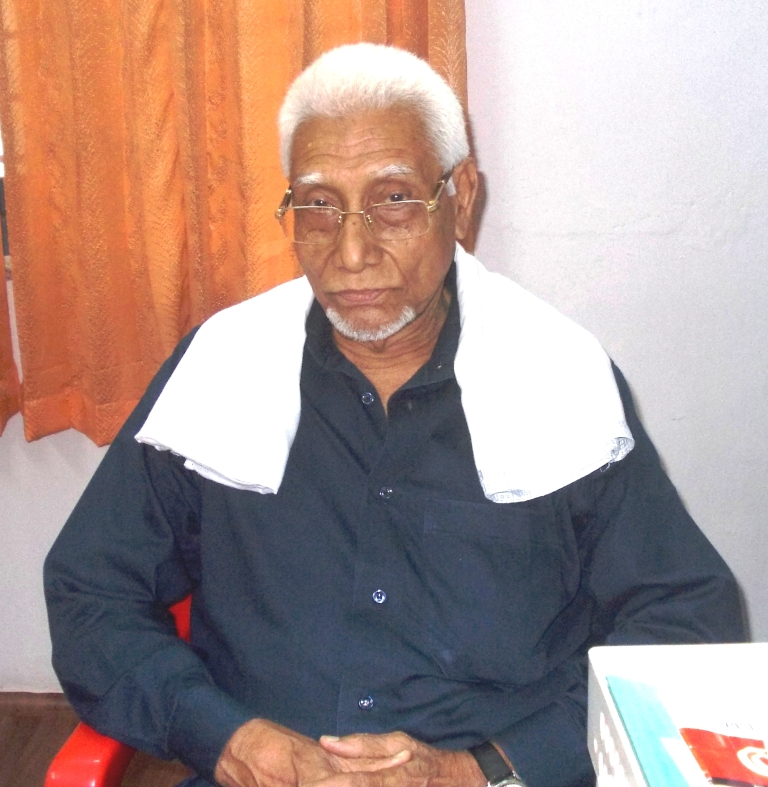
- Born: 1929; Kozhikode, Kerala, India
- Died: October 15, 2021 (aged 91–92); Kozhikode, Kerala
- Occupation(s): Islamic scholar and writer in Malayalam.
- Years active: 1959–2021
- Organization: Jamaat-e-Islami Hind
- Known for: Social work
- Notable work: Nadannu theeratha vazhikalil
- Children: 3

T. K. Abdullah (1929 – 15 October 2021) was an Islamic scholar, senior leader and member of Central Advisory Council of Jamaat-e-Islami Hind. He was a founding member of the All India Muslim Personal Law Board.

== Early life and education ==
T. K. Abdullah was born in 1929 at Ayancheri, a village in Kozhikode District. He completed his education from various Islamic institutes.

== Career ==
=== Editor ===
After joining Prabodhanam in 1950, he became deputy chief editor in 1959. In 1964, while Prabodhanam started weekly, Abdullah was the first chief editor until 1995.

=== Literary works ===
He contributed to translating two volumes of Tafhim-ul-Quran to Malayalam. He was chief editor of "Islamic Encyclopedia Project" being published by Islamic Publishing House. He wrote some books such as Nadannu theeratha vazhikalil, Navothana dharmangal, Nazhikakallukal, Iqbaline kandethal etc.

== Jamaat-e-Islami Leader ==
After getting membership in Jamaat-e-Islami Hind in 1959, he reached the top position in Kerala Jamat (President-Amir) from 1972 to 1979 and from 1982 to 1984 periods. During his leadership, Jamaat-e-Islami Kerala faced the Emergency of 1975. Many of its leaders were jailed during the emergency, including T. K. Abdullah. He was a member of Markazi Majlis-e-Shoora of Jamaat-e-Islami Hind from 1972 until his death.
