= Malik Motasim Khan =

Political leader of India (born 1967)

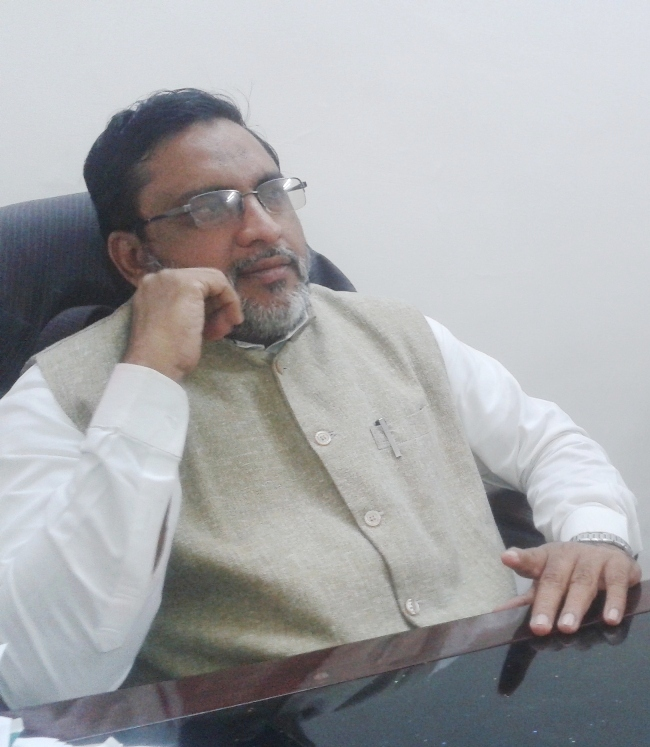
- Born: 5 February 1967 (age 59); Mudhole village of Adilabad District, Telangana
- Organization: Association for Protection of Civil Rights
- Notable credit: Residence: Hyderabad/Nizamabad
- Political party: Welfare Party of India
- Children: 3 daughters and Malik Fouzan Khan Malik Hayyan Ahmed Khan

Malik Motasim Khan (Urdu: ملک معتصم خان) is a member of the Central Advisory Council of Jamaat-e-Islami Hind. He was the President of Andhra Pradesh Chapter of Welfare Party of India. He was the Ameer-e-Halqa (Zonal President) of Jamaat-e-Islami Hind, Andhra Pradesh and Orissa during 2007–2011. He was also the National President of SIO (Students Islamic Organisation of India) for two terms from 1995 to 1999.

Khan graduated in science in 1989 from Nizamabad. He also holds master's degrees in both Political Science and Translation Studies from Jamia Millia Islamia University and Maulana Azad National Urdu University, respectively.

He began teaching at a government high school in Adilabad. His father, Ashfaque Ali Khan, was a well-known teacher in the region.

== Leadership roles ==
Khan joined Students Islamic Organisation of India while he was a high school student. In 1993, he was appointed State Secretary of SIO Andhra Pradesh. Later, he was elected as the State President of SIO Andhra Pradesh and he served in the position between 1993 and 1995.

In 1995, he was elected National President of SIO for a two-year term (1995–97).

He represented SIO at various international conferences. He participated in the 9th IIFSO conference at Istanbul in Turkey. In 1998, Khan participated in the 8th World Assembly of Muslim Youth (WAMY) Conference in Amman, Jordan. Earlier, he received invitations from IIFSO, WAMY, and Islamic Society of North America (ISNA). He also attended IMA Youth Wing's "From Darkness to Light" conference in Kuwait held in 2010 at the Masjid Al Kabir.

Thus, during his presidency, Khan distinguishably fine-tuned his leading abilities. He had been re-elected as President of SIO for another term 1997–99 as a result of his works. He wrote a number of articles on variety of subjects particularly with a view to guiding students and youth.

== Lok Sabha elections 2014 ==
Khan announced his plan to contest Lok Sabha elections from Nizamabad parliamentary constituency, as a preference. He said he belongs to Nizamabad and wants to serve people of his region. He would take up following issues as a priority: Revival of the sugar industry; rail connectivity between Nizamabad and Karimnagar and development of slum areas, among others.

== Telangana region politics ==
Khan holds a very important position in the politics of Telangana region of Andhra Pradesh, especially after the Jamaat's stand on the Telangana movement. He leads the Muslims' struggle for a separate Telangana.

He said during a public meeting called 'Telangana Garjana' that successive state governments had neglected the Telangana region in basic sectors such education, employment, irrigation and industries – not kept many promises made at the time of merger for the development of the region.

In the public meeting, which was organised by the state chapter of Jamaat-e-Islami Hind at the Nizam College grounds in Hyderabad on 7 February 2010, Kalvakuntla Chandrashekar Rao expressed that Muslims would not be assured of social justice unless they got political reservation.

Khan views the Telangana issue as a "social issue" rather than political, regional or the issue of self-respect. He regards Telangana "a victim of injustice" since the formation of Andhra Pradesh.

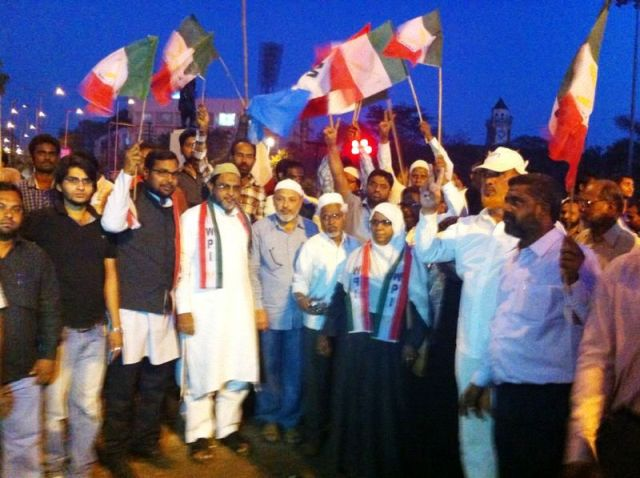
MM Khan along with party workers in Hyderabad celebrating after Lok Sabha cleared T-Bill on 18 February 2014.

== T-Bill (AP Reorganisation Bill) ==
After decades long struggle of people of Telangana region, Lok Sabha and Rajya Sabha cleared the T-Bill allowing bifurcation of Andhra Pradesh, which will result in formation of Telangana as 29th State of India. Following T-Bill clearance in Lok Sabh on 18 February 2014, Khan was spotted celebrating along with his party cadre in Hyderabad. He had been active supporter of Telangana Movement and led the 'Telangana Garjana' in 2010.

== Women/rapes ==
Khan expressed grief and anger on the shameful incident of rape of five-year-old girl in Delhi. He said the government and administration failed to protect women and girls' modesty.

While advocating for effective legislation and strict implementation of laws for the protection of women's modesty, Khan echoed for severe punishment for the culprits. He said WPI gives women political platform and encourages them to take up active part in social and political affairs.

== 2009 general elections ==
In 2009, Khan met the then Chief Minister of Andhra Pradesh Dr. Y. S. Rajasekhara Reddy along with other Jamaat-e-Islami Hind representatives to inform Reddy of the organisation's support for Indian National Congress (Congress Party) in 2009 General Elections in the Indian state.

Prior to announcing the support, Khan launched a 10-day campaign which included Jamaat-e-Islami Hind's public meetings, symposiums and seminars to mobilise public opinion regarding the elections. While addressing a press conference, he said "At the end of the campaign, we will announce our support to a political party." Khan also urged political parties in the state not to support fascist forces and chalk out plans to provide basic amenities such as food, clothes and housing to all the poor. In addition, he stressed on the need for strengthening rural economy and agrarian sector.

== On 4% quota for Muslims ==
The state government's decision, announced in July 2007, to grant Muslims 4% reservations in the public sector and educational institutions had received mixed reactions from the local political community. Khan labelled the decision of the Andhra Pradesh government as a "placatory step" toward easing the critical conditions of the Muslims community.

== Israel attack on Gaza ==
While condemning the brutal attack on Flotilla, Khan considered Israel as the biggest threat to the peace-loving world and urged then ruling Indian government to severe diplomatic relationship with that country immediately. In addition, he asked Arab world to come forward and put diplomatic pressure on Israel to end Gaza siege.

== Political comments ==
Commenting on the hanging of Afzal Guru, Khan called it a "political drama" and noted that the implementation of the judgment was not humanitarian and fair.

== Homosexuality ==
Khan applauded Supreme Court's judgment against Homosexuality considering it to be harmful to the society. He believes that this judgment would help in preventing spread of Homosexuality. He also noted that the judgment has encouraged traditions, culture and values of Indian society. Moreover, he felt the need to stop propaganda of Homosexuality in media and urged for a ban on this propaganda in the name of entertainment.

== See also ==
- Jamaat-e-Islami Hind
- Association for Protection of Civil Rights
- Students Islamic Organisation of India
