= Jamaat-e-Islami =

Islamic movement founded in British India in 1941

- Jamaat-e-Islami in Arabic calligraphy
- Successor: JI Pakistan (1947); JI Hind (1948); JI Kashmir (1953); JI Azad Kashmir (1974); JI Bangladesh (1979)
- Founded: 26 August 1941; 85 years ago
- Founder: Abul A'la Maududi
- Founded at: Islamia Park, Lahore, Punjab, British India
- Emir: Naeem ur Rehman (in Pakistan); Shafiqur Rahman (in Bangladesh); Sadatullah Husaini (in India); M Mushtaq (in Azad Kashmir)
- Affiliations: Muslim Brotherhood; Jamiat-e Islami; UK Islamic Mission; Islamic Forum of Europe

Jamaat-e-Islami (Note: Urdu/Persian: جماعتِ اسلامی, Bengali: জামায়াতে ইসলামী, lit. 'Society of Islam') also known as Party of Islam is an Islamist movement founded in 1941 in British India by the author of Tafhim-ul-Quran, Syed Abul Ala Maududi, who developed a conception of "theo-democracy", whereby a state operates in full accordance with Islamic law in all areas of life, and is ruled by the entire Muslim community. While its founding branch in Pakistan has been labelled fundamental, the Bangladesh Jamaat-e-Islami remains politically dominant, serving as the country's current main opposition party and previously holding ministerial positions through coalition governments.

Jamaat-e-Islami was founded to revive Islamic values across the Indian subcontinent and advocate for an Islamic political system. It was formed on 26 August 1941 in Lahore under the leadership of Maududi, who believed that contemporary political ideologies resulted from Western imperialism, and that it was necessary to implement Sharia to preserve Muslim culture. According to some scholars, the events following the death of Mughal Emperor Aurangzeb Alamgir and loss of his Sharia code of Fatawa Alamgiri, weakened the Muslim authority in the subcontinent, creating an environment in which later thinkers argued for restoring strength through Sharia based governance. Maududi believed politics was "an integral, inseparable part of the Islamic faith," and that Islamic ideology and non-Islamic ideologies (such as capitalism and socialism, liberalism or secularism) were mutually exclusive. He saw the creation of an Islamic state as both act of piety, and a cure for social and economic problems faced by Muslims, which he attributed to Western influence.

Jamaat-e-Islami opposed the partition of India and the creation of Pakistan and actively worked to prevent it. After the partition of India, the organisation spearheaded the movement to transform Pakistan from a Muslim homeland into an Islamic state. Mawdudi's efforts focused on transforming to a "theo-democracy" based on the Sharia which would enforce things like abolition of interest-bearing banks, gender separation, veiling of women, hudud penalties for theft, adultery, and other crimes. Jamaat seeks to spur an Islamic revival, implementing Islam as a universal religion.

India's Jamaat-e-Islami Kashmir movement is banned in the state of Jammu and Kashmir. Since 2003, part of the organisation is designated as a terrorist organisation by Russia for its close relations with the Muslim Brotherhood.

== History ==
=== Founding and opposition to partition ===
Since Emperor Aurangzeb’s reign is widely seen as the most sharia-oriented phase of Mughal rule, exemplified by the pre-British Fatawa 'Alamgiri, scholars admired such earlier periods when rulers attempted to align governance with Islamic law, viewing them as partial historical precedents for what a modern Islamic state might look like, even though he also criticised past Muslim empires for their shortcomings. Mawdudi's concepts of ḥākimiyyah, islamic jurisprudence (fiqh) and moral reform echo themes associated with earlier South Asian Islamic revivalist traditions, including the Mughal-era scholars who advised Aurangzeb. Although Maududi’s ideology was shaped by some modern forces such as colonialism, the Aurangzeb-Islamic era ideal of sharia-based governance is commonly cited as one of the historical influences on his thought.

Maududi opposed British rule but also opposed both the anti-colonialist Muslim nationalist Muslim League's proposal for a separate Muslim state led by Muhammad Ali Jinnah, and the composite nationalism (muttahida qaumiyyat) idea of Jam'iyyat al-Ulama-ye Hind and Deobandi scholar Maulana Sayyid Hussain Ahmad Madani for a united independent India with separate institutional structures for Hindus and Muslims.

In 1940, the Muslim League met in Lahore and passed the Lahore Resolution, calling for autonomous states in the Muslim-majority areas of India. Maududi believed that Islam is a universal religion that calls for a single, globally unified government and therefore nationalism in any form was un-Islamic. In response he launched his own party, Jamaat-e-Islami, founded on 26 August 1941, at Islamia Park, Lahore. Seventy-five people attended the first meeting and became the first 75 members of the movement.

Maududi saw his group as a vanguard of Islamic revolution following the footsteps of early Muslims who gathered in Medina to found the first "Islamic state". Members uttered the Shahada, the traditional statement of conversion to Islam, when they joined, implying to some that Jama'ati felt they had been less-than-true Muslims before joining. Jamaat-e-Islami was and is strictly and hierarchically organised in a pyramid-like structure. All supporters work toward the common goal of establishing an ideological Islamic society, particularly through educational and social work, under the leadership of the emir. Being a vanguard party, not all supporters could be members, only the elite. Below members were/are "affiliates", and "sympathisers" beneath them. The party leader is called an ameer (commander).

Maududi sought to educate the elite of the Muslim community in the principles of Islam and correct "their erroneous ways of thinking" both because he believed societies were influenced from the top down. In his view, Muslims were not one religious or communal group among many working to advance their social and economic interests, but a righteous ideological group capable of transforming India into Dar al-Islam. He believed that a government based on the tenets of Islam would be benevolent to its constituents and would avoid falling into tyranny and oppression, unlike the fascist and communist government structures that were gaining popularity at the time. For his service to Islam, Mawdudi became the first recipient of the Saudi Arabian King Faisal International Award in 1979. Wilfred Cantwell Smith described the ideology as "the most systematic thinker of modern Islam".

At the time of the Indian independence movement, Maududi and the Jamaat-e-Isami actively worked to oppose the partition of India. Maududi argued that the division of India violated the Islamic doctrine of the ummah and believed that the partition would separate Muslims by a temporal boundary. As such, before the partition of colonial India happened, the Jamaat-e-Islami actively worked to prevent it, as he feared the liberalism of its founders and the British-trained administrators. However, when the partition went ahead, Maududi viewed it as a gradual step to the Islamisation of its laws and constitution even though he had earlier condemned the Muslim League for the same approach.

During the years before the partition of India, Jamaat-e-Islami stood aloof from the intense political fights of the time in India, concentrating on "training and organising" and refining and strengthening the structure of Jamaat-e-Islami.

=== After partition ===
After partition, Maududi settled in Pakistan and the group split into two separate organisations on either side of the border: Jamaat-e-Islami Pakistan and Jamaat-e-Islami Hind. Other groups related to or inspired by Jamaat-e-Islami developed in Bangladesh, Britain, and Afghanistan.

The Pakistani branch of the movement has remained the most prominent, due to both their prominence in electoral politics and repression of the group in other countries. In the 1950s, a student wing ideologically linked to JI, Islami Jamiat-e-Talaba, was launched. It successfully gained control of many urban colleges and universities. Jamaat's Pakistan branch actively opposed the split between East and West Pakistan and the creation of Bangladesh during the Bangladesh Liberation War in 1971.

The group has had a presence in Europe since the 1960s. The Jamaat-e-Islami parties maintain ties internationally with other Muslim groups.

Since 2003, the organisation is designated as a terrorist organisation by Russia for its close relations with the Muslim Brotherhood.

Separating from Jamaat-e-Islami Pakistan, Bangladesh Jamaat-e-Islami was established as the Bangladeshi branch of Jamaat-e-Islami by the former activist and members of Jamaat's East Pakistan faction who remained in Bangladesh after the independence of Bangladesh, The Jamaat was banned in the early independence years of Bangladesh and its top leaders had fled to West Pakistan and Saudi Arabia, Sheikh Mujibur Rahman, the first president of Bangladesh, also cancelled the citizenship of Ghulam Azam, the founder and leader of Bangladeshi branch of Jamaat-e-Islami who moved to Pakistan, the Middle East and the UK for political asylum. Sheikh Mujibur Rahman was assassinated in August 1975 by a group of officers of the army and post-Mujibur governments were immediately recognised by both Saudi Arabia and Pakistan, and Jamaat-e-Islami resumed political activities and sixth president of Bangladesh Ziaur Rahman also allowed Azam to return to Bangladesh as the leader of Jamaat-e-Islami. The Bangladesh Jamaat-e-Islami initially formed a government coalition with the BNP, where it held two ministries. Later, the party was declared de facto illegal by the High Court Division of the Supreme Court of Bangladesh in 2018 for abetting the Pakistani Forces perpetrating the Bangladesh genocide of 1971 and its leaders were judicially executed during the Awami League rule. However, after the fall of the government, The decision was reversed by the newly-established interim government in late-August of that year, and in June 2025, the ban on the party was officially lifted and its registration was reinstated by the Appeliate Division of the Supreme Court, allowing it to re-enter as a contender in the 2026 Bangladeshi general election. Bangladesh Jamaat-e-Islami won over 70 seats in the election, forming the primary opposition party. In terms of social reach and membership growth, Bangladesh Jamaat-e-Islami is currently larger and more powerful than any of the Islamic parties in the Asia and as of early 2026, the United States actively engaged with the party and strengthened its diplomatic ties.

== Branches ==
- Jamaat-e-Islami Pakistan, based in Pakistan. In 1947, Jamaat-e-Islami moved its operations to West-Pakistan after Independence.
- Jamaat-e-Islami Hind, based in India. Founded by Jamaat-e-Islami Members who remained in India after 1947 independence.
- Jamaat-e-Islami Kashmir, in the Indian state of Jammu and Kashmir. It was formed in 1953 after the pro-plebiscite prime minister of Jammu and Kashmir was arrested by the Indian government.
- Jamaat-e-Islami AJK, in the Pakistan-administered Kashmir (Azad Jammu and Kashmir), established in 1974.
- Bangladesh Jamaat-e-Islami, based in Bangladesh, established in 1979 consisting of former Jamaat-e-Islami Pakistan members in Bangladesh after the independence in 1971. Currently, it's the dominant and the most influential branch of the movement.

== Associated organisations ==
- Jamiat-e Islami, based in Afghanistan. Founded in 1972 by Burhanuddin Rabbani, it was also said to be inspired by Abul A'la Maududi and the Jamaat-e-Islami party. Predominantly ethnically Tajik, the group was a major player in the "Peshawar Seven" during the jihad against Soviet military in the 1980s.
- The Pakistani branch of Jamaat-e Islami is closely associated with Muttahida Majlis-e-Amal, a political alliance consisting of conservative, Islamist, religious, and right-wing parties of Pakistan. It was founded by Naeem Siddiqui, (founder of Tehreek e Islami the splitter faction of Jamaat-e-Islami) proposed such an alliance of all the religious parties back in the 1990s later it was co-founded and led by Qazi Hussain Ahmed, (notable activist of Jamaat-e-Islami and former emir of its Pakistani branch.
- Hezbi Islami, also based in Afghanistan, broke away from Jamiat-e Islami in 1975–1976. Led by Gulbuddin Hekmatyar, its ethnic make-up was overwhelmingly Ghilzai Pashtun. Its less moderate stance won it the backing of Jamaat-e-Islami Pakistan (and Saudi Arabia and Pakistan president Zia ul-Haq) during the resistance against the Soviet military.
- UK Islamic Mission alongside Islamic Forum of Europe was founded by members of the East London Mosque. Also "inspired by the Jamaat-e-Islami party in Pakistan" and the "Islamic revivalist teachings of Abul A'la Maududi and others."
- Supporters of Jamaat-e Islami also have groups in other states. According to The Columbia World Dictionary of Islamism, Jamaat-e-Islami branches have followed Pakistani immigration to South Africa and Mauritius as well as the UK.

== See also ==
- Qutbism
- Political Islam
- Takfir wal-Hijra
- Islamic schools and branches
