= K. A. Siddique Hassan =

Indian Islamic scholar (1945–2021)

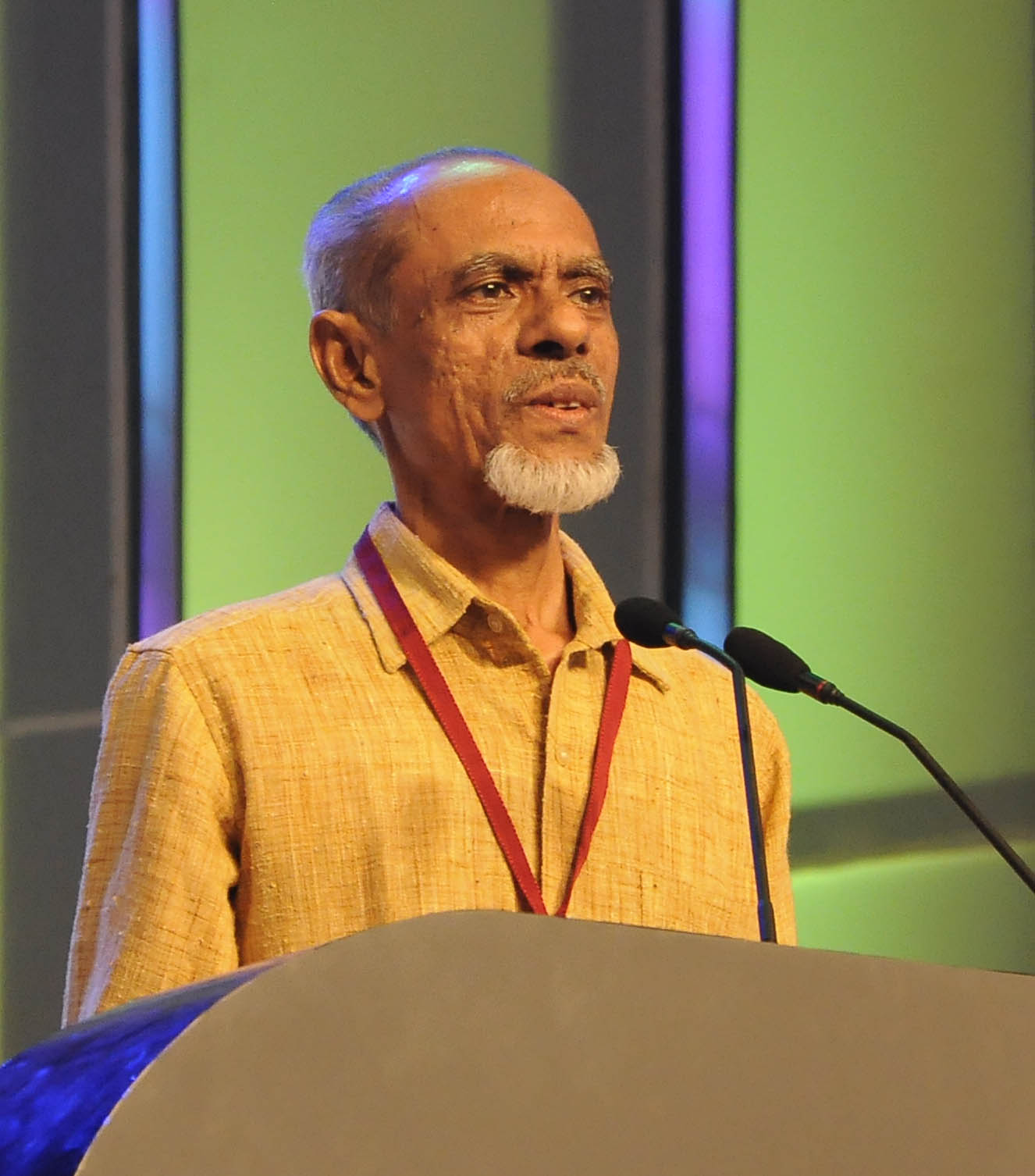
- At Mediaone channel opening ceremony
- Born: 5 May 1945; Eriyad, Thrissur, Kerala
- Died: 6 April 2021 (aged 75); Kozhikode
- Organization: Association for Protection of Civil Rights
- Known for: Community Empowerment, Education

K. A. Siddique Hassan (5 May 1945 – 6 April 2021) was an Islamic scholar, social worker, change-maker and orator from Kerala, India. He was the chief architect of 'Vision 2016' under the aegis of the Human Welfare Foundation (HWF) and Assistant Amir of Jamaat-e-Islami Hind.

Hassan worked as a Professor of Arabic Language and Literature in various colleges in Kerala including University College Thiruvananthapuram and Maharaja's College, Ernakulam. He served as the President of Jamaat-e-Islami Hind, Kerala, from 1990 to 2005. He was a Secretary (2005-2007) and the National Vice president of Jamaat-e-Islami Hind (2007-2015). He was one of the founding members of Madhyamam Daily (and Weekly), now one of the leading newspapers in the State of Kerala and the first Indian newspaper to publish from seven nations. A book was published as a collection of his essays and interviews titled “Indian Muslimkal: Athijeevanathinte Vazhikal” (Malayalam) [Indian Muslims: Paths of Survival] by Vachanam Books, Kozhikode in 2014.

== Initiatives ==
He created and involved in a number of initiatives in his lifetime spanning across community welfare, education, media management and micro-finance.

- Human Welfare Foundation (HWF)
- Association for Protection of Civil Rights
- Forum for Faith and Fraternity (3F Kochi)
- Centre for Information and Guidance India (CIGI)
- SAFI Institute of Advanced Study
- Madhyamam Daily
- Malarvadi Balasangam and Magazine
- Solidarity Youth Movement
- Baithuzzakath Kerala
- Alternative Investment and Credit Limited (AICL)
- Ethical Medical Forum (EMF)
- Dialogue Centre Kerala
- Ideal Relief Wing (IRW)

== Vision 2026 ==
Hassan's NGO activities towards community empowerment led to the extension of his project and it has been renamed as 'Vision 2026'. It is currently focusing on the sectors such as Education, Healthcare, Economic Development, Women Empowerment, Skill Development, Social Welfare, Community Development, Disaster Management, Micro-Finance and Civil rights Protection.

== Awards and honours ==
- Islam Online Star Award (2010)
- The First Ibrahim Sulaiman Sait Sahib Foundation Award (2015)
- Imam Haddad Excellence Award (2015) for outstanding work in the fields of education, public service, human rights struggle and Islamic movement for the upliftment of the Muslim minority in India.
- Kamala Surayya Award (Service Sector) (2017)
- A building was constructed in the name of Prof. Siddique Hassan at the University of Science and Technology, Meghalaya.

== Biographies ==
- “Siddique Hasan Sahib: Samarpitha Jeevithathinte Karmakandam” (Malayalam)[Siddique Hasan Sahib: Memoir of a life of Sacrifice] by T.P. Cheruppa, Kozhikode: Trend Books. 2021.
- “Visionary: Prof. K.A. Siddique Hassan Aksharasmriti” (Malayalam)[Visionary: A Memoir of Prof. K.A. Siddique Hassan], Kozhikode: Prabodhanam. 2021.
