= Shaikh Muhammad Karakunnu =

Kerala Jamaat-e-Islami

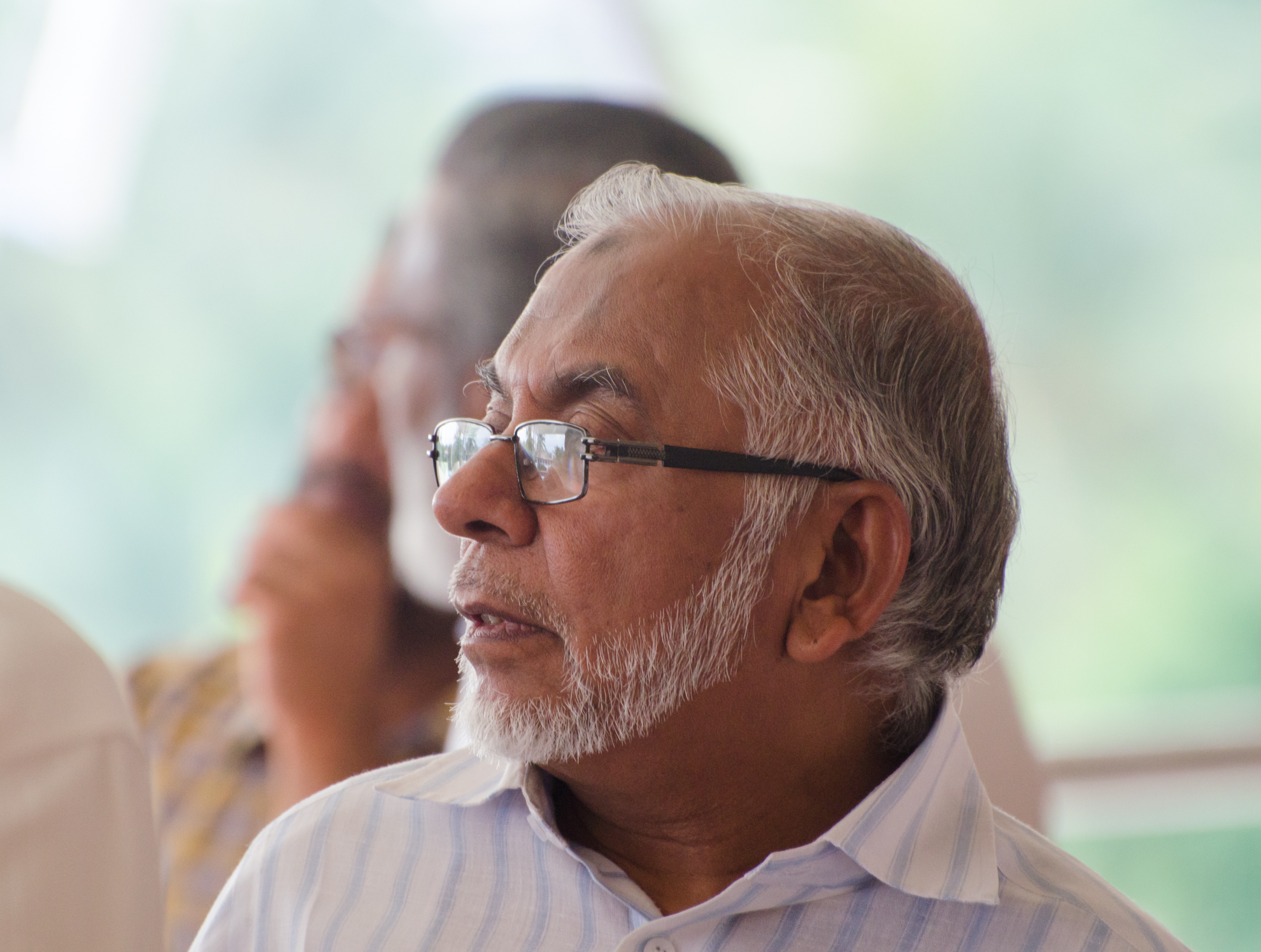
- Islami scholar and writer Sheikh Muhammed Karakkunnu speaking a programme at Garhoud, Dubai. 2012
- Born: 15 July 1950 (age 76)
- Occupations: State Secretary, Jamaat-e-Islami Hind Kerala chapter, Former Director of Islamic publishing house
- Movement: Jamaat-e-Islami Hind
- Spouse: Amina Ummu Aiman
- Children: Aneez Mohammed, Aleef Mohammed, Basima, Ayman Mohammed

Shaikh Muhammad Karakunnu is an Indian author, Islamic Scholar and State Secretary of Jamaat-e-Islami Hind Kerala chapter. He has authored more than Ninety books and has delivered numerous speeches on Islam, Muslim and Jamat-e-islami. He served as the director of the Kerala-based Islamic Publishing House.

== Biography ==
Shaik Mohammed Karakunnu was born to Mohammed Haji and Fatima on 15 July 1950 at Karakkunnu, a village near Manjeri in Malappuram district, in Kerala. He completed his education from Farooq Raudathul Uloom Arabic College, Kozhikode. After competing his studies from Roudhathul Uloom Arabic College, Feroke, Calicut he worked as a teacher for 10 years first at VHM High School Morayur and then at Islahiya Oriental High school Edavanna. He worked as a teacher in various government High schools. He served 25 years as the director of Islamic publishing house from 1982. Following which he took charge as the assistant ameer of Kerala JIH from 2007 to the present. He resumed his duties as director of Islamic publishing house from 2015 and continues to do so. He is also Prabhodanam chief editor from 2015. Later he took voluntary retirement and fully concentrated in writing and speeches for Islamic Dawah and propagation. He was executive member of Jamat-e-islami Hind and its Kerala chapter. He is married to Amina ummu aimen. Aneez Mohammed, Dr. Aleef Mohammed, Dr. Basima, Ayman Mohammed are their children.

== Author ==
He is the author of 80 books of which 14 are translations. He received awards for 5 books. Some of his books have been translated to English Tamil Kannada and Gujarati.

He participated in Inter faith dialogue Doha, IIFSO Asian Regional Training Committee and International Quranic Conference Dubai. He is an active participant in various stages of symposiums on Islam and inter-religious dialogue and debate. The widely accepted book, Quran Lalitha saram (simple meaning of Quran) is co-authored by Sheikh Mohammed and Vanidas Elayvoor. He received a number of awards in recognition of his works.

He also directed the project for releasing an electronic edition in Malayalam of Tafheemul Qur’an, the popular commentary of the Qur'an in six volumes by Abul Ala Maududi.

== Awards and other recognitions ==
He received the K Karunakaran award in March 2018 for his contribution to the society as an author. He also received the Sheikh Hamad award for translation and international understanding (Malayalam Translation- Award shared with N. Shamnad, V.A. Kabeer)

== Books ==
Shaikh Muhammad Karakunnu has written 80 books of which 14 are translations. He received awards for 5 books. Some of his books have been translated to English, Tamil, Kannada, and Gujarati.

- Quran Lalthasaram (Malayalam translation of the Quran)
- Abu hurairayum vimarshakarum (Abu Huraira and critics)
- Muhammed manushikathinte mahacharyan (Muhammed the mighty mentor of humanity)
- Haji Sahib
- islamika prasthanam: munnil nadannavar (Islamic movement - those who led the way)
- Vaivahika jeevitham Islamika veekshanathil(Married life in the eyes of Islam)
- Bahubaryathvam (Polygamy)
- Vivahamochanam (Divorce)
- Jamaat e Islami lakhuparichayam (Jamaat e Islami - an overview)
- Jamaat e Islamiyum vimarshakarum (Jamaat e Islami and its opponents)
- Anantharavakasha niyamangal Islamil (The laws of inheritance in Islam)
- Pravachakanmarude Prabodhanam (The Message of the Prophets)

=== Books translated to Tamil ===
- Islathil illarum (Married life in the eyes of Islam)

== See also ==
- Islamic publishing house
- Jamaat-e-Islami Hind
- Karakunnu, Nilambur
