= Abul Lais Islahi Nadvi =

Indian Islamic scholar (1913–1990)

President (Ameer) of Jamaat-e-Islami Hind
- In office 1948–1972
- Preceded by: Abul Ala Maududi
- Succeeded by: Maulana Mohammed Yusuf
- In office 1981–1990
- Succeeded by: Muhammad Sirajul Hassan

Personal details
- Born: 15 February 1913 Chandpatti, Azamgarh district, Uttar Pradesh, India
- Died: 5 December 1990 (aged 77) Azamgarh, Uttar Pradesh, India
- Children: Atiya Bano, Sajida Falahi
- Occupation: Islamic scholar, leader, journalist
- Known for: Founding president (Ameer) of Jamaat-e-Islami Hind

Maulana Abul Lais Islahi Nadvi (15 February 1913 – 5 December 1990) was an Indian Islamic scholar, leader, and journalist. He was the founding president (Ameer) of Jamaat-e-Islami Hind from 1948 to 1972 and from 1981 to 1990.
