= T.K. Ubaid =

Islamic writer and editor

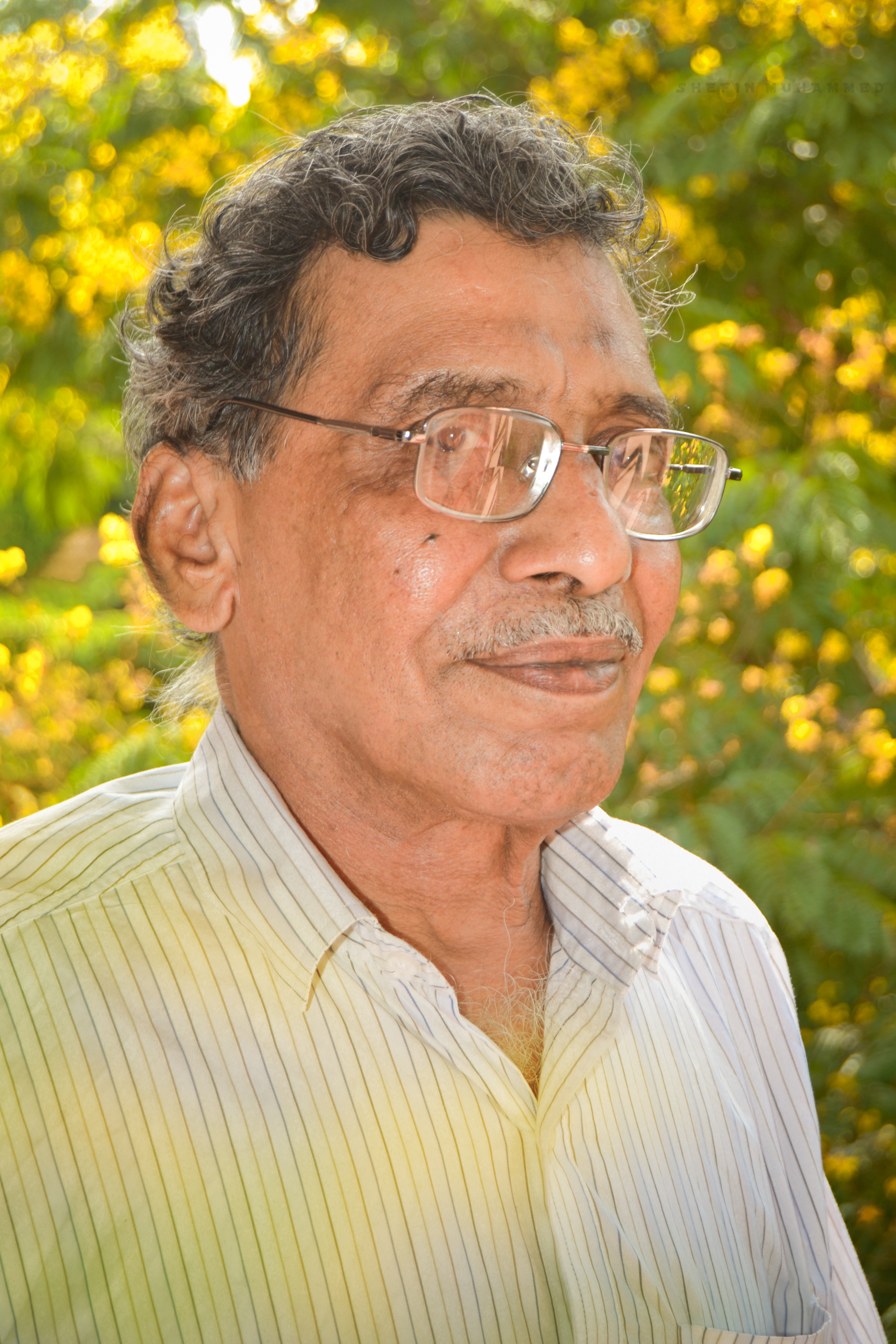
- Born: 5 July 1948; Malappuram, Kerala
- Occupations: Islamic Scholar and writer in Malayalam.

T.K. Ubaid is an Islamic writer and editor in Malayalam language. He has authored and translated books including Quran Bodhanam, a commentary to Quran. He is an editor of Islamic Encyclopedia project of Islamic publishing house, Kerala. He also contributed in translating 6 Volume Quran commentary Tafhim-ul-Quran to Malayalam language. As of July 2020, he is an editor of Prabodhanam weekly, and Malarwadi magazine.

== Early life ==
He was born in 1948 in the Thaiparambil Kalathil family at Kanjiramukku village in Ponnani Taluk, as the son of I.T.C. Muhammad Abdulla Nisami and Aisha Hajjumma. His paternal grandfather, Kokkur Abdullakkutty Musliyar, and his maternal grandfathers, Panayikkulam Puthiyappila Abdur Rahman Musliyar and Veliyankode Thattangara Kuttyyamu Musliyar, were well-known religious scholars in Kerala during their time. Completed his education from Islamiya College, Santhapuram near Perinthalmanna.

== Career ==
Uabaid started his career as sub editor of a kids magazine named Sanmargam from 1972 until he joined Prabodhanam in 1974. He became editor in-charge of Prabodhanam on 1977 and Executive editor in 1987. He also worked as Resident editor of Madhyamam Daily in the period of 1993-1994 at Kochi edition. From 1995, he also worked as a member of editorial board of journal, Bodhanam. For many years, he served as the editor of the Prabodhanam weekly and the Malarvaadi children magazine. He is now at his home in Kanjiramukku, engaged in completing the remaining volumes of his work on Quran, 'Quran Bodhanam'.

== Literary works ==
1. Quran bodhanam (8 Volumes released yet)
2. Adam Havva
3. Lokasundaran (Story of prophet Yusuf)
4. Burden of freedom (സ്വാതന്ത്ര്യത്തിന്റെ ഭാരം)
5. Prasnangngal veekshanangngal
6. Introduction to Islamic activism
7. Hadith bodhanam
8. Allah
9. Islamic Sharia and social changes (ഇസ്‌ലാമിക ശരീഅത്തും സാമൂഹ്യ മാറ്റങ്ങളും)
10. Manushya ninte manass

=== Translations ===
1. Tafhim-ul-Quran (6 Volumes-contribution with other translators)
2. Kalila and Dimna (കലീലയും ദിംനയും)
3. Four Basic Qur’anic Terms (ഖുർആനിലെ നാല് സാങ്കേതിക ശബ്ദങ്ങൾ)
4. The Meaning of the Qur'an (ഖുർആൻ ഭാഷ്യം)
5. Fiqhussunna
