= Syed Sadatullah Husaini =

Indian religious leader (born 1973)

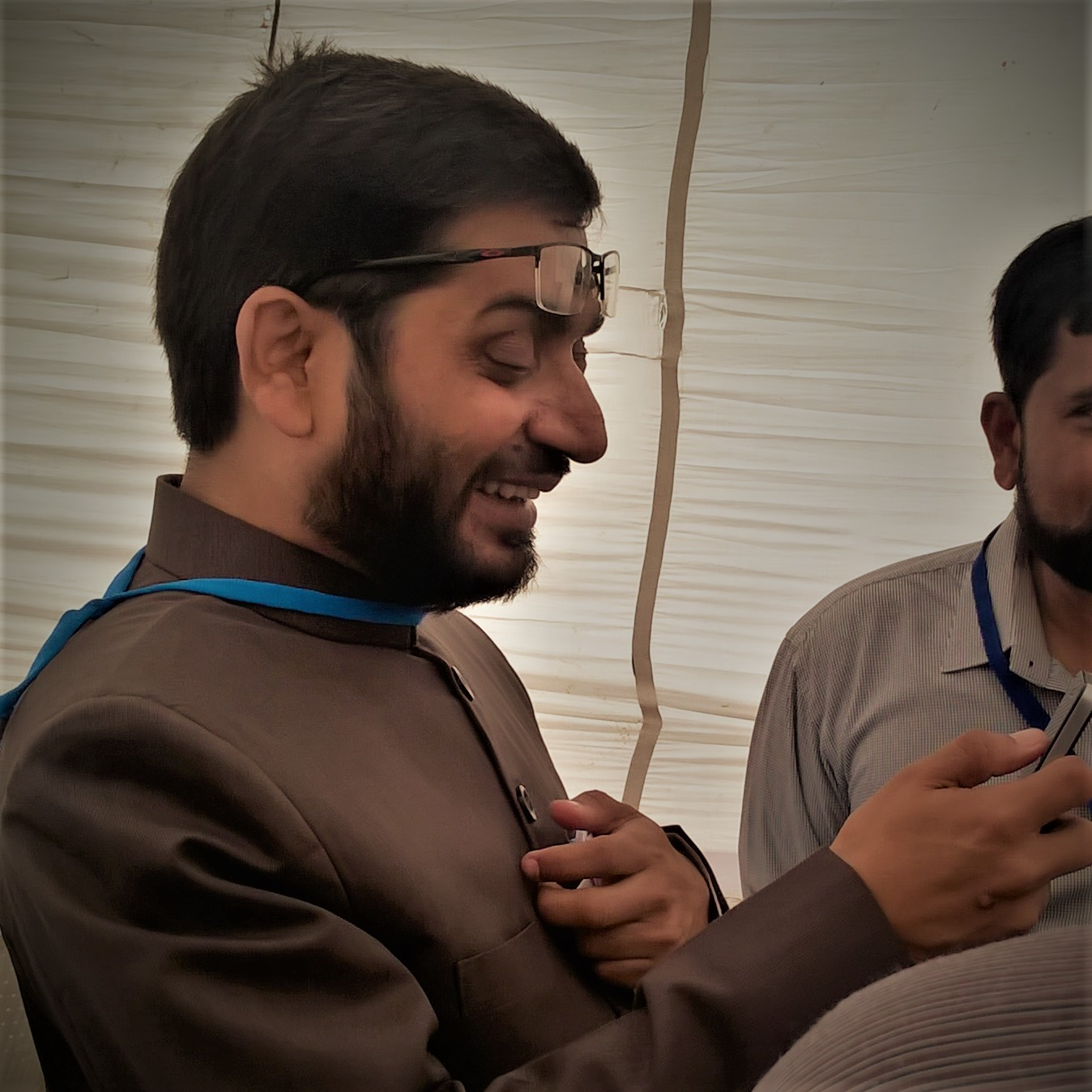
- Born: 7 June 1973 (age 51); Nanded, Maharashtra, India
- Main interests: Modernism; Postmodernism; Capitalism; Globalization; Islam

Syed Sadatullah Husaini (سید سعادت اللہ حسینی; born 7 June 1973) is the president (Amir) of Jamaat-e-Islami Hind (JIH) and Vice President of All India Muslim Personal Law Board (AIMPLB) based in Hyderabad. A former two-time National President of Students' Islamic Organisation of India, he has been heading the JIH's Study and Research Department as its director. He is a regular columnist in various magazines, journals, and newspapers writing on current issues and state of affairs.

== Biography ==
He was educated in the town of Nanded, Maharashtra, where he graduated in electronics and telecommunication engineering. As a student, he was associated with Students' Islamic Organisation of India and was its president for two consecutive terms (1999–2003).

When he joined the Markazi Majlis-e-Shura of Jamaat-e-Islami Hind, he was its youngest member. He was also on the boards of many social and academic organizations in Hyderabad, Bangalore, Delhi, and Aligarh.

== Views ==
=== Globalization and capitalism ===
Syed Sadatullah Husaini says that although Islam stands for globalization and universal brotherhood, modern globalization is a tool of exploitation that creates economic and social inequality. Globalization has resulted in the monopoly of Western cultural and ethical values and has undermined the political sovereignty of the national states.

=== Feminism and women ===
Syed Husaini is critical of both traditional Muslim societies and modern Western societies for their treatment of women. According to him, traditional Muslim societies have not given women their due place and rights as stipulated by Islam, while the modern West has snatched femininity and the very essence of womanhood from women in lieu of equality.

=== Muslim politics in India ===
Sadat argues that the right path for Muslims in a pluralistic society such as India is to engage in healthy dialogue with majority non-Muslim communities and contribute in a positive manner to nation-building. He has been critical of conspiracy theories and ghettoized politics. He has always urged fellow Muslims to develop positive mental attitudes and strengthen the communication channels with the majority community in India.

=== Postmodernism ===
In an exclusive paper, Syed has argued that postmodernism is a logically incorrect notion and it is an extreme reaction to modernism. According to him, the position of Islam that divinely revealed truths are absolute and all other truths are relative is a perfectly balanced notion that is free from the contradictions of postmodernism. He has supported the transmodernism notion of Ziauddin Sardar, and argued that Islam is a transmodern reality.

=== Right to Education Act ===
The Indian parliament has passed the Right to Education Act (RTE). It holds the government responsible for providing education to every citizen of the country. Criticizing the RTE act, Mr. Syed said that it has negated minorities' constitutional rights and that Muslims will not be able to run their religious educational institutions and madrasas.

== Books and articles ==
He has published the following books so far:

| Book Name | Publisher | Language |
|---|---|---|
| 1. Ikkeswin Sadi Meain Islam Musalman Aur Technology [Islam, Muslims and Technology in the 21st Century] | MMI Publishers, New Delhi | Urdu |
| 2. Sang Hai Mile [Milestones] | White Dot Publishers, New Delhi | Urdu |
| 3. Campus Guide | SIP Publications, New Delhi | Urdu |
| 4. Hindustani Muslamanon Ka Laih Amal [Strategy of Indian Muslims] | Unknown | Urdu |
| 5. Globalization and Muslim Youth | Islamic Foundation Trust, Chennai | Tamil |
| 6. Khwateen Meain Islami Tahreek [Islamic movement in women] | Hijab Publications, New Delhi | Urdu |
| 7. Ma Baad Jadeediyat Ka Challenge Aur Islam [Postmodernist Challenge and Islam] | MMI Publishers, New Delhi | Urdu |
| 8. Globalization Aur Sarmaya Darana Istemar [Globalization and Capitalistic Imperialism] | MMI Publishers, New Delhi | Urdu |
| 9. Sarmaya Darana Istemar Aur Khawateen [Capitalistic Imperialism and Women] | MMI Publishers, New Delhi | Urdu |
| 10. Iqamat e Deen Ki Shaherah [Road Map For Establishing Deen(Islam)] | Hidayat Publishers, New Delhi | Urdu |
| 11. Sarmaya Darana Istemar Aur Maliyati Istehsal [Capitalistic Imperialism and Economic Exploitation] | MMI Publishers, New Delhi | Urdu |
| 12. Istemar Ka Taraqqiyyati Model [Development Model of Imperialism] | MMI Publishers, New Delhi | Urdu |
| 13. Sarmaya Darana Istemar Aur Maholitai Bohran [Capitalistic Imperialism and Environmental Crisis](Jointly Authored) | MMI Publishers, New Delhi | Urdu |
| 14. Marunna Lokavum Islamika Chinthayum [Badalti hui duniya aur islami fikr] | Islamic Publishing House, Kerala | Malayalam |
| 15. Saibarstan, social media aur Muslim noujavan | | Urdu |
| 16. Hindustani Musalmano ki Tamkin o Taraqqi ba Haesiyat e Khaire Ummat | MMI Publishers, New Delhi | Urdu |

More than five of his books have been translated into Telugu, Kannada and Hindi. His interview has been published in the following book: "Muslim Leadership in India" - Global Media Publications, New Delhi.

He has published more than 200 articles in Urdu and English. His article "Cyberistan Ki Muaashirat" has been widely published and translated.

== See also ==
- Jamaat-e-Islami Hind
- Students Islamic Organisation of India
- All India Muslim Personal Law Board
- Jalaluddin Umri
- Malik Motasim Khan
