= Dreams Choked =

- Directed by: Muti ur Rahman, Abdul Mannan
- Produced by: Students Islamic Organisation of India, Telangana chapter
- Release date: 31 March 2017
- Running time: 30 minutes
- Country: India
- Language: Urdu/Telugu

Dreams Choked: Stories of our Government Schools is a 2017 documentary film produced by the Telangana chapter of the Students Islamic Organisation of India. The 30-minute documentary, directed by young college students Mutiur Rahman Dawoodi and Abdul Mannan, throws light on the condition of government-run schools in the state of Telangana.

The documentary involves a ground-level sample survey in one school in Adilabad district, two schools in Nizamabad, and two more in Karimnagar, and is a study of several other surveys and RTI petitions to get to the ground reality of the schools in the state.

The documentary was first premiered on 31 March 2017 at the Federation of Telangana and Andhra Pradesh Chambers of Commerce and Industry (FTAPCCI) auditorium in Hyderabad. Several academics and intellectuals including Prof. Suleman Siddiqui, Hamid Mohammed Khan, and Dr. Lubna Sarwath spoke at the premiere. The film's premiere was followed by several screenings in different parts of the state including Karimnagar, Warangal and Nizamabad.

== See also ==
- City of Pearls
