= Islamic Publishing House =

Islamic publisher of Kerala, India

- Parent company: Jama’at-e-Islami Hind Kerala chapter
- Status: Active
- Founded: 1945
- Country of origin: India
- Headquarters location: Vellimadukunnu, Calicut, Kerala, India.
- Publication types: Books
- Official website: IPH Kerala.com

Islamic Publishing House is a leading publisher of Islamic literature in the state of Kerala, India. It was founded in 1945 as the official publication division of Jama’at-e-Islami Hind, Kerala chapter. Its headquarters is in Kozhikode, Kerala.

== History ==
IPH began publishing in 1945 at a small mosque at Irimbiliyam, near Valanchery, Malappuram District.V. P. Muhammad Ali Haji (a.k.a. Haji Sahib) lead the initiative in its early stages. The office was later shifted from Irimbiliyam to Valanchery then to Edayoor and finally to Vellimadukunnu. Abul Jalal Moulavi, T. K. Ibrahim and T. Muhammed Sahib headed IPH at various times. Sheikh Muhammed Karakunnu has been the Director of IPH from 1982 till 2008. The current director is VK Ali.

A translation of Abul A’la Mawdudi's Towards Understanding Islam (Urdu:Risal-e-Diniyat) by V. P. Muhammad Ali Haji (a.k.a. Haji Sahib), titled 'Islam Matham' was the first book to be published by IPH. It also marked a significant shift of Islamic publications in Kerala from the hybrid Arabi-Malayalam script to the Malayalam script. It has since sold 67000 copies.

== Growth and development ==
IPH is the biggest publisher of Islamic literature in the whole of South India. Apart from Calicut, it has branches at Thiruvananthapuram, Ernakulam, Thrissur, Kannur, and Malappuram and agencies at more than 20 places in Kerala and the Middle East. It has published almost 500 books so far and many of them have sold more than 50,000 copies. Namaskaram(Prayer) written by Abul Jalal Moulavi alone sold 1,34,000 copies. All IPH publications follow the International Standard Book Number (ISBN) standard of book identification and are numbered with ISBN starting with 817204. Many of its publications have been published as e-books and are available for download at the Jamaat-e-Islami Hind, Kerala website. Lalithasaradsm, a Malayalam translation of the Qur'an, has also been published online.

In September 2008, IPH released the first electronic edition (DVD) in Malayalam of Tafheemul Qur’an, the commentary of the Quran by Abul Ala Maududi.

IPH has been a regular presence at international book fairs like the Sharjah Book Fair and the International Book Fair in Riyadh.

== Major works ==
Important books published by IPH include:

- Amritha Vani ( Nectarine Voice) - K. G. Raghavan Nair
- Bharatiya Samskarathinte Adiyozhukkukal ( Undercurrents of the Indian Civilization) - T. Muhammed
- Prabodhanam Qur’anil ( The Qur'anic Model of Propagation) - K.C. Abdullah Moulavi
- Ibadath: Oru Samagra Padanam ( Ibadah: A Comprehensive Study) - K.C. Abdullah Moulavi
- Vyvahika Jeevitham Islamika Veekshanathil ( Conjugal Life in the Islamic Perspective) - Sheikh Muhammed Karakunnu
- Qur’ante Munnil Vinayanwitham (Before the Qur'an, in Humility) - Vanidas Elayavoor
- Daivam, Matham, Vedam : Sneha Samvadam ( God, Religion, Scripture : A Dialogue of Love) - Sheikh Muhammed Karakunnu
- The Islamic Encyclopedia (Malayalam) - Various Authors
- Malabar Samaram: M. P. Narayana Menonum Sahapravarthakarum ( Malabar Struggle: M. P. Narayana Menon and Comrades) - Prof. M. P. S. Menon
- Rashtra Sankalpam Islamil (The Concept of State in Islam)
- Shariatum Indian Muslimkalum (Shariah and Indian Muslims) - V. A. Kabir
- Zakath: Tathvavum Prayogavum ( Zakath: Theory and Practice) - K. Abdulla Hasan
- Qur’an Lalita Saram (A Lucid Gist of Qur'an) - Sheikh Muhammed Karakunnu & Vanidas Elayavoor

=== Translations ===
- Tafhimul Qur’an - Abul Ala Maududi
- Qur’an Bhashyam (Tarjumanul Quran- An Interpretation on Qur'an) - Abul Ala Maududi
- Fiqh-Us-Sunnah - Syed Sabiq Fiqh-Us-Sunnah
- Islam: Prabodhanavum Pracharavum - Thomas Walker Arnold
- Muhammad: Mahanaya Pravachakan (Muhammad: The Great Prophet) - Prof. K.S. Ramakrishna Rao
- Islamika Samooham: Charitra Sangraham (Urdu:Millate Islamia Ki Mukhtsar Tareekh Eng:A Concise History of Islamic Society) - Sarvat Soulath
- Khilafathum Rajavaychayum (Urdu: Khilafath our Mulukiyaath-Caliphate and Kingship) - Abul Ala Maududi
- Islam Matham Towards Understanding Islam (Urdu:Risal-e-Diniyat) - Abul Ala Maududi
- Islam: Rajamargam (Eng:Islam between East and West) - Alija Izetbegović
- Islamile Samuhya Neeti (Social Justice in Islam ) - Sayyid Qutub
- Khutubat: Fundamentals of Islam - Abul Ala Maududi
- Qur’anile Janthukathakal (Arabic: Qasasul Hayavani fil Quran, Eng:Animal Stories in Qur'an) - Ahmad Bahjat
- Makkayilekkulla Patha (Eng: The Road to Mecca) - Muhammad Asad
- Malkam Exinte Athmakatha (Eng:The Auto Biography of Malcolm X) - Alex O' Haley
- Murad Hoffmante Diary Kurippukal (Eng:A Diary of a German Muslim - The Diary Notes of Murad Hoffmann ) - Murad Hoffmann.

== See also ==
- Jamaat-e-Islami Hind
- Prabodhanam
- Sheikh Muhammad Karakunnu
- T.K. Ubaid
