= Countercurrents.org =

India-based news and analysis website

- Website type: News, analysis and opinions
- Available in: English
- Owner: Binu Mathew
- Editor: Binu Mathew
- Website: countercurrents.org
- Commercial: Noncommercial
- Launched: 2002
- Current status: Active

Countercurrents.org is an India-based news, views and analysis website. It describes itself as non-partisan and taking "the Side of the People!" Countercurrents.org publishes news stories, editorials, and opinion pieces of authors from around the world. It has an international audience.

== History ==
Countercurrents.org was founded by journalist Binu Mathew, and published its first article on 27 March 2002. Countercurrents.org has published over 80,000 articles, fact-finding reports, research papers and news items on major social issues around the world. Countercurrents.org was awarded the 2018 Solidarity Media award by Solidarity Youth Movement in Kerala.

== Book and video production ==
Countercurrents has published three books in 2019. These are The Political Economy of Beef Ban, #MeToo – A Blow to Patriarchy and Connecting the Dots: An Anthology.

Countercurrents coproduced K. P. Sasi's documentary Voices from the Ruins: Kandhamal in Search of Justice on the pogrom against Christians in the Kandhamal district of Odisha.

== General references ==
- Towards A Counter Moveme Towards A Counter Movement!
- CounterCurrents.Org (India) : Who Benefits From Nuclear Power Plants In India ? CounterCurrents.Org (India) : Who Benefits From Nuclear Power Plants In India ?
