= Thottupoyil =

Thottupoyil is a small village in Malappuram district, Kerala, India.

Thottupoyil is 5 km (3.1 mi) north of Manjeri. The eastern part of Thottupoyil is under the Manjeri municipality, and the western part is under the Thrikkalangode grama Panchayath. There are continuous bus services to Thottupoyil from Manjeri city. There is a stream flowing towards the middle of the village from west to east.

The west of Thottupoyil is Koomankulam village, and the east is Cholakkal village. The southern boundary is a hill named "Kombilayi Mala", and the northern boundary has two villages, Cherankuth and Manhappatta. There is a Government LP School in the middle of the village. There are two main mosques in Thottupoyil;1: Thottupoyil old Juma masjid, 2: pottikkallu Juma masjid
