= Afreen Fatima =

Indian activist

- Born: 1998 or 1999
- Education: Jawaharlal Nehru University
- Occupation: Student leader
- Organization: Fraternity Movement
- Known for: Anti-CAA protests, activism for representation and identity assertion
- Title: National Secretary
- Political party: Fraternity Movement

Afreen Fatima (born 1998 or 1999) is an Indian student leader and National Secretary of Fraternity Movement. She is a prominent Muslim voice against the perceived anti-Muslim policies of the Indian government.

== Biography ==
She studied MA in linguistics at JNU, where she also served as the elected councillor in JNU students' union 2019-20 from the school of Language, Literature and Cultural Studies. As a candidate from Fraternity Movement - BAPSA alliance, she strengthened the call of "unity of the oppressed" and raised the issues of representation, discrimination and identity assertion. Formerly, she has been the elected president of Women's College Students' Union at the Aligarh Muslim University for the session 2018-19. She is known to have actively participated in the anti-CAA protests that started in 2019. She faced several days long media trial after a small part of her speech was tweeted by BJP's national spokesman Sambit Patra.

In June 2022 Afreen's house was demolished by the authorities in Prayag Raj after her father Jawed Muhammed, a leader of Welfare Party of India, was accused of taking part in protests against a controversial comment by Nupur Sharma about the prophet Muhammad.

She works as a researcher at The Polis Project, a research and journalism organization.
