= Jalaluddin Umri =

Indian Islamic scholar (1935–2022)

- Born: 1935; Puttagram, North Arcot, Madras Presidency, British India
- Died: 26 August 2022 (aged 87); Delhi, India
- Occupations: Religious scholar, political leader
- Organization: Jamaat-e-Islami Hind
- Known for: Former Top leader or Amir of Jamaat-e-Islami Hind (2007–2019); A follower of Abul A'la Maududi

Syed Jalaluddin Umri (1935 – 26 August 2022) was an Islamic scholar and writer. He was the Amir of Jamaat-e-Islami Hind from 2007 to 2019.

== Early life and education ==
Jalaluddin Umri was born in 1935 in a village called Puttagram, District of North Arcot, Tamil Nadu, British India. He was a graduate of Jamia Darussalam, Oomerabad, Tamil Nadu. He received a master's degree in Islamic studies from Jamia Darussalam. He also received a bachelor's degree in English literature from Aligarh Muslim University.

== Association with Jamaat-e-Islami Hind ==
Jalaluddin Umri began his association with Jamaat-e-Islami Hind during his student years. After completing his studies, he dedicated himself to its research department. He officially became its member in 1956. He served as the city Ameer of Jama'at of Aligarh for a decade, and the editor of its monthly Zindagi-e-Nau for five years. Later, the Jama'at elected him to its All-India deputy Ameer, which he served for four consecutive terms (sixteen years). In 2007, the Jama'at's Central Council of Representatives elected him its Ameer (Chief). He was again re-elected as Jama'at's Ameer in 2011.

Jalaluddin Umri was elected as Ameer, Jamaat-e-Islami Hind for the fourth term (April 2015 – March 2019).

In March 2019, Republic TV news channel had to issue an unconditional apology to Jalaluddin Umri for wrongly carrying his image during their broadcast of the news. This TV channel later announced that it had taken down its video related to Jalaluddin Umri from YouTube.

== Positions held ==
- Jamaat-e-Islami Hind – Chief leader or Amir from 2007 to 2019
- All India Muslim Personal Law Board – vice-president (2011 – 2019)
- Jamiatul Falah (rector of Jamiatul Falah organization, Azamgarh, Uttar Pradesh in 2011)
- Editor of Tahqiqat-e-Islami (a quarterly magazine) in 2011

== Academic Activities and Selected works ==
Jalaluddin Umri was widely considered, among the Islamic circles of India, an authority on human rights and Muslim family system.

Jalaluddin Umri had written many books in Urdu language, later translated in various languages:

- Maroof wa Munkar
- Islam ki Dawat
- Musalman Aurat ke Huquuq aur Un par aeterazaat ka Jaiza (Rights of Muslim Women - A Critique of the Objections)
- SeHat-o-marz aur Islam ki Taleemat
- Islam meN khidmat-e-khalq ka Tasawwur (Social Service in Islam)
- Inabat Ilallah
- Sabeele Rab
- Islam Aur Manav Adhikkar
- State of Our Community and Nation and Our Responsibilities

== Personal life and death ==
Jalaluddin Umri died at a private hospital in Delhi on 26 August 2022, at the age of 87.

== See also ==
- Jamaat-e-Islami Hind
- Abul A'la Maududi
- Students Islamic Organisation of India
- Succeeded by Syed sadatullah Husaini.

Party political offices
Preceded by Abdul Haq Ansari	Ameer of Jamaat-e-Islami Hind; 2007–2019	Succeeded by Syed Sadatullah Husaini
