= Girls Islamic Organisation =

Student organization in India (1982)

Girls Islamic Organisation of India; گرلس اسلامک آرگنائزیشن آف انڈیا
- Formation: 5 March 1984; 42 years ago
- Type: Student Organisation
- Legal status: Active
- Headquarters: Abul Fazal Enclave Part 1, Part 1 Abul Fazal Enclave, Block E, Jamia Nagar, Okhla, New Delhi, Delhi 110025
- National President: Adv Sumaiya Roshan
- Parent organisation: Jamaat-e-Islami Hind
- Affiliations: Jamaat-e-Islami Hind (de facto)

Girls Islamic Organisation or GIO is a student organisation in India for Muslim girls. It came to existence under the patronage of state committees of Jamaat-e-Islami Hind as the female students' wing.

GIO actively works in a number of Indian states including Rajasthan, West Bengal, Andhra Pradesh, Telangana, Maharashtra, Kerala, Delhi, Gujarat and Karnataka.

== History ==
Since 1984, GIO has functioned as a part of the female wing of Jamaat-e-Islami in Kerala. Later, it was spread to create state committees in various states of India.

In 2007, it started working in state of Andhrapradesh and Telangana.

It later added Goa, Delhi, Maharashtra, Gujarat, and Karnataka.

The GIO claimed that it is working in female students and young women for self empowerment, against discrimination on basis of religion, culture and caste. GIO also claims that all their activities are on to the grounds of Islam. GIO conducts camps, campaigns and contests for their age group.

GIO regularly conducts study classes, and public meetings for girls. It organizes occasional campaigns for female students and young women. GIO participating or conducting the protests in women related issues.

== See also ==
- Students Islamic Organisation of India
- Jamaat-e-Islami Hind
