= Solidarity Youth Movement =

Islamic political organization based in Kerala, India

Solidarity Youth Movement Kerala
- Formation: May 13, 2003; 23 years ago
- Headquarters: Hira Centre, Kozhikode, Kerala
- President: Thoufeekh Mampad
- President: T Ismayil
- General Secretary: Thoufeekh Mampad
- Parent organisation: Jamaat-e-Islami Hind
- Website: solidarityym.org

Solidarity Youth Movement Kerala is the youth wing of the Islamic organisation Jamaat-e-Islami Hind in the state of Kerala in India. The movement's stated objective is to "liberate the generation of youths from moral bankruptcy and debauchery and to transform them into a radical vanguard fighting for the betterment of society". It, along with its parent organisation Jamaat-e-Islami Hind, has shared common ground with India's left-wing parties on issues related to Indo-US relations and globalisation. The organisation has brought to mainstream the issues concerned with the marginalized communities. Solidarity Youth Movement have also initiated legal battles against controversial legislations like NIA.

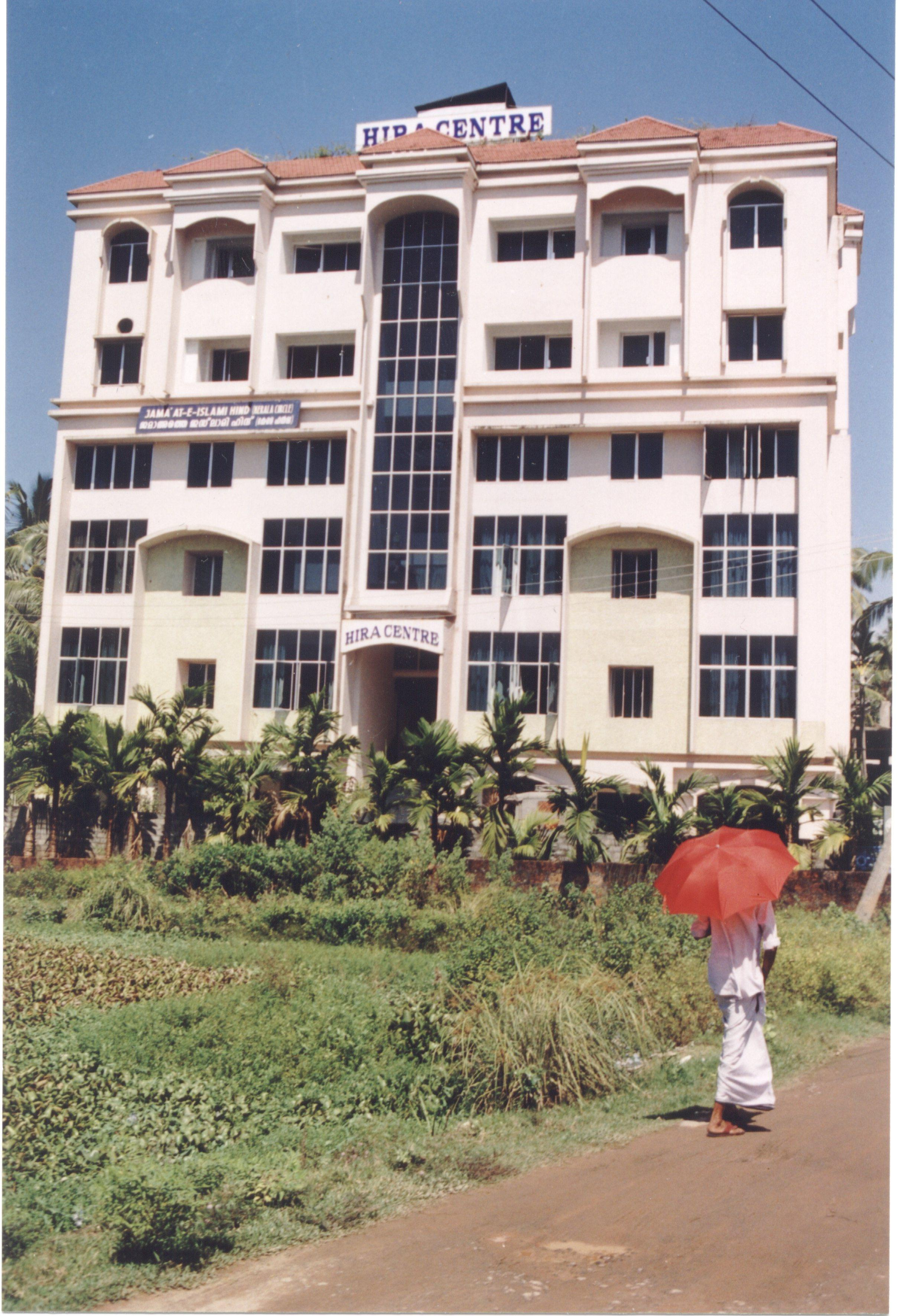
Hira center, Calicut.

== History ==
The Students Islamic Organisation of India is the youth and student wing of the Jamaat-e-Islami Hind all across India. In 2002, the Kerala chapter of the organisation decided to transform SIO into a completely student organisation in Kerala and launch a new wing for the youth. Solidarity Youth Movement, Kerala was thus formed on 13 May 2003 at Muthalakulam Grounds, Calicut. Dr Koottil Mohammed Ali was elected as its first state president and Hameed Vaniyambalam its General Secretary. It held its first state conference at Palakkad on 23 April 2005. The organisational structure today includes 14 district committees, 110 area committees and more than 1000 individual units across the state of Kerala.

== Activities ==
International Islamophobia Conference

Solidarity Youth Movement Kerala organizes International Islamophobia Conference Kerala, which will be held on 16–18 December 2016 at Kozhikode in Kerala, India.

Malabar Nivarthana Prakshobham
New Kerala Development Forum (2011)

Solidarity organized New Kerala Development Forum to discuss development issues of Kerala in March 2011

Agitations

The movement played an influential role in bringing into public attention the grassroots struggle against the Coca-Cola factory at Plachimada, Palakkad and campaigned to boycott Coca-Cola in areas where it commands considerable influence. It led the agitation against a proposed Express Highway by the Kerala Government and views privatisation of roads as a "system which denies it for the underprivileged by levying tolls on the roads ". It also opposes the Build-Operate-Transfer (BOT) system of road development, and recommends an "all inclusive development of railway and waterway supported by good roads" as the solution for developing the transportation infrastructure of Kerala. Solidarity also lent support to tribal struggles for land reforms to distribute land to the adivasi groups at Chengara, Mukkaal Cent Colony in Kollam district, and Elamkulam colony. It played role in bringing these issues into the attention of the general public and the government of Kerala. It also vehemently opposes the corporatisation of retail sector, fearing that it would seriously impact farmers, traders and the cultural basis of the society.

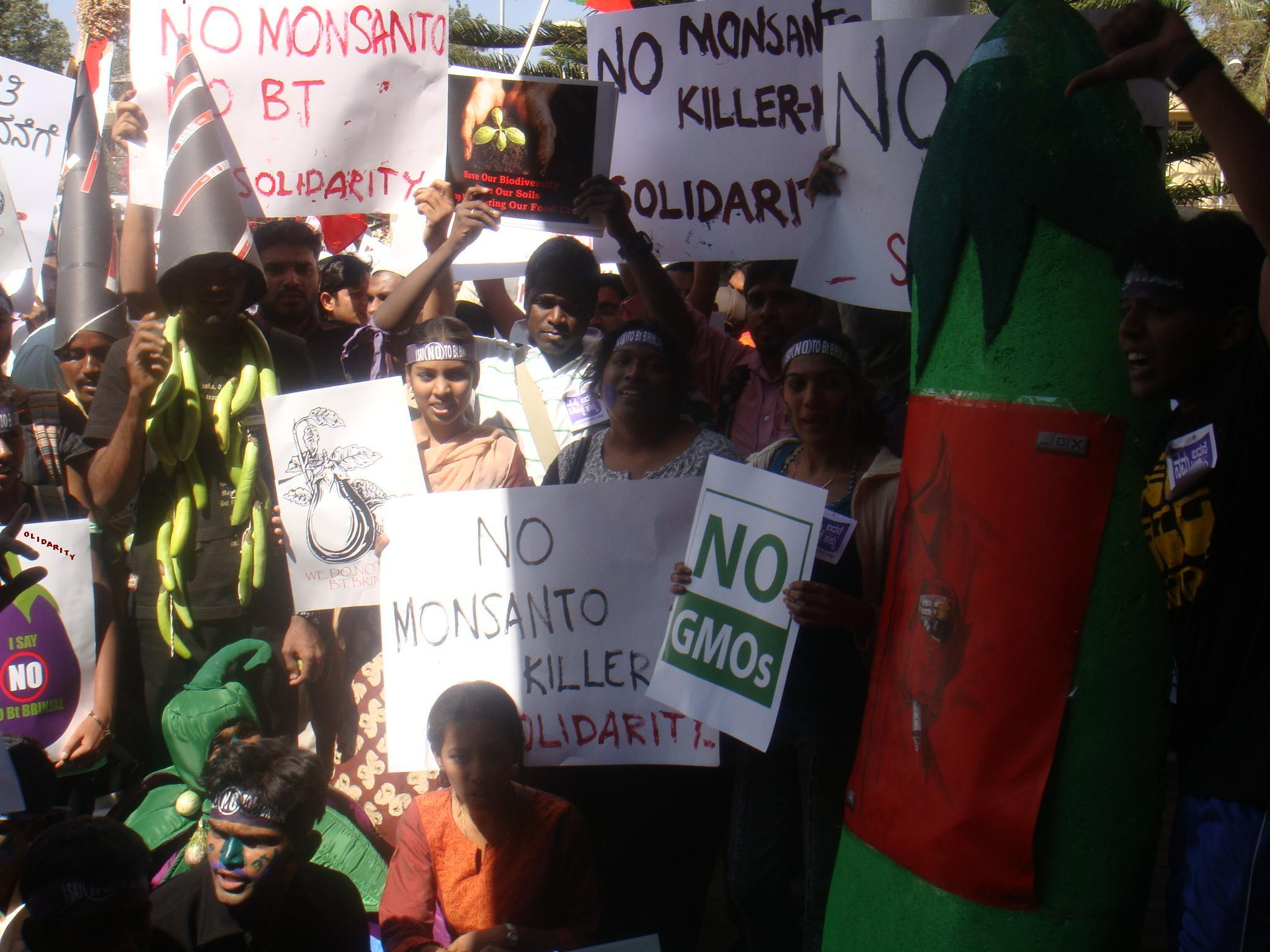
Protest against BT Brinjal and a call for GM Free Food (Genetically Modified) by Solidarity and Greenpeace

Large scale projects

Solidarity involves itself in humanitarian services, mostly in tribal and backward regions of Kerala. The organisation completed a Rs 5,000,000 project for relief efforts to the victims of the harmful pesticide Endosulphan in villages in Kasargode district, north Kerala. A total of 17 new houses were built and another 17 were repaired as part of the project. More than 100 patients were given regular treatment and 244 families were provided daily food ration. 100 students were given educational aid 10 families were supported with employment schemes.

Solidarity has also constructed around 500 houses for the poor across Kerala and recently launched an initiative to provide drinking water to 50 villages in Kerala.

Noted social activists as C. Radhakrishnan, Medha Patkar, Ajit Sahi, Arundhati Roy, Sandeep Pandey, Ram Puniyani, Yvonne Ridley, Claude Alvares and Kuldip Nayar have addressed its gatherings.

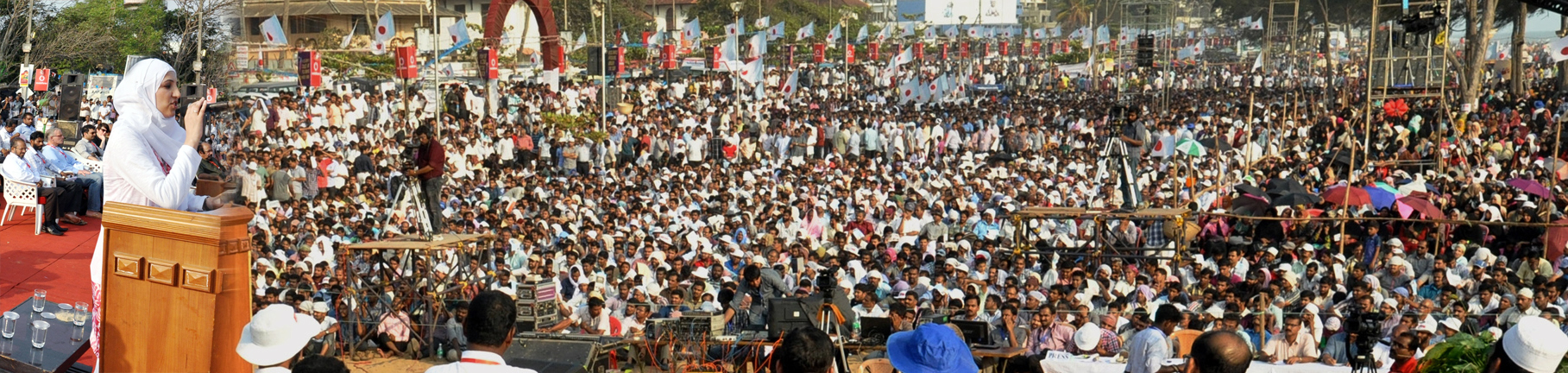
Salma Yaqoob in Solidarity Conference on tenth age celebration at Calicut 19 May 2013

== Leadership ==
S.No	Period	President	General Secretary
1	( 2003–2005 )	Dr Koottil Mohammed Ali	Abdul Hameed Vaniambalam
2	( 2005–2007 )	Abdul Hameed Vaniambalam	Mujeeb Rahman P
3	( 2007–2009 )	Mujeeb Rahman P	K A Shafeeque
4	( 2009–2011 )	Mujeeb Rahman P	M Sajid(09–10), P.I.Noushad(10– 11)
5	( 2011–2013 )	P.I. Noushad	T. Muhammed Velom
6	( 2013 – 2015 )	T. Muhammed Velom	Kalathil Farooq
6	( 2015– 2017 )	T. Shakir Velom	Sadiq Uliyil
7	(2017–2019)	P.M. Salih	Umer Alathur
8	(2019–2020)	Dr.Nahas Mala	Umer Alathur
9	(2021–2022)	Dr.Nahas Mala	Jumail P P
10	(2023–2024)	Suhaib C.T	Thoufeekh Mampad
11	(2025–2026)	Thoufeekh Mampad	T Ismayil

== See also ==
- Islamic Publishing House
- Madhyamam Daily
- Prabodhanam
- Students Islamic Organisation of India
