= K. C. Abdullah Moulavi =

K.C. Abdullah Maulavi
- Born: 22 February 1920
- Died: 13 August 1995 (aged 75)
- Occupations: Leader of Jamate Islami Kerala, for 22 years.
- Spouse: Umayya
- Parent(s): Husain Musliyar, Atiyya

Abdullah Moulavi was an Islamic scholar and leader of Jamate Islami in Kerala. He was known as the leader of Jamaat-e-Islami and Muslim educationist. After the demise of Haji Sahib, Abdullah Moulavi was the leader of Jamaat-e-Islami Kerala for 22 years between 1959 and 1990.

== Early life ==
K.C. Abdulla Moulavi was born on 22 February 1920 in Kodiyathur in Kozhikode District. Kunnathuchalil Hussain Musliyar and Atiyya were the parents. After completing his native schooling till the fifth grade, he completed his preliminary studies in Pallidars and studied in the dars of Poonur and Peringadi and in the Vellore Baqiyathussalihat. In 1943, the M.F.B. Graduated from Vellore. Later, KC returned home. At the invitation of MCC Abdurrahman Moulavi, Principal of Vazhakkad Darul Uloom and Samastha Kerala Jamiyyathul Ulama, he became a teacher there. When the college was shifted to Tirurangadi, KC moved there. In the meantime, he received his Bachelor of Arts degree from the University of Madras. From 1946 to 1949, he served as a lecturer at Kasargod Aliya (now Alia Arabic College).

== Leadership ==
In July 1947, he left the Kerala Jamiyyathul Ulama and became an activist. He became a member of the Jamaat-e-Islami Kerala in January 1948. In August of the same year, he was elected to the State Consultative Committee. He served as the Chief of Jamaat-e-Islami Kerala for 22 years from 1959 to 1972, 1979-1982 and 1984–1990.

In 1949, when the beginning of publishing the Prabodhanam magazine, he left Aaliyah and went on to become Editor in charge. He was member of the All India Consultative Committee (Majlis Shura) and the House of Representatives (Majlis NumaIntagan) from 1950 until his death.

KC, who was arrested during the Indo-Pak War of 1965 and the movement's banning during the Emergency of 1975. He was instrumental in the formation of the State Branch of the Students Islamic Organization in Kerala.

It was under the patronage of the KC that for the first time in Kerala, Islamic Movement for Women was initiated by the Girls Islamic Organization, on the lines of the SIO.

== Works ==
KC had common knowledge in English and Arabic and was fluent in Arabic and Urdu. He has authored several papers and over a dozen books in Malayalam:

- Allah in Quran (അല്ലാഹു ഖുർആനിൽ)
- The Hereafter in the Qur'an (പരലോകം ഖുർആനിൽ)
- Ibadat, a comprehensive study (ഇബാദത്ത് ഒരു സമഗ്രപഠനം).
- The spirit of prayer (നമസ്കാരത്തിന്റെ ചൈതന്യം)
- The spirit of fasting (നോമ്പിന്റെ ചൈതന്യം)
- An introduction to preaching (പ്രബോധനം ഒരു മുഖവുര)
- Jinns and angels (ജിന്നുകളും മലക്കുകളും)
- The roots of Qadianism (ഖാദിയാനിസത്തിന്റെ അടിവേരുകൾ)
- Preaching in Qur'an (പ്രബോധനം ഖുർആനിൽ)
- Importance of preaching (പ്രബോധനത്തിന്റെ പ്രാധാന്യം)
