= Fraternity Movement =

Student-youth party in India

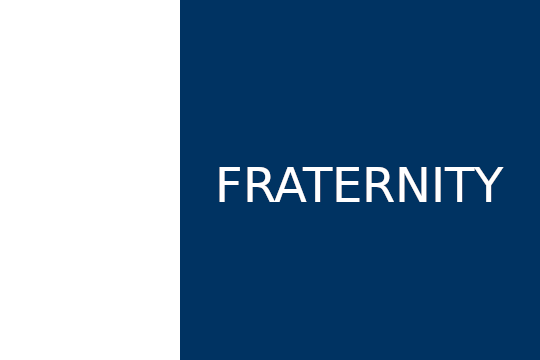
- Formation: April 30, 2017; 9 years ago
- Headquarters: New Delhi
- Fields: Student and Youth
- General Secretary: Afreen Fatima
- President: Ramees Ek
- Website: fraternityindia.org

The Fraternity Movement is the student wing of Welfare Party of India. The slogan of the movement is "Democracy, Social Justice and Fraternity".

== History ==
In 2017, Fraternity made its foray into politics by winning a seat in the college students council of the Maharaja's College in Ernakulam. Fraternity Movement candidate Afreen Fatima won the student union elections of Jawaharlal Nehru University as a councillor in 2019.

During the Citizenship Amendment Act protests, Fraternity Movement blocked the airport road in Karipur in protest. This affected hundreds of passengers who commuted to and from the Kozhikode International Airport.

Fraternity Movement was launched on 30 April 2017 at a student-youth convention held at Ambedkar Bhawan, New Delhi. Aligarh Muslim University Student Leader Ansar Aboobaker was elected as the first president. Since its formation, the organisation has grown in many states including Kerala, West Bengal, Tamil Nadu, Rajasthan, Uttar Pradesh and Karnataka. Following the court verdict of Babri Masjid - Ram Janmbhoomi dispute, Fraternity Movement criticised the judgement stating Supreme Court has failed to uphold justice.

== Prominent leaders ==
=== Afreen Fatima ===
Afreen Fatima is a student leader and National Secretary of Fraternity Movement. She is a prominent Muslim voice against the anti-Muslim policies of the Indian government. She studied MA in linguistics at JNU, where she also served as the elected councillor in JNU students' union 2019-20 from the school of Language, Literature and Cultural Studies. As a candidate from Fraternity Movement - BAPSA alliance, she strengthened the call of "unity of the oppressed" and raised the issues of representation, discrimination and identity assertion. Formerly, she has been the elected president of Women's College Students' Union at the Aligarh Muslim University for the session 2018-19. She is known to have actively participated in the anti-CAA protests that started in 2019. She faced several days long media trial after a small part of her speech was tweeted by BJP's national spokesman Sambit Patra.

=== Aysha Renna ===
Aysha Renna is a Muslim Student Activist and National Secretary of Fraternity Movement. A Post Graduate in History from Jamia Millia Islamia, she is one of the leading voices of the Citizenship Amendment Act Protests. She along with Ladeeda Farzana were called 'Sheroes of Jamia' by Barkha Dutt in an interview. Her video of confronting baton wielding police officers to save her friend during a protest went viral. She has travelled to all major Indian cities to address the Shaheen Bagh protest sites against Citizenship Amendment Act passed by the Indian government in 2019. In January 2021, she was invited to speak at the Elgar Parishad along with Arundhati Roy, Kannan Gopinathan and Sharjeel Usmani.

== Campus units ==
- Jawaharlal Nehru University
- English and Foreign Languages University
- University of Hyderabad
- University of Calicut
- University of Delhi
- Pondicherry University
