= Abdul Haq Ansari =

Islamic philosopher (1931–2012)

President of Jamaat-e-Islami Hind
- In office 2003–2007
- Preceded by: Muhammad Sirajul Hassan
- Succeeded by: Jalaluddin Umri

Personal details
- Born: Muhammad Abdul Haq Ansari; 9 January 1931 Tamkuhi Raj, Kushinagar, Uttar Pradesh, India
- Died: 3 October 2012 (aged 81) Aligarh, Uttar Pradesh, India
- Education: Aligarh Muslim University; Harvard University
- Occupation: Islamic scholar, Philosopher
- Known for: Sufism and Shariah, Learning the Language of Quran

Muhammad Abdul Haq Ansari (1 September 1931 – 3 October 2012) was an Islamic scholar from India. He was the Amir (president) of Jamaat-e-Islami Hind (JIH) from 2003 to 2007. He was the member of Central Advisory Council of Jamaat-e-Islami Hind. He was also the Chancellor of Al Jamia Al Islamia, Shantapuram, Kerala. His book Sufism and Shariah is a synthesis of Sufi and Shariah thought, especially a Tatbiq (application, coherence, synthesis) of Shaikh Ahmed Sir Hindi and Shah Waliullah's thought. It grew out of his in-depth engagement with kalam, tasawwuf and fiqh in Islamic history. His other major contributions are a book on Mishkawah's philosophy and an English translation of Ibn Taymiyyah's fatwas with an introduction. He also wrote 'Learning the Language of Quran' it is one of the best English guides for the beginners learning to read the Qur'an. In New Delhi he established the Islami Academy, aimed at training graduates from secular educational background in Islamic Sciences based on the madrasa curriculum.

== Education ==
After completing Alimiyat from Darsgah Islami, Rampur, Abdul Haq Ansari came to Aligarh where he studied Arabic, Philosophy and history and obtained his B.A from Aligarh Muslim University, in 1957. He pursued higher studies in philosophy and obtained M.A (Philosophy) from Aligarh Muslim University in 1959. He did his PhD (Philosophy) from Aligarh Muslim University in 1962. He also obtained a master's degree, M.T.S.(Comparative Religion and Theology), from Harvard University U.S.in 1972.

== Academic activities ==
Ansari served as Professor and Head of the Department of Arabic, Persian and Islamic Studies at the Vishwa Bharti University (1965-1978). He also taught Islamic Studies at Sudan University (1978-1981), Dhahran University (1982-1985), and at Imam Muhammad Bin Saud University, Riyadh (1985-1995).

He has read many papers in International and National conferences. Some of them are:

- Orientalist Conference, New Delhi, January 1964, paper read : The Concept of Ultimate Happiness in Muslim Philosophy Compared with Buddhist Nirvana.
- International Fifth East-West Philosophers Conference, Honolulu, Hawaii, 1969, Presided over a week-long Sectional meeting, and read paper on Alienation of Modern Man and Islam.
- International Religious Conference, Patiala University, 1969, paper read : Guru Nanak's View of God.
- Participated in the International Seminar on Morality and Law, New Delhi, 1973.
- World Conference on Religions and Peace, Brussels, 1974.
- International Islamic Education Conference, King Abdul-Aziz University, Jeddah, 1977, read paper : Transformation of the Perspective.
- Islamic Studies Conference, Aligarh, 1962, paper read: The Ethics of Ibn Sina.
- Oriental Studies Conference, Gauhati, 1965, paper read : The Good and the Right in the Mutazilite Theology.
- Seminar on Religion, Bhagalpur University, 1969, paper read: Integration of Indian Society and Islam (Urdu: Qowmi Ekjihati Aur Islam).
- Sahitya Academy Seminar, New Delhi, 1969, paper read: Some Observations on Guru Nanak.
- Philosophy Conference, Madras University, 1969, paper read: Liberation and Islam.
- Seminar on Philosophy of Religion, Visva Bharati, Santiniketan, 1974, paper read: Myth, Truth and the Qur'an.
- Sahitya Academy Seminar, New Delhi, 1975, paper read: Shaykh Farid Ganj Shakar: An Ideal Sufi.
- Seminar on Islamic Thought, Jamia Millia, New Delhi, 1976, paper read: A critical Review of Islamic Theology Urdu: Ilm Kalam Ka Tanqidi Jaizah.
- Seminar on Islam in a changing World, Aligarh Muslim University, 1977 paper read: Islamic Values and Change.

== Research and works ==
- The Ethical Philosophy of Miskawaih, Aligarh Muslim University Press, Aligarh, India, 1964.
- The Moral Philosophy of al-Farabi, Aligarh, India, 1965.
- The Islamic Ideal (in Urdu: Maqsad Zindagi Ka Islami Tasawwar), Maktaba Islami, Delhi, India, 1970
- Sufism and Shariah: A Study of Shaykh Ahmad Sirhindi's Effort to Reform Sufism, The Islamic Foundation, Leicester, U.K. 1985
- An Introduction to the Exegesis of the Quran, (English translation of Ibn Taymiyah's Muqaddamat al-Tafsir with introduction and notes), Imam Muhammad bin Saud Islamic University, Riyadh, Saudi Arabia, 1989.
- Learning the Language of the Quran, Centre for Religious Studies and Guidance, Aligarh, India, 1997.
- Ibn Taymiyah Expounds on Islam, Islamic University, Riyadh, Saudi Arabia, and Institute of Islamic and Arabic Sciences in America, Washington, U.S.A., 2000.
- Commentary on the Creed of Al-Tahawi, transl. with an Introduction of Ibn Abi l-'Izz's Sharh al-'Aqidah al-Tahawiyah, Institute of Islamic and Arabic Sciences, Washington, U.S.A., 2000.
- Tasawwuf aur Shariah: Shaykh Mujaddid Ke Fikr Ka Mutali’ah, Urdu trans. of my Sufism and Shariah, with a new Introduction, Maktaba Islami, New Delhi, 2001.
- Serving God (translation of the Risalah al-Ududiyah of Ibn Taymiyah).
- Sufi Perspectives on Experience and Reality: An Exercise in Understanding Sufism
- Mujaddid Deen-e-Ummat aur Tasawwuf, MMI Publishers, New Delhi, 2008.

== Death ==
He died at home in Aligarh on 3 October 2012, following a brief cardiac failure. He was 82.

== See also ==
- Jamaat-e-Islami Hind
- Maulana Maududi

Party political offices
| Preceded by Siraj ul Hasan | Ameer of Jamaat-e-Islami Hind; 2003 – 2007 | Succeeded by Jalaluddin Umri |
