= Karakunnu, Nilambur =

Karakunnu Muppathi Randu 32
- village
- Location in Kerala, India Karakunnu (India)
- Coordinates: 11.18010°N 76.12114°E
- Country: India
- State: Kerala
- District: Malappuram

Government
  - Type: Panchayati raj (India)
  - Body: Gram panchayat

Population (2011)
  - Total: 16,525

Languages
  - Official: Malayalam, English
- Time zone: UTC+5:30 (IST)
- PIN: 676123
- Vehicle registration: KL-10

Karakunnu is a village in Thrikkalangode Panchayath Malappuram district in the state of Kerala, India.

== Demographics ==
At the 2011 India census, Karakunnu had a population of 16,525 with 8,049 males and 8,476 females.

== Notable people ==
- Muhammad (Karakunnu), writer, born 1950 in Karakunnu
