= Muhammad Sirajul Hassan =

Indian Islamic scholar (1933–2020)

President of Jamaat-e-Islami Hind
- In office 1990–2003
- Preceded by: Maulana Mohammed Yusuf
- Succeeded by: Abdul Haq Ansari

Personal details
- Born: 1933 Raichur, Karnataka, India
- Died: 2 April 2020 (aged 86–87) Raichur, Karnataka, India
- Occupation: Zonal Chief of Karnataka, Secretary of Jamaat in Delhi

Muhammad Sirajul Hassan (1933 – 2 April 2020) was an Indian Islamic scholar and leader who served as the President of Jamaat-e-Islami Hind (JIH) from 1990 to 2003.

Party political offices
Preceded by Maulana Mohammed Yusuf	Ameer of Jamaat-e-Islami Hind; 1990 – 2003	Succeeded by Abdul Haq Ansari
