= Islamia Park =

Residential neighborhood in Lahore, Pakistan

Islamia Park اسلامیہ پارک
- Neighbourhood
- Country: Pakistan
- Province: Punjab
- City: Lahore
- Tehsil: Lahore City
- Union council: 13 (Islamia Park)

Islamia Park (Punjabi, Urdu: اسلامیہ پارک) is a residential neighbourhood located in Lahore City Tehsil of the city of Lahore in Punjab, Pakistan. This neighbourhood is located near Chauburji in the city of Lahore.
