= Oomerabad =

- Village
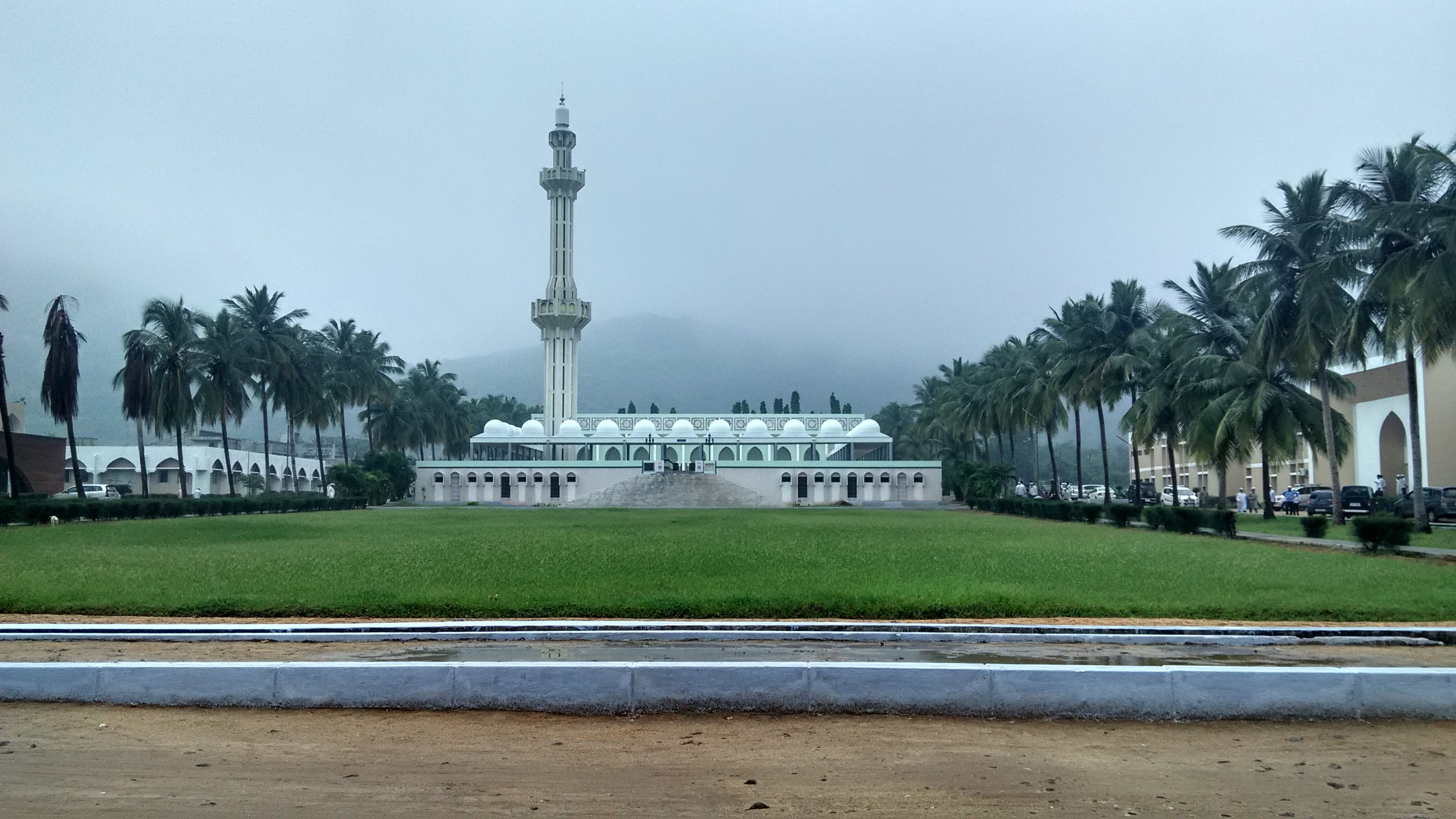
- Sultan Mosque located in Jamia Darussalam College campus
- Nicknames: Umarabad, Umarabath
- Location in Tamil Nadu, India Oomerabad (India)
- Coordinates: 12°50′29″N 78°42′25″E
- Country: India
- State: Tamil Nadu
- District: Tirupathur district
- Founder: Kaka Mohammed Oomer

Government
  - Type: Village Panchayat

Area
  - Total: 2.52 km^{2} (0.97 sq mi)
- Elevation: 189 m (620 ft)

Population (2016)
  - Total: 21,897
  - Density: 8,690/km^{2} (22,500/sq mi)

Languages
  - spoken: Tamil, Urdu
- Time zone: UTC+5:30 (IST)
- PIN: 635808
- Telephone code: +91; 04174 & 04171
- Vehicle registration: TN-83
- Official Language: Tamil

Oomerabad or Umarabad is a village in Tirupathur district, Tamil Nadu, India. It is part of Ambur Taluk.

The name Oomerabad refers to its founder Kaka Mohammed Oomer, and the word Abad which means "inhabited".

== Geography ==
Oomerabad is located in 12°50′29″N 78°42′25″E. The major population comprises people following Islam and Hinduism

== Transportation ==
Oomerabad is at a distance of 8 km by road from the leather hub Ambur. It is well connected by State highways. The nearest railway station is in Ambur. The nearest international airports are Chennai International Airport (190 km) and Bengaluru International Airport (180 km) and Vellore airport (49.1 km)

== Hospital ==
The village also has a hospital run by the Management of Jamia Darussalam called Jamia Darussalam Hospital. The hospital has laboratory, maternity facilities and out-patient services. Besides serving Oomerabad people, it also serves the surrounding villages and towns including Ambur, Gudiyattam, Vaniyambadi and Pernambut.

== Education ==
Jamia Darussalam is an Islamic college in the town.

== Weather ==
Climate data for Oomerabad (2000–2012)
Month	Jan	Feb	Mar	Apr	May	Jun	Jul	Aug	Sep	Oct	Nov	Dec	Year
Record high °C (°F)	35.3 (95.5)	39.8 (103.6)	42.8 (109.0)	44.4 (111.9)	45.0 (113.0)	44.3 (111.7)	40.9 (105.6)	39.4 (102.9)	39.6 (103.3)	39.2 (102.6)	35.8 (96.4)	35.0 (95.0)	45.0 (113.0)
Mean daily maximum °C (°F)	29.2 (84.6)	32.0 (89.6)	35.0 (95.0)	37.1 (98.8)	38.5 (101.3)	36.3 (97.3)	34.6 (94.3)	34.0 (93.2)	34.0 (93.2)	33.0 (91.4)	29.5 (85.1)	28.3 (82.9)	33.5 (92.2)
Mean daily minimum °C (°F)	18.2 (64.8)	19.2 (66.6)	21.3 (70.3)	24.8 (76.6)	26.3 (79.3)	26.0 (78.8)	25.1 (77.2)	24.6 (76.3)	24.1 (75.4)	22.9 (73.2)	20.8 (69.4)	19.2 (66.6)	22.7 (72.9)
Record low °C (°F)	10.2 (50.4)	12.0 (53.6)	12.1 (53.8)	13.8 (56.8)	18.1 (64.6)	19.6 (67.3)	18.8 (65.8)	18.7 (65.7)	18.7 (65.7)	15.6 (60.1)	12.1 (53.8)	11.0 (51.8)	10.2 (50.4)
Average precipitation mm (inches)	9.0 (0.35)	7.1 (0.28)	5.9 (0.23)	21.8 (0.86)	83.9 (3.30)	71.0 (2.80)	117.0 (4.61)	124.9 (4.92)	149.6 (5.89)	176.9 (6.96)	155.2 (6.11)	78.6 (3.09)	1,000.9 (39.41)
Average precipitation days	0.8	0.5	0.4	1.3	4.7	5.3	6.6	7.8	7.6	9.4	7.7	3.9	56
Source: India Meteorological Department,

== Architecture ==
The Architecture of Oomerabad is a confluence of many architectural styles. From ancient Mosques and home with etching, beautiful tombs & minarets. The Architecture of Oomerabad has been featured in various newspapers. While Most of the Architecture are Indo-Saracenic, now at the 21st century steel, cement & Chrome building have become quite common

== See also ==
- JAMIA Darussalam University
