= Association for Protection of Civil Rights =

Indian Non-profit Organisation

- Association for Protection of Civil Rights
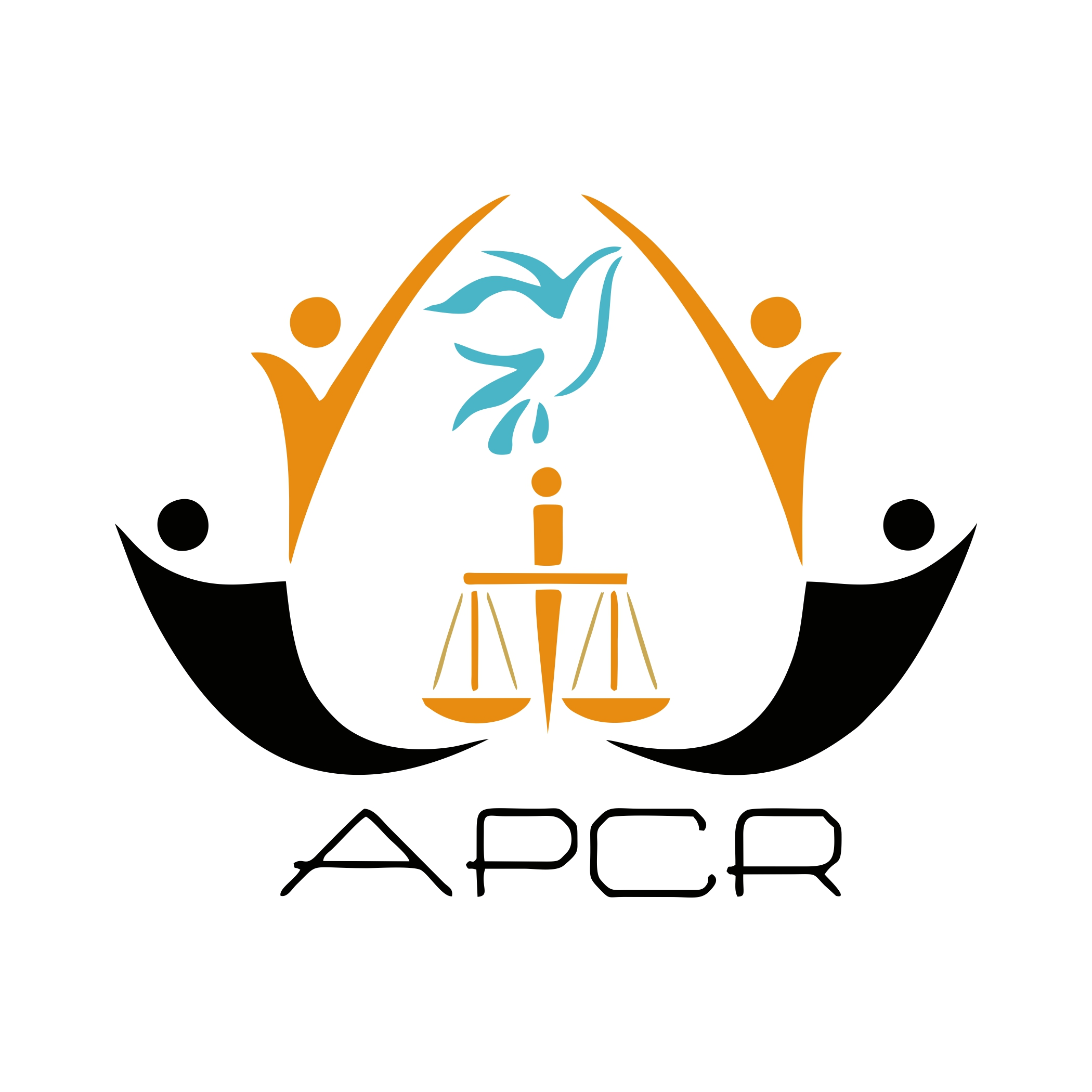
- Abbreviation: APCR
- Formation: 2006
- Type: Nonprofit
- Purpose: Creating opportunities for Justice
- Headquarters: New Delhi
- Secretary General: Malik Motasim Khan
- President: Yusuf Hatim Muchhala
- National Secretary: Nadeem Khan
- Website: apcrindia.in

Association for Protection of Civil Rights is a civil rights advocacy group comprising advocates, retired judges, social activists, human rights defenders, journalists, researchers, academics, students, and paralegal volunteers united in their commitment to advancing civil and human rights in India. APCR has steadfastly pursued its mission for 18 years and now operates across 18 states. The association is currently working in seventeen states

== History ==
Association for Protection of Civil Rights is Established in 2006 as a registered society, APCR focuses on promoting and protecting the rights of India’s underprivileged and marginalized communities.

== Object ==
- A plan to educate and inform the public about their civil rights.
- A help line to counsel and advise the deprived and the downtrodden.
- A training programme for social activities.
- An effort to protest and safeguard the legal rights of oppressed.
- A scheme to provide legal defense to the victims of injustice.
- A programme to eradicate oppression and injustice from the Indian scene.

== Fact-finding & documentation ==
APCR's lawyers, Researchers, social activists, and paralegal volunteers visits different parts of India to investigate the cases of human rights violations in association with other human rights organizations and present reports to flag the issue pertinent to the case. Some of these fact-findings and reports have led to directly impactful legal interventions, the Udaipur fact-finding report and the victim mentioned herein filed an intervention in an ongoing case in SC which became instrumental in the bench’s decision on drafting guidelines on punitive bulldozer demolitions.
