= Welfare Party of India =

- Abbreviation: WPI
- Leader: Dr. Raisuddin
- Founder: Syed Qasim Rasool Ilyas
- Founded: 18 April 2011; 15 years ago
- Headquarters: E-57/1, 2nd Floor, Scholars Apartment, A.F.E - Part 1. Okhla, New Delhi - 110025
- Student wing: Fraternity Movement
- Labour wing: Federation of Indian Trade Unions
- Ideology: Welfare state
- ECI status: Registered Unrecognised party

Website
- Official website

Welfare Party of India is an Indian political party. Its first National President was Mujtaba Farooq, and other key leaders were Syed Qasim Rasool Ilyas, Ilyas Azmi, Zafarul Islam Khan, Maulana Abdul Wahab Khilji and Lalita Naik. It works across India with state and district level committees.

== History ==
WPI was founded in 2011 under leadership of Syed Qasim Rasool Ilyas in Delhi.

== Known branches ==
The Welfare Party of Kerala is the Kerala unit of the Welfare Party of India. It was launched on 19 October 2011 at Tagore Hall, Kozhikode.

The organization argues for comprehensive land reform. Several struggles and seminars were organized by the landless people of Kerala.

It has a students' wing called Fraternity Movement.

== See also ==
- Fraternity Movement
- List of political parties in India
