= Prabodhanam =

- Cover page of Prabodhanam weekly 2010 Jan-16
- Editor: Mohammed Ashraf K
- Frequency: Weekly
- Publisher: M.K Mohammad Ali
- First issue: August 1949
- Company: Islamic Services Trust
- Based in: Silver Hills, Kozhikode, Kerala, India
- Language: Malayalam.
- Website: Prabodhanam.net

Prabodhanam (Malayalam: പ്രബോധനം) is a weekly Islamic magazine published in Malayalam from Kozhikode(Calicut) in Kerala, India.

== History ==
It began as a monthly publication in 1949 but was later turned into a weekly in 1964. The magazine is officially affiliated to the Kerala Branch of Jamaat-e-Islami Hind. Prabodhanam was founded by founder leaders of Kerala Halqa of Jamaat-e-Islami Hind, V.P. Mohammed Ali (Haji Sahib) and K.C. Abdullah Moulavi. The publisher of Prabodhanam is Islamic Services Trust based in Kozhikode. Prabodhanam celebrated its sixtieth anniversary in 2009.
