= Jamaat-e-Islami Hind =

Islamic organisation in India

Jamaat-e-Islami Hind جماعتِ اسلامی ہند
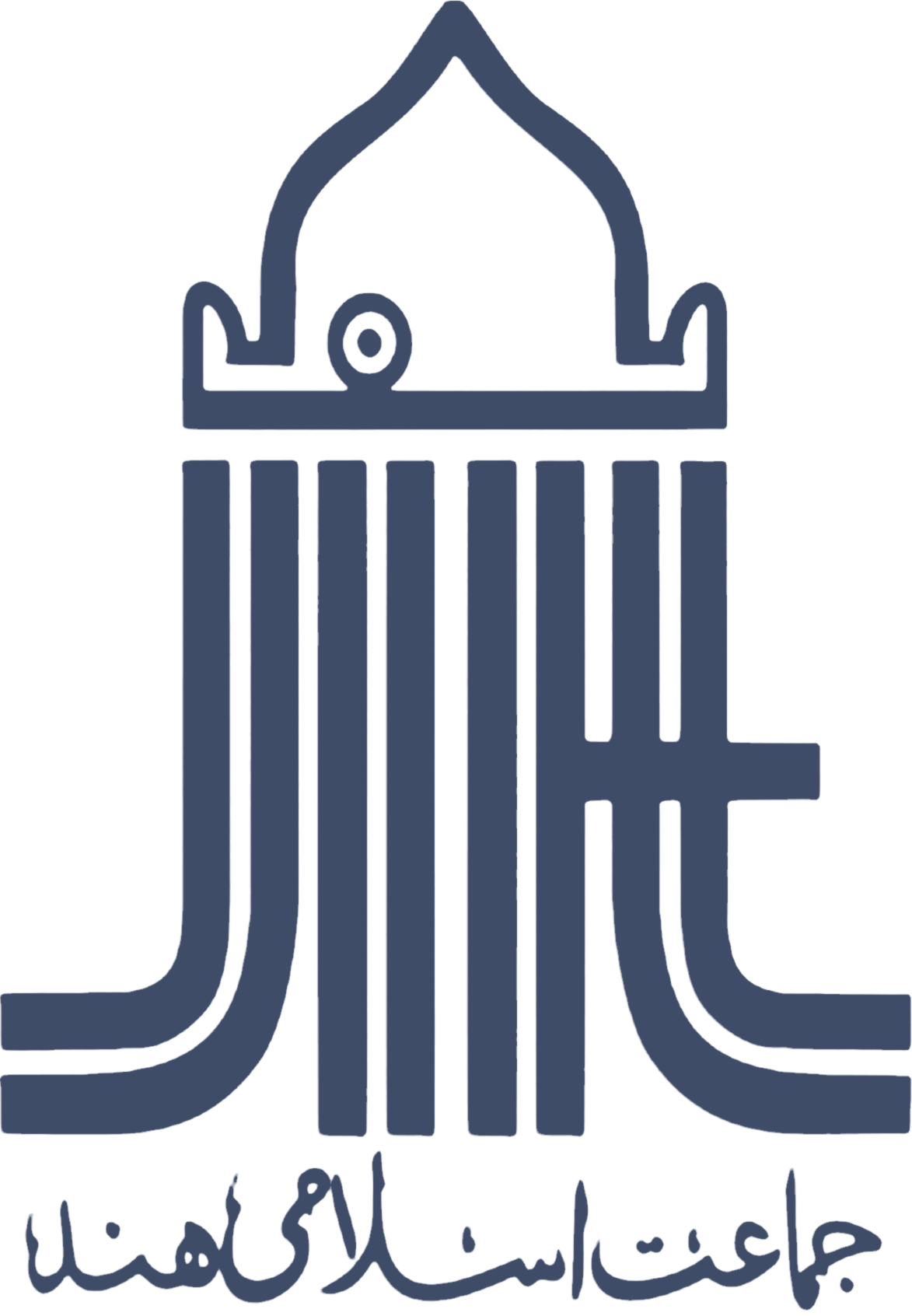
- Abbreviation: J.I.H.
- Formation: 16 April 1948 (78 years ago) (after splitting from main Jamaat-e-Islami)
- Legal status: Active
- Headquarters: D-321, Abul Fazal Enclave, Jamia Nagar, Okhla, New Delhi, India
- Region served: India
- Ameer (National President): Syed Sadatullah Husaini
- Affiliations: Jamaat-e-Islami (global)
- Website: jamaateislamihind.org/eng/

Jamaat-e-Islami Hind (Urdu: جماعتِ اسلامی ہند, abbreviated as JIH) is an Islamic organisation in India, founded as an offshoot of the Jamaat-e-Islami, which split into separate independent organisations in India, Pakistan, Bangladesh following the Partition of India in 1947.

Islam is the ideology of the Jamaat-e-Islami Hind. Its structure is based on its belief on the three-fold concept of the Oneness and sovereignty of God (Monotheism), the Concept of Prophet-hood and the Concept of Life after Death. From these fundamentals of belief follow the concepts of unity of all mankind, the purposefulness of man's life, and the universality of the way of life taught by Muhammad. JIH specifies its guiding principle as "Iqaamat-e-Deen" ("Establishment of the Islamic way in all aspects of life") in its constitution. Its guiding principle is that Islam is a complete way of life (rather than simply a set of worship practices). It provides "a practical doctrine and programme that can take the place of the failed man-made creeds of the 20th century".

While a relatively small party, with around 12,000 members and 500,000 sympathisers among India's 130 million Muslims, it follows a policy of promoting education, social service, and ecumenical outreach to the community and has involved itself in various humanitarian and relief efforts across many parts of India.

Jamaat-e-Islami Hind was officially formed in April 1948, at a meeting in Allahabad, Uttar Pradesh. The Government of India twice banned the organisation though both decisions were revoked by rulings from the Supreme Court of India. During the mid-1980s, it allowed its members to vote in elections in India. By 2002 it was described to be campaigning against advances by Hindu nationalists. On 18 April 2011, it facilitated the launch of a national political party Welfare Party of India, under a leadership that included top functionaries of the organisation and members from the wider Muslim community and outside, including a Christian priest.

== History ==
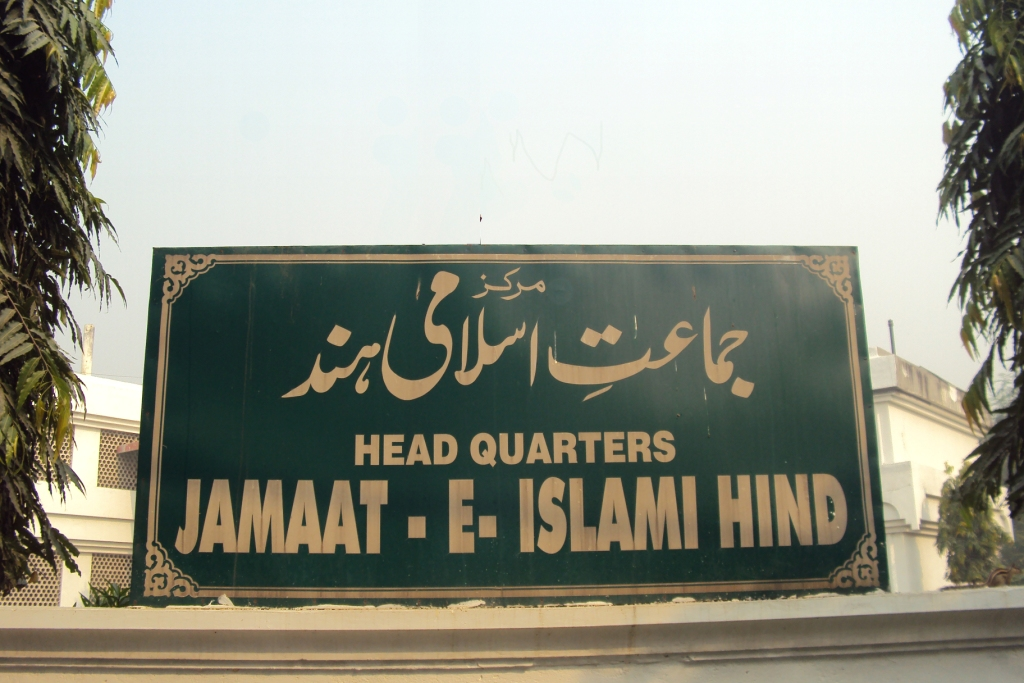
Headquarters in New Delhi

Jamaat-e-Islami as formed on 26 August 1941 at Lahore under the leadership of Sayyid Abul A'la Maududi. After the Partition members of the organisation remaining in what became the Republic of India, re-organised themselves to form an independent party, having its own Constitution and separate leadership and organisational structure from Jamaat-e-Islami, Pakistan. Although India was a Hindu-majority country, and beset by at times violent Hindu-Muslim sectarianism, Maududi believed that there was "at least a 60 per cent chance for Islam’s success" in India—Islam as a complete way of life, devoid of nationalism, socialism, liberalism or any other non-Islamic ideologies.

The Indian Jamaat-e-Islami came into being in April 1948 at Allahabad and was officially called "Jamaat-e-Islami Hind". 240 members attended the first meeting and elected Maulana Abul Lais Nadvi as their Amir (leader), and established their headquarters at Malihabad, Lucknow, U.P. Later, the headquarters was shifted to Rampur in 1949 and then to New Delhi in 1960.

Jamaat-e-Islami Hind then underwent a process of reorganisation, reframing its constitution and written policy. The new constitution came into effect on 13 April 1956. The organisation held an All-India Meet at Rampur (U.P) in 1951 followed by meetings at Hyderabad (1952) Delhi (1960), Hyderabad (1967), Delhi (1974), Hyderabad (1981), Hyderabad (1997) and Delhi (2002). It has also held regional conferences on various occasions in different parts of the country. The state chapters of the organisation also hold separate conferences at regular intervals.

The organisation was banned twice by the Government of India during its seven decades of existence, the first temporarily during the Emergency of 1975–1977 and then in 1992 under the Unlawful Activities (Prevention) Act. While the first was revoked after the Emergency was lifted, the second was reversed by the Supreme Court of India on the grounds that the allegations of unlawful activities and questioning of India's sovereignty were not substantiated with concrete legal evidence. The affidavits provided by the government were based on intelligence reports without disclosing their sources, preventing Jamaat-e-Islami Hind from effectively rebutting the claims.

== Objective ==
Officially, the organisation describes its objective as "Iqaamat-e-Deen" or "Establishment of (Islamic) way of life in all aspects of life" with "achievement of divine pleasure and success in the Hereafter" as the sole motive of the effort. It also defines it core doctrine as "La Ilaha Illallahu Muhammadur Rasulullah", i.e. "the Divine Being is solely Allah, there being no God except Him, and that Muhammad is Allah's messenger". It also states that the Quran and Sunnah would be its base, and all objectives would be achieved only through constructive and peaceful methods of propagation.

The JIH programme as of 2014 includes "a clear exposition of the teachings of Islam which is shorn of all false ideas and purged of all unhealthy accretions", to emphasise the Qur’an, the Sunnah in Islam, rather than the opinions of Islamic scholars, reaching "out to the persons who are disposed to righteousness, and are inclined to work for the establishment of righteousness in human life" and organise them, "striving to bring about societal change and to effect reform in the light of Islamic teachings", and a change of "intellectual leadership, social and cultural leadership, and ultimately, political leadership."

== Organisation ==
Headquarters building of the Kerala Chapter of Jamaat-e-Islami

Sadat Husaini, the current Amir (Leader) heads a central decision-making body, called the Majlis-e-Shoora (Central Advisory Council). Country-wide, it is organised into 17 zones each presided over by a regional amir. The JIH also has a women's organisation (JIH Women's Wing) and a students' wing Students Islamic Organisation. It is estimated to have around 7,000 core members, some 50,000 party workers and 300,000 "associates" (as active sympathisers are called) all over India. The organisation is considered to have an influence "out of proportion to its numbers" because of "disciplined organisation, welfare work, its reputation for honesty and street power".

Jamaat is a player in national level bodies for the Muslim community in India like the All India Muslim Majlis-e-Mushawarat, All India Muslim Personal Law Board, and All India Babri Masjid Movement Coordination Committee. It has also involved itself in inter-faith forums like Movement for Peace and Justice (MPJ), and Forum for Democracy and Communal Amity (FDCA). MPJ and FDCA have played an active role in bringing peace to many violence-hit areas across the country and in protecting civil rights.

=== Women's wing ===
The organisation has active participation from the women of the community through its women's wing and its feeder organisation, the Girls Islamic Organisation of India. In February 2006, its Andhra Pradesh wing organised a two-days State Women's conference, the first of its kind at Hyderabad drawing more than 30,000 Muslim women. Speakers at the event emphasised the rights and privileges of women pertaining to education and employment within the framework of Islam and condemned practices like dowry as "un-islamic". The presence of its women was also notice-able in the recent mass rallies demanding a separate state of Telangana.

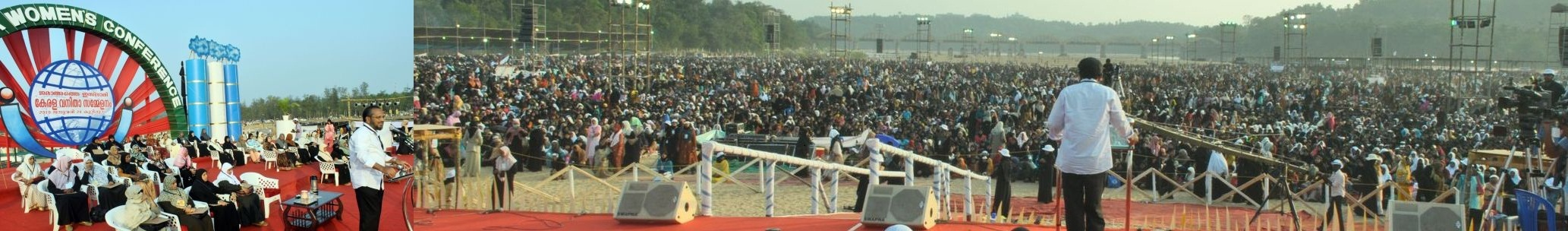
The "Amir" of JIH Kerala Chapter, T. Arifali addressing the "Kerala Vanitha Sammelanam", a state-level conference of its women's wing at Kuttipuram, Kerala on 24 January 2010.

In January 2010, the women's wing in the state of Kerala organised its State Women's Conference. The conference was inaugurated over video-conferencing by Yvonne Ridley as she was denied a visa by the government of India. The conference issued resolutions calling for reforms in Muslim Personal Law, action against dowry and reclaim of family values.

In February 2021, the Women's Wing launched ‘Strong Family Strong Society’, a nationwide campaign aimed to create awareness about the "deteriorating family structure" with the intention to reach out to both Muslim and non-Muslim communities.

The Women's Wing launched two e-magazines — Aura (English) and Hadiya (Urdu) — in March 2021 to serve as a platform for women to express their issues.

== Social Services ==
National leaders of Jamaat-e-Islami with former Chief Justice of India, AM Ahmadi releasing the book "A Guide To Uplift Minorities" Published by: Social Service Wing, Jamat-e-Islami Hind.

The Social Service Wing of the Jamaat coordinates with various NGOs in India like the Ideal Relief Wing Kerala (IRW), Islamic Relief Committee (IRC) and Tamil Nadu Relief Committee (TNRC). The IRW was an active participant in the rescue efforts during the Kashmir earthquake spending almost $200,000 for the relief work and also played important roles in the relief efforts in the aftermath of the Asian tsunami and the 2008 Mumbai attacks. The TNRC built 38 houses for victims of the Asian tsunami in Tamil Nadu at a total cost of Rs 12.5 million. It also built 160 permanent houses at Nagore, Pudupattinam and Kottakuppam and provided livelihood assistance to hundreds of families in those areas.

The Islamic Relief Committee Gujarat played a major role in rehabilitation of the people of Gujarat in the aftermath of the Gujarat riots and the Gujarat earthquake. It spent almost Rs 40 million for victims of the riots, building 1,321 new homes and repairing 4,946 damaged ones. It allocated another 40 million rupees for the victims of the Gujarat earthquake. It also led the legal proceedings against the accused in the aftermath of the riots

Association for Protection of Civil Rights (APCR), an NGO for legal activities backed by the Jamaat works for legal action against human rights violations especially for backward communities and minorities. It has worked along with other NGOs like the PUCL and ANHAD (Act Now for Harmony And Democracy) in contesting the official version of the encounter killings at Batla House, Jamia Nagar in Delhi on 19 September 2008. It has also opposed armed confrontation as a solution to the Maoist insurgency in parts of India.

=== Political activity ===
On 18 April 2011, JIH facilitated the launch of a national political party Welfare Party of India, under a leadership that included top functionaries of the organisation and members from the wider Muslim community and outside, including a Christian priest.

=== Educational activity ===
The Jamaat has also campaigned to create educational awakening and promote human rights among the general public and the Muslim community in particular. In 2006, it launched a 10-year, INR 55 billion ($125 million) action plan named "Vision 2016" to create educational, health and housing facilities to improve the situation of poor Muslims in India. Its first phase is focused on 58 backward districts in India where it plans to establish health care centers, schools, vocational training centers, small-scale industries and low-cost housing and provide soft loans for small-scale trade and other ventures.

== Views ==
=== Economic issues ===
In general, Jamaat follows an anti-liberalisation and anti-globalisation policy on economic issues. More specifically, it has opposed the central government policies on

- Foreign Direct Investment (FDI)
- Special Economic Zones (SEZ)
- Abolition of subsidies
- Privatisation of health care, education and other services.

Underlying its stance on the issues, its policy document asserts that providing the citizens with the basic necessities of life was the responsibility of the government and aspects of profit and loss should be viewed as of the general public collectively. It has also blamed interest based loans for the increasing suicides of farmers in India. As a solution to the ill-effects of economic situation, the organisation puts forward economic policies of the Islamic economic system derived from Islamic teachings as the only alternative to achieve economic justice.

=== Terrorism in India ===
The organisation condemned all incidents of bomb blasts and disruptive acts in various parts of the country and demanded an "impartial and honest probe into all such incidents" and formation of "a sensible and effective strategy to check such incidents". It has also voiced its concern on what it sees as a prejudiced approach by the authorities and the media to blame the Muslim community in the immediate aftermath of such incidents. It passed a resolution in October 2008 saying:

Innocent Muslims are ... subjected to police terror and witch hunting and an anti-Muslim hype is created without any evidence or proof. This oft-repeating scenario..created in a section of Muslims a sense of disillusionment and fear, extreme anger and unrest in another section. On the other hand, this ... widens the unfortunate communal divide which encourages the disruptive forces and elements.

It has also condemned the human rights violations on the detainees and suspects and expressed its doubts on confessions extracted in such situations. Addressing the Muslim community, it asks them to "remain calm and not be provoked or get disillusioned but seek the Almighty's help and guidance in these difficult times. They should not bow down to harassment and terror but should resist the tide of injustice with the help of all peace loving citizens of the country."

=== Communalism and riots ===
On the issue of communalism and riots, the Jamaat-e-Islami Hind has been in the fore front of opposing any sort of imposition of particular religion, culture and language on others by force. It has often said that, creating animosity, hatred in the name of religion among different groups is not acceptable. It has also laid stress on the importance of freedom of faith and religion and would oppose any legislations which violate this freedom. The organisation highlighted that the Uniform Civil Code (UCC) could serve as a "lightning rod for polarisation".

=== Foreign position ===
Political position of the Jama'at-e-Islami is Anti-America, and Anti-Zionism.

Global terrorism

The Central Advisory Council of the Jamaat-e-Islami Hind adopted a resolution on 9 November 2001:

Terrorism is an outright oppressive act ... condemnable whether it is committed by an individual or a group or a State, and whosoever is its target. Some people having immoderate sentiments associate terrorism with religion while religion strictly opposes it. As for Islam, killing an innocent person is tantamount to killing all human being and saving the life of a person is saving the entire human folk. The 11 September attacks on the two cities of America are highly condemnable.

War in Afghanistan

It also condemned the invasion of Afghanistan by the US as an action taken without any proof and hence "an oppressive and terroristic act...as innocent persons are being killed."

Israel-Hamas war

Jamaat-e-Islami Hind appreciates South Africa’s role in dragging Israel to the ICJ, and welcomes India’s decision to vote in favor of UN resolution against Israeli settlements.

== National leaders ==
- Syed Sadatullah Husaini
- T. Arif Ali
- Mujtaba Farooq
- Jalaluddin Umri
- Yusuf Islahi
- H Abdul Raqeeb
- K. A. Siddique Hassan
- Dr Mohammad Rafat
- Dr Syed Qasim Rasool Ilyas
- Dr Raziul Islam Nadvi
- Dr Saleem Khan
- Zahoor Ul Hasan
- Syed Mohammad Jafar

=== Former Presidents ===
Sl. No.	Name	Term
1	Maulana Sayed Abul A'la Maududi	1941–1947
2	Maulana Abul Lais Islahi Nadvi	1948–1972 and 1981–1990
3	Maulana Mohammed Yusuf	1972–1981
4	Maulana Muhammad Sirajul Hassan	1990–2003
5	Dr. Muhammad Abdul Haq Ansari	2003–2007
6	Maulana Jalaluddin Umri	2007–2019
7	Syed Sadatullah Husaini	2019–present

== See also ==
- Islam in India
- Solidarity Youth Movement
- Students Islamic Organisation of India
- Welfare party of India
