= Students Islamic Organisation of India =

Student Organisation in India

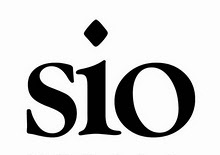
- Abbreviation: SIO India
- Formation: 19 October 1982; 44 years ago
- Type: Student Organisation
- Legal status: Active
- Headquarters: D-300 Abul Fazal Enclave, Jamia Nagar, Okhla, New Delhi, India
- Location: All over India
- Secretary General: Adv. Anees Rahman
- National President: Abdul Hafeez
- Publication: The Companion (English magazine); Chatra Vimarsh (Hindi magazine); Rafeeq E Manzil (Urdu magazine)
- Parent organisation: Jamaat-e-Islami Hind
- Website: www.sio-india.org

The Students Islamic Organisation of India (SIO) is the students' wing of Jamaat-e-Islami Hind. It was formed in 1982. According to its constitution, its aims are presenting Da’wah before students and youth and promoting virtues and moral values in educational institutions.

Mission Statement of SIO "to prepare the students and youths for the reconstruction of the society in the light of Divine Guidance".

SIO has been described as a moderate Muslim students union, and is said to take part in social service and relief activities. It is reported to organise activities for the Muslim youths in order to engage them in peaceful religious activities, and to avoid communal activity and sentiment. It was mentioned as one of the best examples of youth inter-faith dialogue initiatives in a UNESCO global survey report.

== Overview ==
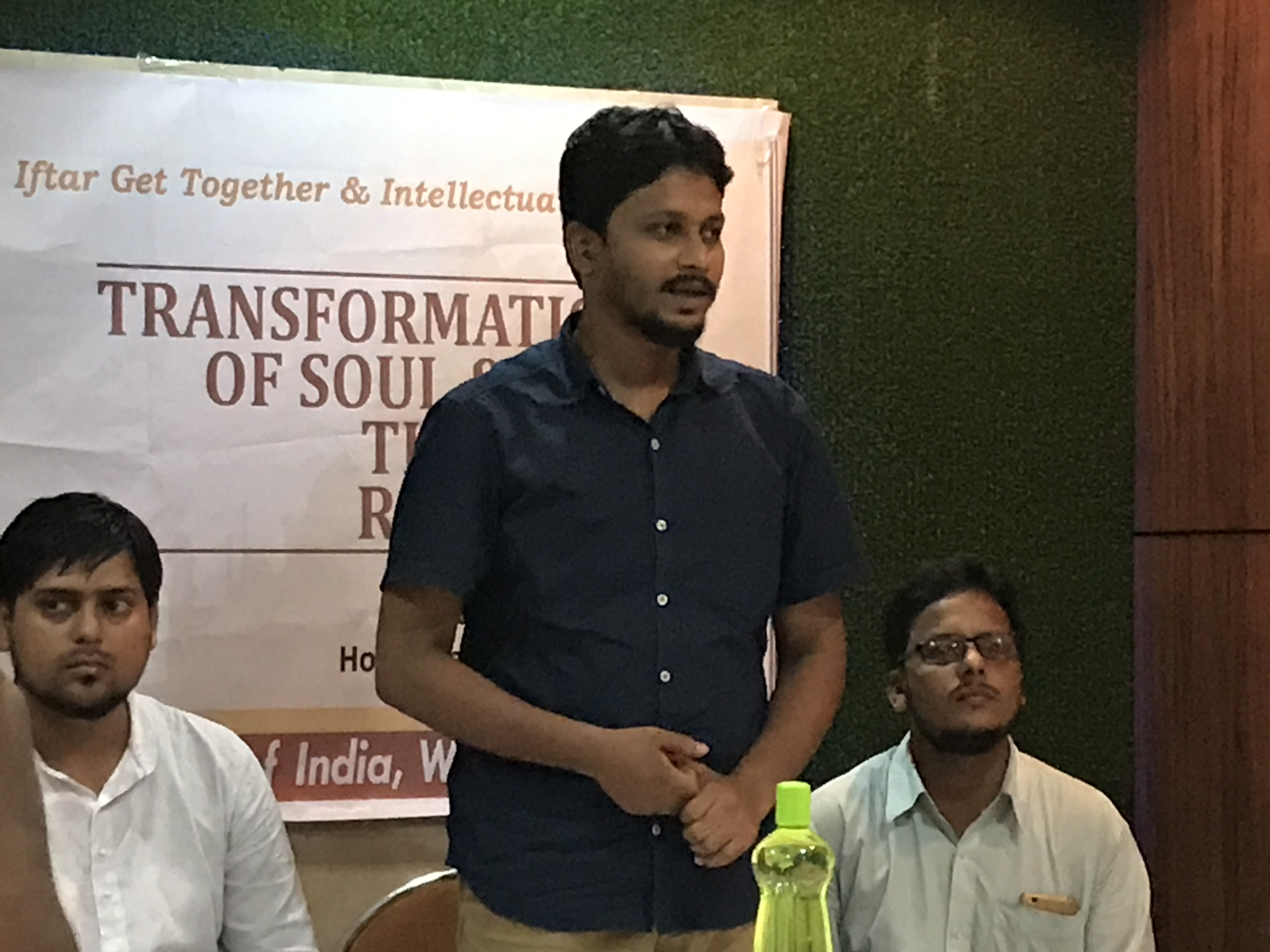
Iftar meeting organised by SIO's West Bengal Branch

The Students Islamic Organisation of India (SIO) is an ideological organisation working in the country since its inception on 19 October 1982 for social progress and the development of students’ fraternity. Its headquarters is in Delhi, and it has spread to most states. Students of many religions, castes, creeds and places are now part of the organisation and working proactively for its cause.

SIO works to spread education and awareness among students. The organisation promotes better academic and moral atmosphere in educational institutions. Its mission is "to prepare the students and youths for the reconstruction of the society in the light of Divine Guidance".

== Activism ==
=== Student Elections ===
During University of Hyderabad Students Union Elections 2017-18 all the democratic forces in the campus had united to form a grand alliance named Alliance for Social Justice (ASJ) against the ABVP-OBCF alliance. The alliance consists of Ambedkar Students Association (ASA) led front which includes SIO and MSF and Students Federation of India (SFI) along with its former allies DSU, TSF, TVV as well as BSF.

In Aligarh Muslim University Students Union Election 2018–19, Ferdous Ahmed Barbhuiya made it to Cabinet Membership, by bagging 4th position. He also has the credit of being the only North Eastern who became the Zonal Secretary of SIO, Aligarh.

=== Protests ===
SIO protested in Badaun, Western Uttar Pradesh, on 8 February 2017, to find the missing student Najeeb Ahamed. Protests were conducted in Delhi as well.

14 Aligarh Muslim University students were booked under NSA after protest turned violent. Various student bodies including SIO expressed solidarity with Aligarh Muslim University and called for the revocation of sedition cases against 14 students of AMU in a joint press conference held on 15 February 2019.

On 23 October 2019, SIO along with other student bodies condemned the attack by "hired goons" on Jamia Millia Islamia students, who were protesting against the university administration for allowing Israeli event in the campus and demanded swift redressal extending support to the protesting students.

The Nanded Police, in a joint operation with the Mumbai Crime Branch, detained a SIO leader in Maharashtra for allegedly giving a provocative speech during an anti-Citizenship Amendment Act (CAA) protest at Nanded on 1 February 2020.

=== Hijab ===
SIO defends Muslim women's right to wear hijab.

=== Exhibition ===
"Think. Act. Save." was a three-day exhibition, organized by the Hyderabad chapter of the SIO of India at the Exhibition Grounds in Nampally to create environmental awareness.

== Education ==
SIO, actively involved in education related contemporary issues. Protests, campaigns and legal actions initiated by SIO on various occasions.

=== Centre for Educational Research & Training (CERT) ===
CERT was established in February 2017 as a resource & guidance centre for students & researchers, supported by the Department of Education SIO of India. CERT is committed to promote & conduct research programmes in the field of Education. CERT engages in the academic realm with innovative approaches to re-frame educational policies. It maintains a wide network of students and research scholars, who are creatively contributing in knowledge production and intellectual capital.

=== Students Manifesto released 2019 ===
SIO of India released a 'Student Manifesto' ahead of the general elections, urged political parties to include the demands in their manifestos. Demands included increase in stipends, Arabic and Islamic studies chairs be opened in all universities, reservation in educational institutions as per the recommendations of the Sachar Committee report, extra attention to children with special needs.

The section on education in the manifesto sharply criticizes the central and state governments for their poor implementation of the Right to Education Act, and makes a number of recommendations to improve efficiency and transparency. It also demanded to enact Rohit Act, to ensure legislative protection for students from marginalised communities in higher educational institutions—and to establish AMU off campus centres in minority concentrated districts.

== Environmental ==
=== Environmental Impact Assessment (EIA) 2020 ===
On behalf of SIO, one the largest students’ body in India, Syed Azharuddin, General Secretary of the organization has submitted the letter, through email, to Shri Prakash Javadekar, Hon Union Minister of Environment, Forests and Climate Change.

=== Farmers and Daily wage workers Suicide ===
According to the latest NCRB data, as many as 42,480 farmers and daily wagers committed suicide in 2019. Referring to the high number of suicidal cases among the farmers and day wagers, SIO General Secretary, Syed Azharuddin said "The industry which has more than 3% growth is Agriculture when GDP reduced to 23% and the situation of its care takers is in front of us,"

== Relief work ==
=== Lockdown 2020 ===
They have been involved in relief works during COVID-19 in India. They had provided ration kits to around 50,000 families. They also provided temporary accommodations for students as many students were stranded during sudden lockdown.

== Controversy ==
In 2020, a SIO leader was arrested for making a "provocative speech" during Citizenship Amendment Act protests. SIO condemned the arrest as a "Witch hunt".

In 2024, SIO conducted funeral prayers in Kerala, after Hamas leader Yahya Sinwar was killed by Israel, leading to criticism on social media.

== See also ==
- Solidarity Youth Movement
- Students' Islamic Movement of India
