= SOS Children's Villages India =

- Formation: 1964
- Founder: Hermann Gmeiner, Jagan Nath Kaul
- Type: NGO
- Headquarters: Vasant Kunj, New Delhi, India
- Coordinates: 28.5311°N 77.1493°E
- Key people: Sudha Sastri (President); Sumanta Kar (CEO)
- Parent organization: SOS Children's Villages
- Staff: 1,581 (2025)
- Website: www.soschildrensvillages.in

SOS Children's Villages India (also known as SOS CVI) is an Indian non-governmental child welfare organization headquartered in New Delhi. Established in 1964, the organization provides family-based alternative care and community support to orphaned, abandoned, and economically vulnerable children. It operates as an autonomous national association affiliated with the global international federation SOS Children's Villages.

The organization manages 32 SOS Children's Villages and associated community development projects across 22 states and Union Territories in India.

== History ==
The global SOS Children's Villages movement was established in 1949 by Austrian philanthropist Hermann Gmeiner. In 1964, Gmeiner visited India following an invitation from Prime Minister Jawaharlal Nehru to introduce the family-based childcare model to the country.

Following the visit, the first SOS Children's Village in India was established at Greenfields in Faridabad, Haryana. Social worker Jagan Nath Kaul served as the co-founder and founding president of the Indian entity. Over subsequent decades, the organization expanded its operations across India, incorporating emergency disaster response during natural disasters such as earthquakes and cyclones.

== Care Model and Programs ==
SOS Children's Villages India conducts its operations through two primary intervention programs:

=== Family-Like Care ===
The Family-Like Care (FLC) program provides long-term residential alternative care for children without parental care. Under this model, children reside in dedicated family homes located within an SOS Village. Each home is managed by a full-time resident caregiver, referred to as an "SOS Mother", who cares for a group of 8 to 10 children.

=== Family Strengthening Programme ===
The Family Strengthening Programme (FSP) is a preventive initiative designed to prevent child abandonment by supporting vulnerable families in neighboring communities. The program provides vocational training, nutritional support, and micro-finance assistance to single mothers, widows, and low-income households.

=== Educational Facilities ===
The organization operates formal educational institutions, including SOS Hermann Gmeiner School, Bhimtal in Uttarakhand (established in 1984) and SOS Hermann Gmeiner School, Faridabad (established in 1986), alongside vocational training centers.

== Locations ==
The organization manages facilities across 22 states and Union Territories, including:

- Faridabad, Haryana
- Bhimtal, Uttarakhand
- Bawana, Delhi
- Guwahati, Assam
- Begusarai, Bihar
- Varanasi, Uttar Pradesh
- Visakhapatnam, Andhra Pradesh
- Bengaluru, Karnataka
- Kochi, Kerala
- Bhopal, Madhya Pradesh

== Recognition and Awards ==
- National Award for Child Welfare (1998): Awarded by the Government of India to the SOS Children's Village in Cochin.
- Best Non-Governmental Organization Award (2006): Awarded by the Government of India for care provided to children with special needs.

== See also ==
- SOS Children's Villages
- Hermann Gmeiner
- Jagan Nath Kaul
