= Farida Khanam (scholar) =

Indian Islamic scholar

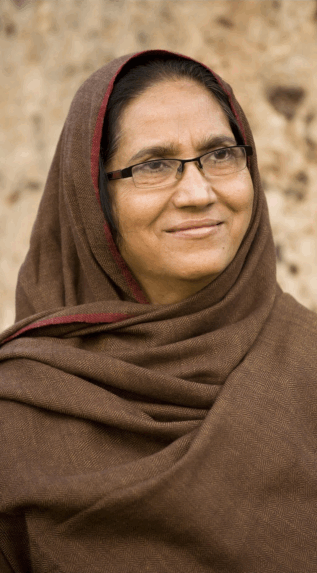
- Born: 1952 (age 73–74)
- Father: Wahiduddin Khan
- Relatives: Zafarul Islam Khan (brother); Saniyasnain Khan (brother)

Farida Khanam (born 1952) is an Islamic scholar, speaker, author, translator, and peace activist. She spent more than two and half decades teaching Islamic Studies at Jamia Millia Islamia, New Delhi, India where she also earned her Master's and PhD. She is the current chairperson of CPS International. She is the daughter of the noted Islamic Scholar Maulana Wahiduddin Khan and has edited and translated his commentary of the Quran, Tazkirul Quran into English. Prof. Farida Khanam is the editor-in-chief and translator of many of Maulana Wahiduddin Khan's works.

== Selected works ==
- The Quran. Vaḥīduddīn K̲h̲ān̲, Farīdah K̲h̲ānam. New Delhi: Goodword Books. 2009. ISBN 978-81-7898-653-1. OCLC 607794294.
- K̲h̲ān̲, Vaḥīduddīn (2011). Peace in Kashmir. Farīdah K̲h̲ānam. New Delhi. ISBN 978-81-7898-741-5. OCLC 936644151.
- K̲h̲ān̲, Vaḥīduddīn (1999). Introducing Islam : a simple introduction to Islam. Farida Khanam. [New Delhi]: Goodword Books. ISBN 81-87570-02-4. OCLC 48218103.
- K̲h̲ān̲, Vaḥīduddīn (2003). The ideology of peace : towards a culture of peace. Farida Khanam. New Delhi: Goodword Books. ISBN 81-7898-129-7. OCLC 495614013.
- K̲h̲ān̲, Vaḥīduddīn (1999). The moral vision. Farida Khanam. [New Delhi]: Goodword Books. ISBN 81-87570-01-6. OCLC 48219067.
- K̲h̲ān̲, Vaḥīduddīn (1999). Islam and peace. Farida Khanam. [New Delhi]: Goodword Books. ISBN 81-85063-60-5. OCLC 48218149.
- K̲h̲ānam, Farīdah (September 2014). A study of world's major religions. Aurangabad. ISBN 978-93-5179-002-0. OCLC 993077586.
- Khanam, Farida (2006). A simple guide to Sufism. New Delhi: Goodword Books. ISBN 81-7898-482-2. OCLC 294942344.
- Khanam, Farida (2003). Life and teachings of the prophet Muhammad : its relevance in a global context. New Delhi: Goodword Books. ISBN 81-7898-338-9. OCLC 308613492.
- K̲h̲ān̲, Vaḥīduddīn (2001). Islam as it is. Farida Khanam. New Delhi: Goodword Books. ISBN 81-87570-66-0. OCLC 65471525.
- K̲h̲ān̲, Vaḥīduddīn (1999). The call of the Qur'an. Farida Khanam. [New Delhi]: Goodword Books. ISBN 81-87570-03-2. OCLC 48218064.
