= United World College of Costa Rica =

United World College Costa Rica
- Santa Ana, San José 9°56′18.89″N 84°10′49.07″W; Costa Rica

Information
- Type: International Baccalaureate
- Established: August 2006
- President: Nelson Mandela; Queen Noor
- Principal: Mauricio Viales Salas
- Enrollment: 172
- Affiliation: United World Colleges; SOS Children's Villages
- Website: www.uwccostarica.org

The United World College Costa Rica (UWC Costa Rica, also known by its acronym UWCCR) (Spanish - Colegio del Mundo Unido Costa Rica), located in the Santa Ana suburb of San José, is the 11th college in the UWC movement and the first to offer instruction in both English and Spanish. The College, formerly the "Colegio Internacional SOS Hermann Gmeiner," (named after the SOS Children's Villages' founder, Hermann Gmeiner) re-opened as a United World College in August 2006, and graduated its first UWC-admitted applicants in 2008.

The school hosts over 200 students from more than 70 countries. Students attending colleges throughout the UWC movement are selected on the basis of merit, and with the support to an extensive scholarship program, are accepted regardless of their social or economic status. Given its historic connection with SOS Children's Villages, UWC Costa Rica aims to ensure that students from socio-economically disadvantaged backgrounds are admitted to the school each year. Depending on their academic needs, students may apply for a three-year programme with a preparatory pre-IB year before enrolling in the regular IB Diploma Programme.

The college is primarily committed to three areas: conflict resolution, the environment and multiculturalism.

== Programs ==
=== Selection and admissions of students ===
Every year the College makes offers of places and scholarships to the UWC national committees, which select students to create a student body which reflects the priorities and identity of the College but within the context of their financial resources. UWC Costa Rica is committed to having at least 50% of students from Latin America, a significant population of students from socioeconomically disadvantaged backgrounds, and an overall global diversity.

=== Academic programs ===
==== International Baccalaureate ====
The College provide students a pre-university academic program for the 11th and 12th grades. It is designed to encourage independent thinking and develop global perspectives of development. The IB Diploma Programme is a rigorous academic program that prepares students for university life. The students of the IB Diploma Programme are required to study six subjects in different areas: Language A (first language), Language B (second language), Experimental Sciences, Individuals and Society, Mathematics and Arts. The areas are complemented with a course on Theory of Knowledge and the Program Creativity, Action, and Service. Students are also required to write an Extended Essay; a 4000 word research project from a self formulated question within a subject.

==== University Counseling program ====
The IB Diploma Programme offered by UWC Costa Rica, which is a rigorous and comprehensive course of study, is intended for university-bound students. It is expected that 90% or more of UWC Costa Rica graduates will enter higher studies soon after graduation, though several of them will take gap years to travel and volunteer while a few others will fulfill national service obligations or work first. Therefore, the University Counseling program was created to support and advise students with their individual plans, particularly the college/university selection and application process. Because many UWC Costa Rica students come from socioeconomically disadvantaged backgrounds, special emphasis is placed on identifying scholarship opportunities. The University Counselor is also responsible for introducing and supporting UWC Costa Rica students to colleges, universities, scholarship committees, gap year programs, and other relevant constituencies. For example, more than fifty colleges and universities recruit UWC Costa Rica students, offering presentations and interviews and the University Counselor will host these visits.

=== Co-curricular programs ===
==== CAS program ====
The CAS program is an integral part of the IB Diploma programme. Its design and concept in UWC Costa Rica reflects the organizational philosophy of the United World Colleges by putting a strong emphasis on public service and social responsibility. The CAS program in UWC Costa Rica is characterized by activities for students that generate an impact on their lives. This array of activities is divided in the three main areas of CAS: Creativity, Action, and Service. Students are also able to start and lead their own clubs under the CAS program, provided that they are based on the UWC Costa Rica pillars.

===== Creativity =====
The Creativity programs taught in UWC Costa Rica are characterized by their adaptability and they change every semester. The Creativity programs take advantage of the strong leadership of students and give them the opportunity to lead some of the activities besides ones that are already led by adults, teachers or external instructors throughout the school year.

===== Action =====
Most of the Action programs at UWC Costa Rica are taught by professional instructors. One of the goals of the program is the creation of sports teams that train and participate in tournaments in local high schools.

===== Service =====
The service programs at UWC Costa Rica are characterized by a focus on community service. There are different institutions and sectors of the community that throughout the years have become traditions within the service programs.

==== Theme Week ====
The Theme Week program provides the students the opportunity to develop a relevant topic during one week. In general, these theme weeks are related to the three pillars of the College. Some examples are the cultural weeks by regions where there are exhibitions, debates, or preparation of typical dishes. Topics developed can be related to the worldwide reality or to the community service area. In general, the theme weeks are organized by the leaders of the pillars and a group of students and provide the community with an agenda of different activities.

==== 'Conociendo Costa Rica' (Getting to Know Costa Rica) ====
The Conociendo Costa Rica Program provides students with the opportunity to visit and get to know Costa Rica outside the school campus. This program takes place alongside the academic activities, the community service or any other activities the students normally perform. Its aim is to visit places such as national parks, archaeological sites, organized communities, etc. and usually is based on the school's pillars.

==== Project Week ====
Project Week is a unique program where students are able to choose from a variety of service based opportunities within and at times outside Costa Rica. Aimed to strengthen the importance of community service, students can find themselves immersed in various projects from building and maintaining paths in national parks to teaching English in local schools.

==== Service to Campus ====
Service to Campus is a program that offers UWC Costa Rica students the opportunity to participate in several areas of campus upkeep, such as gardening, helping in the kitchen, recycling, and assisting the running of the campus library.

==== Sports program ====
The sports program, supervised by a sports professional, works together with the Action component of the CAS program. Through sports activities on weekdays and weekends, individualized follow up and a strict working plan, the sports program objective is to give the students the opportunity to enjoy a healthy lifestyle and to develop sport habits that can last for a lifetime.

==== Music program ====
The music program provides students the opportunity to participate in concerts and musical activities throughout the school year. These activities take place both on and off campus.

=== Residential Life Program ===
Purpose: “To offer an efficient system with support nets for the students and develop a home like environment out of home where all members of the community are active participants according to the UWC Costa Rica and UWC values and pillars for the intercultural understanding, the experience of peace and the protection of the environment.”

==== Integrated Health Program ====
The Integrated Health Program’s work is based on education and prevention. It aims to train the community of the College to develop a healthy lifestyle. It focuses its attention on the physical, emotional, and psychological health of students as well as on the practice of sports, and the strengthening of life skills.

==== Social and Cultural program ====
This program aims to offer spaces for the social and cultural exchange. The program encourages the organization of regular and optional student-led cultural and social events. These events can be organized for the entire community or for smaller groups of residences, tutor groups, or any other group such as geographical or ethnic groups.

==== Host Family Program ====
This program is intended to allow students to spend time with Costa Rican families or foreign families resident here. Through this program, both the students and the families benefit from the exchange of customs, ideas, and culture.

==== Mediation Program ====
Based on the pillars of the College, and particularly the pillar of Conflict Transformation, the College objective is to promotes a culture of dialogue, respect, and tolerance as part of the daily life of its community. Therefore, efforts are focused to solve conflict through the mentioned elements whenever possible. Mediation is then used to repair and rebuild in a positive way the relations among the members of the community. Every year, a group of students is trained on this topic to facilitate conflict resolution processes and navigate differences between students.

==== Student Service Program ====
This program supports the students in all matters related to migration processes before their arrival, during their stay, and when leaving the country. It also supports the students with local and international transportation matters.

==== Emergency Program ====
This program deals with the prevention and attention of emergencies and accidents – individual, group, or institutional. This includes health matters, problems in infrastructure, and external matters that may affect the College such as natural disasters.

=== Support structure in the residential life ===
==== Residence Coordinator ====
The Residence Coordinator is a staff member who supports students throughout the school year, to assist them with community living and their emotional needs, to improve their college experience. Each coordinator is in charge of one residence and holds a weekly meeting with its members. These meetings are intended to analyze the internal organization, rules, cleaning duties, and rights of students living in residence, among others. Furthermore, the coordinator can make any necessary decisions for the proper functioning of the residence and the fulfillment of the institutional objectives. A relation of confidence is expected. Moreover, the Residence Coordinator is expected to strengthen the group's coexistence.

==== Tutor ====
A teaching staff member is responsible for providing support, guidance and orientation to each group of students, especially in the academic area. The tutor serves as a counselor and a guide while trying to elicit constant improvement from the students in their co-curricular activities as well as in their community life. A relation of confidence is expected where the student feels supported and guided to constantly improve. Tutors also intervene in the disciplinary processes of the students fulfilling a role of support and prevention.

==== Psychologists ====
The College has two psychologists who assess the emotional needs of the students. They counsel the students when necessary or refer them to external professionals depending on the needs. They also work on prevention in the topics they find as priorities for the community. Both psychologists live on campus and are also Residence Coordinators. Therefore, they are in close and permanent contact with the students. They are part of the Integrated Health Program.

==== Infirmary ====
The nurse provides the necessary and proper support in physical health. Her job is focused on prevention and intervention. The nurse provides the necessary attention to the students and she refers the students to the doctor when it is deemed necessary. The nurse is part of the Integrated Health Program and also assesses the meals served in the College.

==== Student Services Coordinator ====
This person supports the students in migration matters and coordinates local and international transportation.

==== Emergency Teams ====
Members of these teams are from all the areas of the college, including both students and staff members. They act in case of emergencies. They are trained according to the needs of the program.
