= Tabeer Ki Ghalti =

1963 Urdu book by Wahiduddin Khan

- Author: Wahiduddin Khan
- Language: Urdu
- Genre: Religion
- Published: 1963
- Publisher: Goodwords Books, India
- Publication place: India
- Pages: 344

Tabeer Ki Ghalti (Urdu: تعبیر کی غلطی) is a 1963 Urdu book by Wahiduddin Khan. The book is a critique of Abul A'la Maududi's interpretation of Islam in general and his book Quran Ki Chaar Buniyadi Istlahein in particular. The book was the reason for author's exclusion from Jamat e Islami.

== Background and synopsis ==
=== Dialogues and correspondences ===
Tabeer Ki Ghalti was published in 1963 when the author Maulana Wahiduddin Khan was 38 years old and had been a member of Jamaat-e-Islami Hind for the previous 15 years. The beginning part of the book contains long dialogues and correspondences that happened in 1959-1962 with senior members of the party, namely, Sadruddin Islahi, Jalil Ahsan Nadvi, and Abu al Lais Islahi, where the author discusses his critical questions with them. Later in 1962-63, he corresponded with the founder of the party Abul A'la Maududi to have some answers to his doubts. Maududi's response was:

"... The way you communicate shows that anyone who doesn't accept your point of view is ignorant and unintelligent ... You are speaking from a very lofty position. It seems that you have already made up your mind that what you have written is the final word. In such a case, my opinion is needless. You are free to promote the interpretation of religion that you think is correct."(Tabeer Ki Ghalti, p. 112-136, Goodwords Books, India)

After some correspondence, Maududi refused to engage further in any debate with the author. Finally, Wahiduddin Khan published his critique in August 1963.

=== Critique ===
The later parts of the book present criticism on Maududi's book Quran Ki Chaar Buniyadi Istlahein and his interpretation of Islam as a 'system' rather than a spiritual relation between individual and God. In author's words (trans.):

"The ultimate reality of religion is an inner realization. All we have to reach in this worldly life is to discover God as our true object of worship, to biologically connect with Him, not that we have succeeded in erecting a social structure or we have struggled to establish it. If the situation demands, then the people of faith must also do this work but its status is additional and not real". (Tabeer Ki Ghalti, p. 118, Goodwords Books, India)
