= Jagan Nath Kaul =

Indian humanitarian (1924-2008)

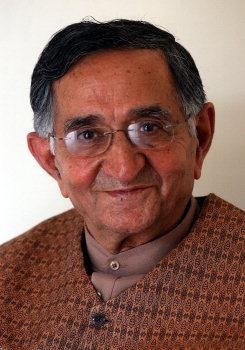
Jaga Nath Kaul

Jagan Nath Kaul (13 October 1924 – 16 December 2008) was the founder, president, and patron of SOS Children's Village of India (SOS CVI). SOS CVI provides a home to almost 15,000 children in 34 children's villages, located in various parts of the country. In addition to the children's villages, SOS provides indirect care to children through its 122 allied projects such as kindergartens, schools and social, medical and vocational training centres throughout India. SOS CVI provides direct and indirect care to almost 200,000 (200,000) children in the country.

== Early life ==
Kaul was born in Srinagar, and his early schooling was in Kashmir. His education continued at the Universities of the Punjab, Rajasthan and Delhi. After completing his master's degree in economics Kaul began his professional career with the city of Delhi, rising to the positions of chief of probation services and assistant director of social welfare. In 1962 he received a Fulbright scholarship, and travelled to the USA for advanced studies in child and youth care at Case Western Reserve University. In 1963 Kaul met Hermann Gmeiner (who was visiting India), and went on to establish SOS Children's Villages of India with the support of Prime Minister Indira Gandhi.

== SOS Children's Village ==
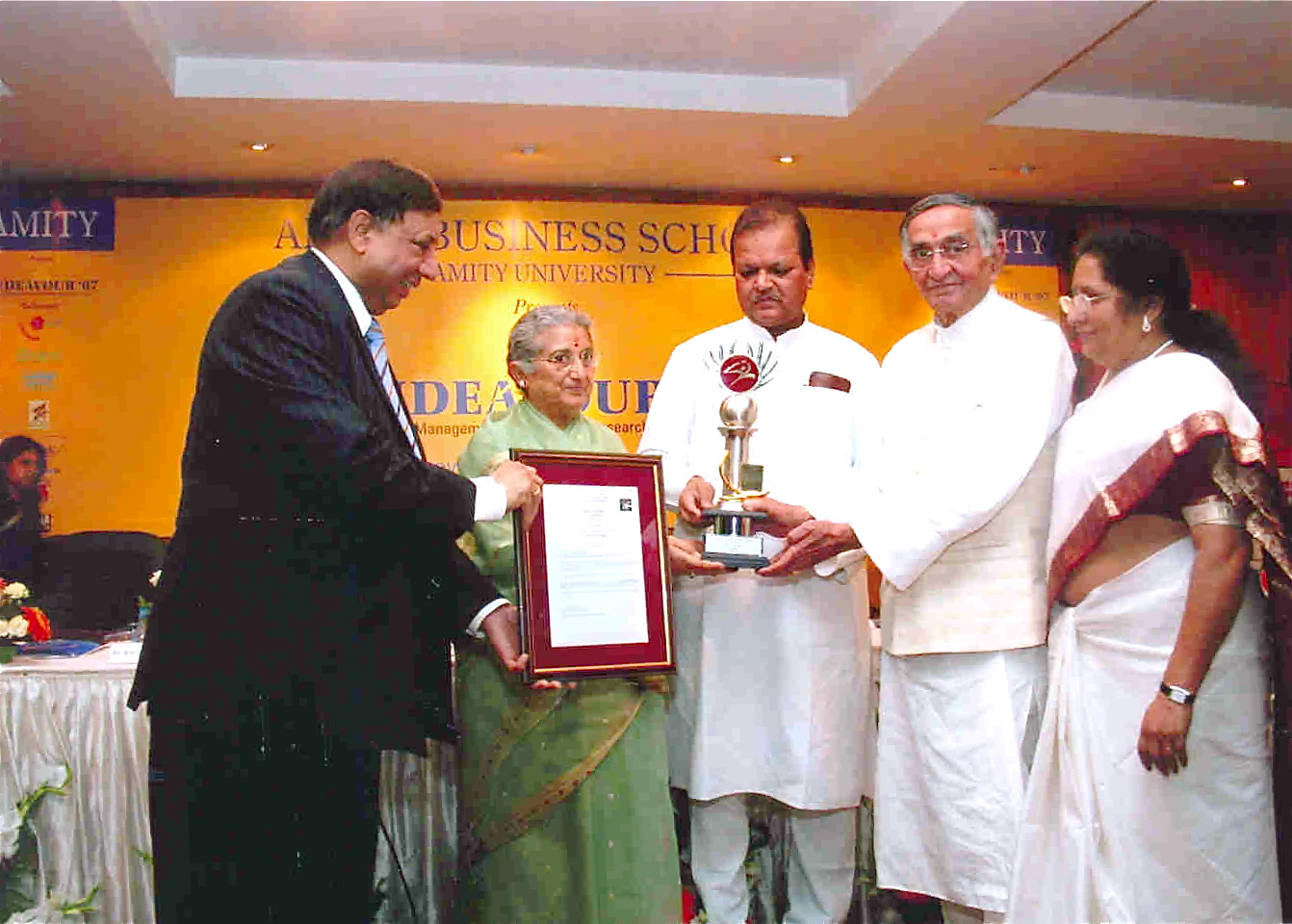
Shrimati and Shri J. N. Kaul

The 1963 meeting between Kaul and Gmeiner (who was visiting India to establish SOS Children's Villages there) was a meeting of the minds. Kaul identified completely with the SOS concept, and agreed to return to India and attempt to set up SOS Children's Villages there. He dedicated the rest of his life to caring for children, starting a movement when he established the first SOS Children's Village at Greenfields in Faridabad in 1968 with the active support of then-Prime Minister Indira Gandhi. The first SOS Children's Village in India Greenfields cared for over 200 children. After that, Kaul's mission was to bring succour to any child suffering due to man-made tragedies or natural disasters.

Kaul was village director of SOS Children's Village Greenfields from its beginning. He hoped to reach out to as many children in India as possible and to establish at least one SOS Children's Village in every province. As of 2011 India has 31 SOS Children's Villages, and 75 other projects. Kaul succeeded in involving thousands of Indians in fulfilling their social responsibilities towards children. A believer in partnership between government and the people, he did not hesitate to demand and stand up for the rights of children.

Kaul served SOS Children's Villages of India in various capacities, first as a village director and rising in position and responsibility as the organisation grew to the position of Secretary-General. From 1989 to July 2007, he was honorary president and patron of the national association. He also served two terms as Senator for SOS-Kinderdorf International. While Kaul received numerous awards for his efforts and commitment to the children of India (and is possibly the most-decorated social worker in India), his favourite reward was being lovingly called Papaji (revered father) by all in the SOS family.

Kaul succeeded in involving thousands of Indians in contributing to the cause of child protection, maintaining: "When we give a child a home, we are expressing our belief in life and the fundamental good in people". He was associated with various government and voluntary agencies involved in child care, in various capacities:

- Senate, SOS Kinderdorf International (Austria)
- Member, Expert Committee for Care and Rehabilitation of Destitute Children (government of India)
- Member Executive Committee, Indian Council for Child Welfare
- Vice President, Association for Social Health in India
- President, Defence for Children International (India)

== Awards ==
Kaul received many awards and honours for his work:

- Gold Medal of Honour: awarded in 1983 by Hermann Gmeiner (president, SOS-Kinderdorf International) at SOS Academy, Innsbruck (Austria) for dedication to the cause of needy children in India
- Appreciation Award: presented in 1983 by the India Sponsorship Committee (Bombay)
- Raja Ram Mohan Roy Teacher's Award (1984)
- SOS Ring: for dedication to the SOS Children's Villages organisation through his life work, loyalty and attachment to the cause of needy children and women
- Bal Sahyog Award (1986): for caring for needy children throughout India
- Appreciation Award (1986): presented at the Symposium on Street Children, sponsored by Hogares Providencia IAP in Mexico
- Rajiv Gandhi Manav Seva Award: presented for service to children on 14 November 1995 by Indian Minister for Human Resource Development Madhav Rao Scindia in New Delhi
- Giani Zail Singh Sadbhawna Award: presented 4 May 1996 in New Delhi
- G. D. Birla Award for Outstanding Contributions to Humanism (1995): presented by Indian Vice-President K. R. Narayanan 22 August 1996
- Shiromani Award (1996): presented for contributions to national development, integration, enrichment of life and outstanding achievements in the chosen field of activity by Lok Sabha Speaker P. A. Sagma 22 February 1997 in New Delhi
- Louis Marchesi Fellow Award: presented by Round Table 28 December 1997
- Secular India Harmony Award (1998): presented by Indian Prime Minister Atal Behari Vajpayee on behalf of the United Children's Movement 12 June 1999
- Rajiv Gandhi National Sadbhavana Award (1998)
- Dadabhai Naoroji New Millennium Award: presented by former Indian Prime Minister H. D. Deve Gowdaor for excellence and achievement 30 June 1999
- Outstanding Individual Award: presented by former Indian President R. Venkataraman on behalf of CASP 2 November 1999
- Padma Shri Award (26 January 2000): Presented by former Indian President K. R. Narayanan 30 March 2000
- Lifetime Award for Social Service: presented 26 May 2000 for Kaul's outstanding contributions by Red & White
- Order of Merit for Management, honoured as Samaj Shri, Man of the Millennium and Gold Medal 2000 for outstanding achievement by Indian Council of Management Executives
- Samaj Ratnakar Award: presented for contributions to peace and social welfare by Sanathan Sansthan, Goa Branch 4 April 2002
- Sewa Nidhi Prateek Chinha: by Ganga Sewa Nidhi, Dashwamedh Varanasi for social service 5 April 2002
- Manav Bhushan Award: by Viklang Samakalan Sansthan for dedication and lifetime contributions 6 April 2002
- Manav Ratnakar Award: for national social contributions by All India Patrakar Kalyan Samiti 6 April 2002
- Sant Samman Award: by Santmat Anuyayee Math Garwaghat 7 April 2002
- S. Ahajanand Samman Award: for work raising the downtrodden, by Sahajanand Vichar Manch 7 April 2002
- Rashtra Gaurav Award: for contributions to different areas of Indian society, by Sant Ravi Das Shiksha Ewam Vikas Sansthan 8 April 2002
- Karamyogi Award: for a special contribution to mainstream society, by Kashi Adyatmik Sanskritik Sewa Samiti 8 April 2002
- Bhagirath Alankaran Award: for contributions in education, social services and human development by Ganga Seva Nidhi Varanasi 19 November 2002
- Manavshri Award: from Sanskar Bharti 2 April 2003
- Swami Ram Award: from the Himalayan Institute Hospital Trust 13 November 2004, for contributions to the economic, environmental, scientific, social and spiritual development of humanity
- Amity Leadership Award for Excellence in Social Welfare (2007)
