= Rajiv Gandhi National Sadbhavana Award =

Indian civilian award

- Civilian award for contributions towards promotion of communal harmony, national integration and peace
- Sponsored by: All India Congress Committee
- Reward: Rs. 10 lakh
- First award: 1992

Rajiv Gandhi National Sadbhavana Award (English: Rajiv Gandhi National Communal Harmony Award) is an Indian award given for outstanding contribution towards promotion of communal harmony, national integration and peace. The award was instituted by All India Congress Committee of the Indian National Congress Party (INC), in 1992 to commemorate the lasting contribution made by the former Prime Minister Rajiv Gandhi, carries a citation and a cash award of Rs. ten lakhs. It is given on 20 August, the birth anniversary of Rajiv Gandhi, which is celebrated as Sadbhavna Diwas (Harmony Day).

== Recipients ==
Former recipients of the award include Mother Teresa, Shenai maestro Ustad Bismillah Khan, Grameen Bank founder Muhammad Yunus of Bangladesh, Former Assam Chief Minister Hiteswar Saikia and freedom fighter Subhadra Joshi (jointly), Lata Mangeshkar, Sunil Dutt, Jagan Nath Kaul and author Kapila Vatsyayan, Wahiuddin Khan(Islamic scholar), Kiran Seth(founder of SPIC MACAY) (2011). Other recipients are civil society activists Teesta Setalvad and Harsh Mander (jointly), S N Subbarao, Swami Agnivesh and Madari Moideen (jointly), former President K R Narayanan, Nirmala Deshpande, Hem Dutta (2007), N Radhakrishnan and Gautam Bhai.

Year	Recipients	Notes
1995	Jagan Nath Kaul	Social activist, Founder of SOS Children's Village of India (SOS CVI)
1996	Lata Mangeshkar	Singer
1998	Sunil Dutt	Actor, Politician, Peace Activist
2000	Kapila Vatsyayan	Scholar
2003	S. N. Subba Rao	Peace Activist
2004	Swami Agnivesh	Social Activist
2006	Nirmala Deshpande	Social Activist
2007	Hem Dutta	Social Activist
2008	N Radhakrishnan	Social Activist
2009	Gautam Bhai	Social Activist
2010	Wahiduddin Khan	Islamic Scholar, Peace Activist
2011	SPIC MACAY	Promotes Indian Classical Music and culture among the youth
2012	D. R. Mehta	Work through Bhagwan Mahaveer Viklang Sahayata Samiti, Jaipur
2013	Amjad Ali Khan	Musician
2014	Muzaffar Ali	Film Maker
2016	Shubha Mudgal	Singer
2017	Mohammad Azharuddin	Former Cricketer
2017	M.Gopala Krishna	Retired IAS Officer
2018	Gopalkrishna Gandhi	Communal Harmony, Peace and Goodwill

== See also ==
- Rajiv Gandhi Khel Ratna
- Indira Gandhi Award for National Integration
