= Saniyasnain Khan =

Indian television host and author

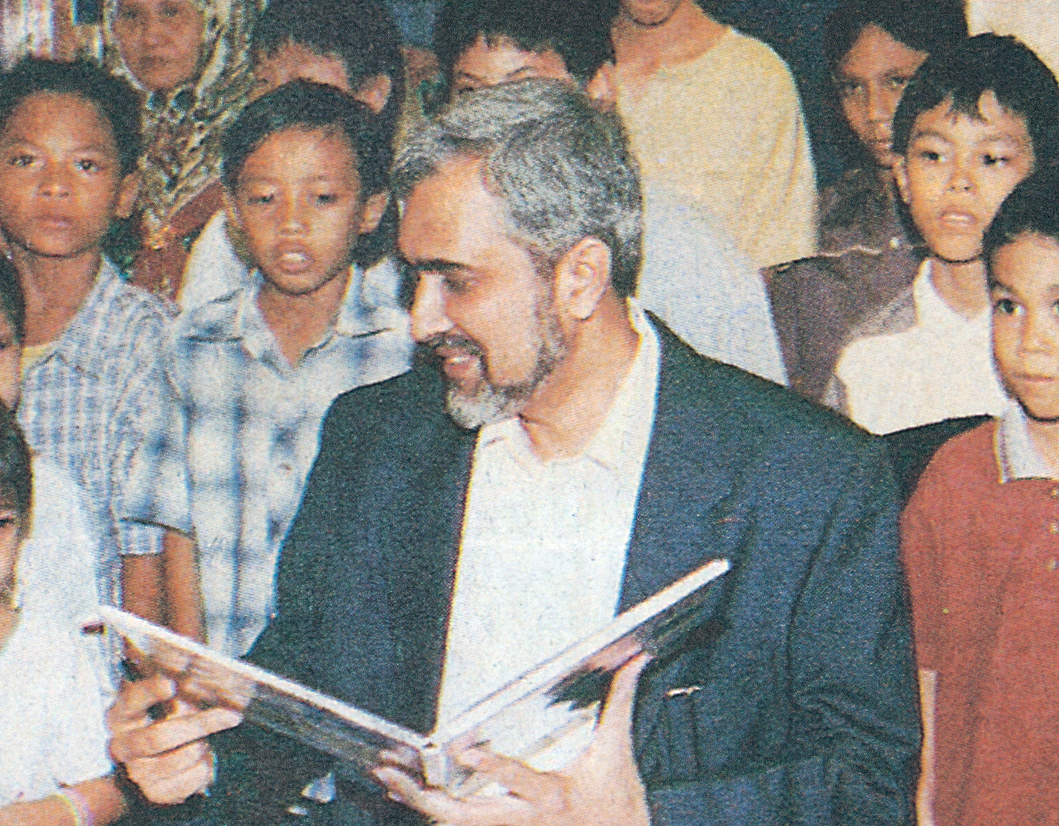
- Saniyasnain Khan in 2003 at the Islamic Arts Museum, Kuala Lumpur.
- Born: 10 December 1959 (age 66); Azamgarh, Uttar Pradesh, India
- Occupation: Author
- Relatives: Wahiduddin Khan (father), Zafarul Islam Khan (brother)
- Writing career
- Genre: Children's literature,
- Notable works: Goodnight Stories from the Quran, Tell Me about the Prophet Muhammad
- Website: www.goodwordbooks.com

Saniyasnain Khan is an Indian television host and children's author of over 100 children's books on Islamic topics. He established Goodword Books in 1999.

He has also created board games for children on Islamic themes. A trustee of the Centre for Peace and Spirituality (CPS International) – a non-profit, non-political organization working towards peace and spirituality, he contributes articles on Islam and spirituality to English newspapers.

He is considered to be among the World's 500 Most Influential Muslims by the George Washington University, USA. His books have been translated into French, German, Italian, Spanish, Dutch, Danish, Polish, Swedish, Bosnian, Norwegian, Russian, Uzbek, Turkish, Arabic, Malay, Thai, Malayalam, Bengali, Urdu, etc.

== Selected works ==
Khan's children's books include:

- Tell Me About Hajj
- Tell Me About the Prophet Yusuf
- The Greatest Stories from the Quran

== See also ==
- List of modern-day Muslim scholars
- Wahiduddin Khan
- Tazkirul Quran
