= Purushottam Yashwant Deshpande =

Indian writer (1899–1896)

Purushottam Yashwant Deshpande (popularly called P.Y. Deshpande, or simply P.Y), (December 1899 – 26, July 1986) was an Indian writer in Marathi. He was awarded the Sahitya Akademi Award for Marathi language in 1962 for his philosophical work Anamikachi Chintanika (Meditations of an anonymous person).

Deshpande was known as a multi-faceted personality, who was at various times a novelist, journalist, political activist and a philosopher and commentator of Indian scriptures, besides being associated with the Krishnamurti school of philosophy. He also served as a member of the Provisional Parliament of India, between 1950 and 1952, representing Madhya Pradesh (which was formed out of the erstwhile Central Provinces and Berar, along with some princely states which acceded to India)

He was the father of Indian social activist and former member of the Upper House of the Indian parliament Nirmala Deshpande. His wife Vimalabai, also a poet, was a minister (parliamentary secretary) of Central Provinces and Berar, under the premiership of Ravishankar Shukla, at the time of Indian independence in 1947.

== Early life ==
Deshpande was born in December 1899 in the town of Amravati, in the erstwhile Berar region in Central India (also known as Vidarbha). He was born the third son of Y.G. Deshpande, a prominent lawyer and a local aristocratic landowner.

After completing his matriculation in 1917, Deshpande enrolled at Fergusson College at Pune, for his B.A. During this period, he gained his first exposure to political activism. During his student years, Deshpande was taken by concepts such as rationalism and liberal humanism, and was inspired by English romantic poets like Robert Browning and P.B. Shelley. He was also influenced deeply by the Russian Revolution. India of the early 1920s was also infected by revolutionary fervor against the British Raj, following several events including the deeply unpopular Rowlatt Act, and the infamous Jallianwala Bagh massacre. Mahatma Gandhi had launched one of his first Satyagraha campaigns in the form of the Non-cooperation movement. Deshpande actively participated in the movement, suspending his studies in the fourth year of his course. He was briefly imprisoned, and completed his B.A. post his release from jail

He went on to complete his M.A from the Bombay University in 1925, and his L.L.B from Nagpur University in 1931, and briefly practiced law under his father.

== Political career ==
In 1929, Deshpande joined the Indian Civil Service , specifically attached to the Judicial Services of what was then the Berar Division. However, his stint was short-lived, and he quit his post by 1931, unable to tolerate what he saw was a high-handed attitude from his superiors in the judicial service.

The very same year, he formally joined an organization of freedom fighters called the Berar Youth League. Persuaded by Waman Gopal Joshi, who was then the regional president of the Berar Congress Committee, affiliated with the Indian National Congress, he joined active politics. When Gandhi launched the Salt March in 1930, the Berar Congress Committee organized symbolic protests in Akola, before launching a war council at Nagpur to create a broader appeal for a Satyagraha in the region. Deshpande was among the several prominent people recruited to mobilize public opinion for the protests. Deshpande also found cause with the local peasants struggle. Berar was affected by a severe famine, during this period and Deshpande also agitated for famine relief and revenue exemption, which led to a brief imprisonment in 1932. Connecting these struggles with his readings of the philosophies of Marx, Engels and Lenin he started shifting towards communism. His novel Vishal Jeevan, published in 1933 dealt with the farmer's cause and his growing attraction towards communism.

He joined the Indian National Trade Union Congress, and became active in organizing labour strikes in the Nagpur region. In 1934, he shifted to Nagpur, and joined the Nagpur bar and also briefly accepted a position as a lecturer at the Nagpur University Law College. He started a weekly Marathi magazine called Bhavitavya (The Future), that was intended as a platform of Communist ideas. This brought him in close contact with many leftist politicians in the Congress pantheon like Jayaprakash Narayan, Ram Manohar Lohia, Achyut Patwardhan, Minoo Masani and Yusuf Meherally among others. These contacts and inspirations he derived from Marxist literature, led him to drift away from Gandhian ideology that informed the political positions of the mainstream Congress party. He became one of the founding members of the Congress Socialist Party, a socialist caucus within the Congress party and was one of the elected members of its first executive committee.

== Bibliography ==
=== Collection of Poems in Marathi ===
- Nirmalya Mala (1926)

=== Marathi Novels ===
- Bandhanacbya Palikade (Beyond the Bondage) (1927)
- Sukalele Phool (The Faded Flower) (1931)
- Sadaphuli (Ever Blossoming) (1933)
- Vishal Jeevan (Large Life) (1939)
- Kali Rani (Black Queen) (1940)
- Nave Jag (New Place) (1941)
- Ahuti (Sacrifice) (1959)
- Bherigosh Ki Dharmakosh (Bugle of War or a Treatise of Dharma) (1972)
- Amulagra (Radical) (1978)

=== Essays and Commentaries in Marathi ===
- Anamikachi Chintanika (1961)
- Nasadiya Sukta Neerajan (1958)
- Anubhawamrit Rasarahasya - Volumes 1 to 3 (1962-1965)
- Saptashloki Bhagwat (1960)
- Manavopanishad (1977)
- Khara Patanjal Yoga (1979)
- Nityanutan Bhagwadgita ani Jeevan Darshan (1986)

=== Works in English ===
- Jnanadeva (1973), a biography on the thirteenth-century Marathi saint Jnanadeva
- The Authentic Yoga (1978), a treatise on the Yoga Sutras of Patanjali
- Tathagata Buddha (1984), a novel on the life of the Buddha
