= Centre for Peace and Spirituality =

Centre for Peace and Spirituality (CPS International)
- Formation: 2001
- Headquarters: New Delhi
- Founder: Maulana Wahiduddin Khan
- Website: www.cpsglobal.org

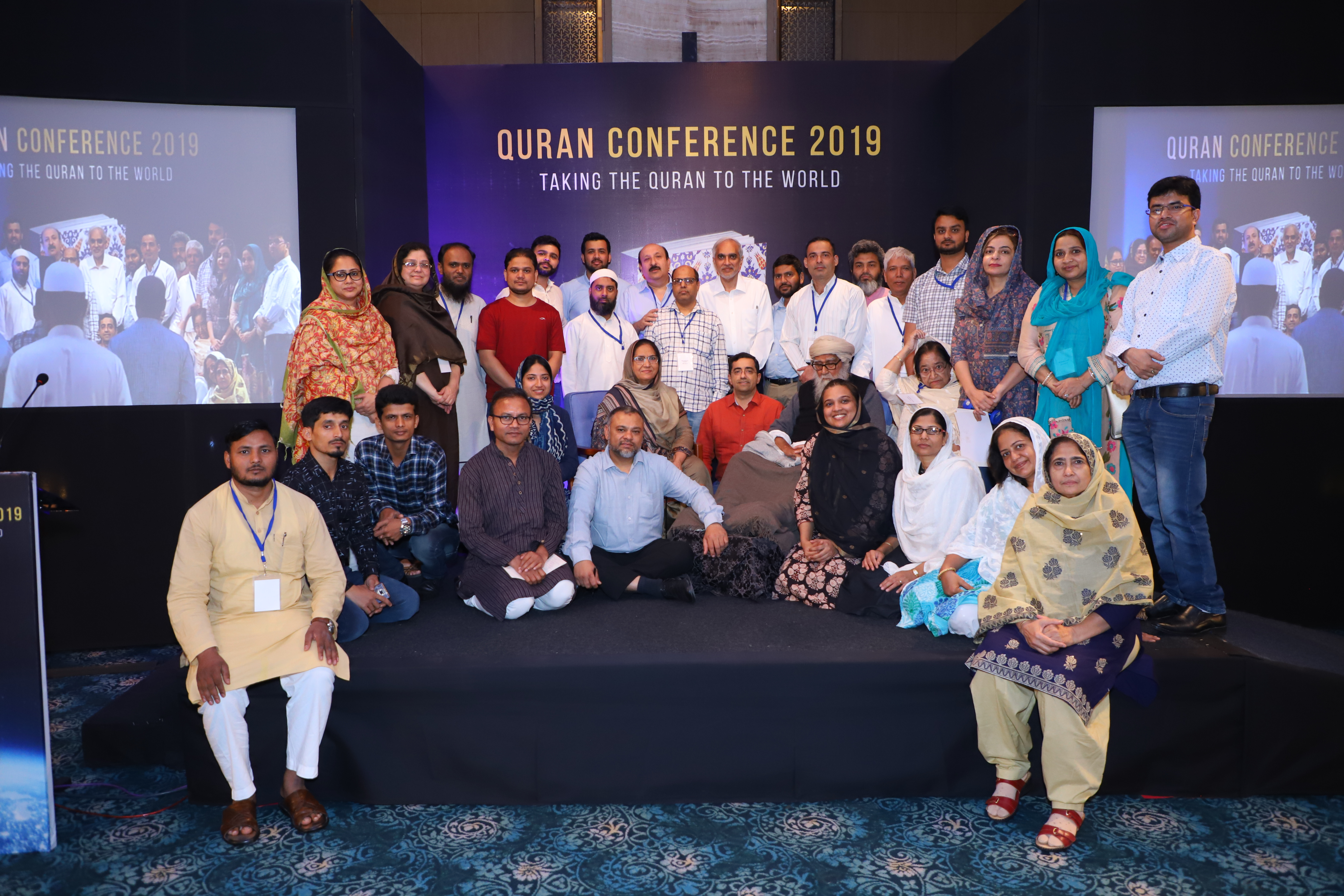
Members of CPS International with founder Wahiduddin Khan at 2019 Quran Conference, New Delhi

The Centre (also spelled 'Center') for Peace and Spirituality International (CPS International) was founded by Maulana Wahiduddin Khan in 2001 (New Delhi) to promote interfaith dialogue and reinforce the culture of peace. CPS International is said to encourage its member to become 'ambassadors of peace' by promoting positivity and interfaith dialogue.

The organization website says CPS International draws inspiration from the Quran and Sunnah and seeks to share the spiritual principles of Islam with the world. CPS International, with the support of Goodword Books, is also a global distributor of Quran translations.

== Maulana Wahiduddin Khan ==
Maulana Wahiduddin Khan (1925–2021) promoted inter-faith dialogue and harmony. He believed in the power of dialogue and believed conversation between religious leaders has to be based on mutual respect. Khan was prolific writer and was awarded the Padma Vibhushan, India's second-highest civilian award, for his contributions towards peace and spirituality.

== Notable members ==
- Wahiduddin Khan, Founder
- Saniyasnain Khan, Trustee and Secretary
- Rajat Malhotra, International Global Coordinator
- Prof. Farida Khanam, Chairperson
- Dr Maria Khan, Affiliated with CPS Global
