= Béatrice von Boch-Galhau =

German entrepreneur

Béatrice von Boch-Galhau (née Béatrice Dodd; born 1 August 1914 in Wentorf bei Hamburg; died 13 March 2011 in Mettlach) was a German entrepreneur and patron, especially for the SOS Children's Villages (SOS Villages d'Enfants).

== Early life and education ==
Béatrice Dodd, the daughter of British merchant Arthur Edgar Dodd and his wife Emilia (née Tiefenbacher), was born in Wentorf bei Hamburg, near Hamburg.

In September 1935, she married Luitwin von Boch-Galhau (1906-1988), director-general of Villeroy & Boch since 1932, and minority shareholder.

They had five children between 1936 and 1949 including Luitwin Gisbert von Boch-Galhau and Milicent Princess zu Solms-Hohensolms-Lich.

== Career ==
Luitwin von Boch-Galhau lead Villeroy & Boch through an unprecedented rise to become one of the 100 largest German companies. The company turned over DM 579 million in 1970. Luitwin von Boch Galhau became the largest shareholder of V & B over the years.

Béatrice von Boch-Galhau was involved in life for orphaned children. She was the initiator in 1957 and in 1959 the founder of the SOS Children's Village Saar in Merzig.

== Distinctions ==
- Germany: First Class of the Order of Merit of the Federal Republic of Germany (16 September 1969)
- Holy See: Grand Officer of the Order of the Holy Sepulchre
  - Grand Prior of the German Lieutenancy by Lorenz Cardinal Jaeger in the Cologne Cathedral (5 December 1970)
  - Previously Dame by Cardinal Grand Master Eugène Cardinal Tisserant (1970)
