= Nirmala Deshpande =

Indian social activist (1929-2008)

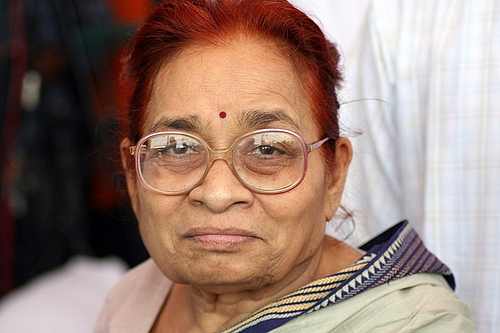
- Nirmala Deshpande
- Born: 17 October 1929; Nagpur, Maharashtra, India
- Died: 1 May 2008 (aged 78)
- Known for: Social activism

Member of Parliament, Rajya Sabha
- In office 27 August 1997 – 26 August 1999
- In office 24 June 2004 – 1 May 2008 (her death)
- Constituency: Nominated

Nirmala Deshpande (17 October 1929 – 1 May 2008) was a noted Indian social activist who had embraced Gandhi and philosophy. She devoted her adult life to the promotion of communal harmony and service to women, tribal people, and the dispossessed in India.

She was awarded Padma Vibhushan, the second highest civilian award of India in 2006. and was awarded Sitara-e-Imtiaz posthumously by Pakistan in 2010

== Early life and family ==
Deshpande was born to Vimala (विमला) and the Marathi writer Purushottam Yashwant Deshpande (पुरुषोत्तम यशवंत देशपांडे) in Nagpur on 19 October 1929. Her father was the recipient of a Sahitya Akademi Award in 1962 for his work in Marathi Anamikachi Chintanika (अनामिकाची चिंतनिका).

She did MA in political science from Nagpur, India, She also studied Fergusson College, Pune. Thereafter, she served as lecturer in political science in Morris College, Nagpur.

== Social activities ==
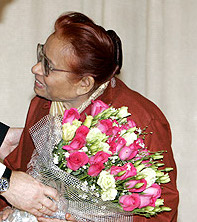
Nirmala Desphande in 2007

Deshpande joined Vinoba Bhave's Bhoodan movement in 1952. She undertook a 40,000-km journey on foot --padayatra—across India to carry Gandhi's message of Grām Swarāj. She recognized that it was difficult to practice Gandhian principles, yet believed that doing so was the only way towards a truly democratic society.

Deshpande was known to be the spirit behind peace marches in Punjab and Kashmir when violence was at its peak in those states. Her peace mission to Kashmir in 1994 and her initiative in organizing India-Pakistan meet in 1996 were her two major public service achievements. The Tibetan cause against Chinese suppression was also close to her heart.

She served as the president of a historical organization i.e. Harijan Sevak Sangh from June 1983 to till her death. She was involved or associated with many other social organizations and bodies. And also, she founded Akhil Bharat Rachnatmak Samaj that won the National Communal Harmony Award in 2004.

In 2006, Deshpande championed clemency for Afzal Guru, who had been convicted of a terrorist attack on Indian Parliament in 2001. (The attack had resulted in the death of 13 people.)

Deshpande visited many cities in the United States of America on a tour organized by a prominent Indian American from Lansing, Michigan in the last few years of her life. She was member of a Rajya Sabha, when she died in her sleep in the early hours of 1 May 2008, in New Delhi at the age of 79.

She continually worked for harmony between India and Pakistan. Even her mortal remains were immersed in Indus river of Sindh province in Pakistan.

== Authorship ==
Deshpande authored several novels in Hindi, "Seemant", on the theme of women's liberation, and "Chimlig", based on Chinese cultural ethos, (one of which got a national award), some plays, and travelogues. She also wrote a commentary on Isha Upanishad and a biography of Vinoba Bhave.

She also founded the magazine Nityanutan and started its publishing in 1985. This magazine was dedicated to world peace and nonviolence and was one of the most effective magazines carrying thoughts of nonviolence and peace. After her death, the magazine is being published every month through crowdfunding by one of her close associates Ram Mohan Rai, a social activist from Panipat (Haryana).

== Honors ==
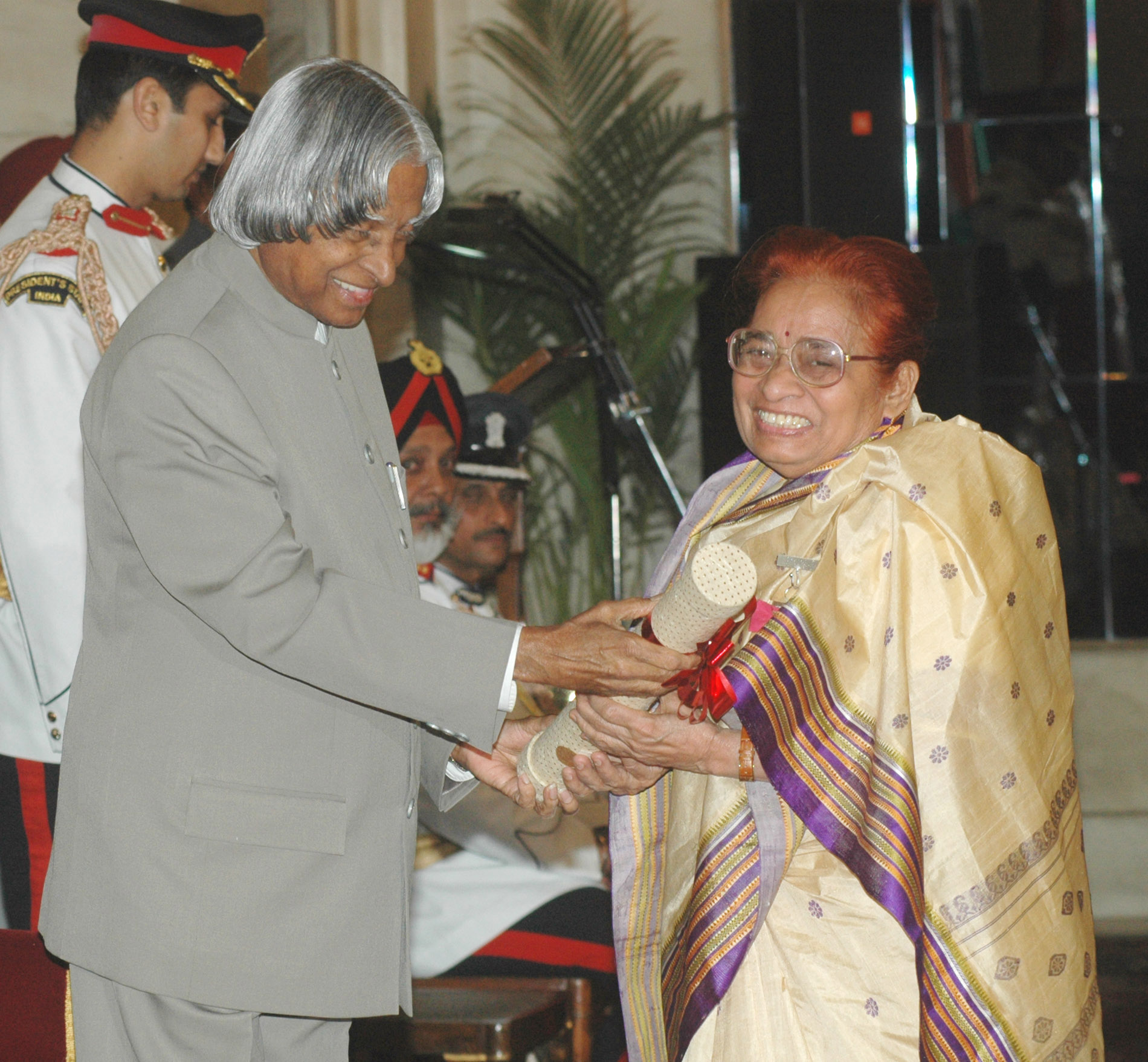
The President, Dr. A.P.J. Abdul Kalam presenting the Padma Vibhushan Award – 2006 to Dr. (Ms.) Nirmala Deshpande, in New Delhi on March 20, 2006

Deshpande was a nominated member of Indian Rajya Sabha two times during August 1997- August 1997 and during 24 June 2004 to 2010. Her name was considered for the Indian Presidential position in 2007.

Deshpande received the Rajiv Gandhi National Sadbhavana Award (2005) and the Padma Vibhushan title in 2006. She was a nominee for the Nobel Peace Prize in 2005.

Nirmala Deshpande ji also received first Banarsi Das Gupta "Rashtra Gaurav Puraskar" on 5 November 2007 in a function, present to her by Vice President of India Sh. Mohammad Hamid Ansari. in the presence of Smt. Sonia Gandhi (President UPA), Sh. Pawan Bansal (Cabinet Minister), Sh. Shriprakash Jaiswal (Minister of State), Sh. Bhupinder Singh Hooda (Chief Minister of Haryana), Sh. Santosh Bagrodia (Minister of State), Sh. Deepender Singh Hooda (Member of Parliament), Sh. Naveen Jindal (Member of Parliament), Sh. Ajay Gupta and many other VIPs at Balyogi Hall, Parliament of India, New Delhi.

She was conferred the Sitara-i-Imtiaz, one of Pakistan's third highest civilian honors, on 13 August 2009; the eve of Pakistan's Independence Day.

On her name, a small museum was established in Panipat (Haryana) with efforts of Ram Mohan Rai. This museum is like an honor and tribute and includes her belongings.
