= The Milli Gazette =

Indian English-language compact newspaper

- May 2010 Second Fortnight Front Page of The Milli Gazette
- Type: Online Newspaper, previously a Fortnightly newspaper
- Owner: Pharos Group
- Publisher: Pharos Media
- Editor-in-chief: Zafarul Islam Khan
- Founded: January 2000
- Language: English
- Headquarters: New Delhi, India
- ISSN: 0972-3366
- OCLC number: 54467165
- Website: www.milligazette.com

The Milli Gazette is an Indian English language digital news publication (formerly a fortnightly compact newspaper) based in Delhi. Founded in January 2000, the publication describes itself as the Indian Muslims' Leading News Source. In 2008, it started its e-paper publication.

The Guardian, a British daily while quoting Gazette editor, Zafarul Islam Khan, described the Milli Gazette as "a newspaper widely read among India's 140m Muslims" and "an influential newspaper for Indian Muslims."' The Diplomat and The Citizen described the publication as the first English language Muslim newspaper of India.

With its 1–15 January 2010 edition, Milli Gazette completed its 10th year in publication. In 2011, Indian Express reported that the Milli Gazette is frequently cited by media houses on stories related to Indian Muslims.

== Closure of print publication ==
In March 2016, the paper published a story titled We don’t recruit Muslims: AYUSH Ministry by journalist Pushp Sharma. The story – based on replies to RTI queries sent to the Ministry of Ayush pertaining to recruitment of Muslim yoga teachers and trainers – alleged that the Ministry did not recruit Muslims "as per government policy". The ministry sent a letter to the Kotla Mubarakpur police station seeking an FIR against Sharma and the newspaper. In May 2016 the paper was issued a show-cause notice based on a complaint by Sharma alleging the publication of misinformation. Sharma denied filing such a complaint. The show-cause notice was withdrawn in 2019 – three years after filing. Editor Zafarul Islam Khan says that this "fiasco" accompanied by financial troubles led to the closure of the print publication at the end of 2016, retaining only its digital version.

Speaking to The Caravan about the stigma of having a primarily Muslim audience, Khan said "The Hindu community and Hindu businessmen did not advertise with us at all" and that the Muslims who are in a position to advertise did not do so because of the fear of being persecuted by authorities.

== Notable contributors ==
- Asghar Ali Engineer
- Balraj Puri
- Faisal Kutty
- Nilofar Suhrawardy
- Ram Puniyani
