= Mazhab Aur Jadeed Challenge =

1966 Urdu book by Waheeduddin Khan

- Author: Wahiduddin Khan
- Language: Urdu
- Genre: Islamic theology
- Published: 1966
- Publisher: Maktaba Al-Risala, New Delhi
- Publication place: India
- Pages: 220

Mazhab Aur Jadeed Challenge (Urdu: مذہب اور جدید چیلنج) is a 1966 Urdu book by Wahiduddin Khan on the topic of Islam and science. The book has been translated into several major languages of the world. The Arabic translation Al Islam Yatahadda has been included in the curriculum of several universities in the Arabic world.

== Synopsis ==
Mazhab Aur Jadeed Challenge deals with the issue of apparent conflict between religion and modern science. The author has divided the book into ten chapters. In the first chapter, the case of the opponents of religion is presented and in the second chapter, the claims against religion are scrutinized by the author. The following eight chapters talk about the basic concepts of religion in a positive way, namely the existence of God, prophethood, and life after death.
