= Quran Ki Chaar Buniyadi Istlahein =

1944 Urdu book by Abul A'la Maududi

- Author: Abul A'la Maududi
- Language: Urdu
- Genre: Islamic theology
- Published: 1944
- Publisher: Islamic Publications (private) Limited, Lahore
- Publication place: British India, Pakistan
- Media type: Hardcover
- Pages: 136

Quran Ki Chaar Buniyadi Istlahein (Urdu: قرآن کی چار بنیادی اصطلاحیں; English trans:Four Key Concepts of the Qur'an) is a 1944 Urdu Islamic book by Abul A'la Maududi. The book is considered to have fundamental importance in the religious thoughts of the author which present Islam as a comprehensive system of life.

== Synopsis ==
Quran Ki Chaar Buniyadi Istlahein describes the four Arabic terms which are frequently mentioned in Quran as a key to understand the holy book; Elah, Rab, Ibadat, and Deen. The authors unfolds meanings of the terms in their full literal and Shariah context.

== Criticism ==
The book has been criticized for giving birth to so-called political Islam. In his 1963 Urdu book "Taebeer Ki Ghalti" (The Error of Interpretation), the Islamic scholar Wahiduddin Khan accused the author of presenting his own self-created meanings of the Arabic terms that are not found in writings of conventional academics and mainstream commentators. Another scholar Abul Hasan Ali Hasani Nadwi, in his 1978 Urdu book "Asar e Hazir Mein Deen Ki Tafheem o Tashreeh", also criticized the interpretations described in Maududi's Quran Ki Chaar Buniyadi Istlahein.

== Ban ==
Quran Ki Chaar Buniyadi Istlahein is one of 20 books of Maududi that were banned in Saudi Arabia in 2015 by the Saudi Ministry of Education.
