= Dereje Wordofa =

Ethiopian humanist, social policy analyst and United Nations diplomat

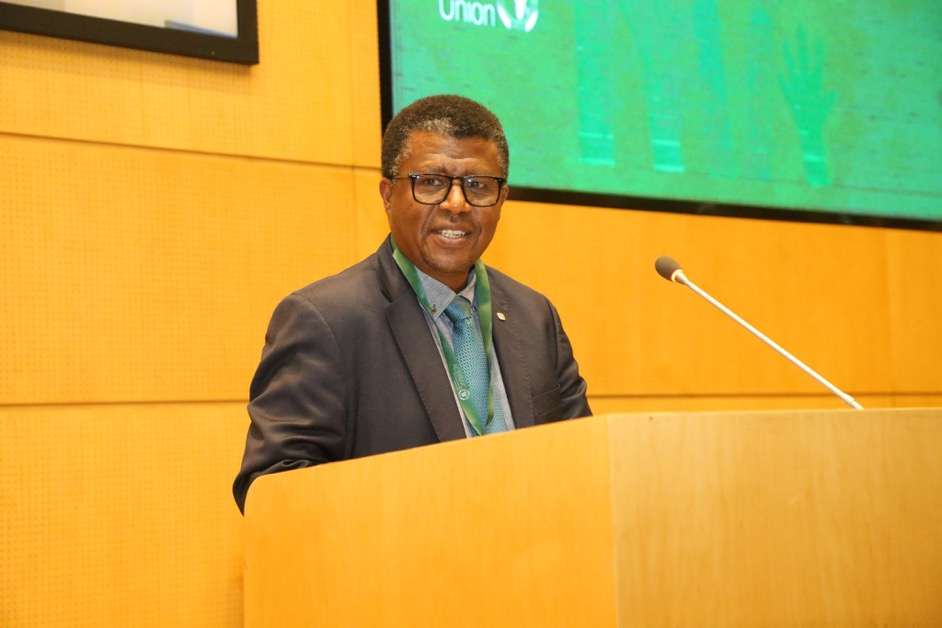
- Dereje Wordofa at the African Union in November 2023

4th President of SOS Children's Villages
- Incumbent
- Assumed office 24 June 2021
- Preceded by: Siddhartha Kaul

UNASG and DED (programs) for UNFPA
- In office 12 April 2018 – 11 November 2020
- Preceded by: Natalia Kanem
- Succeeded by: Diene Keita

Regional Director for Africa, American Friends Service Committee (AFSC)
- In office October 2005 – August 214

Personal details
- Born: 1 February
- Education: Addis Ababa University, London School of Economics, Oxford Brookes University, University of Bradford
- Website: Personal website

Dereje Wordofa Gidda DBA (born February 1) is an Ethiopian humanist, development expert, social policy analyst and United Nations diplomat. He currently serves as the 4th and first African president of SOS Children's Villages - the world's largest non-profit organization focused on catering for children without parental care. Previously, he served as assistant secretary-general and deputy executive director for the United Nations Population Fund, based in New York, head of regional policy at Oxfam based in Oxford and deputy program director of Save the Children UK. Wordofa holds doctorate degree in business administration (DBA) from University of Bradford.

== Early life and education ==
Dereje Wordofa was born in Ethiopia to Haregewoin Beyene Zemariam (mother) and Wordofa Gidda Degefa (father). He Attended Hailemariam Mamo School in Debre Berhan for his high school education before proceeding to Addis Ababa University where he earned a bachelor's degree in business management. He obtained an MSc in social policy planning in developing countries from the London School of Economics in 1996 and an MBA from Oxford Brookes University in 2013. From 2014 to 2021, he studied for a doctor in business administration at the University of Bradford.

== Career ==
Wordofa spent a decade of his early career working for Save the Children (UK) in Ethiopia. He had a stint at the American Friends Service Committee as a regional director for Africa where he formulated public policy and developed comprehensive advocacy strategy. He was Oxfam country representative in Uganda and later became head of regional policy based in Oxford. In this position, he coordinated the organisation's programmes liaised with government, non-governmental organisations and donors and provided strategic leadership to regional policy advisors of Oxfam.

In 2014, he joined SOS Children's Villages – an international nonprofit organization focused on helping children without parental care as an international director for Eastern and Southern African region and later became deputy chief operating officer for Africa and the Middle East where he improved programme quality and child safeguarding in the regions. He left SOS Children's Villages to join United Nations as an assistant secretary general and deputy executive director of the United Nations Population Fund (UNFPA), April 2018. In this position, Wordofa promoted UNFPA global programmes on sexual reproductive health and rights and represented the UN Secretary General at engagements with heads of government of member states and other partners advocating for action on the Sustainable Development Goals. He held talks with Republic of Djibouti president Ismail Omar Guelleh, President of Sierra Leone, Julius Maada Bio, President of Ghana, Nana Akufo-Addo, Prime Ministers of Morocco, and Yemen reinforcing UNFPA policy on inclusion of women in politics, social and economic integration, campaign against Female Genital Mutilation (FGM) protection and promotion of child's rights.

Wordofa returned to SOS Children's Villages in 2021. He contested for the presidency of the organization and won. He is the first African and the 4th president of the organization's over 70 years of history as of the time of his election in June 2021. In this position, he met with several leaders including presidents of Cape Verde José Maria Neves, former Prime Minister of Cambodia Hun Sen and President Sahle-Work Zewde of the Democratic Republic of Ethiopia.

== Advocacy ==
Wordofa advocates for children's rights, youth development, humanitarian assistance, pan-African affairs, and sustainable international development. His interest in social justice began at a young age when he witnessed the hardships faced by people affected by famine and protracted armed conflicts. His advocacy for children's rights focuses on those living in abject poverty and without parental care or family support. During his tenure at the United Nations, SOS Children's Villages International, and other international organizations, he engaged governments and civil society organizations to collaborate in enacting laws that safeguard children's rights and young people's sexual and reproductive health, and to establish well-funded child welfare systems to support the most vulnerable children.

Wordofa's humanitarian efforts and advocacy on poverty alleviation are centered on de-escalating communal conflicts and civil and interstate wars in Africa, which he identifies as major obstacles to achieving the African Millennium Development Goals (MDGs). He frequently spoke about gender equity and ending violence against women and girls. In his writings on Africa and sustainable development, Wordofa argues that inter-governmental partnerships and economic alliances with developed economies are the most viable options for African development. He contends that these approaches are preferable to reliance on Western-controlled institutions such as the International Monetary Fund (IMF) and the World Bank, which often impose conditions akin to neo-colonialism.

== Personal life ==
Wordofa is married to Tigist Gedlu Hailemariam and has two daughters.
