= Tazkirul Quran =

Commentary on the Qur'an by Wahiduddin Khan

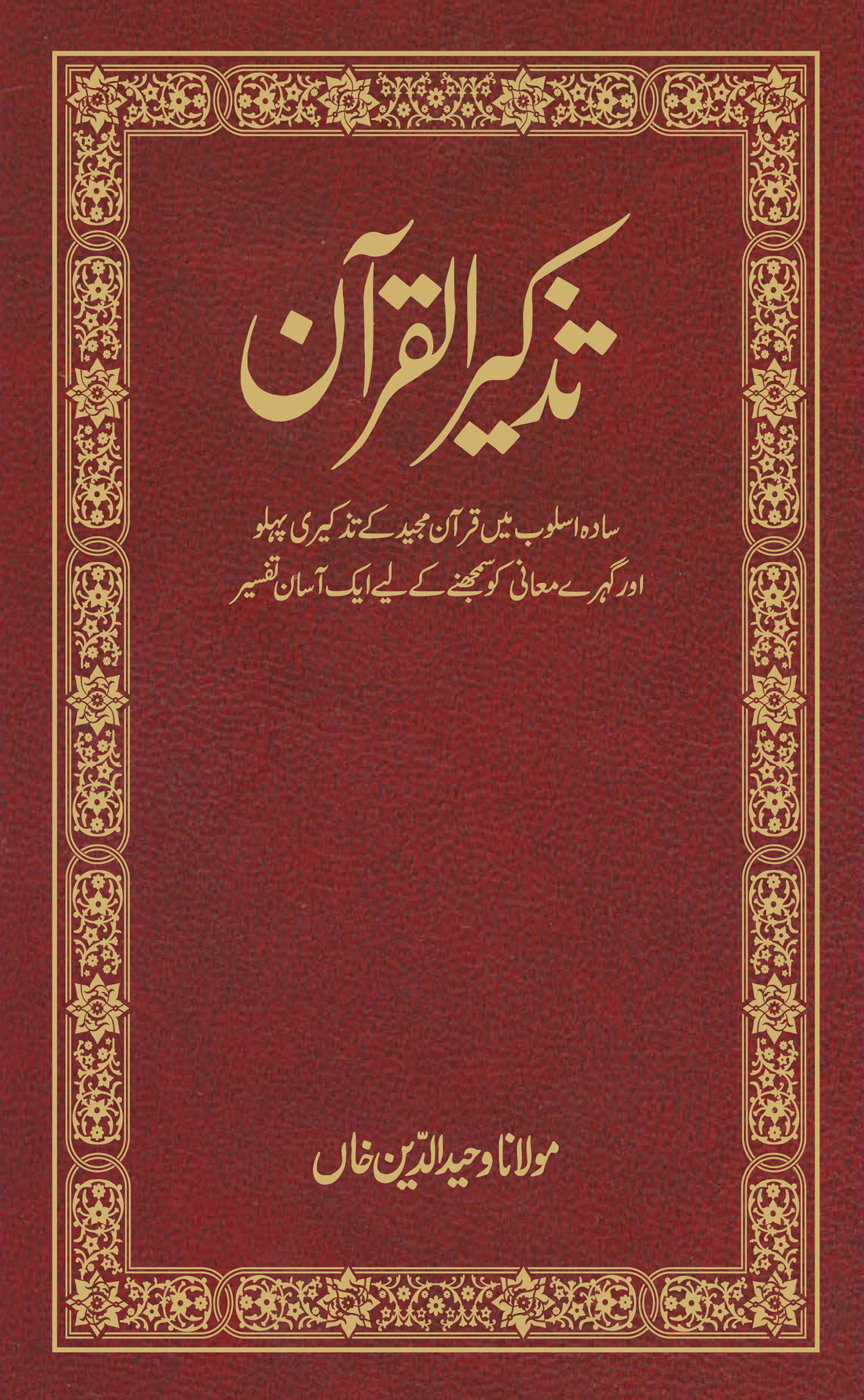
- Tazkirul Quran Urdu
- Author: Maulana Wahiduddin Khan
- Original title: تذکر القرآن
- Translator: Maulana Wahiduddin Khan
- Language: Urdu
- Subject: Quranic commentary
- Genre: Islamic literature
- Publisher: Goodword Books
- Publication date: 1985 (Urdu), 2008 (Arabic), 2011 (English)
- Publication place: India
- Media type: Print (Hardcover, Paperback)
- ISBN: 9789663351629

Tazkirul Quran is an Urdu translation and commentary on the Qur'an, written by Maulana Wahiduddin Khan, in 1985. First published in Arabic in 2008 from Cairo as al-Tadhkir al-Qawim fi Tafsir al-Quran al-Hakim, the work has also been translated into Hindi and English. The English version was published by Goodword Books in 2011 as The Quran Translation and Commentary with Parallel Arabic Text.

== Background ==
Maulana Wahiduddin Khan, born in 1925 at Azamgarh in India, was an Islamic spiritual scholar who was well versed in both classical Islamic learning and modern science. The mission of his life from a very early stage has been the establishment of worldwide peace, to which end he has devoted much time and effort to the development of a complete ideology of peace and non-violence based on the teachings of the Quran. Maulana Wahiduddin Khan's English translation of the Quran is widely acknowledged as simple, clear and easy-to-read.

== Themes ==
According to the Maulana, the holy Qur'an, the central religious text of Islam, which Muslims believe to be a revelation from God (Arabic: الله, Allah)., stresses the importance of man's discovery of truth at the level of realization. Its objective is to explain God's Creation plan, i.e. why God created this world; the purpose of settling man on earth, what is required from man in his pre-death life span, and how his life's record will determine what the post-death period will bring reward or punishment. The Qur'an thus serves to guide man on his entire journey through life into the after-life. The main themes of the Qur'an, clearly set forth in the present translation and commentary of the Qur'an, are enlightenment, peace and closeness to God. To enable the reader to discover God at a purely intellectual level, the Qur'an emphasizes tawassum, tadabbur, and tafakkur - reflection, thinking and contemplation on the signs of God throughout the world.

== See also ==
- Maulana Wahiduddin Khan
- Saniyasnain Khan
