= Wahiduddin Khan =

Indian Islamic scholar (1925–2021)

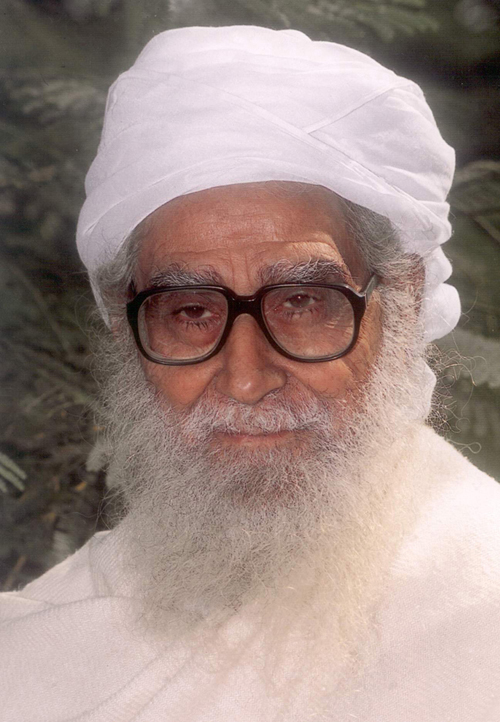
- Born: 1 January 1925; Azamgarh, United Provinces of Agra and Oudh, British India
- Died: 21 April 2021 (aged 96); New Delhi, Delhi, India
- Resting place: Panjpeeran Qabristan, near Basti Hazrat Nizamuddin, New Delhi
- Citizenship: India
- Occupations: Islamic Scholar, Islamic Spiritual Leader, Speaker and Author
- Spouse: Sabi'a Khatoon
- Children: 7, including Zafarul Islam Khan; Farida Khanam; Saniyasnain Khan
- Writing career
- Language: Urdu, English, Hindi, Punjabi
- Genre: Islamic literature
- Notable work: Tazkirul Quran
- Notable awards: Padma Vibhushan
- Website: www.maulanawahiduddinkhan.com

Wahiduddin Khan (1 January 1925 – 21 April 2021), known with the honorific "Maulana", was an Indian Islamic scholar and peace activist and author known for having written a commentary on the Quran and having translated it into contemporary English. He was listed in "the 500 Most Influential Muslims" of the world. He was also the founder of the Centre for Peace and Spirituality (CPS). In 1993, he asked the Muslims to relinquish claims over Babri Masjid site. Khan had also embarked on a peace march through Maharashtra along with Sushil Kumar (Jain monk) and Chidanand Saraswati post the demolition of the Babri Masjid. Khan wrote over 200 books on several aspects of Islam and established the Centre for Peace and Spirituality to promote interfaith dialogue.

Khan received the Demiurgus Peace International Award, and India's third-highest civilian honour, the Padma Bhushan, in January 2000; the National Citizens' Award, presented by Mother Teresa and the Rajiv Gandhi National Sadbhavana Award (2009). He was awarded the Padma Vibhushan, India's second-highest civilian honour, in January 2021. He died in Delhi from COVID-19 complications in April 2021 at the age of 96.

== Early life and education ==
Khan was born a family of Pathan landlords in Village Badharia, in district Azamgarh, United Provinces of Agra and Oudh (present day Uttar Pradesh), India in 1925. Khan lost his father at the age of four and was raised by his mother Zaibunnisa and his uncle, Sufi Abdul Hamid Khan. He received his education at a traditional seminary, Madrastaul Islahi, in Sarai Mir (Azamgarh) in 1938. Khan spent six years completing his alim course and graduated in 1944.

He was also a member of the central Majlis-e-Shura of Jamaat-e-Islami, but due to ideological differences, he withdrew from the party in 1963 and published his critique under the name of Tabir Ki Ghalti (Error Of Interpretation). He was married to Sabi'a Khatoon.

== Jamaat-e Islami ==
His commitment to the Jamaat helped him move up the Jama'at's hierarchy. He was appointed, in a few years after, as a member of its Central Committee. He wrote regularly for the Jama'at's Urdu journal. Khan did not remain for long with the Jama'at, as he thought that the Jama'at's agenda was not only impractical but not in keeping with what Islam expected of the Muslims of India. He came to the conclusion that the Jama'at-e Islami's political approach was ill-suited to the needs and conditions of the Muslim minority in India. He began airing his differences with the Jama'at's ideology and policies even while still a senior leader of the Jama'at, but as these differences began to grow, he decided to quit the organisation in 1962 after serving it for ten years.

== Works ==
Khan founded the Quran Foundation (under the aegis of CPS International) on 2 April 2015. The aim of the foundation was to translate and disseminate copies of the Quran and Islamic material globally by promoting religious understanding amongst people to reveal 'as it is’ as a religion of peace.

He established the Islamic Centre in New Delhi in 1970. In 2001, Khan established the 'Centre for Peace and Spirituality’.

Khan launched the 'Maulana Wahiduddin Khan Peace Foundation.'

== Thoughts and ideology ==
=== Islam an ideology of peace ===
In his book The Ideology of Peace, Khan writes that history abounds with preachers of peace. He says that in centuries no revolution in the true sense of the word has been brought about based on peace. He writes that for peace, the human need is not enough to make him exercise restraint and remain peaceable. Man needs an ideology that convinces him at the conscious level of the necessity to keep the peace at all times. According to Khan, this ideology is the one presented in Islam.

=== Hudaybiya Model: peace, not justice ===
In his book The Prophet of Peace, Khan writes that the greatest fallacy entertained by people of a militant cast of minds is that they think true peace is accompanied by justice. Khan objects to the mentality of "peace without justice is no peace at all." Khan says that the life of the Islamic prophet Muhammad provides a telling example of this wisdom. Khan argues that the Hudaybiya treaty was a biased and unjust peace treaty based on its terms. However, Muhammad considered it due to a 10-year no-war pact. It took the form of a written pledge from his opponents that they would not initiate any hostilities against him and that they would let him and his followers live in peace in Madinah. According to Khan, the acceptance of the Hudaybiyah treaty resulted into the success of Muhammad's mission. Khan writes that justice can only be within discussion after peace is exercised. He writes, "Asking for justice before peace is like placing the cart before the horse."

=== Islam and politics ===
Khan disagrees with many of Jamal al-Din al-Afghani ideas. Khan argues that al-Afghani made the notion of a political revolution into a religious duty, a binding obligation, like prayers and fasting. Discrediting the religious credentials of political Islam, Khan writes: "The movement was the result of anti-Western rather than pro-Islam feelings."

=== Refuting political interpretation of Islam ===
In time Wahiduddin emerged as a critic of Abul A'la Maududi's Islamist ideas, which he saw as reactionary rather than authentically Islamic. From Khan's perspective, Maududi was treating politics as the center of Islamic activity, when tawhid (the oneness of God) is the actual heart of Islam, and the call to tawhid through dawah should be the center of all Islamic activity. His concern has been to demolish the political interpretation of Islam.

He claims that communal Muslim beliefs and practices are in opposition to authentic Islam by citing the Quran as saying that God "is the Lord of the Worlds" (rab il-aalimeen) (Note: Quran 1:2 ^{(Translated by Pickthall)}. "Praise be to Allah, Lord of the Worlds") and that Muhammad is "a mercy to all mankind" (rahmat ul-aalimeen) (Note: Quran 21:107 ^{(Translated by Mustafa Khattab)}. "We have sent you ˹O Prophet˺ only as a mercy for the whole world."). Khan's position is that these Quranic references show that God and Muhammad are not significant for Muslims only. Hence, looking for the benefit of the Muslim community both in general and specifically through the building of an Islamic state is not the message of the Quran. Instead, the Quranic message and the example of Muhammad are for everybody and belong to everyone, not only to the Muslims.

=== Accepting "political status quo-ism" ===
Khan says that the correct attitude towards politics in Islam is "political status quo-ism." Khan says that with political confrontation all the time, our energy will be spent fighting rivals instead of achieving something more productive. Instead, Khan thinks that Islam teaches that: "Politics is not the only important field of human activity. There are many other vital spheres of work, like education, business, industry, social reform, academic learning, scientific research etc." Hence, the principle of "political status quo-ism" means the opposite to a politics of change, or at least radical change or revolution. Another principle is the avoidance of "political movements" and, instead, a pragmatic focus on education, science, and business.

=== Arguments against suicide bombings ===
Khan denounced martyrdom operations as, according to Islam, people can become martyrs, but they cannot court a martyr's death deliberately. He supports his own position on the debate with Surah Al-Anfal (eight chapter of the Quran). In Khan's commentary, he elaborates that the Surah only shows the responsibility to prepare military deterrent defences as a "demonstration of force." In Khan's words, "the verse offers us a peaceful strategy to counter the enemy." For this reason, he thinks that the Surah only means building a strong defence to deter warfare and attacks.

=== Existence of God ===
Khan believed that there is certainly a scientific basis for belief in the existence of God. But people generally fail to discover it for the simple reason that they try to apply a criterion that they wrongly believe to be scientific. They want a proof in terms of observation, whereas this is neither the scientific method nor the criterion by which to judge. He argues in his book God Arises that if one applies the right criterion, they will find that God is a proven fact.

=== Theme of the Quran: tadabbur, tafakkur, tawassum ===
According to Khan, the main themes of the Quran are enlightenment, closeness to God, peace and spirituality. The Quran uses several terms, tawassum, tadabbur, and tafakkur, which indicate the learning of lessons through reflection, thinking and contemplation on the signs of God scattered across the world.

=== Tazkiyah: re-engineering of minds towards peace and spirituality ===
Khan says that people are born spiritual but the multiple influences from society condition a man's personality or nurture one based on negative feelings. Khan says, we, therefore, have to consciously activate our mind and de-condition or purify it so as to develop our personality on positive lines as only a positive personality will find entry into paradise.

Khan has laid great emphasis on ‘tazkiyah’ which he has described as “an awakening of the mind or purification or deconditioning that leads to our personality development”.

=== Muslims and scientific, secular education ===
In his paper titled "Muslims and the Scientific Education", Khan addresses the negative perception that Islam discourages Muslims from acquiring scientific education or does nothing to encourage it.

Khan argues that innumerable verses from the Quran and many sayings of Muhammad can be quoted which explicitly urge their readers to delve deeper into the mysteries of the earth and the heavens.

For Khan "making a study of nature is to discover the Creator in His creation". Khan quotes Muslim history to contradict the supposition that Islam is an obstacle to scientific investigation.

He quotes some achievements of Muslim scientists and doctors in the Middle Ages which he says were indeed surprising because of their tremendous scope.

=== Pro-self activism and anti-self activism ===
In his article titled, "Pro-Self Activism, Anti-Self Activism", Khan writes that in the present age of professionalism, having a profession means living for others.

Khan explains that people live for others and hardly know their own self, for example, film actors live for their audiences, businessmen for their customers, lawyers for their clients, politicians for their voters, employees for their company bosses, and so on.

This is why Khan says that so many people have become non-self actors which is a great loss for a person, as people almost always remain unaware of themselves. People frequently evaluate themselves according to others’ perceptions and not their own and are unable to unfold their real potential, and finally die in this state of unawareness, writes Khan.

If people are judged on this basis, they can be put into three categories: anti-self activists, non-self activists, and pro-self activists. All persons fall into one or other of these categories, writes Khan.

- He says that the worst case here is of anti-self activists, a term Khan uses to describe people who are embroiled in the gun and bomb culture; individuals who in the name of annihilating the enemy, are actually fighting with their own selves—sometimes in the sense of psychological killing and at other times in the sense of physical killing, explains Khan. According to Khan, violence, or terrorism, is a negation of God's creation plan for human beings. Indulging in violence means that, instead of properly utilising one's capabilities, one is doing nothing but getting oneself and others killed.
- The second category is that of non-self activists. Such people are gravely under-utilizing the potential given to them by their Creator. What they are doing with the gift given to them by the Creator will certainly not be acceptable to Him.
- The third case is that of pro-self activists. These people are performing their roles in accordance with the creation plan of the Creator. These are the people who discover themselves and also the world in which they find themselves. Through study and contemplation, they understand the higher realities and then rightly prepare themselves for the purpose for which the Creator has created them, writes Khan.

Khan concludes with, “People who belong to this pro-self activists category are human beings in the true sense. They make their plans according to the divine scheme of things. They turn their potential into actuality and thus develop themselves.”

=== Religion and scientific reasoning ===
In his book Religion and Science, Khan argues that in the case of scientific truths, the validity of indirect or inferential argument is a matter of general acceptance. Since religious truths are proved by the logic of similar inferential arguments, it may legitimately be argued that they fall into the same intellectual bracket as scientific truths. As science proves any other facts, Wahiduddin Khan claims to prove the truth about religion in his books.

== Publications ==
The Ar-risala (The Message) Urdu magazine started in 1976, consisting of almost entirely his articles and writing. An English edition of the magazine started in February 1984 and a Hindi version started in December 1990. His articles include 'Hijacking — A Crime', 'Rights of Women in Islam', 'The Concept of Charity in Islam' and 'The Concept of Jihad'.

== List of selected works ==
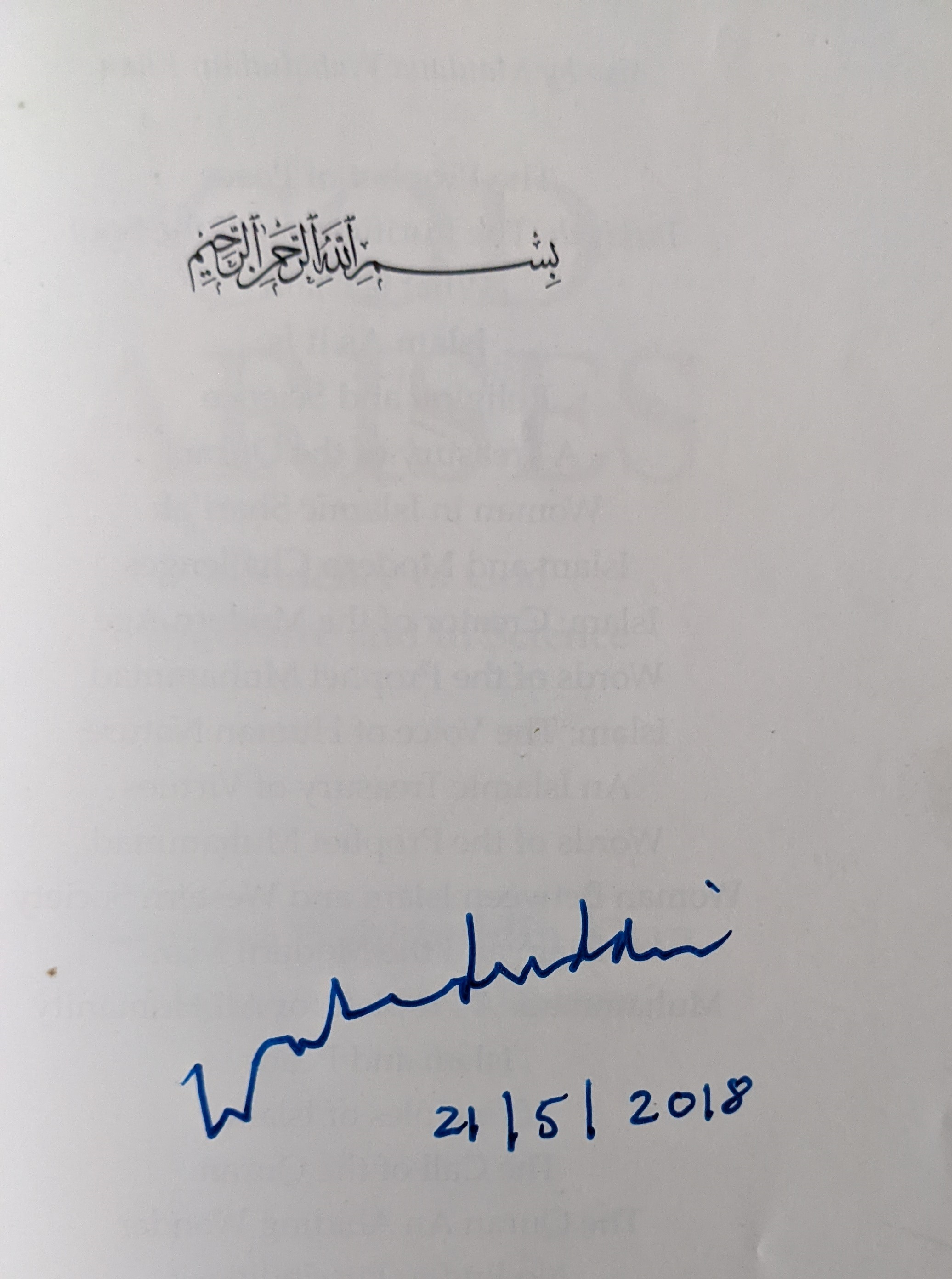
Signature of Maulana Wahiduddin Khan

He "has authored over 200 books on Islam, inter-faith dialogue, social harmony, freedom of speech, prophetic wisdom, spirituality and coexistence in a multi-ethnic society" as well on Islam's relations with modernity and secularism.: Khan published his first book in 1955, which is Naye Ahd Ke Darwaze Par (On the Threshold of a New Era). His next work, Ilme Jadid Ka Challenge (Islam and Modern Challenges) was later published as God Arises.

His book Al Islam has been published in English as The Vision of Islam. In it, he presents the interpretation of the Islamic Scriptures in the modern idiom based on peace and spirituality.

=== Tazkirul Quran ===
Khan translated the Quran in the modern scientific idiom. He translated the Quran in Urdu along with the commentary entitled Tazkirul Quran. The book is available in Hindi (Pavitra Quran) and Arabic (Al Tazkirul Qaweem fi Tafseeril Quran il Hakeem).

=== Kitab-e-Marefat ===
Khan has presented the counter ideology—an ideology of peace—in articles and books such as The Ideology of Peace, The True Jihad, Islam and Peace, The Prophet of Peace: Teachings of The Prophet Muhammad published by Penguin Books, Islam and World Peace and Political Interpretation of Islam. He explains the depths of God realisation in his book, Kitab-e-Marefat.

=== Translation of Quran ===
Khan with his team translated the Quran and commentary into English, which is published under the title, 'The Quran.'

"Simple and direct, the book being extremely readable reaches out to a large audience, Muslims as well as non-Muslim …."— Review of The Quran (English) by the Speaking Tree, Times of India, 16 May 2010

Besides English and Urdu, its translations are now available in Braille (English), German, Spanish, French, Hindi, Marathi, Telugu, and Malayalam and commentary in Arabic, Hindi, Telugu, and Marathi. Efforts are on to translate it into all International and Indian languages. He is the co-founder of Goodword books, a popular publisher of books on Islam.

=== Bibliography ===
==== English Books ====
- A Case of Discovery
- A Treasury of the Quran
- About the Quran
- Calling People to God
- Concerning Divorce
- Discovering God
- Explore Islam
- God Arises: Evidence of God in Nature and in Science
- Hijab in Islam
- In Search Of God
- Indian Muslims: The Need for a Positive Outlook
- Introducing Islam: A Simple Introduction to Islam
- Islam and Peace
- Islam and the Modern Man
- Islam and World Peace
- Islam As It Is
- Islam In History
- Islam Pocket Guide
- Islam Rediscovered: Discovering Islam From Its Original Sources
- Islam Stands The Test Of History
- Islam: Creator of the Modern Age
- Islam and Peace
- Islam and World Peace
- Jihad, Peace, and Inter-Community Relations in Islam
- Leading a Spiritual Life
- Life Death and Beyond
- Man and God
- Man Know Thyself
- Man Made Global Warming
- Manifesto of Peace
- Moral Vision
- Muhammad: The Ideal Character
- Muhammad: A Prophet for All Humanity
- Non-Violence And Islam
- Non-Violence and Peace-Building in Islam
- Peace in Islam
- Peace in Kashmir
- Peace in the Quran
- Polygamy and Islam
- Principles of Islam
- Prophet Muhammad: A Simple Guide to His Life
- Quran Pocket Guide
- Quran: A Simple English Translation
- Quran Teachings Made Simple
- Quran Teachings Made Simple for Women
- Quranic Wisdom
- Ramadan Made Simple
- Religion and Science
- Search For Truth
- Simple Wisdom: A Daybok of Spiritual Living
- Tabligh Movement
- Tazkiya – The Purification of Soul
- The Alarm of Doomsday
- The Call of the Quran
- The Garden of Paradise
- The Good Life
- The Ideology of Peace: Towards a Culture of Peace
- The Issue of Blasphemy
- The Man Islam Builds
- The Moral Vision
- The Prophet Muhammad: A Simple Guide to His Life
- The Prophet of Peace: Teachings of the Prophet Muhammad
- The Prophet of Peace
- The Purpose of Life
- The Quran: A Simple English Translation
- The Prophetic Role of Noah
- The Reality of Life
- The Revolutionary Role of Islam
- The Secret of a Successful Family Life
- The Secret of Success
- The Spirit of Salat (Goodword)
- The Seeker's Guide
- The Teachings of Islam
- The True Face of Islam: Essays
- The True Jihad: The Concepts of Peace, Tolerance, and Non-Violence in Islam
- The Vision of Islam
- Timeless Wisdom
- Uniform Civil Code
- Woman Between Islam and Western Society
- Woman in Islamic Shari'ah
- Words of the Prophet Muhammad

==== Urdu Books ====
- Allah-o-Akbar (اللہ اکبر) (Allah is Greatest)
- Al-Rabbaniah (الربانیہ)
- Amne-Aalam (امن عالم) (The Peace of Universe)
- Aqliat-e-Islam (عقلیت ِ اسلام)
- Aqwal-e-Hikmat (اقوال حکمت)
- Asbaq-e-Tarikh (اسباق تاریخ) (The Lessons of History)
- Asfar-e-Hind (اسفار ہند) (Travelling in Hind)
- Aurat Mamare Insaniyat (عورت معمار انسانیت)
- Azmat-e-Islam (عظمت اسلام)
- Azmat-e-Qur'an (عظمت قران)
- Daur-e-Dawat (دورِ دعوت)
- Deen wa Shari'at (دین و شریعت)
- Deen-e-Insaniyat (دین انسانیت)
- Diary Vol. I (83-84) (ڈائری جلد اول)
- Fikr-e-Islami (فکر اسلامی)
- Hikmat-e-Islam (حکمتِ اسلام)
- Islam: Ek Ta'aruf (اسلام ایک تعارف) (Islam: An Introduction)
- Islami Taalimaat (اسلامی تعلیمات) (Islamic Teachings)
- Karwan-e-Millat (کاروان ملت)
- Khatoon-e-Islam (خاتون اسلام) (Woman of Islam)
- Kitab-e-Marifat (کتاب معرفت)
- Kitab-e-Zindagi (کتاب زندگی) (The Book of Life)
- Mazhab Aur Jadeed Challenge (مذہب اور جدید چیلنج)
- Mutale-Hadith (مطالعہ حدیث)
- Mutale-Qur'an (مطالعہ قران)
- Raz-e-Hayat (رازِ حیات) (The Secret of Life)
- Tabeer Ki Ghalti (تعبیر کی غلطی) (Error of Interpretation)
- 'Tameer-e-Hayat (تعمیر حیات)
- Tasweer-e-Millat (تصویر ملت)
- Tazkirul Quran (تذکیر القران)

==== Hindi Books ====
- Paighambar-e-Islam Hazrat Muhammad ka Jiwan
- Tazkirul Quran
- Quran ki Mahima
- Quran Translation in Hindi

==== Punjabi Books ====
- Islam Ek Swabhik Dharm
- Seerat-e-Rasool
- Sachai di Talaash

== Awards and recognition ==
- Named as "Islam's spiritual ambassador to the world" in the list of "The 500 Most Influential Muslims", in 2009.
- Padma Bhushan in 2000
- Padma Vibhushan in 2021
- National Citizens' Award, presented by Mother Teresa
- Rajiv Gandhi National Sadbhavana Award in 2010
- Demiurgus Peace International Award by former Soviet President Mikhail Gorbachev
- Sayyidina Imam Al Hassan Ibn Ali Peace Award in Abu Dhabi in 2015
- Lifetime achievement award by America's biggest Muslim organisation Islamic Society of North America (ISNA)
- The Communal Harmony Award
- The National Amity Award
- The Aruna Asaf Ali Sadbhavna Award
- FIE Foundation Award
- Urdu Academy Award
- Ambassador of Peace award by the International Federation for World Peace in Korea
- The National Integration Award
- The Diwaliben Mohan Lal Mehta Award
- The Dilli Gaurav Award

== Death ==
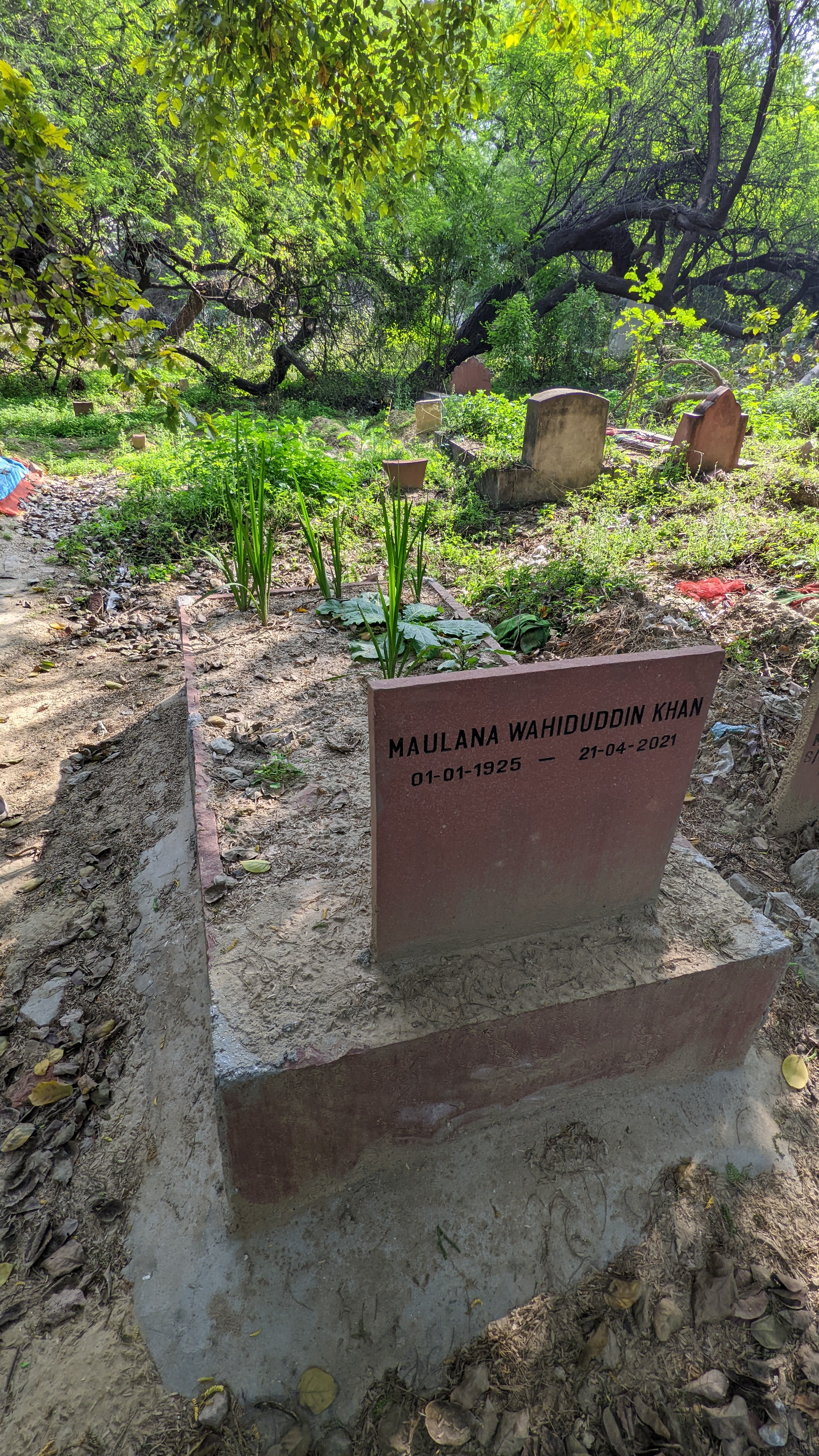
Grave of Maulana Wahiduddin Khan

Wahiduddin Khan, died on 21 April 2021, ten days after he was admitted to Apollo Hospital in Delhi after he tested positive for coronavirus infection at the age of 96. He was buried at Panjpeeran Qabristan near Basti Hazrat Nizamuddin, New Delhi.

He is survived by two sons and two daughters. His son Zafar ul Islam is the former Chairman of the Delhi Minorities Commission. His other son, Saniyasnain Khan is also a children's book author. His daughter, Farida Khanum, is the translator of most of his books and is the chairperson of Centre for Peace and Spirituality.

== See also ==
- Farahi school
- List of peace activists
