= Zafarul Islam Khan =

Indian journalist

Zafar-ul-Islam Khan
- Khan, February 2007
- Born: 12 March 1948 (age 78); Azamgarh, United Provinces, India
- Education: PhD (Islamic Studies), Manchester University, 1987
- Occupations: Journalist, author, Islamic scholar
- Known for: Translation of Al-Islam Yatahadda; Compilation of Palestine Documents; Contributions to The Encyclopaedia of Islam; and Encyclopaedia of Islamic History
- Title: Editor
- Parent(s): Sabea Khan, Wahiduddin Khan

Zafar ul Islam Khan is an Indian author and journalist based in New Delhi. Former chairman of Delhi Minority Commission, he is currently the editor and publisher of The Milli Gazette fortnightly focusing on issues concerning the Muslim community. He is also the founder and chairman of Charity Alliance, an organisation involved in relief and welfare work in India. He also serves as a co-editor of the Urdu journal Ma'arif.

== Birth and Education ==
Khan was born in Badhariya, Azamgarh, India, in March 1948. He is the son of Maulana Wahiduddin Khan, a Muslim thinker who ran the Al Risala/Islamic Center in New Delhi. His primary education was at Madrasa-tul-Islah, a madrasah in Azamgarh, and Darul Uloom Nadwatul Ulama, Lucknow. Later he studied at Al-Azhar and Cairo University in Egypt during 1966–73. He obtained his PhD in Islamic Studies from the University of Manchester in 1987.

== Career ==
In the 1970s he worked with the Libyan Foreign Ministry as translator-editor. In the 1980s he was with the London-based The Muslim Institute, running their MuslimMedia newsservice and other publications. The Muslim Institute went on to form the Muslim Parliament, an informal body of leading British Muslims. He is the author or translator of over 50 books in Arabic, English and Urdu including "Hijrah in Islam" (Delhi, 1996) and Palestine Documents (New Delhi 1998). He has contributed eight articles to the Encyclopaedia of Islam (Leiden) on Indo-Muslim themes. He is a regular commentator on Islamic and South Asian issues on radio and TV channels, including Al Jazeera and BBC Arabic and his writings appear in Arabic newspapers and magazines. In 2000, Khan started Milli Gazette, an English language fortnightly compact newspaper.

In December 2007, he was elected for a two-year term (2008–2009) as President of the All India Muslim Majlis-e-Mushawarat, the umbrella body of Muslim organisations in India. He has also been elected as the President of AIMMM for 2012 and re-elected for a further two-year term (2014-2015). In an interview to rediff.com he claimed there is "no tangible proof of Muslims' involvement in terrorism" in India.

In July 2017, he was appointed as Chairman for a three-year term of Delhi Minorities Commission, a quasi-judicial body to take care of the welfare and interests of the designated minorities in the Indian capital region. As chairman, Khan formed a fact-finding committee to report and suggest recommendations to Delhi Government about the 2020 Delhi riots.

In October 2023, he published an English translation of the Muslims' Holy Book the Quran: The Glorious Quran.

== Sedition Case ==
On 28 April 2020, Khan made a Facebook post arguing that Muslims in India were facing "hate campaigns, lynching and riots" by what he called were "Hindutva bigots". Khan also thanked Kuwait for its support for Indian Muslims. Facing backlash, he later apologized for the post, calling it ill-timed. However, based on a complaint, the Delhi Police charged Khan with sedition under Section 124A of the Indian Penal Code. A public statement in solidarity with Khan was signed by various notable figures including Swami Agnivesh, Gopal Menon, Kavita Krishnan and Annie Namala.

Two petitions filed in the Delhi High Court against him have been disposed on their first day of hearing, 5 May 2020 and 11 May 2020 respectively.
