= SOS Children's Villages =

Austria-based international children's non-governmental organization

- SOS-Kinderdorf
- Formation: 1949; 77 years ago
- Founder: Hermann Gmeiner
- Type: International non-governmental organization
- Registration no.: ZVR 083115702 (Austria)
- Legal status: Federation of national associations
- Purpose: Child welfare, alternative care, family strengthening, humanitarian assistance, child advocacy
- Headquarters: Vienna, Austria
- Region served: Worldwide (130+ countries and territories)
- Members: 118 national member associations
- Chief Executive Officer: Jessica Claire Harmer
- President: Dereje Wordofa
- Chair of International Board: Mimmo Parisi
- Website: www.sos-childrensvillages.org

SOS Children's Villages (German: SOS-Kinderdorf) is an independent, non-governmental international organization headquartered in Vienna, Austria. Founded in 1949 by Hermann Gmeiner, the organization provides alternative care, family strengthening, and child protection services for children who have lost parental care or are at risk of losing it. Operating in over 130 countries and territories worldwide, it is funded through private contributions, corporate partnerships, and government grants.

The organization was awarded the Conrad N. Hilton Humanitarian Prize in 2002 and the Princess of Asturias Award of Concord in 2016. However, in the 2010s and 2020s, the organization became the subject of major international inquiries and media investigations concerning aggressive door-to-door fundraising practices, historical physical and sexual abuse, and alleged political collusion during conflict operations.

== History ==
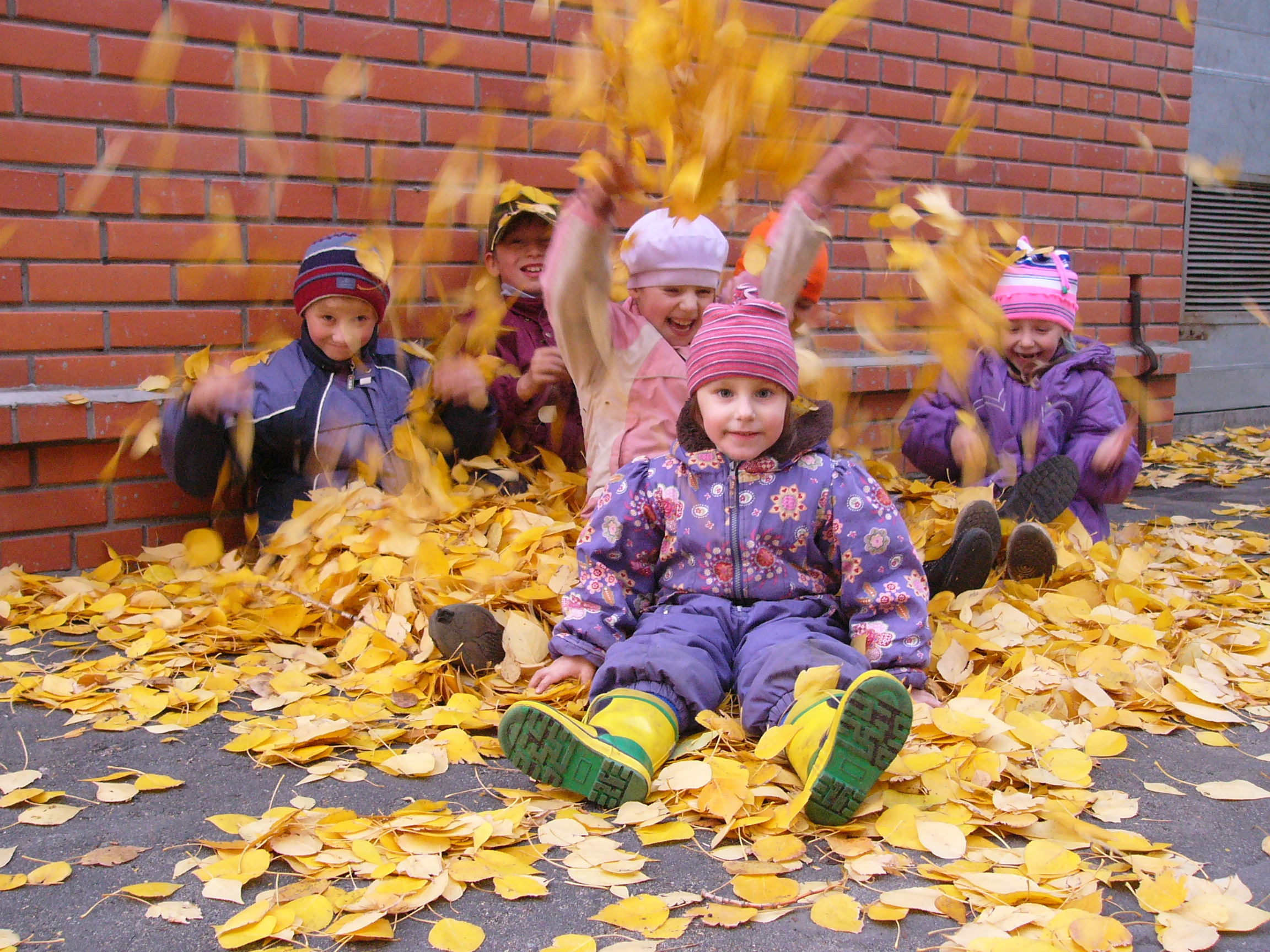
Children at SOS Children's Villages in Kandalaksha in Russia

The Second World War resulted in many children becoming homeless and orphaned. Hermann Gmeiner (23 June 1919 – 26 April 1986), who himself participated in the war a soldier in the Wehrmacht, founded the first SOS Children's Village in Imst in the Austrian Federal State of Tyrol in 1949 together with Maria Hofer, Josef Jestl, Ludwig Kögel, Herbert Pfanner, and Hedwig Weingartner. Originally, the SOS Children's Village was established to look after the orphans of the Second World War. But later the organization eventually started looking after other children who had experienced abandonment, neglect, and abuse.

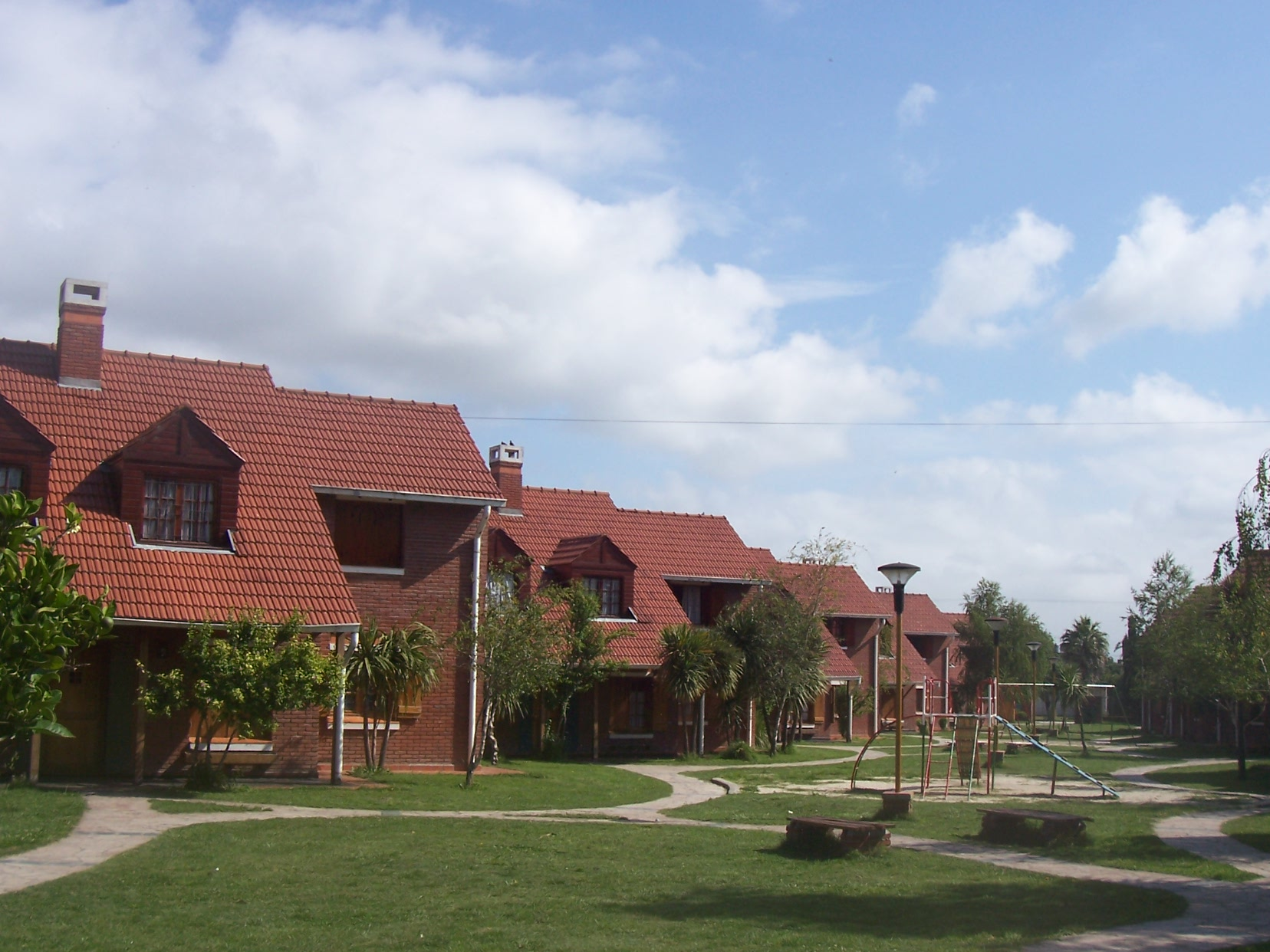
SOS Children's Villages in Argentina

In the second half of the 20th century, the organization spread all over Europe. In 1959, SOS Children's Villages national associations were established in Italy, France, and Germany, and in the same year, the first SOS Children's Villages Youth Facility was founded in Innsbruck, Austria. The first caregiver for SOS Children's Villages was the Austrian Maria Weber (1919–2011). This first patron was Béatrice von Boch-Galhau (1914–2011). She financed the first SOS Children's Villages programme in Germany (Hilbringen / Saar) with her private assets and she used her political and business connections to promote the idea. As the organization grew, the umbrella organization SOS-Kinderdorf International was established to oversee all the national associations in the world in 1960. In the same year, the first SOS Children's Villages organization in South America was founded in Uruguay. In 1963, the organization reached Asia with the first programmes established in South Korea and India. Seven years later, the organization founded programmes in Africa in the Republic of Ivory Coast, Kenya, Ghana, and Sierra Leone. In North America, the first programme was established in 1991 in the United States. Today, there are more than 570 SOS Children's Villages programmes present in 135 countries and territories.

In 2006, the "Colegio Internacional SOS Hermann Gmeiner", in Santa Ana, Costa Rica, re-opened as the United World College of Costa Rica, becoming the 11th United World College and the only UWC in Latin America and the Caribbean. Although no longer operating under the auspices of the SOS Children's Villages, the college continues to have a relationship with the organization, including a program of full scholarships for SOS Children's Villages students, with more than 50 SOS Children's Villages students having attended and graduated from the school.

Hermann Gmeiner was the SOS Children's Villages president until 1985 when he was succeeded by Helmut Kutin. Helmut Kutin, born in 1941 in Bolzano, Italy, who was one of the first children admitted in SOS Austria, led the organization SOS Children's Villages International for 27 years after which in 2012, he was succeeded by Siddhartha Kaul, born in 1951 in Pilani, India.

== Governance and financial structure ==
=== Administrative structure ===
The umbrella federation consists of national member associations operating across more than 130 countries under special consultative status with the United Nations Economic and Social Council (ECOSOC):

- General Assembly: The highest decision-making body, comprising representatives of all member associations, responsible for electing executive leadership and approving federation statutes.
- International Senate: Composed of 22 elected members who formulate policy changes, procedural quality standards, and global strategic goals.
- Management Council & Secretariat: Led by the President and Chief Executive Officer, overseeing global administration from international headquarters in Vienna and Innsbruck, Austria, supported by regional secretariats in West Africa, East Africa, Latin America, Asia, and Europe.

=== Financial support, auditing, and oversight ===
SOS Children's Villages relies on a combination of individual child sponsorships ("Patenschaften"), corporate partnerships, foundation grants, and statutory government funding.

- Financial Standards: Consolidated global financial statements are audited annually by independent external accounting firms in compliance with International Financial Reporting Standards (IFRS).
- Institutional & Corporate Partnerships: Contracts with institutional donors (such as the European Union and national development agencies) and corporate partners (including CEMEX and Radisson Hotel Group) provide funding for long-term child protection, disaster relief, and youth employment initiatives.
- Independent Evaluations: Operational compliance, financial transparency, and community contributions are periodically evaluated by international bodies and independent charity awards, such as the Esteban Campodónico Prize (2010).

== International frameworks ==
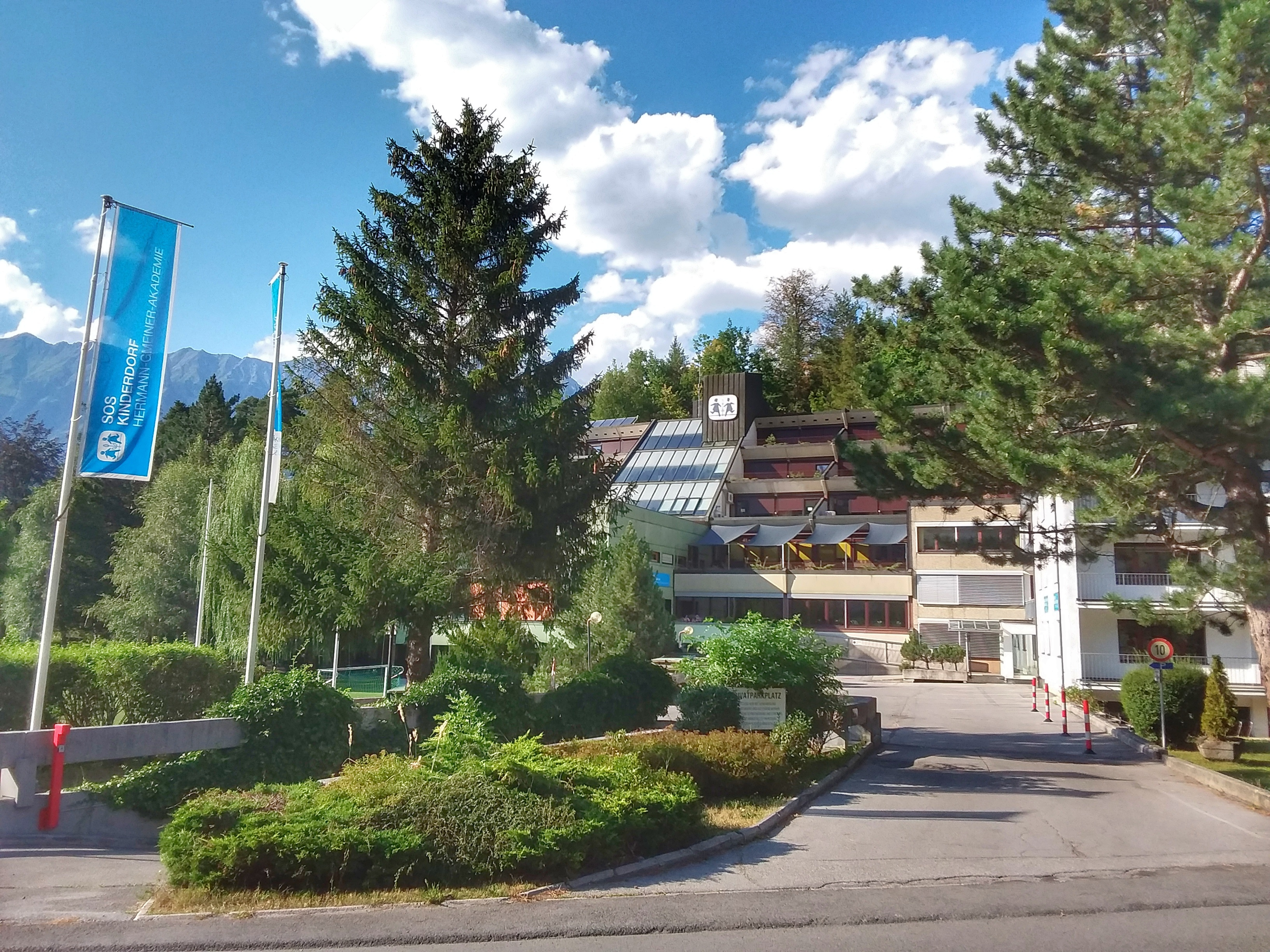
SOS Children's Villages Hermann Gmeiner Academy, Austria

The organization follows three international frameworks that serve as guidelines for their work. The United Nations Convention on the Rights of the Child (UNCRC) adopted in 1989 is a human rights treaty that sets out the civil, political, economic, social, health, and cultural rights of children. The UN Guidelines for Alternative Care of Children adopted in 2009 provides a framework for governments to acknowledge and deliver alternative care to children growing up without adequate parental care. And the UN Sustainable Development Goal adopted in 2015 and valid until 2030 in which SOS Children's Villages work focuses mainly on children and families living in vulnerable circumstances.

== Advocacy and child rights initiatives ==
SOS Children's Villages engages in international policy advocacy, child rights monitoring, and youth employability initiatives in collaboration with intergovernmental bodies and academic institutions:

- UN Alternative Care Guidelines Advocacy (Care for ME!, 2012–2016): Launched on December 10, 2012 (Human Rights Day), the organization conducted a global rights-based advocacy initiative to monitor national compliance with the 2009 United Nations Guidelines for the Alternative Care of Children. Developed in collaboration with child rights scholars Nigel Cantwell and Professor June Thoburn, the initiative published diagnostic assessment frameworks to evaluate state care standards and prevent unnecessary family separation across Europe, Latin America, and Africa.
- Care-Leaver Legislative Reform (I Matter, 2009–2013): Between 2009 and 2013, the organization conducted an international policy campaign advocating for legislative protections for youth transitioning out of alternative care. Campaign advocacy contributed to statutory reforms in Eastern European nations, including raising the legal care-leaving age from 14 to 18 years in Albania.
- Youth Employability Partnerships (YouthCan!, 2017–present): Established in 2017, YouthCan! is a global employability and entrepreneurship program for youth aged 14 to 25 growing up without parental care. Implemented across multiple developing nations, the platform connects youth with professional mentorship, technical training, and work placements.
- FIFA World Cup Fundraising (6 Villages for 2006): Organized as the official joint charity campaign of the 2006 FIFA World Cup in Germany, the initiative raised over €21 million in partnership with FIFA, funding the construction of six new residential villages in Brazil, Mexico, Nigeria, South Africa, Ukraine, and Vietnam.

== Global presence and regional network ==
As of 2026, SOS Children's Villages operates national associations and representative offices across more than 130 countries and territories worldwide under consultative status with the United Nations:

=== Operational Structure by Region ===
The global network is coordinated through regional secretariats that oversee long-term care facilities, family strengthening programs, and emergency relief operations:

- Africa (47 nations): Programs operate across North, West, East, and Southern Africa. Key regional hubs include Senegal, Kenya, and South Africa, focusing on family preservation, HIV/AIDS orphan care, and emergency refugee response.
- Americas (22 nations): Active across North, Central, and South America, including residential facilities in Argentina, Bolivia, Brazil, Colombia, and the United States. In Costa Rica, the former Colegio Internacional SOS Hermann Gmeiner transitioned into the United World College of Costa Rica in 2006.
- Asia & Middle East (34 nations): Programs operate across South Asia, East Asia, and the Middle East, including extensive operations in India, Nepal, South Korea, Vietnam, and emergency child-protection centers in Syria and Palestine.
- Europe (35 nations): Includes the original 1949 founding village in Imst, Austria, as well as facilities across Western, Central, and Eastern Europe. Representative fundraising offices are maintained in countries including Denmark, Sweden, and the Swiss Confederation.
- Oceania: Operations and partner support offices are maintained in Australia and French Polynesia.

=== Africa ===
Algeria	Angola	Benin	Botswana	Burkina Faso	Burundi	Cameroon
Cape Verde	Central African Republic	Chad	Ivory Coast	Democratic Republic of the Congo	Djibouti	Egypt
Equatorial Guinea	Ethiopia	(The Gambia) Gambia	Ghana	Guinea	Guinea-Bissau	Kenya
Lesotho	(Liberia) Libera	Madagascar	Malawi	Mali	Mauritius	Morocco
Mozambique	Namibia	Niger	Nigeria	Rwanda	Senegal	Sierra Leone
Somalia	Somaliland	South Africa	South Sudan	Sudan	(Eswatini) Swaziland	Tanzania
Togo	Tunisia	Uganda	Zambia	Zimbabwe		

=== Americas ===
Argentina	Bolivia	Brazil	Canada	Chile	Costa Rica	Dominican Republic	Colombia
Ecuador	El Salvador	Guatemala	Haiti	Honduras	Jamaica	Mexico	
Nicaragua	Panama	Paraguay	Peru	Uruguay	United States	Venezuela	

=== Asia ===
Armenia	Azerbaijan	Bahrain	(Bangladesh) Bangladeshi	Cambodia	China	(Georgia (country)) Georgia	
India	Indonesia	Israel	Japan	Jordan	Kazakhstan	Kuwait	
Kyrgyzstan	Laos	Lebanon	Mongolia	Nepal	Oman	Qatar	
Pakistan	Palestine	Philippines	Saudi Arabia	South Korea	Sri Lanka	Syria	Iraq
Taiwan	Thailand	United Arab Emirates *	Uzbekistan	Vietnam			

=== Europe ===
Albania	Austria (suspended)	Belarus	Belgium	Bosnia and Herzegovina	Bulgaria	Croatia
Czech Republic	Denmark *	Estonia	Finland	France	Germany	Greece
Hungary	Iceland *	Italy	Kosovo	Latvia	Lithuania	Luxembourg
North Macedonia	Netherlands*	Northern Cyprus	Norway	Poland	Portugal	Romania
Russia (suspended)	Serbia	Spain	Sweden *	Switzerland*	Ukraine	United Kingdom *

=== Oceania ===
* Australia	French Polynesia

== Controversies and inquiries ==
=== Direct marketing and fundraising tactics ===
The charity has faced criticism regarding its use of third-party face-to-face (F2F) and door-to-door fundraising agencies. Investigative reporting by Conor Gogarty for Wales Online and rulings by the UK Fundraising Regulator highlighted aggressive, high-pressure sales scripts designed to secure long-term recurring donations, complex sub-contracting chains (Zen Fundraising, Hub Global, Vantage & Solution), and training methods described by critics as high-coercion.

=== Ethiopian branch religious neutrality dispute (2018) ===
In January 2018, allegations surfaced regarding the Ethiopian branch of SOS Children's Villages, claiming that Christian children had been subjected to forced religious conversions. SOS Children's Villages denied systemic forced conversions but confirmed that a mosque constructed on SOS property had violated organizational neutrality policies and was subsequently closed.

=== Allegations of Assad regime collusion in Syria (2025) ===
In August 2025, an investigation published by The New York Times Magazine by Shane Bauer and Jim Huylebroek alleged that SOS Children's Villages International cooperated with Syrian state authorities under the Assad regime, resulting in children of political opponents being placed in institutional care and classified as orphans without tracing surviving family members. In October 2026, BBC News reported a lack of external follow-up from the organization.

=== Abuse allegations and Griss independent reform commission (2025–2026) ===
In September and October 2025, major German and Austrian investigative outlets—including Der Spiegel, taz, and Falter—detailed allegations of historical physical, psychological, and sexual abuse occurring across several SOS Children's Villages in Austria (including Imst and Moosburg) and Nepal, with allegations extending to founder Hermann Gmeiner.

Further reporting revealed that former president Helmut Kutin had been informed of an Austrian major donor who was permitted overnight access to villages in Nepal between 2010 and 2014, where the donor committed sexual abuse against eight children.

Following these revelations:

- An independent Austrian inquiry commission chaired by former Supreme Court President Irmgard Griss was formed to examine organizational structures, power concentration, and oversight failures.
- Managing Director Christian Moser was suspended from duties.
- Supervisory board member Willibald Cernko resigned.
- The International Office of SOS Children's Villages submitted internal investigative dossiers to the Public Prosecutor's Office in Vienna ('Wiener Staatsanwaltschaft').
- In June 2026, the Independent Reform Commission chaired by Irmgard Griss published its final report (Abschlussbericht), criticizing historical patriarchal power structures and an institutional culture of concealment, prompting global safeguarding overhauls, victim support funds, and archival openness.

== Patrons and ambassadors ==
SOS Children's Villages has received advocacy support, patronage, and field project involvement from international public figures, philanthropists, and sports organizations:

- Philanthropic Patrons: Early European expansion was financed in part by private patrons, including German-British businesswoman Béatrice von Boch-Galhau. Former South African President Nelson Mandela advocated for the charity's expansion in post-apartheid South Africa and officially opened the SOS Children's Village in Cape Town in May 1996.
- Goodwill Ambassadors: In 1995, Princess Salimah Aga Khan was appointed as the organization's first global Senior International Goodwill Ambassador, promoting child welfare programs across Asia and Africa. Footballer Vincent Kompany served as an international ambassador, raising funds and supporting the construction of an SOS Children's Village providing family care for over 150 children in Kinshasa, Democratic Republic of the Congo. Other long-standing ambassadors have included Kaká and Ruud van Nistelrooy.
- International Sports Coalitions: Organized as the official charity partner of the 2006 FIFA World Cup in Germany, the 6 Villages for 2006 campaign raised over €21 million in partnership with FIFA, constructing six new residential villages in Brazil, Mexico, Nigeria, South Africa, Ukraine, and Vietnam. Additional tournament charity partnerships have been conducted in collaboration with UEFA.

== See also ==
- Child abandonment – Social and economic factors surrounding parental loss and desertion
- Child protection – Frameworks and measures to prevent abuse, neglect, and exploitation of minors
- Convention on the Rights of the Child – 1989 United Nations treaty establishing international child rights standards
- Deinstitutionalization (child care) – Global movement transitioning care from traditional orphanages to family- and community-based settings
- Foster care – System of alternative care providing temporary or long-term family placement
- International non-governmental organization – Global non-state organizations operating across international borders
- Orphanage – Residential institutions historically dedicated to the care of children without living parents
- Unaccompanied minor – Children separated from parents or legal guardians, particularly during conflict or displacement
