= Hermann Gmeiner =

Austrian philanthropist (1919–1986)

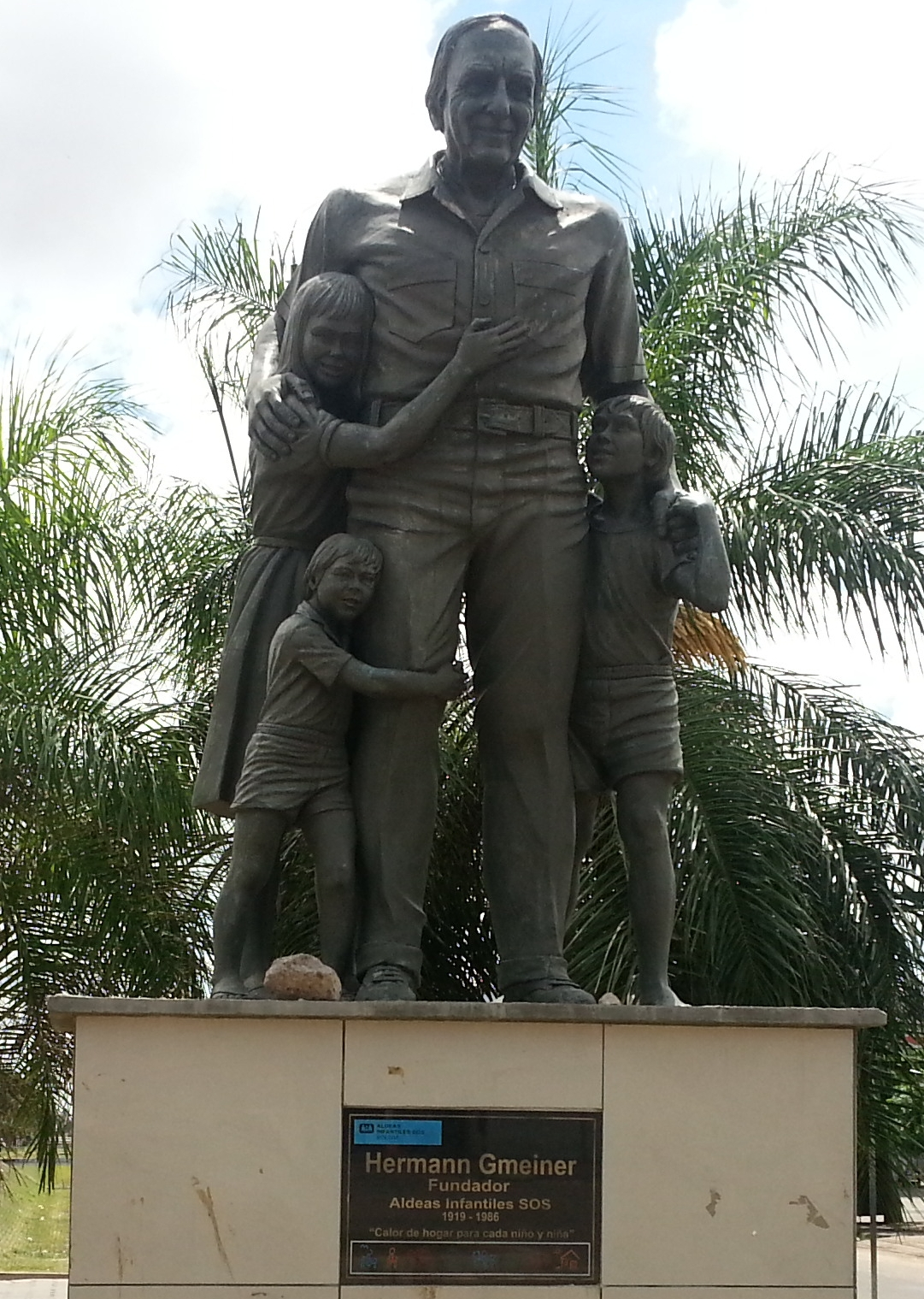
- Statue of Hermann Gmeiner in Santa Cruz, Bolivia
- Born: 23 June 1919; Alberschwende, Vorarlberg, Republic of German-Austria
- Died: 26 April 1986 (aged 66); Innsbruck, Austria

Hermann Gmeiner (23 June 1919 – 26 April 1986) from Austria founded the charity SOS Children's Villages.

== Life ==
Born to a big family of farmers in Vorarlberg (in Austria), Gmeiner was a talented child and won a scholarship to attend grammar school. His mother died while he was still a young boy, and his eldest sister Elsa took on the task of caring for the smallest of the children.

Having experienced the horrors of war himself as a Wehrmacht soldier fighting in the USSR, he was then confronted with the isolation and suffering of the many war orphans and homeless children as a child welfare worker after the end of the Second World War. In his conviction that help can never be effective as long as the children have to grow up without a home of their own, he set about implementing his idea for SOS Children's Villages.

With just 600 Austrian schillings (approx. 40 US dollars) in his pocket Hermann Gmeiner established the SOS Children's Village Association in 1949, and in the same year the foundation stone was laid for the first SOS Children's Village in Imst, in the Austrian state of Tyrol. His work with the children and development of the SOS Children's Village organization kept Hermann Gmeiner so busy that he finally decided to discontinue his medical degree course.

In the following decades his life was inseparably linked with his commitment to a family-centred child-care concept based on the four pillars of a mother, a house, brothers and sisters, and a village. Given his exclusive focus on the need to help abandoned children, the rest of his biography reads like the history of SOS Children's Villages themselves. He served as Village Director in Imst, organized the construction of further SOS Children's Villages in Austria, and helped to set up SOS Children's Villages in many other countries of Europe.

In 1960 SOS-Kinderdorf International was established in Strasbourg as the umbrella organization for SOS Children's Villages with Hermann Gmeiner as the first president. In the following years the activities of SOS Children's Villages spread beyond Europe. The sensational "grain of rice" campaign raised enough funds to permit the first non-European SOS Children's Village to be built in Daegu, Korea in 1963, and SOS Children's Villages on the American and African continents followed.

By 1985 the result of Hermann Gmeiner's work was a total of 233 SOS Children's Villages in 85 countries. In recognition of his services to orphaned and abandoned children he received numerous awards and was nominated several times for the Nobel Peace Prize. However, he was always at pains to stress that it was only thanks to the support of millions of people that it had been possible to achieve the goal of providing abandoned children with a permanent home, and that still applies today.

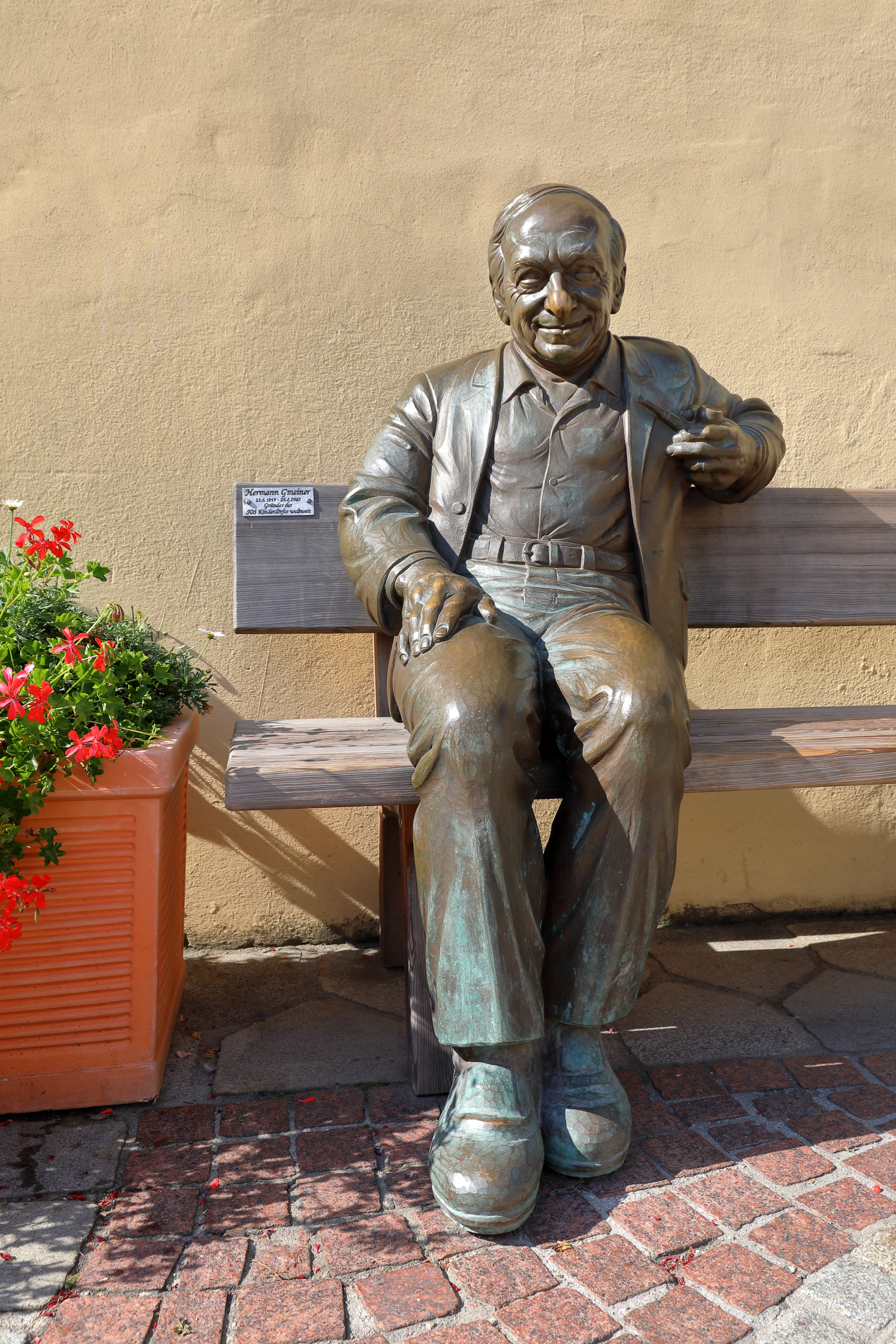
Hermann Gmeiner sculpture in his birthplace Imst

Hermann Gmeiner died in Innsbruck in 1986. He is buried at SOS Children's Village Imst.

SOS Children's Villages is currently active in 132 countries and territories. 438 SOS Children's Villages and 346 SOS Youth Facilities provide more than 60,000 children and youths in need with a new home. More than 131,000 children/youths attend SOS Kindergartens, SOS Hermann Gmeiner Schools and SOS Vocational Training Centres. Around 397,000 people benefit from the services provided by SOS Medical Centres, 115,000 people from services provided by SOS Social Centres. SOS Children's Villages also helps in situations of crisis and disaster through emergency relief programmes. The emergency clinic in Mogadishu (provides app. 260,000 check-ups and treatments a year) is one example of a huge long-term relief project.

There are 15 schools holding his name: one in Innsbruck, Austria, one in Tirana, Albania and 13 in Vietnam.

== Abuse scandal ==
In October 2025, it became known that allegations of abuse against Gmeiner had been made since at least the 2010s. The organization SOS Children's Villages announced that in victim protection proceedings between 2013 and 2023, at least eight victims had credibly demonstrated that Gmeiner had sexually abused and physically mistreated them, and that they had each been awarded compensation payments of up to €25,000. The offences are said to have been committed between the 1950s and 1980s at four locations in Austria against at least eight male children and adolescents.

== Quotation by Hermann Gmeiner ==
- "Every big thing in the world only comes true, when somebody does more than he has to do."
- "All the children of the world are our children."

== Works ==
- Impressions, Thoughts, Confessions – SOS Children's Villages In Many Countries [Eindrücke, Gedanken, Bekenntnisse], 1979.

== Sources ==
- Hermann Gmeiner. The father of SOS Children's Villages (Der Vater der SOS-Kinderdörfer) from Hansheinz Reinprecht-Molden, Verlag Taschenbuch, Munich, 1984.
- H. Schreiber/W. Vyslozil: SOS Children's Villages - Tracing the Roots, SOS-Kinderdorf International, Innsbruck, Austria, 2003.

The first SOS Children's Villages in Vietnam was established in 1987
