= Al Jihad fil Islam =

Book by Abul A'la Maududi

- Author: Abul A'la Maududi
- Translator: Syed Rafatullah Shah (English)
- Illustrator: Syed Firasat Shah
- Language: Urdu
- Subject: About Jihad, International Policy
- Published: 1927
- Publisher: Markazi Maktaba-yi Islami, Delhi
- Publication place: Pakistan
- English publication date: 17 June 2017
- Media type: Print Book
- Pages: 632 Pages
- ISBN: 978-1-52-209065-6

Al Jihad fil Islam (Eng: The Concept of Jihad in Islam) is a book written by Sayyid Abul Ala Maududi on the subject of jihad in Islam. The book is an English translation of the classic book in jihad, originally written and published in 1927 in the Urdu language.

== Background ==
A major part of the book deals with the comparative study of the concept of a just war in various theologies. This book covers various important events of World War I in great detail and provides a critical analysis of the conflict and post conflict development of international accords with respect to war.

== Edition ==
Edition of (Al Jihad fil Islam)
Year	Language	Publication	Type
1930	Urdu	Matba-i Maʻarif al-Musannifin, Azamgarh	Print book
1948	Urdu	Daftar-i Tarjumān al-Qurʼan, Lahore	Print book
1948	Urdu	Daftar-i Tarjumān al-Qurʼan, Lahore	Print book
1962	Urdu	Lahore Islamic Publications	Print book
1967	Urdu	Lahore Islamic Publications	Print book
1974	Urdu	Idara Tarjuman ul Quran Ltd. Lahore	Print book
1979	Urdu	Markazi Maktabah-yi Islami, Delhi	Print book
1988	Urdu	Markazi Maktaba-yi Islami, Delhi	eBook, Document
1988	Urdu	Markazi Maktaba-yi Islami, Delhi	Print book
1991	Urdu	Markazi Maktaba-yi Islami, Delhi	Print book

== Appreciations ==
Allama Iqbal read Al Jihad fil Islam and hailed it as the best explication of the concept of jihad in any language.

== See also ==
- Islamic Way of Life
- Human Rights in Islam
- Towards Understanding Islam
- Qadiani Problem
