= Human rights in Islam =

Human rights in Islam may refer to:

- Human Rights in Islam (book), a 1976 book by Sayyid Abul Ala Maududi, the founder of Jamaat-e-Islami
- Human rights in Islam (speech), a 1987 speech by Ayatollah Ali Khamenei

== See also ==
- Human rights in Islamic countries
- The Cairo Declaration on Human Rights in Islam
- Arab Charter on Human Rights
- Pact of Umar
