= Anti-imperialism =

Political stance in opposition to interventionist or expansionist policies

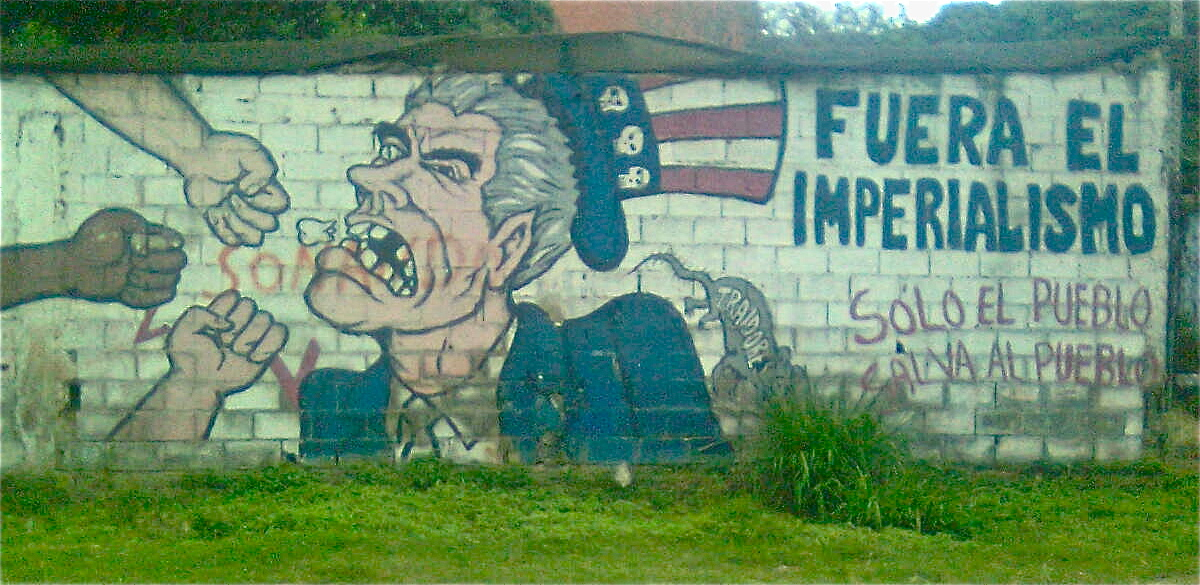
Anti-imperialist Bolivarian propaganda mural in Caracas, Venezuela, specifically targeting American imperialism. Spray painted in Spanish "Out with imperialism, only the people save the people"

Anti-imperialism in political science and international relations is opposition to imperialism or neocolonialism. Anti-imperialist sentiment typically manifests as a political principle in independence struggles against intervention or influence from a global superpower, as well as in opposition to colonial rule. Anti-imperialism can also arise from a specific economic theory, such as in the Leninist interpretation of imperialism (Vladimir Lenin's theory of surplus value being exported to less developed nations in search of higher profits, eventually leading to imperialism), which is derived from Lenin's 1917 work Imperialism, the Highest Stage of Capitalism. People who categorize themselves as anti-imperialists often state that they are opposed to colonialism, colonial empires, hegemony, imperialism and the territorial expansion of a country beyond its established borders.

The phrase gained a wide currency after the Second World War and at the onset of the Cold War as political movements in colonies of European powers promoted national sovereignty. Some anti-imperialist groups who opposed the United States supported the power of the Soviet Union, while in some Marxist schools, such as Maoism, this was criticized as social imperialism. Islamist movements traditionally view the United States, Israel, Russia and China as imperial and neocolonial forces engaged in persecution and oppression of Muslim communities domestically and abroad.

An influential movement independent of the Western left that advocated religious anti-imperialism was pan-Islamism; which challenged the Western civilisational model and rose to prominence across various parts of the Islamic world during the 19th and 20th centuries. Its most influential ideologue was the Sunni theologian Muhammad Rashid Rida, a fierce opponent of Western ideas, who called upon Muslims to rise up in armed resistance by waging jihad against imperialism and re-establish an Islamic caliphate. Through his resolution in the Second World Congress of Comintern (1920), Lenin accused the anti-imperialism of pan-Islamists of favouring the interests of the bourgeoisie, feudal landlords and religious clerics; and incited communists to compulsorily fight pan-Islamism. Since then, Soviet authorities regularly employed the charge of pan-Islamism to target Islamic dissidents for anti-Soviet activities and fomenting anti-communist rebellions.

== Theory ==
Some Enlightenment writers expressed anti-imperialist ideas in the 18th century, especially targeting luxury as an issue.

In the late 1870s, the term "imperialism" was introduced to the English language by opponents of the aggressively imperial policies of British Prime Minister Benjamin Disraeli (in office: 1874–1880). It was shortly appropriated by supporters of "imperialism" such as Joseph Chamberlain (1836–1914). For some, imperialism designated a policy of idealism and philanthropy; others alleged that it was characterized by political self-interest; and a growing number associated it with capitalist greed. John A. Hobson (1858–1940) and Vladimir Lenin (1870–1924) added a more theoretical macroeconomic connotation to the term. Many theoreticians on the left have followed either or both in emphasizing the structural or systemic character of "imperialism." Such writers have expanded the time-period associated with the term so that it now designates neither a policy, nor a short space of decades in the late-19th century, but a global system extending over a period of centuries, often going back to Christopher Columbus. As the application of the term has expanded, its meaning has shifted along five distinct but often parallel axes: the moral, the economic, the systemic, the cultural and the temporal. Those changes reflect—among other shifts in sensibility—a growing unease with the fact of power, specifically Western power.

The relationships between capitalism, aristocracy and imperialism have been discussed and analysed by theoreticians, historians, political scientists such as John A. Hobson, Thorstein Veblen, Joseph Schumpeter and Norman Angell. Those intellectuals produced much of their works about imperialism before World War I (1914–1918), yet their combined work informed the study of the impact of imperialism upon Europe and contributed to the political and ideologic reflections on the rise of the military–industrial complex in the United States from the 1950s onward.

=== Hobson ===
John A. Hobson strongly influenced the anti-imperialism of both Marxists and liberals, worldwide through his 1902 book Imperialism: A Study. He argued that the "taproot of imperialism" is not in nationalist pride, but in capitalism. As a form of economic organization, imperialism is unnecessary and immoral, the result of the mis-distribution of wealth in a capitalist society. That created an irresistible desire to extend national markets into foreign lands, in search of profits greater than those available in the Mother Country. In the capitalist economy, rich capitalists received a disproportionately higher income than did the working class. If the owners invested their incomes in their factories, the greatly increased productive capacity would exceed the growth in demand for the products and services of said factories.

Hobson was influential in liberal circles, especially in the British Liberal Party. Historians Peter Duignan and Lewis H. Gann argue that Hobson had an enormous influence in the early-20th century that caused widespread distrust of imperialism:

Hobson's ideas were not entirely original; however his hatred of moneyed men and monopolies, his loathing of secret compacts and public bluster, fused all existing indictments of imperialism into one coherent system....His ideas influenced German nationalist opponents of the British Empire as well as French Anglophobes and Marxists; they colored the thoughts of American liberals and isolationist critics of colonialism. In days to come they were to contribute to American distrust of Western Europe and of the British Empire. Hobson helped make the British averse to the exercise of colonial rule; he provided indigenous nationalists in Asia and Africa with the ammunition to resist rule from Europe.

Optimistically, Hobson argued that domestic social reforms could cure the international disease of imperialism by removing its economic foundation. Hobson theorized that state intervention through taxation could boost broader consumption, create wealth and encourage a peaceful multilateral world-order. Conversely, should the state not intervene, rentiers (people who earn income from property or securities) would generate socially negative wealth that fostered imperialism and protectionism.

=== Liberal anti-imperialism ===
There have been many examples of liberal anti-imperialism. However, liberal anti-imperialists are distinct from socialist anti-imperialists because they do not oppose capitalism. Most liberal anti-imperialists, similar to socialist anti-imperialists, view internationalism as the primary alternative to imperialism. However, unlike socialists (specifically Marxists), instead of favoring proletarian internationalism, which promotes the spread of socialist revolution, liberals favor liberal internationalism, which promotes international cooperation and the spread of liberal democracy. Liberal anti-imperialism was core to the American Revolution, Latin American Wars of Independence, the Revolutions of 1830 and 1848 in Europe, some decolonial movements in Colonial Africa and Asia, and the Revolutions of 1989.

=== Communist and socialist ===
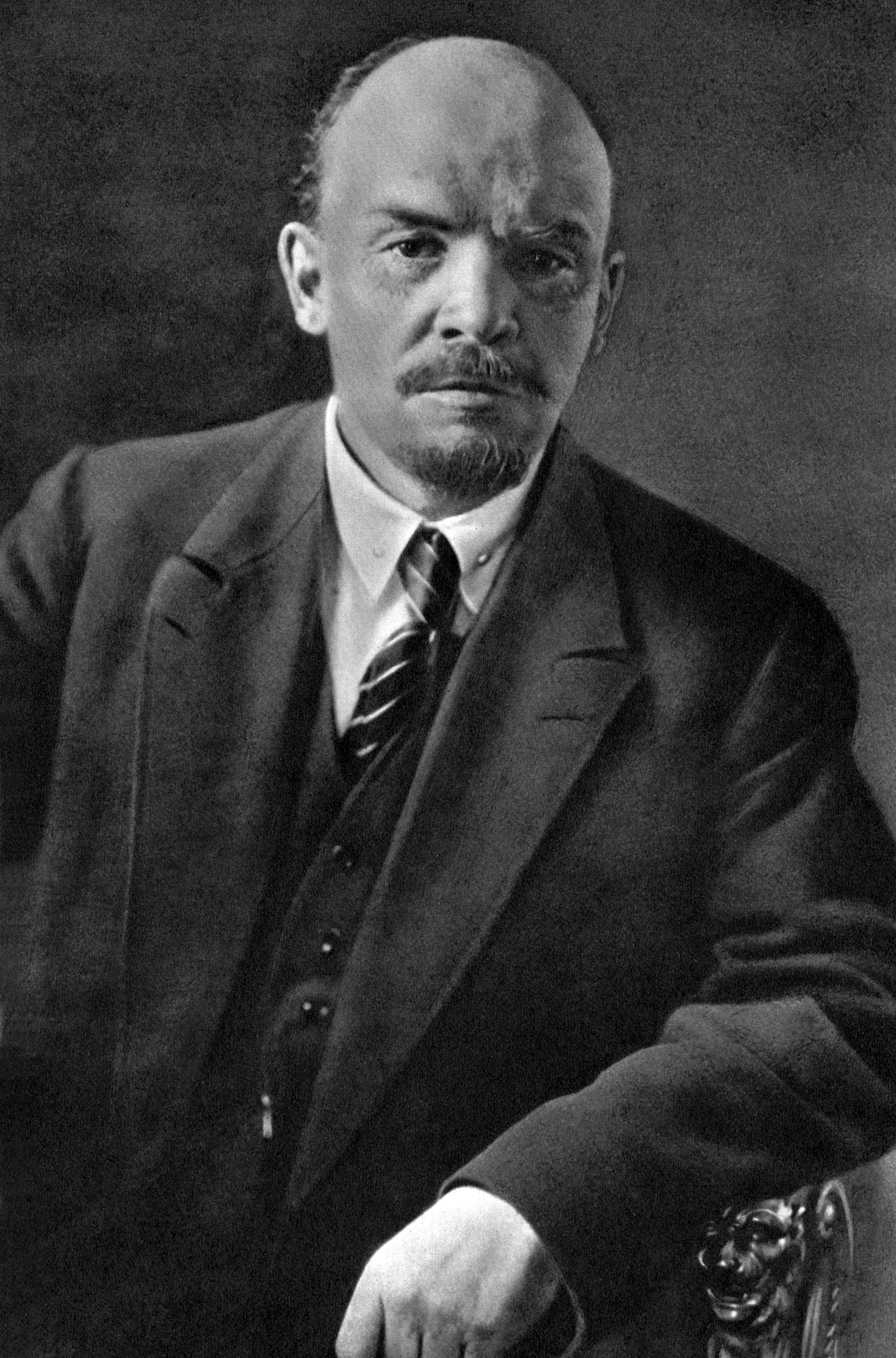
To the Russian revolutionary Vladimir Lenin, imperialism was the highest, but degenerate, stage of capitalism.

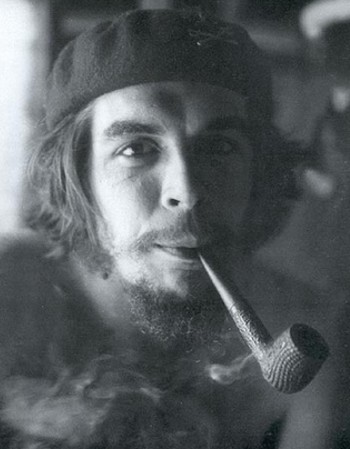
To the Latin American revolutionary Che Guevara, imperialism was a capitalistic geopolitical system of control and repression which must be understood as such in order to be defeated.

In the mid-19th century, Karl Marx mentioned imperialism as part of the prehistory of the capitalist mode of production in Das Kapital (1867–1894). Vladimir Lenin defined imperialism as "the highest stage of capitalism," the economic stage in which monopoly finance capital becomes the dominant application of capital. As such, said financial and economic circumstances impelled national governments and private business corporations to worldwide competition for control of natural resources and human labour by means of colonialism.

==== Leninism and Marxism–Leninism ====
The Leninist views of imperialism and related theories, such as dependency theory, address the economic dominance and exploitation of a country: economic imperialism rather than the military and the political dominance of a people, their country and its natural resources. Hence, the primary purpose of imperialism is economic exploitation, rather than mere control of either a country or of a region. The Marxist and the Leninist denotation thus differs from the usual political science denotation of imperialism as the direct control (intervention, occupation and rule) characteristic of colonial and neocolonial empires as used in the realm of international relations.

Lenin adopted Hobson's ideas. In Imperialism, the Highest Stage of Capitalism (1917), Lenin outlined the five features of capitalist development that lead to imperialism:

1. Concentration of production and capital leading to the dominance of national and multinational monopolies and cartels.
2. Industrial capital as the dominant form of capital has been replaced by finance capital, with the industrial capitalists increasingly reliant on capital provided by monopolistic financial institutions. "Again and again, the final word in the development of banking is monopoly."
3. The export of the aforementioned finance capital is emphasized over the export of goods.
4. The economic division of the world by multinational cartels.
5. The political division of the world into colonies by the great powers, in which the great powers monopolise investment.

Generally, the relationship among Marxist-Leninists and radical, left-wing organisations who are anti-war, often involves persuading such political activists to progress from pacifism to anti-imperialism—that is, to progress from opposing war in general, to the condemnation of the capitalist economic system in particular.

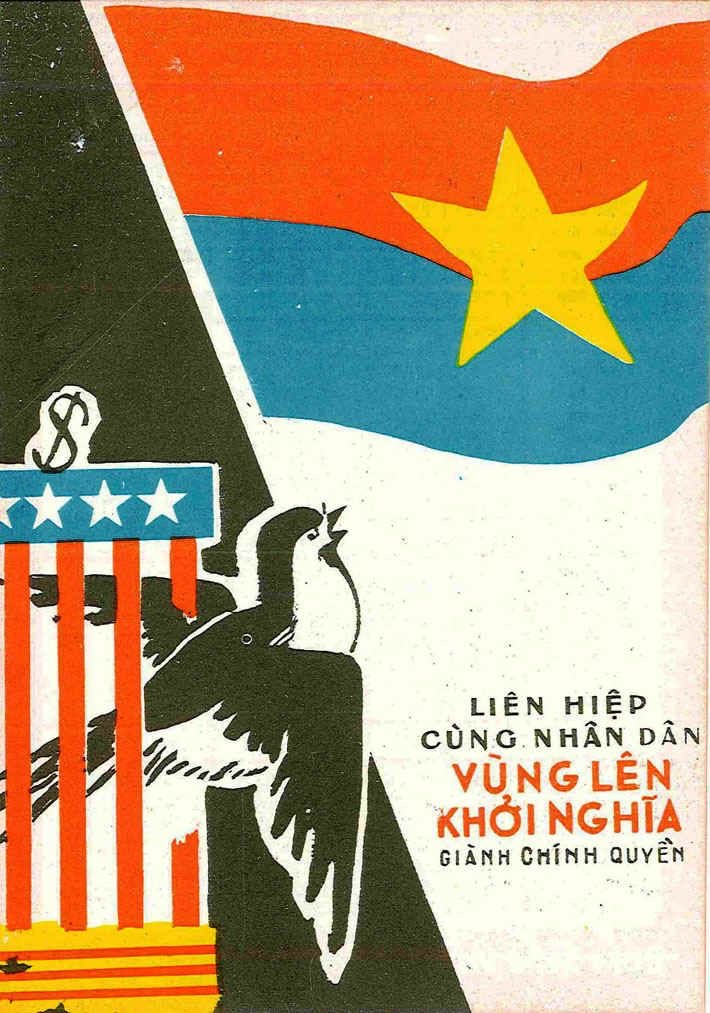
Viet Cong propaganda poster calling for uprising, targeting the United States, South Vietnam, and capitalism.

In the 20th century, the Soviet Union represented itself as the foremost enemy of imperialism, thus the Kremlin gave political and financial support to Third World revolutionary organisations who fought for national independence. This was accomplished through the export of both financial capital and Soviet military apparatuses, with the Soviet Union sending military advisors to China, (Note: Such as Vasily Blyukher from 1924 to 1927.) Vietnam, Ethiopia, Angola, Egypt and Afghanistan.

However, anarchists as well as many other Marxist organizations, have characterized Soviet foreign policy as imperialism and cited it as evidence that the philosophy of Marxism would not resolve and eliminate imperialism. Mao Zedong developed the theory that the Soviet Union was a social imperialist nation, a socialist people with tendencies to imperialism, an important aspect of Maoist analysis of the history of the Soviet Union. Contemporarily, the term "anti-imperialism" is most commonly applied by Marxist-Leninists and by political organisations of like ideological persuasion who oppose capitalism, present a class analysis of society and the like.

About the nature of imperialism and how to oppose and defeat it, Che Guevara said:

imperialism is a world system, the last stage of capitalism—and it must be defeated in a world confrontation. The strategic end of this struggle should be the destruction of imperialism. Our share, the responsibility of the exploited and underdeveloped of the world, is to eliminate the foundations of imperialism: our oppressed nations, from where they extract capitals, raw materials, technicians, and cheap labor, and to which they export new capitals—instruments of domination—arms and all kinds of articles; thus submerging us in an absolute dependence.

— Che Guevara, Message to the Tricontinental, 1967

==== Trotskyism ====
The concept of permanent war economy originated in 1945 with an article by Trotskyist Ed Sard (alias Frank Demby, Walter S. Oakes, and T.N. Vance), a theoretician who predicted a post-war arms race. He argued at the time that the United States would retain the character of a war economy; even in peacetime, US military expenditure would remain large, reducing the percentage of unemployed compared to the 1930s. He extended this analysis in 1950 and 1951.

The concept has been a core tenet of the British Socialist Workers Party with founder, Tony Cliff, examining its application to the First World War, American imperialism and colonial empires including Britain, France, and Germany.

=== Islamist anti-imperialism ===
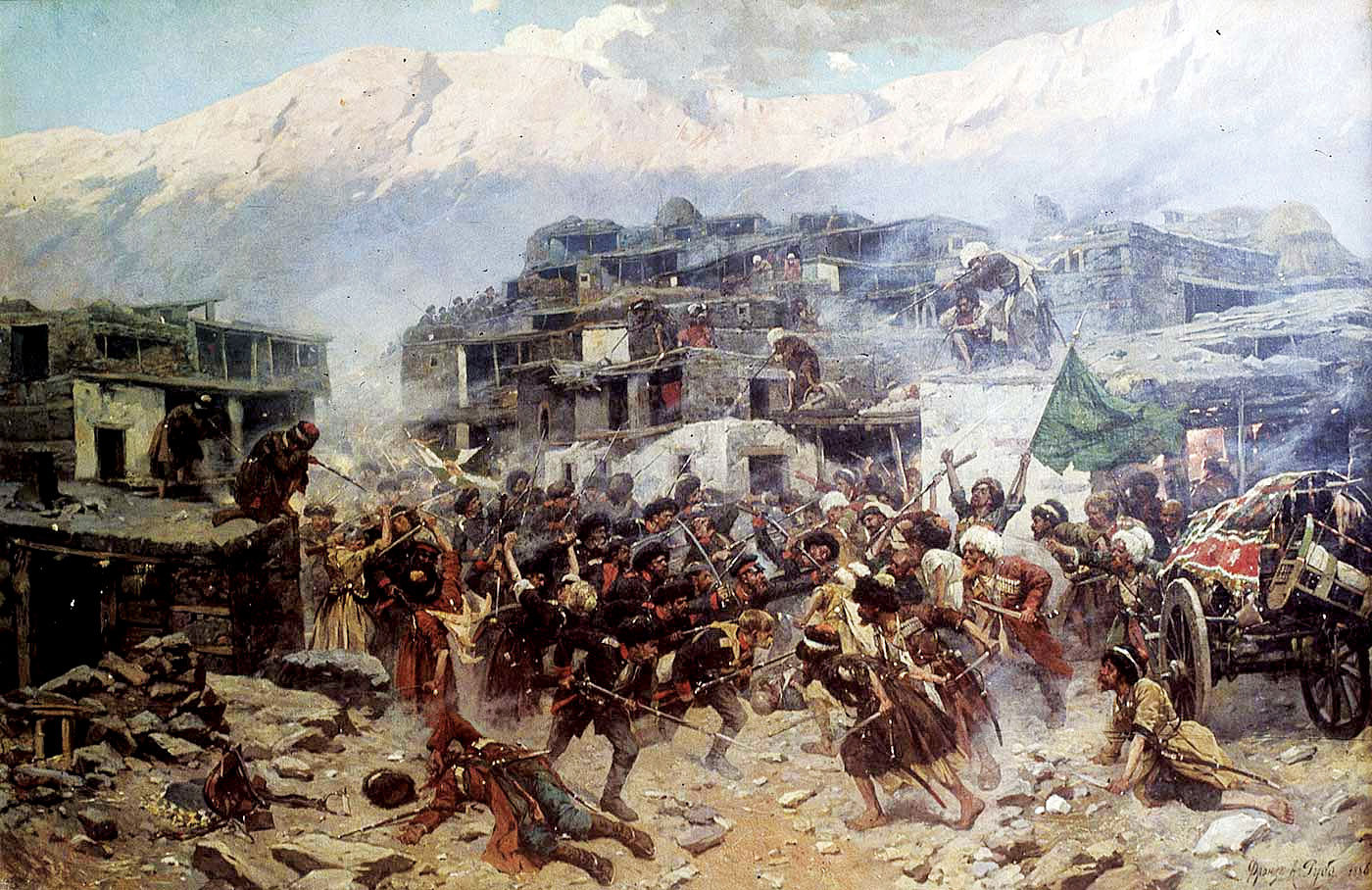
Resistance fighters of Caucasian Mujahidin defend the village of Salta from the invading Russian Imperial Army during the Caucasian War.

The 18th and 19th centuries witnessed the rise of numerous colonial and imperial Islamic resistance movements across various parts of the Muslim World. These included the jihad movement led by the Imamate of Caucasus and the Circassian Confederacy against Russian imperialism during the Caucasus Wars (1763–1864 CE). Prominent leaders in this resistance campaign included Ghazi Mullah, Hamzat Bek, Shamil, Hajji Qerandiqo Berzeg, Jembulat Boletoqo, etc. Other major anti-imperial movements included the Padri War, Java War, the Aceh War against the Dutch colonisation of Indonesia, the Moro Rebellion against the United States, the South Asian Jihad movement of Sayyid Ahmad Shahid, Mahdist State in Sudan, and the Arabian Muwahhidun that fought British colonialism, Emir Abd al-Qadir's military insurgency against French in Algeria, North-West Frontier Uprisings of the Pashtun tribes against the British Raj, Omar Mukhtar's Jihad against Italian Fascists in Libya, etc. The establishment and defense of Islamic statehood that enforces Sharia (Islamic law) based on Qur'an and Sunnah, elimination of superstitions and heterodox local practices and folk rituals, etc. were key objectives of these reform movements.

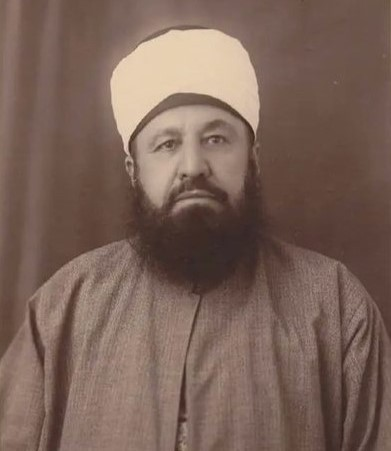
Imam Muhammad Rashid Rida was an ardent advocate of Pan-Islamist insurgency against imperialism. His teachings inspired figures like Hasan al-Banna, Sayyid Qutb and Abdullah Azzam.

These anti-colonial movements inspired the rise of Pan-Islamism during the late 19th century; which gave birth to numerous Islamist organisations advocating anti-imperialism across the Muslim World; such as the Muslim Brotherhood (Ikhwan al-Muslimeen) and Jamaat-e-Islami. Syro-Egyptian Islamist theoretician Muhammad Rashid Rida (1865 CE/1282 AH – 1935 CE/1354 AH), a Salafi theologian greatly influenced by preceding militant Islamic revivalist movements, was an ardent opponent of European imperial powers; and he called for armed jihad to defend the Islamic World from encroaching colonialism, complemented by a political programme to establish Islamic states which would implement Sharia (Islamic laws). He extended this anti-imperialist campaign to the theological level through the Arab Salafiyya movement; which professed the key theme of returning to the values of Salaf al-Salih. This encompassed a theological assault on Western ideological currents emanating from the principles of secularism and nationalism as well as denunciation of Western cultural imperialism.

After Rashid Rida, the mantle of Islamist anti-imperialism was spearheaded by the Egyptian Muslim Brotherhood founder Hasan al-Banna, South Asian revolutionary Islamist leader Sayyid Abul A'la Maududi and Egyptian Jihadist theoretician Sayyid Qutb. Mawdudi held the belief that West was in decline and that restoration of Islamic prowess was inevitable. Openly equating Western colonialism with atheism, Mawdudi called upon Muslims to rally in jihad against the imperialist forces to regain their spiritual, cultural, economic and military sovereignty and self-sufficiency. Sayyid Qutb, an Egyptian scholar influenced by both Mawdudi and Rashid Rida, took their ideas to its logical culmination; proclaiming the necessity of a permanent, unending Islamist revolution not only against the imperialists but also its allied regimes in the Muslim World. This revolution against the apostate regimes has to be waged as an armed jihad by an ideological vanguard committed to establish the Islamic state and uphold Tawhid (Islamic monotheism). These ideas gained prominence and arose in influence across the Islamic World during the post-World War II era. During the Cold War period, the Islamist intellectuals from the Muslim Brotherhood and Jamaat-e Islami also launched fervent anti-communist campaigns, ideologically critiquing socialism and Marxism, and chiding leftists as agents of Soviet Imperialism. In his book "Al Jihad Fil Islam," South Asian revolutionary Islamist scholar Abul A'la Mawdudi made a comprehensive religious refutation of imperialism. He argued that oppressive rulers justify imperialism in the name of progress and socio-political reforms. Describing the main features of imperialism, Mawdudi wrote:

"the basic quality of imperialism is the dominance of one particular nation or country....Thus, the doors of imperialism remain closed to people of other nationalities and for this reason, they can play no major role in running its affairs. This gives rise to the development of other faults in the system and characters of the subject nation. They develop a weakness of character, lose self-esteem and the sense of righteousness. Even if the ruling nation does not treat the subjects with outright cruelty and arrogance, their (the subject nation’s) character sinks to such a low ebb of ignobility that they become quite incapable of striving for attaining and maintaining self-rule for a very long time."

— Abul A'la Maududi, Al Jihad fil Islam,

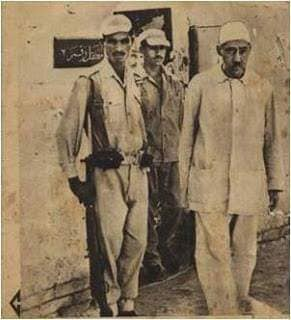
According to the Egyptian Jihadist theoretician Sayyid Qutb, the imperialism of secular Western powers was a by-product of their historical Crusading spirit and driven by ideological differences.

The Indian Jamaat-e-Islami Hind launched a 10-day nationwide campaign titled Anti-Imperialism Campaign in December 2009. Contemporary Jihadist movements such as Al-Qaeda, influenced by Sayyid Qutb's thought, declares itself as a "global revolutionary vanguard" waging jihad to defend Muslims from atrocities committed by the forces of Western imperialism and its allies.

In the worldview of Egyptian Jihadist theoretician Sayyid Qutb, imperialist policies of the secular Western regimes were a continuation of their historical "Crusading Spirit." In his commentary of the Qur'anic verse 2:120 "{Never will the Jews be pleased with you, (O Prophet), nor the Christians until you follow their way...}," Sayyid Qutb writes:

"The conflict between the Judeo-Christian world on the one side, and the Muslim community on the other, remains in essence one of ideology, although over the years it has appeared in various guises and has grown more sophisticated and, at times, more insidious. We have seen the original ideological conflict succeeded by economic, political and military confrontation, on the basis that 'religious' or 'ideological' conflicts are outdated and are usually prosecuted by 'fanatics' and backward people. Unfortunately, some naïve and confused Muslims have fallen for this stratagem and persuaded themselves that the religious and ideological aspects of the conflict are no longer relevant. But in reality world Zionism and Christian Imperialism, as well as world Communism, are conducting the fight against Islam and the Muslim community, first and foremost, on ideological grounds... The confrontation is not over control of territory or economic resources, or for military domination. If we believe that, we would play into our enemies’ hands and would have no one but ourselves to blame for the consequences."

— Sayyid Qutb, Fi Zilal al-Quran,

=== Right-wing anti-imperialism ===
The anti-imperialist movement has generally been linked to left-wing politics, but some right-wing conservatives, nationalists, anti-globalists and religious fundamentalists that have emerged in reaction to alleged imperialism might also fall within this category.

Iran's right-wing anti-imperialism is often linked to anti-Americanism and anti-Zionism; Iranian principlists historically derived much of its popularity from its appeal to widespread anger at American intervention or influence. American paleoconservatives denounce neoconservatives as "imperialists" and support anti-imperialist views to defend traditionalist, American nationalist values and republicanism.

Chiang Kai-shek was a right-wing authoritarian nationalist, but supported anti-imperialist foreign policy that antagonized the Japan, Soviet and West, and he supported decolonization of Asia until 1949, but after the Great Retreat, anti-imperialist policies were effectively abandoned, adopting an anti-communist pro-Western diplomatic line that relied diplomatically on the United States and Japan. Unlike classical fascists (Italian fascists and Nazis) with imperialistic elements, some neo-fascists—such as the Azov Brigade and the Russian Volunteer Corps—oppose imperialism, particularly Russian imperialism, as an extension of their anti-communist opposition to the legacy of the Soviet Union.

== Political movement ==
As a self-conscious political movement, anti-imperialism originated in Europe in the late 19th and early 20th centuries in opposition to the growing European colonial empires and the United States control of the Philippines after 1898. However, it reached its highest level of popular support in the colonies themselves, where it formed the basis for a wide variety of national liberation movements during the mid-20th century and later. These movements, and their anti-imperialist ideas, were instrumental in the decolonization process of the 1950s and 1960s, which saw most European colonies in Asia and Africa achieving their independence.

== By country ==
=== United States ===
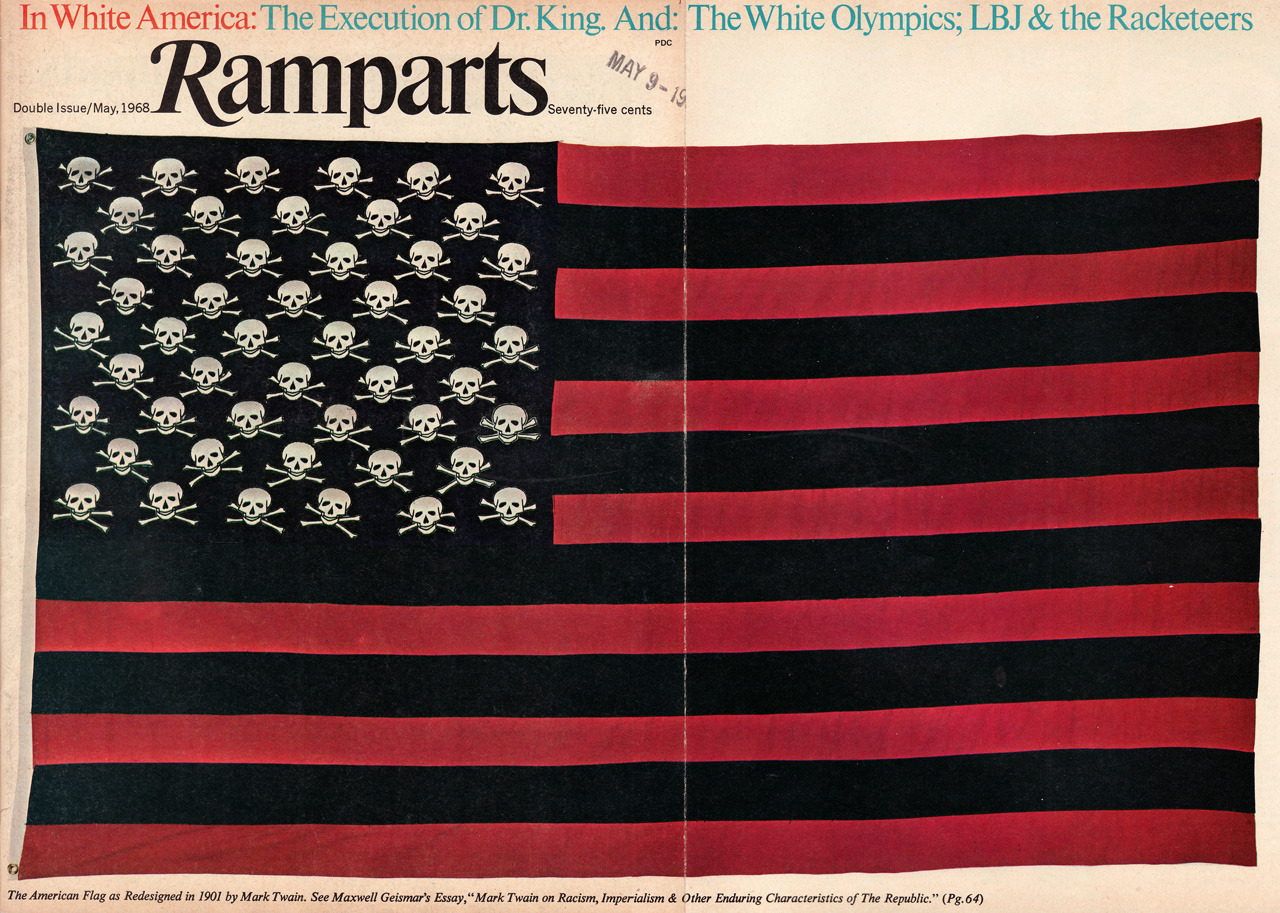
In 1901, Mark Twain wrote a satirical essay titled To the Person Sitting in Darkness, in which he expressed strong anti-imperialist views against certain ongoing conflicts such as the Philippine-American War. At one point, Twain sarcastically described what the flag of an American-controlled Philippines should look like; "And as for a flag for the Philippine Province, it is easily managed. We can have a special one—our States do it: we can have just our usual flag, with the white stripes painted black and the stars replaced by the skull and cross-bones."

An early use of the term "anti-imperialist" occurred after the United States entered the Spanish–American War in 1898. Most activists supported the war itself, but opposed the annexation of new territory, especially the Philippines. The Anti-Imperialist League was founded on June 15, 1898, in Boston in opposition of the acquisition of the Philippines, which would happen anyway. The anti-imperialists opposed the expansion because they believed imperialism violated the credo of republicanism, especially the need for "consent of the governed." Appalled by American imperialism, the Anti-Imperialist League, which included famous citizens such as Andrew Carnegie, Henry James, William James and Mark Twain, formed a platform which stated:

We hold that the policy known as imperialism is hostile to liberty and tends toward militarism, an evil from which it has been our glory to be free. We regret that it has become necessary in the land of Washington and Lincoln to reaffirm that all men, of whatever race or color, are entitled to life, liberty and the pursuit of happiness. We maintain that governments derive their just powers from the consent of the governed. We insist that the subjugation of any people is "criminal aggression" and open disloyalty to the distinctive principles of our Government... We cordially invite the cooperation of all men and women who remain loyal to the Declaration of Independence and the Constitution of the United States.

Fred Harrington states that "the anti-imperialist's did not oppose expansion because of commercial, religious, constitutional, or humanitarian reasons but instead because they thought that an imperialist policy ran counter to the political doctrines of the Declaration of Independence, Washington's Farewell Address, and Lincoln's Gettysburg Address."

The American rejection of the League of Nations in 1919 was accompanied with a sharp American reaction against European imperialism. American textbooks denounced imperialism as a major cause of the World War. The uglier aspects of British colonial rule were emphasized, recalling the long-standing anti-British sentiments in the United States.

=== United Kingdom and Canada ===
Anti-imperialism within Britain emerged in the 1890s, especially from within the Liberal Party. For over a century, back to the days of Adam Smith in 1776, economists had been hostile to imperialism on the grounds that it is a violation of the principles of free trade; they never formed a popular movement. Indeed, imperialism seems to have been generally popular before the 1890s. The key impetus around 1900 came from strong public disapproval with the British actions during the Second Boer War (1899–1902). The war was fought against the Afrikaners, who were Dutch colonists who had built new homelands in South Africa. Opposition to the Second Boer War was modest when the war began and was generally less widespread than support for it. However, influential groups formed immediately against the war, including the South African Conciliation Committee and W. T. Stead's Stop the War Committee. Much of the opposition in the United Kingdom came from the Liberal Party. Intellectuals and activists in United Kingdom based in the socialist, labour and Fabian movements generally oppose imperialism and John A. Hobson, a Liberal, took many of his ideas from their writings. After the Boer war, opponents of imperialism turned their attention to the British crown colonies in Africa and Asia. By the 1920s, the government was sponsoring large-scale exhibits promoting imperialism, notably the 1924 British Empire Exhibition in London and the 1938 Glasgow Empire Exhibition. Some intellectuals used the opportunity to criticise imperialism as a policy.

Moderately active anti-imperial movements emerged in Canada and Australia. The French Canadians were hostile to British expansion whilst in Australia, it was the Irish Catholics who were opposed. French Canadians argue that Canadian nationalism was the proper and true goal and it sometimes conflicted with loyalty to the British Empire. Many French Canadians claimed that they would fight for Canada but would not fight for the Empire.

Protestant Canadians, typically of British descent, generally supported British imperialism enthusiastically. They sent thousands of volunteers to fight alongside British and imperial forces against the Boers and in the process identified themselves even more strongly with the British Empire. A little opposition also came from some English immigrants such as the intellectual leader Goldwin Smith. In Canada, the Irish Catholics were fighting the French Canadians for control of the Catholic Church, so the Irish generally supported the pro-British position. Anti-imperialism also grew rapidly in India and formed a core element of the demand by Congress for independence.

=== Soviet Union ===
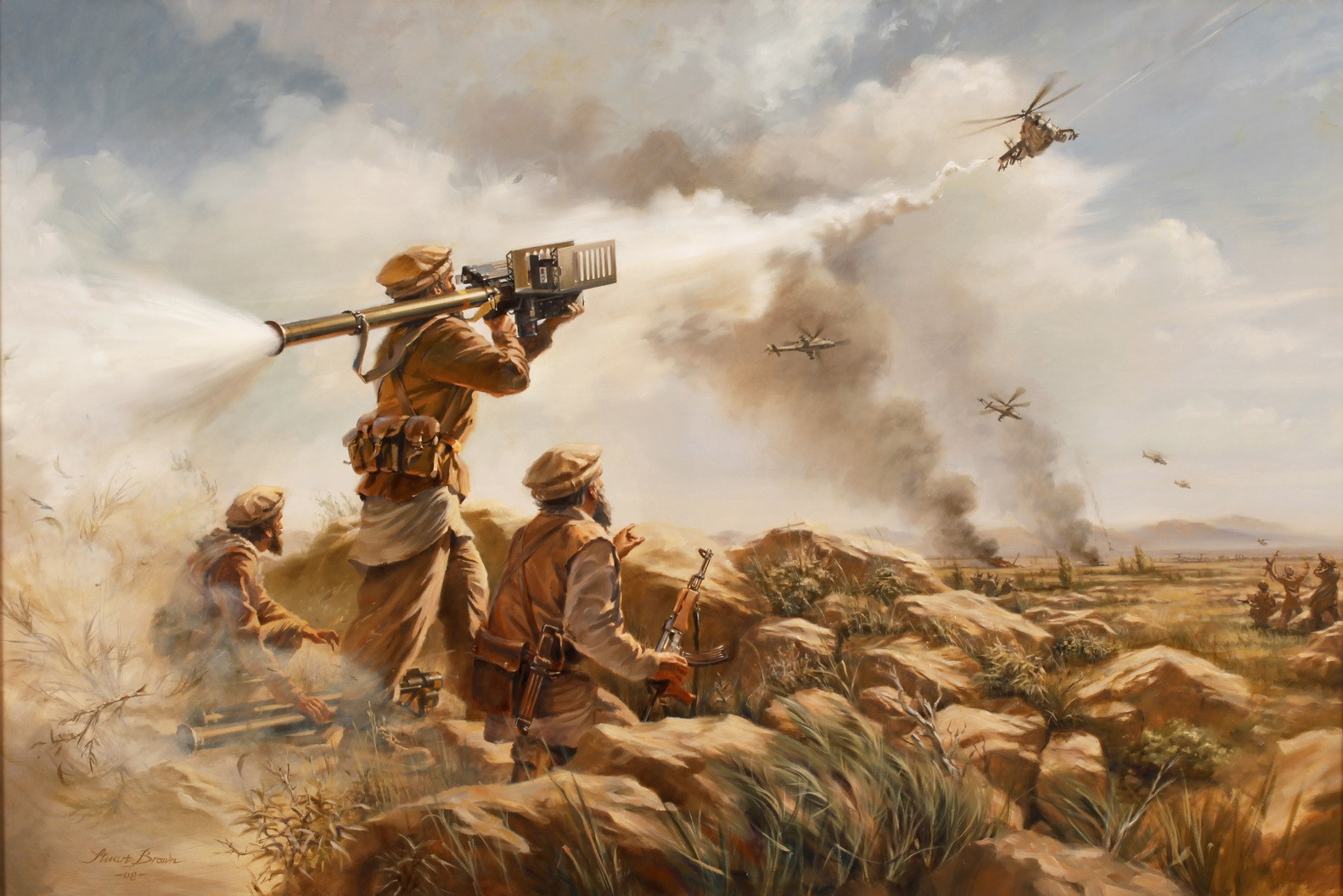
Depiction of the first shoot-down of Soviet helicopter gunships by the Afghan mujahideen using Western-supplied Stinger Missiles, widely regarded as the turning point in the Soviet-Afghan War

The nations which were part of the Soviet sphere of influence were nominally independent countries with separate governments that set their own policies, but those policies had to stay within certain limits decided by the Soviet Union. These limits were enforced by the threat of intervention by Soviet forces, and later the Warsaw Pact. Major military invasions took place in East Germany in 1953, Hungary in 1956, Czechoslovakia in 1968 and Afghanistan from 1979 to 1989. Countries in the Eastern Bloc were considered satellite states.

The Soviet Union exhibited tendencies common to historic empires. The notion of "Soviet empire" often refers to a form of "classic" or "colonial" empire with communism only replacing conventional imperial ideologies such as Christianity or monarchy, rather than creating a revolutionary state. Academically the idea is seen as emerging with Richard Pipes' 1957 book The Formation of the Soviet Union: Communism and Nationalism, 1917–1923, but it has been reinforced, along with several other views, in continuing scholarship. Several scholars hold that the Soviet Union was a hybrid entity containing elements common to both multinational empires and nation states. According to some historians, the Soviet Union practiced colonialism similar to conventional imperial powers.

=== South Korea ===
South Korean liberals have opposed Chinese and Japanese imperialism. The No Japan Movement is related to anti-imperialist sentiment in South Korea. On August 14, 2019, seven politicians of the DPK's descendants of independence activists said at a press conference, "In the spirit of Great Korean Independence 100 years ago, let's overcome the economic invasion of Shinzo Abe's government." (100년 전 대한독립의 정신으로 아베 정부 경제침략을 이겨내자.) South Korean liberals, unlike protectionist anti-imperialists, believing that the Japanese government's actions that undermined the "free trade principle" (자유무역 원칙 or 자유무역 철칙) during the Japan–South Korea trade dispute were far-right imperialist "economic invasion". (South Korean liberals argue that the Japanese government caused unfair damage to the South Korean economy to avoid compensation for Korean victims of Japanese war crimes during the past imperialist Japan.) South Korean liberals also oppose the appropriation of Korean culture by Chinese people.

== Criticism ==
Antonio Negri and Michael Hardt assert that traditional anti-imperialism is no longer relevant. In the book Empire, Negri and Hardt argue that imperialism is no longer the practice or domain of any one nation or state. Rather, they claim, the "Empire" is a conglomeration of all states, nations, corporations, media, popular and intellectual culture and so forth; and thus, traditional anti-imperialist methods and strategies can no longer be applied against them.

The Estonian political scientist Maria Mälksoo argues that a blind spot in postcolonial studies linked to anti-imperialist movements is that they often ignore Russian imperialism and colonialism.

== See also ==
- Anti-Americanism
- Anti-British sentiment
- Anti-Chinese sentiment
  - Anti–People's Republic of China sentiment
- Anti-French sentiment
- Anti-Japanese sentiment
- Anti-Russian sentiment
- Anti-Western sentiment
- Anti-communism
- Anti-fascism
- Colonialism
- Decentralization
- Historiography of the British Empire
- Indigenism
  - Indigenismo
- Internationalism (politics)
- Irish nationalism (Irish republicanism)
- Korean nationalism
  - Anti-Chinese sentiment in Korea
  - Anti-Japanese sentiment in Korea
- League against Imperialism
- Left-wing nationalism
- Localism (politics)
- National liberation wars
- National self-determination
- Postcolonialism
- Stateless nation
