= Caliphs and Kings =

Caliphs and Kings is the title or partial title of several books:

- The Book of Gold Moulded in the Format of the Report of the Caliphs and Kings Who Performed the Ḥajj (1438), by al-Maqrizi, medieval Egyptian historian
- Caliphs and Kings, possible translation of Khilafat o Malukiyat (1985) by Abul A'la Maududi
- Caliphs and Kings: The Art and Influence of Islamic Spain (2004), by Heather Ecker, published by the Arthur M. Sackler Gallery
- Caliphs and Kings: Spain, 796–1031 (2012), by Roger Collins, part of Wiley-Blackwell's series on the history of Spain
