= Zafar Ishaq Ansari =

Pakistani scholar of Islamic studies (1932–2016)

Zafar Ishaq Ansari (Urdu: ﻇﻔﺮ اسحاق انصاﺭﻯ; 27 December 1932 – 24 April 2016) was a scholar of Islamic studies. He was the Director General of the Islamic Research Institute of the International Islamic University. Previously, he was the president of the International Islamic University in Islamabad.

== Education and early life ==
Born in Allahabad, British India, Ansari obtained his M.A. and PhD from the Institute of Islamic Studies, McGill University, Montreal, Canada in 1966. His main thesis for his PhD program was titled "The Early Development of Fiqh in Kufah with special reference to the works of Abu Yusuf and Shaybani".

== Academic career ==
He was the editor of the quarterly journal Islamic Studies.

== Publications ==
His books and articles include:

- Islamic Perspectives: Studies in Honour of Sayyid Abul A'la Mawdudi, edited by K. Ahmad and Z.I. Ansari, Leicester, UK, 1979.
- Living Religions of the World: A Socio-Political Study, A. Al-Masdousi, translated into English (Karachi, 1962).
- Towards Understanding the Qur'an, vols. 1–10 and the last part (Juz' 'Amma – surahs 78-114), English rendering of Sayyid Abu A`la Mawdudi, Tafhim al-Qur'an (Leicester, 1988–2010). (Ten volumes have been published so far).
- Towards Understanding the Qur'an Abridged Version (Leicester: 2006).
- "Muslims and the West: Encounter" (Islamabad and Washington DC; 2001), Edited, in collaboration with John L. Esposito,.
- "Taftazani's Views on Taklif, Jabr and Qadar": A Note on the Development of Islamic Theology Arabica, Tome XVI, fasc. 1 (Leiden, 1969), pp. 65–78; and Tome XVII, fasc. 3 (1970), pp. 309–311.
- "Early Islamic Juristic Terminology", Arabica, Tome XIX (Leiden, 1972), pp. 255–300.
- "Some Reflections on the Qur'anic Legal Verses", Hamdard Islamicus, vol. IV, no. 2 (Summer 1981), pp. 13–29.
- "The Authenticity of Traditions: A Critique of Joseph Schacht's Argument e Silentio", Hamdard Islamicus, vol.VII, no. 2 (Summer 1984), pp. 51–56.
- "An Early Discussion on Islamic Jurisprudence: Some Notes on al-Radd 'al-Siyar al-Awza'i ", a chapter in Islamic Perspectives: Studies in Honour of Sayyid Abul A'la Mawdudi (Leicester, U.K. 1979), pp. 147–167.
- "Contemporary Islam and Nationalism: A Case Study of Egypt", Die Welt des Islams, N.S. vol. VII, nr. 1-4 (Leiden, 1961), pp. 3–38.
- "Islam and Nationalism in Egypt—The Earlier Developments", Pakistan Horizon, vol. XII (1959), pp. 230–247.
- "Egyptian Nationalism vis-á-vis Islam", Pakistan Horizon, vol. XIII (1960), pp. 21–47.
- "The Sanusi Movement", Proceedings of the First International Conference of the Historians of Asia (The Philippines, Historical Association, 1962), pp. 129–152.
- "Some Reflections on Islamic Bases for Dialogue with Jews and Christians", Journal of Ecumenical Studies, vol. 14 (1977), pp. 433–447.
- "Sayyid Abul A'la Mawdudi: An Introduction to his Vision of Islam and Islamic Revival", in collaboration with K. Ahmad, a chapter in Islamic Perspectives, op. cit., pp. 359–383.
- "Non-Muslims in the Ottoman Empire", Iqbal (Lahore, October 1962).
- "Al-Ghazali and Islamic Government", Voice of Islam, vol. VII (Karachi, 1959).
- "Iqbal and Nationalism", Iqbal Review, vol. II (Karachi, 1961), pp. 51–89.
- "Shah Wali Allah and Fiqhi Disagreements", Iqbal (Lahore, January 1967), pp. 44–52.
- "Ummah in the Qur'an", Islamic Education (Lahore, 1969).
- "The National Socialism of the Arab Ba'th Socialist Party", Chiragh-i Rah (Karachi, December 1967), pp. 375–392. (In Urdu).
- "Abu Hanifah", Encyclopædia Britannica, rev. edition, 1974.
- "Al-Muslimun wa al-øa÷òrah al-hadithah", in al-Wa`y al-Islami (Kuwait, November 1968). (In Arabic).
- "Truth, Revelation and Obedience", Christian-Muslim Dialogue: Papers from Broumana, 1972 (Geneva, 1973), pp. 80–86.
- "Aspects of Black Muslim Theology", Studia Islamica, Fasciculo LIII (1981), pp. 137–176.
- "Muslims in the South Pacific: A Study of the Muslim Communities in Australia, New Zealand and Fiji".
- "The Historical Background of the Contemporary Islamic Renaissance", The Proceedings of the Annual Convention of the Muslim Students' Association of America and Canada, Bloomington, Indiana, May 1977 in Al-Attihad: A Quarterly of Islamic Studies, vol. 15, no. 4 (October 1979), pp. 7–13.
- "Philosophy of Water Reuse in Islamic Perspective", with S. Farooq, Desalination, vol. 39 (1981), pp. 273–281.
- "Islamic Studies in Universities: A Critical Evaluation," Muslim Education Quarterly, vol. I, no. 2 (Winter 1984), pp. 13–38.
- "The Religious Doctrines of the Black Muslims of America, 1934–74", Islamic Order, vol. 7, no. 2 (1985), pp. 17–47.
- "W. D. Muhammad: The Making of a "Black Muslim" Leader, (1933–1961)", American Journal of Islamic Social Sciences, vol. 2, no. 2 (1985), pp. 245–262.
- "Hijrah in the Islamic Tradition" in E. Anderson and N.H. Dupree, eds., The Cultural Basis of Afghan Nationalism (London, Pinter,1990), pp. 3–20.
- "The Significance of Shafi'i's Criticism of the Medinese Jurists", Islamic Studies, vol. 30, no. 4 (Winter 1991), pp. 485–499.
- "The Contribution of the Qur'an and the Prophet to the Development of Islamic Fiqh", Journal of Islamic Studies, vol. 3, no. 2 (July 1992), pp. 141–171.
- "Sawm" and "Abu Hanifah", articles in The Encyclopedia of Religions.
- "Scientific Exegesis of the Qur'an", Journal of Qur'anic Studies, vol. 3:1 (2001), pp. 90–104.

== See also ==
- List of Pakistanis
- Towards Understanding the Qur'an
