= Khutabat: Fundamentals of Islam =

1988 book by Maududi

- Author: Sayyid Abul Ala Maududi
- Publisher: Kazi Publications
- Publication date: 1988
- ISBN: 0-935782-09-5

Khutabat: Fundamentals of Islam is a book written by Sayyid Abul Ala Maududi. It was originally published in 1988, then later re-translated and published under the title Let Us Be Muslims.
