= Mawdudi and the Making of Islamic Revivalism =

Book by Seyyed Vali Reza Nasr

Mawdudi and the Making of Islamic Revivalism is a book by Seyyed Vali Reza Nasr, which aims to evaluate the impact of Sayyid Abul Ala Maududi on the Indian subcontinent as well as modern Islamic revivalism as a whole.

== See also ==
- Islamism
