= The Rights of Minorities in the Islamic State =

Book

- Author: Sayyid Abul Ala Maududi
- Original title: Islami riyasat main zimmiun ke huquq
- Language: Urdu
- Genre: Non-fiction
- Publication date: 1954
- Publication place: Pakistan

The Rights of Minorities in the Islamic State (Urdu: Islami riyasat main zimmiun ke huquq) is a book written by Sayyid Abul Ala Maududi, published in Lahore, Pakistan in 1954.

In it Maududi references the millet system and its organization along communal lines as a possible way the Islamic state would deal with minority rights according to the sharia concept of dhimma.
