= Pardah (book) =

1940 Islamic Urdu book

- Author: Abul A'la Maududi
- Language: Urdu
- Subject: Veiling in Islam
- Genre: Religion
- Publisher: Islamic Publications (Private) Limited, Lahore
- Publication date: 1940-03-01
- Publication place: British India
- Media type: Print (hardcover and paperback)
- Pages: 304

Pardah (Urdu: پردہ) is an Islamic Urdu book by Pakistani scholar Abul A'la Maududi. The book was originally published in 1940. It has been translated into several languages and is considered one of the best sellers of the author.

== Synopsis ==
The book makes a case for the significance and obligation of pardah (Hijab, Veil) for Muslim women. The author presents his views on the matter by comparing the status of women in ancient civilizations and modern Western culture with the Islamic civilization. While the central idea of the book is veiling, the book gives detailed accounts of the social norms of Islam and the mutual relationship between men and women in general.

== Criticism ==
The book has been criticized for its strict stance on the verdict of veiling and some left-wing intellectuals accuse it of causing potential extremism regarding the role of women in Muslim societies.

Pardah was one of the books of Maududi that were banned by the Saudi government in 2015.
