= Tafhim-ul-Quran =

1972 Islamic commentary by Sayyid Abul Ala Maududi

Tafhim-ul-Quran تفہيم القرآن
- Set of 6 volumes
- Author: Abul A'la Maududi
- Genre: Qur'an commentary; Religious scripture
- Published: 1942 - 1972
- Publisher: Idara Tarjuman ul Qur'an, Lahore

Tafhim-ul-Quran (Urdu: تفہيم القرآن, romanized: Tafheem-ul-Quran, lit. 'Towards Understanding the Quran') is a 6-volume translation and commentary of the Qur'an by the Pakistani scholar Syed Abul Ala Maududi. Maududi began writing the book in 1942 and completed it in 1972.

Tafhim is derived from the Arabic word fahm which means "understanding". Tafhim-ul-Quran is a combination of orthodox and modernist interpretation. It discusses economics, sociology, history, and politics. In his text, Maududi highlights Quranic perspective and says that Islam provides ample guidance in all spheres. Maududi uses the standard technique of providing an explanation of the Quranic verses from the Sunnah of the prophet Muhammad, including the historical reasons behind the verses. In 1979 he was awarded the King Faisal International Award for his service to Islam.

The Tafhim deals extensively with issues faced by the modern world in general and the Muslim community in particular.

Maududi wrote his work in Urdu. It has since been translated to languages including English, Hindi, Bengali, Malayalam, Marathi, Pashto and Sindhi. In 2006, the Islamic Foundation published an abridged one-volume English translation by Zafar Ishaq Ansari under the title Towards Understanding the Qur'an.
