= Qadiyani Problem =

1953 book by Abul A'la Mawdudi

- Author: Abul A'la Maududi
- Language: Urdu
- Genre: Non-fiction
- Publisher: Islamic Publications
- Publication date: 1953
- Publication place: Pakistan

Qadiyani Problem (Urdu: قادیانی مسئلہ, romanized: Qadiyānī Masaʾla) is a 1953 book written by Pakistani scholar Abul A'la Mawdudi. "Qadiyani" is a slur used to attack members of the Ahmadiyya movement.

== Synopsis ==
The book deals with some of the interpretations of Mirza Ghulam Ahmad who claimed to be a prophet. It discusses the finality of prophethood, the claimed prophethood of Ahmad, and its consequences in Muslim society. It also mentions the status of the Ahmadiyya Community and the political plans which Maududi associated with them. In one of the appendices of the book, a discussion has been given which is claimed to have occurred between Muhammad Iqbal and Jawaharlal Nehru. In this discussion Allama Iqbal is said to have expressed his views regarding followers of Mirza Ghulam Ahmad and have rationalised his view that followers of Mirza Ghulam Ahmad be given a status of a different religious community in India.

== Reception ==
A comprehensive rebuttal was published by the second Ahmadiyya leader at the time because the book was considered to be hate speech by the Ahmadiyya community.

== Legacy ==
In 1953, Maududi and his Jamat e Islami party participated in a campaign against the Ahmadiyya community in Pakistan, joined by traditionalist ulama who wanted Ahmadi Muslims designated as non-Muslims. Ahmadis such as Muhammad Zafarullah Khan sacked from all high level government positions, and intermarriage between Ahmadi Muslims and other Muslims prohibited. The campaign generated riots in Lahore, leading to the deaths of at least 2000 Ahmadis, and selective declaration of martial law.

Maududi was arrested by the military deployment headed by Lieutenant General Azam Khan and sentenced to death for his part in the agitation. However, the anti-Ahmadi campaign enjoyed much popular support, and strong public pressure ultimately convinced the government to release him after two years of imprisonment. According to academic Vali Nasr, Maududi's unapologetic and impassive stance after being sentenced, ignoring advice to ask for clemency, had an "immense" effect on his supporters. It was seen as a "victory of Islam over un-Islam", proof of his leadership and staunch faith.

== Bibliography ==
- Nasr, Seyyed Vali Reza (1996). Mawdudi and the Making of Islamic Revivalism. Oxford University Press. ISBN 9780195096958.
