= System of Government Under the Holy Prophet =

Book by Sayyid Abul Ala Maududi

System of Government Under the Holy Prophet is a book written by Sayyid Abul Ala Maududi.
