= Islamic Law and Constitution =

1955 book

Islamic Law and its Introduction in Pakistan
- Author: Sayyid Abul Ala Maududi
- Subject: Pakistan, Islamic Law
- Publisher: Islamic Publications
- Publication date: 1955

Islamic Law and its Introduction in Pakistan is a book written by Sayyid Abul Ala Maududi and was originally published in 1955 and reprinted in 1983.

This book discusses the step by step introduction of Islamic law i.e. Sharia in Pakistan and its possible impact. It also discusses the criticism harsh punishment that are main concern of the opponents. It discusses British civil and criminal procedure codes introduced during the British colonial rule and still enforced in Pakistan. This book discusses Sharia in detail and its implementation in the modern world.

== Versions ==
- The first edition, Lahore: Islamic Publications, 1955.
- The second edition, Lahore: Islamic Publications, 1960.
- The third edition, Lahore: Islamic Publications, 1970.
- The fourth edition, Lahore: Islamic Publications, 1983.
