= Economic System of Islam =

Book by Sayyid Abul Ala Maududi

Economic System of Islam is a book written by Sayyid Abul Ala Maududi, noted for his rejection of capitalism as un-Islamic.
