= Towards Understanding Islam =

1932 book by Abul A'la Maududi

English 1980 Edition

Towards Understanding Islam is a book written by Sayyid Abul Ala Maududi which gained its author a reputation as a religious teacher and major thinker. This book has been translated into a number of languages. Jamaat-e-Islami claims that it has been translated into 13 languages. One English translation of this book is by Prof. Khurshid Ahmad.

Under the subtitle Editor's Introduction in November 1979 Prof. Kurshid Ahmad tries to introduce the book: "Originally written in 1932 in Urdu, under the title Risala-e-Diniyat, the book was intended as a textbook for students of the higher classes and for the general public. It served an important need and became a popular Islamic reader. Most of the schools and colleges of the South Asia adopted it as a textbook in theology and made its study a part of their curricula. It has been translated into many of the world's languages, including: English, Arabic, Hindi (titled as इस्लाम धर्म), Persian, German, French, Italian, Turkish, Portuguese, Swahili, Indonesian, Japanese, Malayalam, Tamil, Pashto, Balochi, Bengali, Gujarati and Sindhi. It is also translated in Telugu, Kannada, Marathi and Albanian."

== Description ==
Mawdudi argues that Islam is about much more than daily rituals and habits, and that it is to be regarded as a dynamic system for the whole of life. The purpose of the book is to provide both Muslims and non-Muslims with a brief but comprehensive view of Islam. The book also tries to provide a rational basis for Islamic beliefs.

== About the author ==
Sayyid Abul Ala Maududi (1903-1979), one of the chief architects of the contemporary Islamic resurgence, was a prominent Islamic thinker and writer of his time. He devoted his entire life to expounding the meaning and message of Islam and to organizing a collective movement to establish the Islamic Order.

In this struggle, he had to pass through all kinds of suffering. Between (1948-1967), he was put behind bars on four occasions, spending a total of five years in different prisons in Pakistan. In 1953, he was also sentenced to death by a Martial Law Court for writing a "seditious" pamphlet, this sentence being later commuted to life imprisonment. In 1941, he founded Jamaat-e-Islami, of which he remained Amir until 1972 and which is one of the most prominent Islamic movements today. He authored more than one hundred works on Islam, both scholarly and popular, and his writings have been translated into more than forty languages.
