= Islamic Way of Life =

1948 book by Sayyid Abul Ala Maududi

Islamic Way of Life (Urdu: Islam Ka Nizam Hayat) is a book written by prominent Muslim Sayyid Abul Ala Maududi in Lahore, 1948.

== Editions ==
- Publisher: Islamic Foundation (UK) reprint of 2001, Pages: 80 Binding: Paperback
