= Cairo Declaration on Human Rights in Islam =

1990 declaration of OIC states

- Signed: August 5, 1990
- Location: Cairo
- Signatories: 45 OIC members
- Language: Arabic

Full text
- Cairo Declaration on Human Rights in Islam at Wikisource

The Cairo Declaration on Human Rights in Islam (CDHRI) is a declaration of the member states of the Organisation of Islamic Cooperation (OIC) first adopted in Cairo, Egypt, on 5 August 1990, (Conference of Foreign Ministers, 9–14 Muharram 1411H in the Islamic calendar), and later revised and adopted on 28 November 2020. It provides an overview on the Islamic perspective on human rights. The 1990 version affirms Islamic sharia as its sole source, whereas the 2020 version does not specifically invoke sharia.

The CDHRI declares its purpose to be "general guidance for Member States [of the OIC] in the field of human rights". This declaration is widely acknowledged as an Islamic response to the United Nations' Universal Declaration of Human Rights (UDHR), adopted in 1948. It guarantees some, but not all, of the UDHR and serves as a living document of human rights guidelines prescribed for all members of the OIC to follow, but restricts them explicitly to the limits set by the sharia. Because of this limit, the CDHRI has been criticized as an attempt to shield OIC member states from international criticism for human rights violations, as well as for failing to guarantee freedom of religion, justifying corporal punishment and allowing discrimination against non-Muslims and women.

== History ==
Various Muslim countries had criticized the 1948 Universal Declaration of Human Rights for its failure to take into account the cultural and religious context of non-Western countries. In 1981, Said Rajaie-Khorassani—the post-revolutionary Iranian representative to the UN—articulated the position of his country regarding the UDHR, by saying that it was a relativistic "secular understanding of the Judeo-Christian tradition", which could not be implemented by Muslims without trespassing Islamic law.

The CDHRI was adopted in 1990 by members of the Organisation of the Islamic Conference. As of 2012, it had been signed by 45 states. In 1992, the CDHRI was presented to the United Nations Commission on Human Rights, where it was strongly condemned by the International Commission of Jurists.

== Contents ==
The Declaration starts by saying "All human beings form one family whose members are united by their subordination to Allah and descent from Adam", and it forbids "discrimination on the basis of race, colour, language, belief, sex, religion, political affiliation, social status or other considerations". It goes on to proclaim the sanctity of life, and declares the "preservation of human life" to be "a duty prescribed by the Shariah". The CDHRI also guarantees non-belligerents—such as old men, women and children, the wounded and sick, and prisoners of war—the right to food, shelter, and access to safety and medical treatment in times of war.

The CDHRI affords women "equal human dignity", "own rights to enjoy", "duties to perform", "own civil entity", "financial independence", and the "right to retain her name and lineage". Both men and women are given the "right to marriage" regardless of their race, colour, or nationality. The Declaration makes it incumbent upon both parents to protect the child, both before and after birth, while stressing that the husband is responsible for the social and financial protection of his family, including any children and wives.

The Declaration recognises the rights to property and privacy for the individuals. The Article 18 (b) says that "Everyone shall have the right to privacy in the conduct of his private affairs, in his home, among his family, with regard to his property and his relationships. It is not permitted to spy on him, to place him under surveillance or to besmirch his good name. The State shall protect him from arbitrary interference". It forbids the demolition and confiscation of any family's residence and the eviction of the family. Furthermore, should the family be separated in times of war, it is the responsibility of the state to "arrange visits or reunions of families".

Article 10 of the Declaration states: "Islam is the religion of unspoiled nature. It is prohibited to exercise any form of compulsion on man or to exploit his poverty or ignorance in order to convert him to another religion or to atheism." Since in Islamic society all reasons for conversion away from Islam are considered to be essentially either compulsion or ignorance, this effectively forbids conversion away from Islam.

The Declaration protects each individual from arbitrary arrest, torture, maltreatment, or indignity. Furthermore, no individual is to be used for medical or scientific experiments without his consent or at the risk of his health or of his life. It also prohibits the taking of hostages of any individual "for any purpose whatsoever". Moreover, the CDHRI guarantees the presumption of innocence; guilt is only to be proven through a trial in "which he [the defendant] shall be given all the guarantees of defence". The Declaration also forbids the promulgation of "emergency laws that would provide executive authority for such actions". Article 19 stipulates that there are no other crimes or punishments than those mentioned in the sharia. Sharia allows corporal punishment (whipping, amputation) and capital punishment by stoning or decapitation. The right to hold public office can only be exercised in accordance with the sharia.

The Declaration also emphasizes the "full right to freedom and self-determination", and its opposition to enslavement, oppression, exploitation, and colonialism. The CDHRI declares the rule of law, establishing "equality and justice for all", with the limitations provided under Islamic law. The CDHRI also guarantees all individuals the "right to participate, directly or indirectly in the administration of his country's public affairs". The CDHRI also forbids any abuse of authority "subject to the Islamic Shariah."

Article 22(a) of the Declaration states that "Everyone shall have the right to express his opinion freely in such manner as would not be contrary to the principles of the Shariah." Article 22(b) states that "Everyone shall have the right to advocate what is right, and propagate what is good, and warn against what is wrong and evil according to the norms of Islamic Shariah." Article 22(c) states: "Information is a vital necessity to society. It may not be exploited or misused in such a way as may violate sanctities and the dignity of Prophets, undermine moral and ethical values or disintegrate, corrupt or harm society, or weaken its faith." This is an explicit restriction on the freedom to make any statement which might be considered blasphemous, the penalty for the making of which might be death and as such the wording of this clause allows the death penalty for blasphemy in clear contravention of the UDHR. Article 22(d) states that "It is not permitted to arouse nationalistic or doctrinal hatred or to do anything that may be an incitement to any form of racial discrimination."

=== Religious features ===
The CDHRI uses a universalist language akin to the Universal Declaration of Human Rights, framed from an Islamic perspective. The preamble is mostly religious rhetoric, and the particulars of the CDHRI contain numerous references to the Quran, sharia, and aspects of the Islamic faith that appear on no other similar international list. The CDHRI concludes in Articles 24 and 25 that all rights and freedoms mentioned are subject to the Islamic sharia, which is the declaration's sole source. The CDHRI declares true religion to be the "guarantee for enhancing such dignity along the path to human integrity". It also places the responsibility for defending those rights upon the entire Ummah.

== Criticism ==
The CDHRI has been criticized for being implemented by a set of states with widely disparate religious policies and practices who had "a shared interest in disarming international criticism of their domestic human rights record." Article 24 of the declaration states: "All the rights and freedoms stipulated in this Declaration are subject to the Islamic Sharia." Article 19 also says: "There shall be no crime or punishment except as provided for in the Sharia."

The CDHRI has been criticised by the West for failing to allow Muslims to apostasize, as a "fundamental and non-derogable right". In a joint written statement submitted by the International Humanist and Ethical Union (IHEU), a non-governmental organization in special consultative status, the Association for World Education (AWE) and the Association of World Citizens (AWC), a number of concerns were raised that the CDHRI limits human rights, religious freedom, and freedom of expression. The statement concludes that "The Cairo Declaration of Human Rights in Islam is clearly an attempt to limit the rights enshrined in the UDHR and the International Covenants. It can in no sense be seen as complementary to the Universal Declaration."

In September 2008, in an article to the United Nations, the Center for Inquiry writes that the CDHRI "undermines equality of persons and freedom of expression and religion by imposing restrictions on nearly every human right based on Islamic Sharia law." Their complaint and criticism was mostly rooted in and centered around their opposition to integration of "defamation of religions" into international and human rights law. Rhona Smith writes that, because of the CDHRI's reference to Shariah, it implies an inherent degree of superiority of men.

== 2020 CDHRI ==
The CDHRI was revised in 2020 and adopted on 28 November 2020 by the Council of Foreign Ministers at the 47th session in Niamey, Niger. The 1990 version affirms Islamic sharia as its sole source, whereas the 2020 version does not specifically invoke sharia.

== See also ==
- Arab Charter on Human Rights
- Human Rights in Islam
- Human rights in Africa
- Human rights in Asia
- Islam and democracy
