= Khilafat o Malukiyat =

1966 book by Abul A'la Maududi

Islam's Political Order: The Model, Deviations and Muslim Response
- Editor: Anis Ahmad
- Author: Abul Ala Maududi
- Original title: خِلافت و مُلُوکیّت
- Translator: Tarik Jan
- Language: Urdu
- Subject: Caliphate and monarchy
- Genre: History book
- Publication date: October 1966
- Publication place: Pakistan
- ISBN: 9789694481678
- OCLC: 1023814509

Khilafat o Mulukiyat (transl. Caliphate and Kingship) is a 1966 book by Abul Ala Maududi as a refutation of the book, The Caliphate of Mu'awiyah and Yazid by Pakistani scholar Mahmood Ahmad Abbasi.

== Content ==
This book discusses about the stages of transformation of Khilafat into monarchy. It was translated into English and published under the title, Islam's Political Order: The Model, Deviations and Muslim Response. The English edition was translated by Tarik Jan.

== Reception ==
Some Sunni scholars have written in an attempt to refute Maududi's book. Some prominent works are Khilafat-o-Malookiat, Tareekhi-o-Shar'i Haysiat by Hafiz Salahuddin Yousaf, Shahwahid-e-Taqaddus by Syed Muhammad Miyan Deobandi and Hazrat Muawiyah aur Tareekhi Haqa'iq by Taqi Usmani. Works in favour of Maududi include nearly 700 pages long Tajaliat-e-Sahabah by Amir Usmani, nephew of Shabbir Ahmad Usmani; who originally wrote for almost a year in favour of Abbasi's book. Amir Usmani went so far as to claim that Maududi's book was unprecedented in the entire Islamic literature. Another book in favour, Khilafat-o-Malookiat par Aitrazat ka Tajziya was written by Justice Malik Ghulam Ali.
