= Human Rights in Islam (book) =

1976 treatise by Sayyid Abul Ala Maududi

- Author: Sayyid Abul Ala Maududi
- Publisher: The Islamic Foundation
- Publication date: 1976
- Publication place: United Kingdom
- ISBN: 0-9503954-9-8

Human Rights in Islam is a 1976 book written by Sayyid Abul Ala Maududi, the founder of Jamaat-e-Islami.

In the book, Maududi argues that respect for human rights has always been enshrined in Sharia law (that the roots of these rights are to be found in Islamic doctrine) and criticises Western notions that there is an inherent contradiction between the two.

== See also ==
- Human rights in Islamic countries
- Pact of Umar
- Cairo Declaration on Human Rights in Islam
