= Abu al-A'la Mawdudi =

Pakistani Islamic scholar (1903–1979)

Allama Abu al-A'la Mawdudi
- ابو الاعلیٰ المودودی
- Mawdudi

Emir of Jamaat-e-Islami
- In office 26 August 1941 – October 1972
- Preceded by: Position established
- Succeeded by: Miyan Tufail Muhammad (in Pakistan); Abul Lais Islahi Nadvi (in India); Ghulam Azam (in Bangladesh)
- Title: First Emir and Imam of Jamat-e-Islami; Allamah

Personal life
- Born: 25 September 1903 Aurangabad, Hyderabad Deccan, British India
- Died: 22 September 1979 (aged 75) Buffalo, New York, U.S.
- Website: jamaat.org

Religious life
- Religion: Islam
- Denomination: Sunni
- Founder of: Jamaat-e-Islami
- Jurisprudence: Hanafi

Abu al-A'la Mawdudi (Note: Urdu: ابو الاعلیٰ مودودی) (25 September 1903 – 22 September 1979) was a Pakistani Islamic scholar who served as the emir of Jamaat-e-Islami Pakistan from 1947 to 1972. He previously served as the founding emir of Jamaat-e-Islami in British India from 1941 to 1947, when the organization was split.

Mawdudi was born in Aurangabad, Hyderabad State into a Chishti Sufi clerical family. Regarded as a precocious child, he Arabic, Persian and Islamic law in his teenage from his father and other Islamic scholars. He gained multiple ijazahs (Islamic degree) in a number of Islamic sciences. Mawdudi was interested in politics from an early age and sought to establish a dawah organization, the Jamaat-e-Islami, that would oppose the Indian National Congress and the All-India Muslim League. At the time of the Indian independence movement, Mawdudi and the Jamaat actively worked to oppose the partition of India. However, following the partition, Mawdudi pledged allegiance and moved to Pakistan and shifted his focus to politicising Islam, generating support for making Pakistan an Islamic state. Mawdudi's ideas are thought to have influenced the decision of General Zia-ul-Haq to begin the process of Islamisation in Pakistan. Mawdudi died in the United States in 1979 and was given a state funeral, led by Yusuf al-Qaradawi, at the Kaaba in Mecca.

A highly prolific author, Mawdudi was the author of dozens of works, including Tafhim-ul-Quran, his exegesis of the Quran. He was the world's first recipient of the Saudi King Faisal International Award for his service to Islam in 1979. Mawdudi was also part of establishing and running of Islamic University of Madinah, Saudi Arabia. Mawdudi's writings influenced the Iranian Revolution. He is acclaimed by the Muslim Brotherhood, Hamas, Bangladesh Jamaat-e-Islami, Islamic Circle of North America and other Islamist organisations.

== Early life ==
=== Background ===
Mawdudi was born in the city of Aurangabad in colonial India, then part of the princely state enclave of Hyderabad. He was the youngest of three sons of Ahmad Hasan, a lawyer by profession. His elder brother, Sayyid Abu al-Khayr Mawdudi (1899–1979), would later become an editor and journalist.

Although his father was only middle-class, he was the descendant of the Chishti. His last name was derived from the first member of the Chishti Silsilah, i.e., Khawajah Syed Qutb ul-Din Maudood Chishti (d. 527 AH). He stated that his paternal family originally moved from Chisht, in modern-day Afghanistan, during the days of Sikandar Lodi (d. 1517), initially settling in the state of Haryana before moving to Delhi later on, and on his mother's side, his ancestor Mirza Tulak, a soldier of Turkic origin, moved into India from Transoxiana around the times of Emperor Aurangzeb (d. 1707), while his maternal grandfather, Mirza Qurban Ali Baig Khan Salik (1816–1881), was a writer and poet in Delhi, a friend of the Urdu poet Ghalib.

=== Childhood ===
Until he was nine, Mawdudi "received religious nurture at the hands of his father and from a variety of teachers employed by him." As his father wanted him to become a maulvi, this education consisted of learning Arabic, Persian, Islamic law and Hadith. He also studied books of mantiq (logic). A precocious child, he translated Qasim Amin's al-Marah al-Jadidah ("The New Woman"), a modernist and feminist work, from Arabic into Urdu at the age of 11. In the field of translation, years later, he also worked on some 3,500 pages from Asfar, the major work of the 17th century Persian-Shi'a mystical thinker Mulla Sadra. His thought would influence Mawdudi, as "Sadra's notions of rejuvenation of the temporal order, and the necessity of the reign of Islamic law (Shari'ah) for the spiritual ascension of man, found an echo in Mawdudi's works."

=== Education ===
When he was eleven, Mawdudi was admitted to the eighth class directly in Madrasa Fawqaniyya Mashriqiyya (Oriental High School), Aurangabad, founded by Shibli Nomani, a modernist Islamic scholar trying to synthesise traditional Islamic scholarship with modern knowledge, and which awakened Mawdudi's long-lasting interest in philosophy (particularly from Thomas Arnold, who also taught the same subject to Muhammad Iqbal) as well as natural sciences, like mathematics, physics, and chemistry. He then moved to a more traditionalist Darul Uloom in Hyderabad. Meanwhile, his father shifted to Bhopal – there Mawdudi befriended Niaz Fatehpuri, another modernist – where he suffered a severe paralysis attack and died leaving no property or money, forcing his son to abort his education. In 1919 by the time he was 16, and still a modernist in mindset, he moved to Delhi and read books by his distant relative, the reformist Sayyid Ahmad Khan. He also learned English and German to study, intensively, Western philosophy, sociology, and history for full five years: he eventually came up to the conclusion that "ulama' in the past did not endeavor to discover the causes of Europe's rise, and he offered a long list of philosophers whose scholarship had made Europe a world power: Fichte, Hegel, Comte, Mill, Turgot, Adam Smith, Malthus, Rousseau, Voltaire, Montesquieu, Darwin, Goethe, and Herder, among others. Comparing their contribution to that of Muslims, he concluded that the latter did not reach even 1 percent."

=== Journalism ===
Despite his initial publication on electricity in Maarif in 1918 at the age of 15 and his subsequent appointment as editor of the weekly Urdu newspaper Taj in 1920 at the age of 17, he subsequently resumed his studies as an autodidact in 1921. Notably through the influence of certain members of the Jamiat Ulema-e-Hind, he pursued subjects such as philosophical theology and the Dars-e-Nizami curriculum. Mawdudi obtained ijazahs, which are certificates and diplomas in traditional Islamic learning. However, he abstained from referring to himself as an ''alim in the formal sense, as he perceived the Islamic scholars as regressive, despite some influence from Deobandi on him:

He said that he was a middle-class man who had learned through both new and old ways of learning. Mawdudi concluded that neither the traditional nor the contemporary schools are entirely correct, based on his own inner guidance.

Mawdudi worked as the editor of al-Jamiah, a newspaper of a group of orthodox Muslims, from 1924 to 1927. This time was critical and had a lot of influence.

Mawdudi, who has consistently remained committed to securing independence from Britain, began to question the legitimacy of the Indian National Congress and its Muslim allies during the 1920s, when the party adopted a more Hindu identity. He began to gravitate towards Islam, and he believed that democracy would only be viable if the vast majority of Indians were Muslims.

Mawdudi returned to Hyderabad in 1928 after spending some time in Delhi as a young man.

=== Political writings ===
Mawdudi's works were written and published throughout his life, including influential works from 1933 to 1941. Mawdudi's most well-known work, and widely considered his most important and influential work, is the Tafhim-ul-Quran (Urdu: تفہيم القرآن, Romanised: Towards Understanding the Qur'an), a 6-volume translation and commentary of the Qur'an which Mawdudi spent many years writing (which was begun in Muharram, 1361 A.H./February 1942).

In 1932, he joined another journal (Tarjuman al-Quran) and from 1932 to 1937 he began to develop his political ideas, and turn towards the cause of Islamic revivalism and Islam as an ideology, over what he called "traditional and hereditary religion". The government of Hyderabad helped support the journal by buying 300 subscriptions which it donated to libraries around India. Mawdudi was alarmed by the decline of Muslim ruled Hyderabad, the increasing secularism and lack of purdah among Muslim women in Delhi.

By 1937, he became in conflict with Jamiat Ulema-e-Hind and its support for a pluralistic Indian society where the Jamiat hoped Muslims could "thrive ... without sacrificing their identity or interests". In that year he also married Mahmudah Begum, a woman from an old Muslim family with "considerable financial resources". The family provide financial help and allowed him to devote himself to research and political action, but his wife had "liberated", modern ways, and at first rode a bicycle and did not observe purdah. She was given greater latitude by Mawdudi than were other Muslims.

== Political activity ==
At this time he also began work on establishing an organisation for Da'wah (propagation and preaching of Islam) that would be an alternative to both the Indian National Congress and the Muslim League.

At this time he decided to leave Hyderabad for Northwest India, closer to the Muslim political center of gravity in India. In 1938, after meeting the famous Muslim poet Muhammad Iqbal, Mawdudi moved to a piece of land in the village of Pathankot in the Punjab to oversee a Waqf (Islamic foundation) called Daru'l-Islam.

His hope was to make it a "nerve center" of Islamic revival in India, an ideal religious community, providing leaders and the foundation for a genuine religious movement. He wrote to various Muslim luminaries invited them to join him there. The community, like Jamaat-e-Islami later, was composed of rukn (members), a shura (a consultative council), and a sadr (head). After a dispute with the person who donated the land for the community over Mawdudi's anti-nationalist politics, Mawdudi quit the waqf and in 1939 moved the Daru'l-Islam with its membership from Pathankot to Lahore.

In Lahore he was hired by Islamiyah College but was sacked after less than a year for his openly political lectures.

=== Founding the Jamaat-i-Islami ===
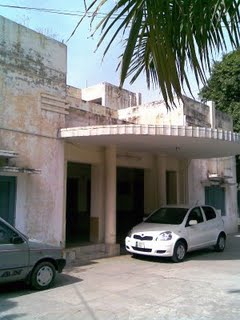
Main entrance of the House of Syed Abul A'la Mawdudi 4-A, Zaildar Park, Ichhra, Lahore.

In August 1941, Mawdudi founded Jamaat-e-Islami (JI) in British India as a religious political movement to promote Islamic values and practices. His Mission was supported by Amin Ahsan Islahi, Muhammad Manzoor Naumani, Abul Hassan Ali Nadvi and Naeem Siddiqui.

Jamaat-e-Islami actively opposed the partition of India, with its leader Abul A'la Mawdudi arguing that the concept violated the Islamic doctrine of the ummah. The Jamaat-e-Islami saw the partition as creating a temporal border that would divide Muslims from one another.

Mawdudi held that humans should accept God's sovereignty and adopt the divine code, which supersedes manmade laws, terming it a "theodemocracy", because its rule would be based on the entire Muslim community, not the ulama (Islamic scholars).

Mawdudi migrated to Lahore, which became part of the new state of Pakistan.

=== After the creation of Pakistan ===
With the partition of India in 1947, the JI was split to follow the political boundaries of new countries carved out of British India. The organisation headed by Mawdudi became known as Jamaat-e-Islami Pakistan, and the remnant of JI in India as the Jamaat-e-Islami Hind. Later JI parties were the Bangladesh Jamaat-e-Islami, and autonomous groups in Indian Kashmir.

With the founding of Pakistan, Mawdudi's career underwent a "fundamental change", being drawn more and more into politics, and spending less time on ideological and scholarly pursuits. Although his Jamaat-e-Islami party never developed a mass following, it and Mawdudi did develop significant political influence. It played a "prominent part" in the agitation which brought down President Muhammad Ayub Khan in 1969 and in the overthrow of Prime Minister Zulfikar Ali Bhutto in 1977. Ideas of Mawdudi and the JI were especially influential in the early years of Muhammad Zia ul-Haq's rule.

His political activity, particularly in support of the creation of an Islamic state clashed with the government, (dominated for many years by a secular political class), and resulted in several arrests and periods of incarceration. The first was in 1948 when he and several other JI leaders were jailed after Mawdudi objected to the government's clandestine sponsorship of insurgency in Jammu and Kashmir while professing to observe a ceasefire with India.

In 1951 and again in 1956–1957, the compromises involved in electoral politics led to a split in the party over what some members felt were a lowering of JI's moral standards. In 1951, the JI shura passed a resolution in support of the party withdrawing from politics, while Mawdudi argued for continued involvement. Mawdudi prevailed at an open party meeting in 1951, and several senior JI leaders resigned in protest, further strengthened Mawdudi's position and beginning the growth of a "cult of personality" around him. In 1957 Mawdudi again overruled the vote of the shura to withdraw from electoral politics.

In 1953, he and the JI participated in a campaign against the Ahmadiyya Community in Pakistan. Anti-Ahmadi groups argued that the Ahmadiyya did not embrace Muhammad as the last prophet. Mawdudi as well as the traditionalist ulama of Pakistan wanted Ahmadi designated as non-Muslims, Ahmadis such as Muhammad Zafarullah Khan sacked from all high level government positions, and intermarriage between Ahmadis and other Muslims prohibited. The campaign generated riots in Lahore, leading to the deaths of at least somewhere between 200 and 2000 people, and selective declaration of martial law.

Mawdudi was arrested by the military deployment headed by Lieutenant General Azam Khan and sentenced to death for his part in the agitation. However, the anti-Ahmadi campaign enjoyed much popular support, and strong public pressure ultimately convinced the government to release him after two years of imprisonment. According to Vali Nasr, Mawdudi's unapologetic and impassive stance after being sentenced, ignoring advice to ask for clemency, had an "immense" effect on his supporters. It was seen as a "victory of Islam over un-Islam", proof of his leadership and staunch faith.

In particular, Mawdudi advocated that the Pakistani state should be in accordance to Quran and Sunnah, including in terms of conventional banking and rights to Muslims, minorities, Christians, and other religious sects such as the Ahmadiyya.

An Islamic state is a Muslim state, but a Muslim state may not be an Islamic state unless and until the Constitution of the state is based on the Qur'an and Sunnah.

The campaign shifted the focus of national politics towards Islamicity. The 1956 Constitution was adopted after accommodating many of the demands of the JI. Mawdudi endorsed the constitution and claimed it a victory for Islam.

However following a coup by General Ayub Khan, the constitution was shelved and Mawdudi and his party were politically repressed, Mawdudi being imprisoned in 1964 and again in 1967. The JI joined an opposition alliance with secular parties, compromising with doctrine to support a woman candidate (Fatima Jinnah) for president against Khan in 1965. In the December 1970 general election, Mawdudi toured the country as a "leader in waiting" and JI spent considerable energy and resources fielding 151 candidates. Despite this, the party won only four seats in the national assembly and four in the provincial assemblies.

The loss led Mawdudi to withdraw from political activism in 1971 and return to scholarship. In 1972 he resigned as JI's Ameer (leader) for reasons of health. However it was shortly thereafter that Islamism gathered steam in Pakistan in the form of the Nizam-i-Mustafa (Order of the Prophet) movement, an alliance of conservative political groups united against Zulfikar Ali Bhutto which the JI gave shape to and which bolstered its standing.

In 1977, Mawdudi "returned to the center stage". When Bhutto attempted to defuse tensions on 16 April 1977, he came to Mawdudi's house for consultations. When General Muhammad Zia-ul-Haq overthrew Bhutto and came to power in 1977, he "accorded Mawdudi the status of a senior statesman, sought his advice, and allowed his words to adorn the front pages of the newspapers. Mawdudi proved receptive to Zia's overtures and supported his decision to execute Bhutto." Despite some doctrinal difference (Mawdudi wanted sharia by education rather than by state fiat), Mawdudi enthusiastically supported Zia and his program of Islamisation or "Sharisation".

Mawdudi's ideas and political movement they engendered were lent significantly greater influence and visibility throughout Zia-ul-Haq's administration, and tens of thousands of the movement's members and sympathisers were given jobs in the judiciary and civil service during this period.

== Beliefs and ideology ==
Mawdudi poured his energy into books, pamphlets and more than 1000 speeches and press statements, laying the ground work for making Pakistan an Islamic state, but also dealing with a variety of issues of interest in Pakistan and the Muslim world. He sought to be a Mujaddid, "renewing" (tajdid) the religion. This role had great responsibility as he believed a Mujaddid "on the whole, has to undertake and perform the same kind of work as is accomplished by a Prophet." While earlier mujaddids had renewed religion he wanted also "to propagate true Islam, the absence of which accounted for the failure of earlier efforts at tajdid." He was very much disheartened after the Ottoman collapse, he believed the limited vision of Muslims to Islam rather than a complete ideology of living, was its main cause. He argued that to revive the lost Islamic pride, Muslims must accept Islam as complete way of living.

Mawdudi was highly influenced by the ideas of the medieval theologian Ibn Taymiyya, particularly his treatises that emphasised the Sovereignty (Hakimiyya) of God. Mawdudi would stress that armed Jihad was imperative for all contemporary Muslims and like Sayyid Qutb, called for a "universal Jihad". According to at least one biographer (Vali Nasr), Mawdudi and the JI moved away from some of their more controversial doctrinal ideas (e.g. criticism of Sufism or the Ulama) and closer to orthodox Islam over the course of his career, in order to "expand" the "base of support" of Jama'at-e Islami.

=== Qur'an ===
Mawdudi believed that the Quran was not just religious literature to be "recited, pondered, or investigated for hidden truths" according to Vali Nasr, but a "socio-religious institution", a work to be accepted "at face value" and obeyed. By implementing its prescriptions the ills of societies would be solved. It pitted truth and bravery against ignorance, falsehood and evil.

The Qur'an is ... a Book which contains a message, an invitation, which generates a movement. The moment it began to be sent down, it impelled a quiet and pious man to ... raise his voice against falsehood, and pitted him in a grim struggle against the lords of disbelief, evil and iniquity.... it drew every pure and noble soul, and gathered them under the banner of truth. In every part of the country, it made all the mischievous and the corrupt to rise and wage war against the bearers of the truth.

In his tafsir (Quranic interpretation) Tafhimu'l-Qur'an, he introduced the four interrelated concepts he believed essential to understanding the Quran: ilah (divinity), rabb (lord), ibadah (worship, meaning not the cherishing or praising of God but acting out absolute obedience to Him), and din (religion).

=== Islam ===
Mawdudi saw Muslims not simply as those who followed the religion of Islam, but as (almost) everything, because obedience to divine law is what defines a Muslim: "Everything in the universe is 'Muslim' for it obeys Allah by submission to His laws." The laws of the physical universe—that Heaven is above the Earth, that night follows day, etc.—were as much a part of sharia as banning consumption of alcohol and interest on debts. Thus it followed that stars, planets, oceans, rocks, atoms, etc. should actually be considered "Muslims" since they obey their creator's laws.

Rather than Muslims being a minority among humans—one religious group among many—it is non-Muslims who are a small minority among everything in the universe. Of all creatures only humans (and jinn) are endowed with free will, and only non-Muslim humans (and jinn) choose to use that will to disobey the laws of their creator.

Mawdudi believed that those elements of divine law of Islam applying to human beings covered all aspects of life.

Islam is not a 'religion' in the sense this term is commonly understood. It is a system encompassing all fields of living. Islam means politics, economics, legislation, science, humanism, health, psychology and sociology. It is a system which makes no discrimination on the basis of race, color, language or other external categories. Its appeal is to all mankind. It wants to reach the heart of every human being.

Mawdudi adopted Hanbali theologian Ibn Taymiyya's doctrines on apostasy, which asserted that an individual may only be considered a Muslim if his or her beliefs found an adequate representation in their acts. Describing the essential conditions of Islam and stressing the difference between a Muslims and non-Muslims; Mawdudi states:

'Islam is first of all the name of knowledge [ʿilm] and, after knowledge, the name of action [ʿamal]', that 'after you have acquired knowledge it is a necessity to also act upon it', and that 'a Muslim is distinct from an unbeliever [kāfir] only by two things: one is knowledge, the other action [upon it]'.

But in rejecting Islam (Mawdudi believed) the non-Muslim struggled against truth:

His very tongue which, on account of his ignorance advocates the denial of God or professes multiple deities, is in its very nature 'Muslim'. ... The man who denies God is called Kafir (concealer) because he conceals by his disbelief what is inherent in his nature and embalmed in his own soul. His whole body functions in obedience to that instinct. ... Reality becomes estranged from him and he in the dark.

Since a Muslim is the one who obeys divine law, simply having made a shahada (declaration of belief in the oneness of God and the acceptance of Muhammad as God's prophet) or being born into a Muslim family does not make you a Muslim. Nor is seeking "knowledge of God" part of the religion of Islam. The Muslim is a "slave of God", and "absolute obedience to God" is a "fundamental right" of God. The Muslim does "not have the right to choose a way of life for himself or assume whatever duties he likes."

Though he set a high bar for who would qualify as a Muslim, Mawdudi was adamant that the punishment for a Muslim leaving the faith was death. He wrote that among early Muslims, among the schools of fiqh both Sunni and Shia, among scholars of shari'ah "of every century ... available on record", there is unanimous agreement that the punishment for apostate is death, and that "no room whatever remains to suggest" that this penalty has not "been continuously and uninterruptedly operative" through Islamic history; evidence from early texts that Muhammad called for apostates to be killed, and that companions of the Prophet and early caliphs ordered beheadings and crucifixions of apostates and has never been declared invalid over the course of the history of Islamic theology (Christine Schirrmacher).

Of all aspects of Islam, Mawdudi was primarily interested in culture—preserving Islamic dress, language and customs, from (what he believed were) the dangers of women's emancipation, secularism, nationalism, etc. It was also important to separate the realm of Islam from non-Islam—to form "boundaries" around Islam. It would also be proven scientifically (Mawdudi believed) that Islam would "eventually ... emerge as the World-Religion to cure Man of all his maladies."

But what many Muslims, including many Ulama, considered Islam, Mawdudi did not. Maudid complained that "not more than 0.001%" of Muslim knew what Islam actually was. Mawdudi not only idealised the first years of Muslim society (Muhammad and the "rightly guided" Caliphs), but considered what came after to be un-Islamic or jahiliya—with the exception of brief religious revivals. Muslim philosophy, literature, arts, mysticism were syncretic and impure, diverting attention from the divine.

==== Hadith ====
Mawdudi had a unique perspective on the transmission of hadith—the doings and sayings of the Islamic prophet Muhammad that were passed on orally before being written down, and which form most of the basis of Islamic law. The authenticity and "quality" of hadith are traditionally left to the judgments of "generations of muhaddithin" (hadith scholars) who base their decisions on factors like the number of chains of oral transmission (known as isnad) passing down the text of the hadith (matn) and reliability of the transmitters/narrators passing down the hadith in the chain. But Mawdudi believed that "with extensive study and practice one can develop a power and can intuitively sense the wishes and desires of the Holy Prophet", and that he had that intuitive ability. "Thus ... on seeing a Hadith, I can tell whether the Holy Prophet could or could not have said it." Mawdudi also disagreed with many traditional/conservative Muslims in arguing that evaluating hadith, traditional hadith scholars had ignored the importance of the matn (content) in favor of the isnad (chain of transmission of the hadith). Mawdudi also broke with traditional doctrine by raising the question of the reliability of companions of the prophet as transmitters of hadith, saying "even the noble Companions were overcome by human weaknesses, one attacking another."

==== Sunnah ====
Mawdudi wrote a number of essays on the sunnah—the customs and practices of Muhammad—and sought a middle way between the belief of conservative Islamists that the sunnah of the prophet should be obeyed in every aspect, and the traditions that tells us that Muhammad made mistakes, and was not always obeyed by his followers (Zayd divorced his wife against the wishes of Muhammad). Mawdudi argued that mistakes by Muhammad corrected by God mentioned in the Quran should be thought of not as an indication of Muhammad's human frailty but of how God monitored his behavior and corrected even his smallest errors. Mawdudi concluded that in theory (naẓarī) the Prophet's prophetic and personal capacities are separate and distinct, but in practice (ʿamalī) it is "neither practical nor permissible" for mortals to decide for themselves which is which, and so Muslims should not disregard any aspect of the sunnah.

=== Women ===
According to Irfan Ahmad, while Mawdudi opposed all Western influence in Islam, "the greatest threat to morality" to him was "women's visibility" in the bazaar, colleges, theatres, restaurants. "Art, literature, music, film, dance, use of makeup by women: all were shrieking signs of immorality."

Mawdudi preached that the duty of women is to manage the household, bring up children and provide them and her husband with "the greatest possible comfort and contentment". Mawdudi supported the complete veiling and segregation of women as practiced in most of Muslim India of his time. Women, he believed, should remain in their homes except when absolutely necessary. The only room for argument he saw in the matter of veiling/hijab was "whether the hands and the face" of women "were to be covered or left uncovered." On this question Mawdudi came down on the side of the complete covering of women's faces whenever they left their homes.

Concerning the separation of the genders, he preached that men should avoid looking at women other than their wives, mothers, sisters, etc. (mahram), much less trying to make their acquaintance. He opposed birth control and family planning as a "rebellion against the laws of nature", and a reflection of loss of faith in God—who is the planner of human population—and unnecessary because population growth leads to economic development. Mohammad Najatuallah Siddiqui writes:

As to the argument that family planning enables better nourishment and education of children, Mawdudi refers to the beneficial effects of adversity and want on human character.

Mawdudi opposed allowing women to be either a head of state or a legislator, since "according to Islam, active politics and administration are not the field of activity of the womenfolk." They would be allowed to elect their own all-woman legislature which the men's legislature should consult on all matters concerning women's welfare. Their legislature would also have "the full right to criticise matters relating to the general welfare of the country," though not to vote on them.

=== Music ===
Mawdudi saw music and dancing as social evils. In describing the wickedness that comes of ignoring Islamic law he included not only leaving the poor to "starvation and destitution" while wallowing in luxury, liquor and drugs, but having "a regular need" for music, satisfied with "musicians, dancing girls, drum-beaters and manufacturers of musical instruments".

=== Economics ===
His 1941 lecture "The Economic Problem of Man and Its Islamic Solution" is generally considered to be one of the founding document of modern Islamic economics. Mawdudi has been called the leader of the "vanguard of contemporary Islamic orthodoxy" in "riba and finance" and credited with laying "down the foundations for development" of Islamic economics.

However, Mawdudi believed Islam "does not concern itself with the modes of production and circulation of wealth", and was primarily interested in cultural issues rather than socioeconomic ones. Mawdudi dismissed the need for a "new science of economics, embodied in voluminous books, with high-sounding terminology and large organisation", or other "experts and specialists" which he believed to be "one of the many calamities of modern age". But since Islam was a complete system, it included (a shariah-based) economic program, comparable and superior to other economic systems. Capitalism was a "satanic economic system" starting with the fact that it called for the postponement of some consumption in favor of investment.

One of the major fallacies of economics was that it regarded "as foolish and morally reprehensible" spending "all that one earns, and everyone is told that he should save something out of his income and have his savings deposited in the bank or purchase an insurance policy or invest it in stocks and shares of joint-stock companies." In fact, the practice of saving and not spending some income is "ruinous for humanity". This led to overproduction and a downward spiral of lower wages, protectionism, trade wars and desperate attempts to export surplus production and capital through imperialist invasions of other countries, finally ending in "the destruction of the whole society as every learned economist knows".

On the other hand, socialism — by putting control of the means and distribution of production in the hands of the government – concentrates power to such an extent it inevitably leads to enslavement of the masses. Socialists sought to end economic exploitation and poverty by structural changes and putting an end to private ownership of production and property. But in fact poverty and exploitation is caused not by the profit motive but by the lack of "virtue and public welfare" among the wealthy, which in turn comes from a lack of adherence to sharia law. In an Islamic society, greed, selfishness and dishonesty would be replaced by virtue, eliminating the need for the state to make any significant intervention in the economy.

According to Mawdudi, this system would strike a "golden mean" between the two extremes of laissez-faire capitalism and a regimented socialist/communist society, embodying all of the virtues and none of the vices of the two inferior systems. It would not be some kind of mixed economy/social democratic compromise (as some alleged), because by following Islamic law and banning alcohol, pork, adultery, music, dancing, interest on loans, gambling, speculation, fraud, and "other similar things", it would be distinct and superior to all other systems.

Before the economy (like the government, and other parts of society) could be Islamised, an Islamic revolution-through-education would have to take place to develop this virtue and create support for total sharia law. This put Mawdudi at a political disadvantage with populist and socialist programs because his solution was "neither immediate nor tangible".

==== Banning interest ====
Of all the elements of Islamic laws dealing with property and money (payment of zakat and other Islamic taxes, etc.), Mawdudi emphasised the elimination of interest on loans (riba). (According to one scholar, this was because in British India Hindus dominated the money lending trade.)

Mawdudi opposed any and all interest on loans as unIslamic riba. He taught that there

is hardly a country of the world in which moneylenders and banks are not sucking the blood of poor labouring classes, farmers and low income groups ... A major portion of the earning of a working man is expropriated by the moneylenders, leaving the poor man with hardly enough money to feed himself and his family.

While the Quran forbid many sins, it saved its "severest terms" of punishment – according to Mawdudi – for use of interest. (Note: " ... The Holy Quran forbids many other sins also and warnings of condign [sic] punishment for them have also been given, but in no other case have such severest terms been used as in the prohibition of usury")

He believed there was no such thing as a low "reasonable rate of interest" and that even "the smallest and apparently harmless form" of interest was intolerable in Islam as rates would inevitably increase over time when the "capitalists" (moneylenders) squeezed the entrepreneurs (borrowers) eliminating any entrepreneurial profit. To replace interest-based finance he proposed "direct equity investment" (aka Profit and loss sharing), which he asserted would favor "societally profitable" ventures such as low-income housing that conventional finance ignores in favour of commercially profitable ones. To eliminate the charging of interest he proposed penal punishment with the death penalty for repeat offenders.

Feisal Khan says Mawdudi's description of interest-based finance resembles that of the dynamic between South Asian peasant and village moneylender rather than between modern bank lender and borrower; nor did Mawdudi give any explanation why direct equity finance would lead to any more investment in what is good for society but not commercially profitable for financiers than interest-based lending has.

==== Socialism and populism ====
Unlike Islamists such as Ayatollah Ruhollah Khomeini, Mawdudi had a visceral antipathy to socialism, which he spent much time denouncing as "godless" as well as being unnecessary and redundant in the face of the Islamic state. A staunch defender of the rights of property, he warned workers and peasants that "you must never take the exaggerated view of your rights which the protagonists of class war present before you." He also did not believe in intervention in the economy to provide universal employment.

Islam does not make it binding on society to provide employment for each and every one of its citizens, since this responsibility cannot be accepted without thorough nationalisation of the country's resources.

Mawdudi held to this position despite his florid denunciations of how the rich were "sucking the blood" and enslaving the poor, the popularity of populism among many Pakistanis, and the poverty and vast gap between rich and poor in Pakistan (a situation often described a "feudal" (jagirdari) in its large landholdings and rural poverty).

He openly opposed land reform proposals for Punjab by Prime Minister Liaquat Ali Khan in the 1950s, going so far as to justify feudalism by pointing to Islam's protection of property rights. He later softened his views, extolling economic justice and equity (but not egalitarianism), but cautioned the government against tampering with "lawful Jagirdari", and continuing to emphasise the sanctity of private property.

=== Islamic Modernism ===
Mawdudi believed that Islam supported modernisation but not Westernisation. He agreed with Islamic Modernists that Islam contained nothing contrary to reason, and that it was superior in rational terms to all other religious systems. He disagreed with their practice of examining the Quran and the Sunnah using reason as the standard, instead of starting from the proposition that "true reason is Islamic" and accepting the Book and the Sunnah, rather than reason, as the final authority.

He also took a narrow view of ijtihad, limiting the authority to use it to those with thorough grounding in Islamic sciences, faith in the sharia, and then only to serve the needs of his vision of an Islamic state.

At the same time, one scholar, Maryam Jameelah, has noted the extensive use of modern, non-traditionally Islamic ideas and "Western idioms and concepts" in Mawdudi's thought.

Islam was a "revolutionary ideology" and a "dynamic movement", the Jama'at-e-Islami, was a "party", the Shari'ah a complete "code" in Islam's "total scheme of life." His enthusiasm for [Western idioms and concepts] was infectious among those who admired him, encouraging them to implement in Pakistan all his "manifestos", "programmes" and "schemes'", to usher in a true Islamic "renaissance".

=== Mughal Empire ===
Abul A'la Mawdudi, condemned Mughal Emperor Akbar's belief in an individual's common spirituality (controversially known as the Din-e Ilahi, or "Religion of God") as a form of apostasy. (Contemporary scholars such as S. M. Ikram argue that Akbar's true intentions were to create an iradat or muridi (discipleship) and not a new religion.)

Mawdudi appears to be a critic of not only Western Civilisation but also of the Mughal Empire, many of whose achievements he deemed "Unislamic".

=== Secularism ===
Mawdudi did not see secularism as a way for the state/government to dampen tensions and divisions in multi-religious societies by remaining religiously neutral and avoid choosing sides. Rather, he believed, it removed religion from society (he translated secularism into Urdu as la din, literally "religionless"). Since (he believed) all morality came from religion, this would necessarily mean "the exclusion of all morality, ethics, or human decency from the controlling mechanisms of society." It was to avoid the "restraints of morality and divine guidance", and not out of pragmatism or some higher motive, that some espoused secularism.

=== Science ===
Mawdudi believed "modern science was a 'body' that could accommodate any 'spirit'—philosophy or value system—just as radio could broadcast Islamic or Western messages with equal facility."

=== Nationalism ===
Mawdudi strongly opposed the concept of nationalism, believing it to be shirk (polytheism), and "a Western concept which divided the Muslim world and thus prolonged the supremacy of Western imperialist powers". After Pakistan was formed, Mawdudi and the JI forbade Pakistanis to take an oath of allegiance to the state until it became Islamic, arguing that a Muslim could in clear conscience render allegiance only to God.

=== Ulama ===
Mawdudi also criticised traditionalist clergy or ulama for their "moribund" scholastic style, "servile" political attitudes, and "ignorance" of the modern world". He believed traditional scholars were unable to distinguish the fundamentals of Islam from the details of its application, built up in elaborate structures of medieval legal schools of fiqh (Islamic jurisprudence). To rid Islam of these obscure laws Muslims should return to the Quran and Sunna, ignoring judgments made after the reign of the first four "rightfully guided" caliphs (al-Khulafāʾu ar-Rāshidūn) of Islam.

Mawdudi also believed there would be little need for the traditional roll of ulama as "leaders, judges, and guardians of the community", in a "reformed and rationalised Islamic order" where those trained in modern as well as traditional subjects would practice ijtihad and where Muslims were educated properly in Arabic, the Quran, Hadith, etc.

However, over time Mawdudi became more orthodox in his attitudes, including toward the ulama, and at times allied himself and his party with them after the formation of Pakistan.

=== Sufism and popular Islam ===
Like other contemporary revivalists, Mawdudi was critical of Sufism and its historical influence in the early part of his life. However, as he got older, his views on Sufism changed and focused his criticism mainly on unorthodox and popular practices of Sufism that was not based on the Sharia In his youth, Mawdudi studied various sciences of Tasawwuf under the Deobandi seminary in Fatihpuri Mosque; from where he obtained an Ijazat (certificate) on the subject "gradations of mystical ecstasy" in 1926. Influenced by the Deobandi reformist doctrines and writings of past scholars like Ibn Taymiyya and Muhammad ibn 'Abd al-Wahhab; Mawdudi opposed folkish forms of excessive Sufism. Mawdudi's conception of Tasawwuf was based on strict adherence to Qur'an and Sunnah like those of the earlier Sufis. He was heavily critical of the cult of saints that developed during the medieval period of Islam, and believed that abiding by the sharia (Islamic law) was essential to achieve Zuhd and Ihsan. Most significantly, Mawdudi asserts that the very highest stage of Ihsan was to be reached through collective societal efforts that establishes a just Islamic state as what occurred during the early period of Islam in the Rashidun Calpihate.

Mawdudi would later clarify that he did not have any antagonism towards Sufism as a whole; by himself or the Jama'at. (According to at least one biographer, this change in position was a result of the importance of Sufism in Pakistan not only among the Muslim masses but the ulama as well.) Mawdudi distinguished between the Orthodox Sufism of Shaikhs like 'Alau'ddin Shah which were bounded in the Sharia (which he approved of), and the shrines, festivals, and rituals of unorthodox popular Sufism (which he did not). While praising Tasawwuf that strictly abides by the Qur'an and Sunnah, Mawdudi condemned later manifestations of Sufism, writing in Risala-i Diniyya (Treatise on Religion):

"They polluted the pure spring of Islamic Tasawwuf with absurdities that could not be justified by any stretch of imagination on the basis of the Qur'an and the Hadith. Gradually a section of Muslims appeared who thought and proclaimed themselves immune to and above the requirements of the Shari'ah. These people are totally ignorant of Islam, for Islam cannot admit of Tasawwuf that loosens itself out of the Shariah and takes liberties with it. No Sufi has the right to transgress the limits of the Shariah or treat lightly the primary obligations such as daily prayers, fasting, zakat and the Hajj"

He "redefined" Sufism, describing it not in the modern sense as the form and spirit of an "esoteric dimension" of Islam, but as the way to measure "concentration" and "morals" in religion, saying: "For example, when we say our prayers, Fiqh will judge us only by fulfillment of the outward requirements such as ablution, facing toward the Ka'ba ... while Tasawwuf (Sufism) will judge our prayers by our concentration ... the effect of our prayers on our morals and manners."

"Sufism is a reality whose signs are the love of Allah and the love of the Prophet (s), where one absents oneself for their sake, and one is annihilated from anything other than them, and it is to know how to follow the footsteps of the Prophet (s). Tasawwuf searched for the sincerity in the heart and the purity in the intention and the trustworthiness in obedience in an individual's actions. The Divine Law and Sufism: Sufism and Shariah: what is the similitude of the two? They are like the body and the soul. The body is the external knowledge, the Divine Law, and the spirit is the internal knowledge."

From the mid-1960s onward, "redefinition" of Islam "increasingly gave way to outright recognition of Tasawwuf", and after Mawdudi's death the JI amir Qazi Hussain Ahmad went so far as to visit the Sufi Data Durbar in Lahore in 1987 as part of a tour to generate mass support for JI. However, as of 2000s, Jamaat-e Islami has grown more critical of certain Sufi trends.

=== Sharia ===
Mawdudi believed that sharia was not just a crucial command that helped define what it meant to be a Muslim, but something without which a Muslim society could not be Islamic:

That if an Islamic society consciously resolves not to accept the sharia, and decides to enact its own constitution and laws or borrow them from any other source in disregard of the sharia, such a society breaks its contract with God and forfeits its right to be called 'Islamic.'

Many unbelievers agreed that God was the creator, what made them unbelievers was their failure to submit to his will, i.e. to God's law. Obedience to God's law or will was "the historical controversy that Islam has awakened" throughout the world. It brought not only heavenly reward, but earthly blessing. Failure to obey, or "rebellion" against it, brought not only eternal punishment, but evil and misery here on earth.

The source of sharia, was to be found not only in the Quran but also in the Sunnah (the doings and sayings of the Islamic prophet Muhammad), since the Quran proclaimed "Whoever obeys the messenger [i.e. Muhammad] obeys Allah."^{[Quran 4:80]} Sharia was perhaps most famous for calling for the abolition of interest-bearing banks, hadd penalties such as flogging and amputation for alcohol consumption, theft, fornication, adultery and other crimes. Hadd penalties have been criticised by Westernised Muslims as cruel and in violation of international human rights but Mawdudi argued that any cruelty was far outweighed by the cruelty in the West that resulted from the absence of these punishments, and in any case would not be applied until Muslims fully understood the teachings of their faith and lived in an Islamic state.

But in fact sharia was much more than these laws. It recognises no division between religion and other aspects of life, in Mawdudi's view, and there was no area of human activity or concern which the sharia did not address with specific divine guidance.

Family relationships, social and economic affairs, administration, rights and duties of citizens, judicial system, laws of war and peace and international relations. In short it embraces all the various departments of life ... The sharia is a complete scheme of life and an all-embracing social order where nothing is superfluous and nothing lacking.

A "very large part" of sharia required "the coercive power and authority of the state" for its enforcement. Consequently, while a state based on Islam has a legislature which the ruler must consult, its function "is really that of law-finding, not of law-making."

At the same time, Mawdudi states ("somewhat astonishingly" according to one scholar) "there is yet another vast range of human affairs about which sharia is totally silent" and which an Islamic state may write "independent" legislation.

According to scholar (Vali Nasr), Mawdudi believed that the sharia needed to be "streamlined, reinterpreted, and expanded" to "address questions of governance to the extent required for a state to function." For example, sharia needed to "make clear the relation between the various branches of government".

=== Islamic Revolution ===
Though the phrase "Islamic Revolution" is commonly associated with the 1979 Iranian Revolution, (or General Zia's Islamisation), Mawdudi coined and popularised it in the 1940s. The process Mawdudi envisioned—changing the hearts and minds of individuals from the top of society downward through an educational process or da'wah—was very different than what happened in Iran, or under Zia ul-Haq. Mawdudi talked of Islam being "a revolutionary ideology and a revolutionary practice which aims at destroying the social order of the world totally and rebuilding it from scratch", but opposed sudden change, violent or unconstitutional action, and was uninterested in grassroots organising, socio-economic changes, or even street demonstrations, often associated with revolutions.

His "revolution" would be achieved "step-by-step" with "patience", since "the more sudden a change, the more short-lived it is." He warned against the emotionalism of "demonstrations or agitations, ... flag waving, slogans ... impassioned speeches ... or the like". He believed that "societies are built, structured, and controlled from the top down by conscious manipulation of those in power," not by grassroots movements. The revolution would be carried out by training a cadre of pious and dedicated men who would lead and then protect the Islamic revolutionary process. To facilitate this far-reaching program of cultural change, his party "invested heavily" in producing and disseminating publications.

Mawdudi was committed to non-violent legal politics "even if the current methods of struggle takes a century to bear fruit." In 1957 he outlined a new Jama'at policy declaring that "transformation of the political order through unconstitutional means" was against sharia law. Even when he and his party were repressed by the Ayub Khan or People's Party (in 1972) governments, Mawdudi kept his party from clandestine activity. It was not until he retired as emir of JI that JI and Jam'iat-e Tulabah "became more routinely involved in violence."

The objective of the revolution was to be justice (adl) and benevolence (ihsan), but the injustice and wrong to be overcome that he focused on was immorality (fahsha) and forbidden behavior (munkarat). Mawdudi was interested in ethical changes, rather than socio-economic changes of the sort that drive most historical revolutions and revolutionary movements. He did not support these (for example, opposing land reform in the 1950s as an encroachment on property rights) and believed the problems they addressed would be solved by the Islamic state established by the revolution.

=== Islamic state ===
The modern conceptualisation of the "Islamic state" is also attributed to Mawdudi. This term was coined and popularised in his book, The Islamic Law and Constitution (1941), and in subsequent writings.

After the creation of Pakistan, Mawdudi's "concentrated" his efforts on converting it to an Islamic state, where he envisioned Sharia would be enforced—banks that charged and gave interest would be abolished, the sexes would be segregated, hijab compulsory, and the hadd penalties (public lashing, amputation of hands and/or feet, stoning to death, etc.) for theft, alcohol consumption, adultery and other crimes.

Mawdudi's Islamic state is both ideological and all-embracing, based on "Islamic Democracy," and will eventually "rule the earth". In 1955 he described it as a "God-worshipping democratic Caliphate, founded on the guidance vouchsafed to us through Muhammad." Ultimately though, Islam was more important and the state would be judged by its adherence to din (religion and the Islamic system) and not democracy.

Unlike the Islamic state of Ayatollah Khomeini, it would not establish and enforce Islamisation, but follow the Islamisation of society. As Mawdudi became involved in politics, this vision was "relegated to a distant utopia".

Three principles underlying it: tawhid (oneness of God), risala (prophethood) and khilafa (caliphate). The "sphere of activity" covered by the Islamic state would be "co-extensive with human life ... In such a state no one can regard any field of his affairs as personal and private."

The Islamic state recognises the sovereignty of God, which meant God was the source of all law. The Islamic state acts as the vicegerent or agent of God on earth^{[Quran 24:55]} and enforces Islamic law, which as mentioned above is both all-embracing and "totally silent" on a "vast range of human affairs". While the government follows the sharia law, when it comes to a question about which no explicit injunction is to be found in the sharia, the matter is "settled by consensus among the Muslims."

The state can be called a caliphate, but the "caliph" would not be the traditional descendant of the Quraysh tribe but (Mawdudi believed) the entire Muslim community, a "popular vicegerency". (Although there would also be an individual leader chosen by the Muslim community.) Thus the state would be not a "theocracy", but a "theodemocracy". Mawdudi believed that the sovereignty of God (hakimiya) and the sovereignty of the people are mutually exclusive. Sovereignty of human beings is simply the domination of man by man, the source of most human misery and calamity. Governance based on sovereignty other than that of God's does not just lead to inferior governance and "injustice and maladministration", but "evil."

Therefore, while Mawdudi used the term democracy to describe his state, (in part to appeal to Westernised Muslim intellectuals), his "Islamic democracy" was to be the antithesis of secular Western democracy which transfers hakimiya (God's sovereignty) to the people, who may pass laws without regard for God's commands.

The Islamic state would conduct its affairs by mutual consultation (shura) among all Muslims. The means of consultation should suit the conditions of the particular time and place but must be free and impartial. While the government follows the sharia law, when it comes to a question about which no explicit injunction is to be found in the sharia, the matter is "settled by consensus among the Muslims." Mawdudi favored giving the Islamic state exclusive right to the power of declaring jihad and ijtihad (establishing an Islamic law through "independent reasoning"), traditionally the domain of the ulama.

Rights

While no aspect of life was to be considered "personal and private" and the danger of foreign influence and conspiracies was ever present, (nationalism, for example, was "a Western concept which divided the Muslim world and thus prolonged the supremacy of Western imperialist powers"), there would also be personal freedom and no suspicion of government. Mawdudi's time spent in jail as a political prisoner led him to have a personal interest in individual rights, due process of law, and freedom of political expression. Mawdudi stated:

This espionage on the life of the individual cannot be justified on moral grounds by the government saying that it is necessary to know the secrets of the dangerous persons.... This is exactly what Islam has called as the root cause of mischief in politics. The injunction of the Prophet is: "When the ruler begins to search for the causes of dissatisfaction amongst his people, he spoils them" (Abu Dawud).

However, the basic human right in Islamic law was to demand an Islamic order and to live in it. Not included were any rights to differ with its rulers and defy its authority.

Islamic Constitution

According to Mawdudi, Islam had an "unwritten constitution" that needed "to be transformed into a written one". The constitution would not be the sharia (or the Quran, as Saudi Arabia's constitution is alleged to be) but a religious document based on "conventions" of the "rightly guided caliphs", and the "canonised verdicts of recognised jurists" (i.e. the sharia) as well as the Quran and hadith.

Model of government

In expanding on what the government of an Islamic state should look like in his book The Islamic Law and Constitution, Mawdudi took as his model the government of Muhammad and the first four caliphs (al-Khulafāʾu ar-Rāshidūn). The head of state should be the supreme head of legislature, executive and judiciary alike, but under him these three organs should function "separately and independently of one another." This head of state should be elected and must enjoy the country's confidence, but he is not limited to terms in office. No one is allowed to nominate him for the office, nor to engage in electioneering or run for office, according to another source. Because "more than one correct position" could not exist, "pluralism", i.e. competition between political views/parties, would not be allowed, and there would be only one party.

On the other hand, Mawdudi believed the state had no need to govern in the Western sense of the term, since the government and citizenry would abide by the same "infallible and inviolable divine law", power would not corrupt and no one would feel oppressed. Power and resources would be distributed fairly. There would be no grievances, no mass mobilisations, demands for political participation, or any other of the turmoil of non-Islamic governance. Since the prophet had told early Muslims "My community will never agree on an error", there was no need for establishing concrete procedures and mechanisms for popular consultation.

Since the state would be defined by its ideology—not by boundaries or ethnicity—its raison d'etre and protector would be ideology, the purity of which must be protected against any efforts to subvert it. Naturally it must be controlled and run exclusively by Muslims, and not just any Muslims but only "those who believe in the ideology on which it is based and in the Divine Law which it is assigned to administer".

The state's legislature "should consist of a body of such learned men who have the ability and the capacity to interpret Quranic injunctions and who in giving decisions, would not take liberties with the spirit or the letter of the sharia". Their legislation would be based on the practice of ijtihad (a source of Islamic law, relying on careful analogical reasoning, using both the Qu'ran and Hadith, to find a solution to a legal problem), making it more a legal organ than a political one. They must also be "persons who enjoy the confidence of the masses". They may be chosen by "the modern system of elections", or by some other method which is appropriate to "the circumstances and needs of modern times." Since upright character is essential for office holders and desire for office represents greed and ambition, anyone actively seeking an office of leadership would be automatically disqualified.

Non-Muslims or women may not be a head of state but could vote for separate legislators.

Originally Mawdudi envisioned a legislature only as a consultative body, but later proposed using a referendum to deal with possible conflicts between the head of state and the legislature, with the loser of the referendum resigning. Another later rule was allowing the formation of parties and factions during elections of representatives but not within the legislature.

In the judiciary, Mawdudi originally proposed the inquisitional system where judges implement law without discussion or interference by lawyers, which he saw as un-Islamic. After his party was "rescued" from government repression by the Pakistani judiciary he changed his mind, supporting autonomy of the judiciary and accepting the adversarial system and right of appeal.

==== Failure of Western Democracy ====
Secular Western representative democracy—despite its free elections and civil rights—is a failure (Mawdudi believed) for two reasons. Because secular society has "divorced" politics from religion, its leaders have "ceased to attach much or any importance to morality and ethics" and so ignore their constituents' interests and the common good. Furthermore, without Islam "the common people are incapable of perceiving their own true interests". An example being the Prohibition law in the United States, where despite the fact that (Mawdudi states) "it had been rationally and logically established that drinking is injurious to health, produces deleterious disorder in human society", the law banning alcohol consumption was repealed by the American Congress.

=== Non-Muslims ===
Mawdudi believed that copying cultural practices of non-Muslims was forbidden in Islam, having

very disastrous consequences upon a nation; it destroys its inner vitality, blurs its vision, befogs its critical faculties, breeds inferiority complexes, and gradually but assuredly saps all the springs of culture and sounds its death-knell. That is why the Holy Prophet has positively and forcefully forbidden the Muslims to assume the culture and mode of life of the non-Muslims.

In his commentary on Surah An-Nisa Ayat 160 he wrote

The Jews, on the whole, are not satisfied with their own deviation from the path of God. They have become such inherent criminals that their brains and resources seem to be behind almost every movement which arises for the purpose of misleading and corrupting human beings. And whenever there arises a movement to call people to the Truth, the Jews are inclined to oppose it even though they are the bearers of the Scripture and inheritors of the message of the Prophets. Their latest contribution is Communism – an ideology which is the product of a Jewish brain and which has developed under Jewish leadership. It seems ironical that the professed followers of Moses and other Prophets should be prominent as the founders and promoters of an ideology which, for the first time in human history, is professedly based on a categorical denial of, and an undying hostility to God, and which openly strives to obliterate every form of godliness. The other movement which in modern times is second only to Communism in misleading people is the philosophy of Freud. It is a strange coincidence that Freud too was a Jew.

He was appalled at (what he saw as) the

satanic flood of female liberty and licence which threatens to destroy human civilisation in the West.

Mawdudi strongly opposed the Ahmadiyya sect, a sect which Mawdudi and many other Muslims do not consider as Muslim. He preached against Ahmadiyya in his pamphlet The Qadiani Problem and the book The Finality of Prophethood.

Under the Islamic state

The rights of non-Muslims are limited under Islamic state as laid out in Mawdudi's writings. Although non-Muslim "faith, ideology, rituals of worship or social customs" would not be interfered with, non-Muslims would have to accept Muslim rule.

Islamic 'jihad' does not recognise their right to administer state affairs according to a system which, in the view of Islam, is evil. Furthermore, Islamic 'jihad' also refuses to admit their right to continue with such practices under an Islamic government which fatally affect the public interest from the viewpoint of Islam."

Non-Muslims would be eligible for "all kinds of employment", but must be "rigorously excluded from influencing policy decisions" and so not hold "key posts" in government and elsewhere. They would not have the right to vote in presidential elections or in elections of Muslim representatives. This is to ensure that "the basic policy of this ideological state remains in conformity with the fundamentals of Islam." An Islamic Republic may however allow non-Muslims to elect their own representatives to parliament, voting as separate electorates (as in the Islamic Republic of Iran). While some might see this as discrimination, Islam has been the most just, the most tolerant and the most generous of all political systems in its treatment of minorities, according to Mawdudi.

Non-Muslims would also have to pay a traditional special tax known as jizya. Under Mawdudi's Islamic state, this tax would be applicable to all able-bodied non-Muslim men—elderly, children and women being exempt—in return from their exemption from military service, (which all adult Muslim men would be subject to). Those who serve in the military are exempted. Non-Muslims would also be barred from holding certain high level offices in the Islamic state. Jizya is thus seen as a tax paid in return for protection from foreign invasion, but also as a symbol of Islamic sovereignty.

... Jews and the Christians ... should be forced to pay Jizya in order to put an end to their independence and supremacy so that they should not remain rulers and sovereigns in the land. These powers should be wrested from them by the followers of the true Faith, who should assume the sovereignty and lead others towards the Right Way.

=== Jihad ===
Mawdudi's first work to come to public attention was Al Jihad fil-Islam ("Jihad in Islam"), which was serialised in a newspaper in 1927, when he was only twenty-four. In it he maintained that because Islam is all-encompassing, the Islamic state was for all the world and should not be limited to just the "homeland of Islam" where Muslims predominate. Jihad should be used to eliminate un-Islamic rule everywhere and establish a worldwide Islamic state:

Islam wishes to destroy all states and governments anywhere on the face of the earth which are opposed to the ideology and programme of Islam, regardless of the country or the nation which rules it. The purpose of Islam is to set up a state on the basis of its own ideology and programme, regardless of which nation assumes the role of the standard-bearer of Islam or the rule of which nation is undermined in the process of the establishment of an ideological Islamic State. Islam requires the earth—not just a portion, but the whole planet.... because the entire mankind should benefit from the ideology and welfare programme [of Islam] ... Towards this end, Islam wishes to press into service all forces which can bring about a revolution and a composite term for the use of all these forces is 'Jihad'.... the objective of the Islamic 'jihād' is to eliminate the rule of an un-Islamic system and establish in its stead an Islamic system of state rule.

Mawdudi taught that the destruction of the lives and property of others was lamentable (part of the great sacrifice of jihad), but that Muslims must follow the Islamic principle that it is better to "suffer a lesser loss to save ourselves from a greater loss". Though in jihad "thousands" of lives may be lost, this cannot compare "to the calamity that may befall mankind as a result of the victory of evil over good and of aggressive atheism over the religion of God."

He explained that jihad was not only combat for God but activity by the rear echelon in support those waging combat (qitaal), including non-violent work:

In the jihad in the way of Allah, active combat is not always the role on the battlefield, nor can everyone fight in the front line. Just for one single battle preparations have often to be made for decades on end and the plans deeply laid, and while only some thousands fight in the front line there are behind them millions engaged in various tasks which, though small themselves, contribute directly to the supreme effort.

At the same time he took a more conservative line on jihad than other revivalist thinkers (such as Ayatollah Khomeini and Sayyid Qutb), distinguishing between jihad properly understood and "a crazed faith ... blood-shot eyes, shouting Allahu akbar, decapitating an unbeliever wherever they see one, cutting off heads while invoking La ilaha illa-llah [There is no god but God]". During a cease-fire with India (in 1948), he opposed the waging of jihad in Kashmir, stating that Jihad could be proclaimed only by Muslim governments, not by religious leaders.

== Mystique, personality, personal life ==
As the Amir (Guide) of Jama'at e-Islami (JI), Mawdudi remained in close contact with JI members, conducting informal discussions every day in his house between Asr and Maghrib salat prayers, although according to some, in later years discussion was replaced by answers to members' questions with any rebuttals ignored.

For his votaries in the Jama'at, Mawdudi was not only a "revered scholar, politician, and thinker, but a hallowed Mujaddid." Adding to his mystic was his survival of assassination attempts, while the Jama'at's enemies (Liaquat Ali Khan, Ghulam Muhammad, Huseyn Shaheed Suhrawardy, Ayub Khan, Zulfikar Ali Bhutto) "fell from grace" or were killed. He had a powerful command of Urdu language which he insisted on using, in order to "free Muslims minds from the influence of English."

In private he has been described as "strict but not rigid", taciturn, poised, composed, uncompromising and unyielding. His biographers have talked of his karamat (special gifts) and haybah (great presence)." His public speaking style has been described as having "great authority". Mawdudi would make his argument step-by-step with Islamic edicts, rather than attempting to excite his audience with oratory. Although he did not publicise the fact, Mawdudi was a practitioner of traditional medicine or unani tibb.

=== Family and health ===
Mawdudi has been described as close to his wife, but not able to spend much time with his six sons and three daughters due to his commitments to religious dawah and political action. Only one of his offspring, ever joined the JI. And only his second daughter Asma, showed "any scholarly promise".

Mawdudi suffered from a kidney ailment most of his life. He was often bedridden in 1945 and 1946, and in 1969 was forced to travel to England for treatment.

=== Late life ===
In April 1979, Mawdudi's long-time kidney ailment worsened and by then he also had heart problems. He went to the United States for treatment and was hospitalised in Buffalo, New York, where his second son worked as a physician. Following a few surgical operations, he died on 22 September 1979, at the age of 75. His funeral was held in Buffalo, but he was buried in an unmarked grave at his residence in Ichhra, Lahore after a very large funeral procession through the city. Yusuf al-Qaradawi led the funeral prayer for him.

== Legacy ==
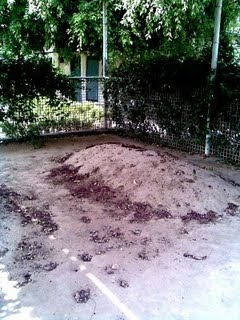
Grave of Mawdudi, Lahore

Described by Wilfred Cantwell Smith as "the most systematic thinker of modern Islam", he authored numerous works, which "covered a range of disciplines such as Qur'anic exegesis, hadith, law, philosophy, and history". These were originally penned in Urdu, and later translated into a number of other languages, including English, Arabic, Hindi, Bengali, Telugu, Tamil, Kannada, Burmese, and Malayalam. He sought to revive Islam, and, more specifically, to propagate what he understood to be "true Islam". He believed that this Islam was essential for the proper functioning of the national political order; this pivotal role provided his followers with their primary goal of bringing about the legal adoption of sharia. This was seen as entailing both the popular revival of an Islamic culture, mirroring traditional beliefs regarding widespread social norms and practices during the reigns of the Rashidun Caliphs, and the abandonment of immorality and what Mawdudi viewed as the modern evils of secularism, nationalism and socialism. He viewed these last three as foreign influences, the remnants of Western imperialism. Mawdudi was the author of the renowned Tafhim-ul-Quran

Mawdudi is regarded by many as "the most influential" of the contemporary Islamic revivalist scholars; whose efforts influenced revivalism across the Islamic World. His doctrines would also inspire the Iranian revolution and shape the ideological foundations of Al-Qaeda.

=== Pakistan and South Asia ===
In Pakistan, (where the JI claims to be the oldest religious party) it is "hard to exaggerate the importance" of that country's "current drift" toward Mawdudi's "version of Islam", according to scholar Eran Lerman.

His background as a journalist, thinker, scholar and political leader has been compared to Indian independence leader Abul Kalam Azad by admiring biographers.

He and his party are thought to have been the most important factors in Pakistan working to generate support for an Islamic state. They are thought to have helped inspire General Zia-ul-Haq to introduce "Sharisation" to Pakistan, (Sharia laws decreed by Zia included bans on interest on loans (riba), deduction by the government of 2.5% annual Zakat tax from bank accounts, the introduction of Islamic punishments such as stoning and amputation with the 1979 Hudood Ordinances. One policy of Zia's that was originally proposed by Mawdudi, and not found in classic Islamic jurisprudence (fiqh), was the introduction of separate electorates for non-Muslims (Hindus and Christians) in 1985.)

In return, Mawdudi's party was greatly strengthened by Zia with 10,000s of members and sympathisers given jobs in the judiciary and civil service early in Zia's rule.

South Asia in general, including the diaspora, including "significant numbers" in Britain, was "hugely influenced" by Mawdudi's work.

=== Arab world ===
Outside of South Asia, Muslim Brotherhood founder Hassan al-Banna and Sayyid Qutb read him, according to historian Philip Jenkins. Qutb "borrowed and expanded" Mawdudi's concept of Islam being modern, Muslims have fallen into pre-Islamic ignorance (Jahiliyya), and of the need for an Islamist revolutionary vanguard movement. His ideas influenced Abdullah Azzam, the Palestinian Islamist jurist and renewer of jihad in Afghanistan and elsewhere.

=== Iran ===
Mawdudi also had a major impact on Shia Iran, where Ayatollah Ruhollah Khomeini is reputed to have met Mawdudi as early as 1963 and later translated his works into Persian. "To the present day," according to Philip Jenkins, "Iran's revolutionary rhetoric often draws on his themes."

=== Turkey ===
In Turkey, where his name is spelled Mevdudi, from the mid-1960s onward his "full oeuvre was available in Turkey within a few years" and he became an influential figure within the local religious circles.

=== Militant Islamist movements ===
Mawdudi is considered as "second to Qutb" among the intellectual fathers of contemporary militant Islamist movements. According to Youssef M. Choueiri, "all the major contemporary radicalised" Islamist movements (the Tunisian Islamic Tendency, the Egyptian Islamic Jihad organisation, and the Muslim Brotherhood of Syria), "derive their ideological and political programmes" from the writings of Mawdudi and Sayyid Qutb.

His works have also influenced the leadership of the Islamic State of Iraq and the Levant in their ideology.

== Timeline of Abul A'la Mawdudi's life ==
- 1903 – Born in Aurangabad, Hyderabad State, colonial India
- 1918 – Started career as journalist in Bijnore newspaper
- 1920 – Appointed as editor of the daily Taj, based in Jabalpur
- 1921 – Learned Arabic from Maulana Abdul Salam Niazi in Delhi
- 1921 – Appointed as editor daily Muslim newspaper
- 1926 – Took the Sanad of Uloom e Aqaliya wa Naqalia from Darul Uloom Fatehpuri, Delhi
- 1928 – Took the Sanad in Jamay Al-Tirmidhi and Muatta Imam Malik Form same Teacher
- 1925 – Appointed as editor Al-jameeah, Delhi
- 1927 – Wrote Al Jihad fil Islam
- 1933 – Started Tarjuman-ul-Qur'an from Hyderabad
- 1937 – aged 34, introduced to South Asia's premier Muslim poet-philosopher, Allama Muhammad Iqbal, by Chaudhry Niaz Ali Khan at Lahore
- 1938 – Aged 35, moved to Pathankot from Hyderabad Deccan and joined the Dar ul Islam Trust Institute, which was established in 1936 by Chaudhry Niaz Ali Khan on the advice of Allama Muhammad Iqbal for which Chaudhry Niaz Ali Khan donated 66 acres (270,000 m^{2}) of land from his vast 1,000-acre (4.0 km^{2}) estate in Jamalpur, 5 km west of Pathankot
- 1941 – Founded Jamaat-e-Islami Hind at Lahore, British India; appointed as Amir
- 1942 – Jamaat's headquarters moved to Pathankot
- 1942 – Started writing a commentary of the Qur'an called Tafhim-ul-Quran
- 1947 – Jamaat-e-Islami Pakistan headquarters moved to Lahore, Pakistan
- 1948 – Campaign for Islamic constitution and government
- 1948 – Thrown in jail by the Pakistani government for fatwa on jihad in Kashmir
- 1949 – Pakistani government accepted Jamaat's resolution for Islamic constitution
- 1950 – Released from jail
- 1953 – Sentenced to death for his historical part in the agitation against Ahmadiyya to write a booklet Qadiani Problem. He was sentenced to death by a military court, but it was never carried out;
- 1953 – Death sentence commuted to life imprisonment and later canceled.
- 1958 – Jamaat-e-Islami banned by Martial Law Administrator Field Martial Ayub Khan
- 1964 – Sentenced to jail
- 1964 – Released from jail
- 1971 – In the question of united Pakistan or separation of the East Pakistan (later Bangladesh) he relinquished his authority to East Pakistan Shura (consultative body of Jamaat)
- 1972 – Completed Tafhim-ul-Quran
- 1972 – Resigned as Ameer-e-Jamaat
- 1978 – Published his last book "Seerat-e-Sarwar-e-Aalam" in two volumes.
- 1979- Received King Faisal International Prize
- 1979 – Left for the United States for a medical treatment
- 1979 – Died in Buffalo, United States
- 1979 – Buried in Ichhra, Lahore

== Selected bibliography ==
Mawdudi wrote 73 books, 120 booklets and pamphlets, and made more than 1,000 speeches and press statements. His magnum opus was the 30 years in progress translation (tafsir) in Urdu of the Qur'an, Tafhim ul-Qur'an (The Meaning of the Qur'an, also Introductions to the Qur'an), intended to give the Qur'an a self-claim interpretation. It became widely read throughout the South Asia and has been translated into several languages.

Some of his books translated into English.

- Al Jihad fil Islam. Written in 1927, it was Mawdudi's first book, at the age of 24, comprising some 600 pages and hailed by Muhammad Iqbal "as the best explication of the concept of jihad in any language."
- Towards Understanding Islam
- Purdah & the Status of Women in Islam
- The Islamic Law and Constitution
- Let us be Muslims
- The Islamic Way of Life
- A Short History of the Revivalist Movement in Islam
- Human Rights in Islam
- Four basic Qur'anic terms
- The process of Islamic revolution
- Unity of the Muslim world
- The moral foundations of the Islamic movement
- Economic System of Islam
- The road to peace and salvation
- The Qadiani Problem
- The Question of Dress
- The Rights of Non-Muslims in Islamic State
- Caliphate and Kingship (Khilafat o Malookiat)

Other noteworthy books by Mawdudi.

- Islamic Law and its Introduction in Pakistan
- Khutabat: Fundamentals of Islam
- System of Government Under the Holy Prophet

== See also ==
- Islamic schools and branches
- Naeem Siddiqui
- Tehreek-e-Islami
- Contemporary Islamic philosophy

Party political offices
Preceded by Party created	Ameer of Jamaat-e-Islami; 1941–1972	Succeeded by Mian Tufail Mohammad
