= Association of Students for Alternative Politics =

Student wing of Indian political party

- Formation: 28 September 2014; 12 years ago (as CYSS) 20 May 2025; 17 months ago (as ASAP)
- Type: Student wing
- Legal status: Active
- Headquarters: New Delhi
- Region served: India
- Members: 1 million
- Chair Person: Arvind Kejriwal
- President Panjab University: Ayush Khatkar
- Former Punjab Coordinator: Harsh Singh
- Parent organization: Aam Aadmi Party

Association of Students for Alternative Politics (ASAP) is the student wing of the Aam Aadmi Party (AAP). The organisation was initially founded as Chhatra Yuva Sangharsh Samiti (CYSS) on 28 September 2014. However, the CYSS was later replaced by the ASAP, which was established on 20 May 2025.

== Students' Union elections ==
In October 2022, CYSS won Panjab University Campus Students Council election, defeating Akhil Bharatiya Vidyarthi Parishad. In 2015, CYSS also contested Delhi University Student elections.

== See also ==
- All India Students' Federation
- Students' Federation of India
- All India Students Association
- Akhil Bharatiya Vidyarthi Parishad
- Student Organisation of India
- National Students' Union of India
