= Somya Thakur =

Indian wheelchair model

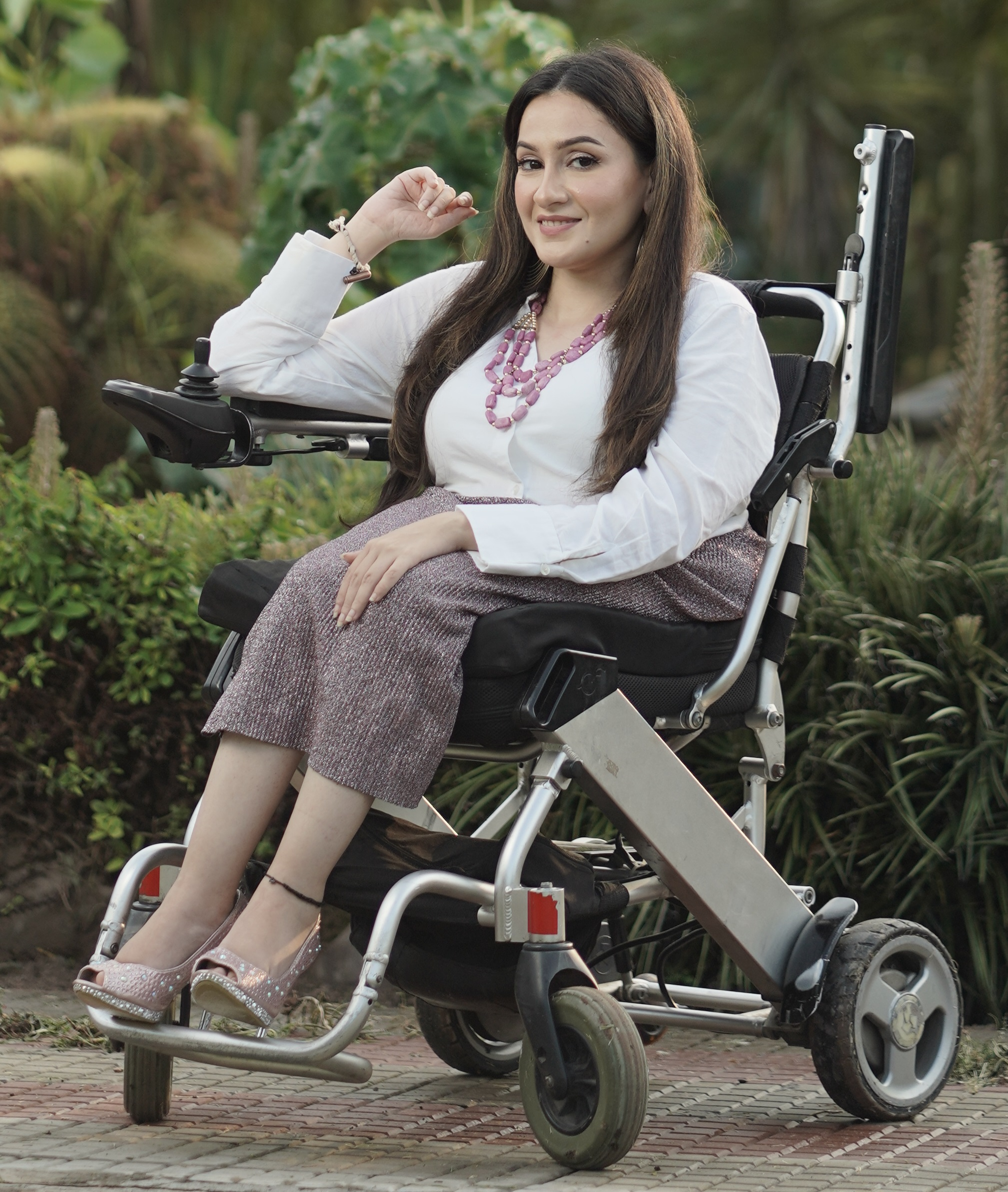

Somya Thakur is from Himachal Pradesh and lives in Tricity. She was Miss wheelchair World India 2022–23.

== Education ==
Somya completed her primary and secondary education from Satluj Public School, Panchkula, Haryana. She graduated in computer application and has an MBA in IT & Telecoms Human Resources from the University Institute of Applied Management Sciences at Panjab University.

She works as a human resources professional for a private company.

== Medical history ==
She met with an accident when she was 11 days old, she slipped from the hands of caretaker. Because of that she got a fracture of her right thigh. When medical staff attempted to close the fracture, they dislocating her hip. In the following year, during the process of her treatmentm she fractured her legs three more times. In childhood, due to impaired movement, her muscles failed to develop properly, leaving her unable to stand and walk.

== Miss Wheelchair World contest ==
Thakur represented India in the "Miss Wheelchair World 2022 Contest".
