= Delhi School of Journalism protests =

Protests by Students of Delhi School of Journalism, were a series of continuous protests done by students against the Delhi School of Journalism administration and University of Delhi administration in the time period between 2018 and 2020.

It was done demanding basic infrastructure, hostel, reduction of semester fees and hiring of permanent faculty. The protests gathered support from multiple student organisations such as AISA, NSUI, and Chatra RJD.

== Background ==
Delhi School of Journalism started in 2017 through a makeshift arrangement hosted at University Stadium in North Campus of University of Delhi. It did not have any proper classrooms and infrastructure needed for functioning of a Journalism course. The administration promised to resolve all issues and provide necessary infrastructure in few months. Students of inaugural batch started to demand minimum infrastructure since March 2018. As a result, a temporary library was started with seating capacity of 6 people for a batch of 120 students. Later, with no progress happening and with start of technical papers in the second year, the demand of basic infrastructure and media lab took momentum and students started their agitation which continued for more than a year in phases.

== Demands ==
The students started indefinite sit in protest and classes were suspended. The demands of students included media lab, access to university central library, sporting facilities, a proper cafeteria, review of fees, permanent appointment of faculty, hostel facility for outsiders, removal of compulsory foreign language courses and I.C.T lab. There were also allegations of mismanagement of funds and students demanded an independent investigation body and immediate removal of Honorary Director Professor J. P. Dubey and Officer on Special Duty Manasvini M. Yogi.

== Suspension ==
Eight students were suspended including Prashant Yadav, Suman Shekhar, Neel Madhav, Shivani, Mohammad Ali, Ankit Shukla and Alishan Jafri between protests for allegedly blocking the directors door and not letting the classes function. The suspension gathered solidarity from across the spectrum. The suspension was later revoked and a written promise was made to resolve all their issues in a limited time frame by Neeta Sehgal, the proctor of University of Delhi.

== Hunger strike ==
Students resorted to agitation again after their demands were not met as promised. The students in a bid to meet the Vice Chancellor of Delhi University climbed the gates of his office and a police action was followed. Six of protesting students started an indefinite hunger strike soon after and other students started a reach out campaign to engage other Delhi University students. The hunger strike gathered mass support from various leaders and organisations such as Manoj Jha, DUTA, JNUSU, Jamia, AISA, NSUI other students and colleges in Delhi. The hunger strike continued for five days and was broken on sixth day with a resolve to organise a mass rally against privatization, Delhi University administration and the MHRD. Students organised a mass "Chhatra Sangrash Rally" in the North Campus of University of Delhi.

== Aftermath ==
The protests resulted into bringing small substantial changes but failed to make any large impact. The protests is credited to put the university administration on backfoot on their plans of new self financing courses. The students continued to raise their grievance at different levels even after.
