= Neha Bora =

Indian student activist (born 1997)

- Bora in 2026
- Born: 1997 (age 28–29); Khatima, India
- Education: Delhi University (BA), Ambedkar University (MA)
- Organization: All India Students' Association
- Known for: Active participant in India's Gen-Z movements

Neha Bora is an Indian activist and PhD student. They (Note: Bora is non-binary and uses they/them pronouns.) are the national president of the All India Students' Association (AISA) and an active participant in India's Gen-Z movements.

== Early life and education ==
Bora is from Khatima, Uttarakhand, India. Their father served in the Indian Army so they moved from city to city in their childhood. They are also a theatre artist. They completed their BA from Delhi University, MA from Ambedkar University, and are pursuing a PhD from the School of Arts and Aesthetics, Jawaharlal Nehru University.

== Activism ==
Bora gained national attention through their involvement in the 2026 Delhi Jantar Mantar protests, which called for the resignation of Union Education Minister Dharmendra Pradhan over allegations concerning paper leaks and irregularities in the NEET examination. Along with Sonam Wangchuk, Bora undertook a 23-day hunger strike in the national capital. Reports described the physical toll of the hunger strike on the participants.

Bora also participated in protests associated with the Cockroach Janta Party, a student movement that developed from an online political satire campaign. During the protests, Bora and other demonstrators called for the removal of Delhi Police Commissioner Anurag Kumar, alleging police brutality during the Sansad Chalo march organised by the group.

In October 2026, Bora's remarks praising Bangladesh's 2024 student-led uprising generated further political controversy. BJP leaders interpreted the remarks as support for a Bangladesh-style regime change in India through street protests, while the allegation represented their characterisation of Bora's statements rather than an established finding about their intentions.

Bora has spoken on the privatisation of education, mob lynching, paper leak, justice for Bilkis Bano, Gaza genocide and Gaza humanitarian crisis.

Neha Bora joined the 2026 Jharkhand student protests on 7 August 2026.

In October 2026, Bora was among the protesters who were detained during demonstrations in New Delhi over alleged irregularities in the Special Intensive Revision of electoral rolls. During one demonstration, they were reported to have attempted to climb a police barricade as protesters tried to reach Jantar Mantar.

After being released from the detention, a Special Executive Magistrate served them a notice seeking their explanation regarding why they should not give a personal bond for a sum of ₹10,000 and one surety to keep the peace during the time of investigation due to the reasons of sloganeering at the Mandi House, previous protests despite prohibition orders and encouragement of participating in an unauthorized demonstration at Connaught Place. Bora challenged the notice in the Delhi High Court, claiming that there were no sufficient grounds to serve the notice.

However, on 23 October, their challenge was turned down by the Delhi High court and it was concluded that there was enough material for proceeding but they had to be provided with that material and observe the natural justice.

On 24 October, Bora refused to sign the bond. Bora was then summoned to the magistrate, who provided them with the materials and gave until 29 October 2026 to make their submissions.

=== Support for Umar Khalid ===
Bora has publicly supported the release of Umar Khalid, who has been detained under the Unlawful Activities (Prevention) Act related to allegations of instigating violence in the 2020 Delhi riots. In an interview with The Indian Express, they said that they and AISA support the release of Khalid. Bora has also advocated for the release of another prisoner, Sharjeel Imam, who is currently imprisoned in Tihar Jail, also under the Unlawful Activities (Prevention) Act for his alleged instigation of violence during the anti-CAA protests.

=== Controversy over remarks on Bangladesh style regime change in India ===
In October 2026, Neha Bora praised Bangladesh's 2024 student-led uprising, saying it had "shown us the way" for youth movements in India. The remarks prompted accusations on them and opposition-linked protesters of seeking a Bangladesh-style regime change through street mobilisation.

On 14 October 2026, Bora released a video message of support to Bangladesh's Socialist Students Front on the occasion of its sixth national conference. This came days after Nahid Islam, the leader of anti-Sheikh Hasina agitation in Bangladesh expressed solidarity with India's Gen Z movement. In the video, Bora said that the Gen Z movement seen across India had first started in Bangladesh, and said "we take inspiration from you" and offered "red salute to the youth of Bangladesh". Many BJP leaders including national spokesperson Pradeep Bhandari shared the clip and called it "an open admission of regime change".

=== Brahmin remarks ===
In November 2026, Bora was criticized by the leaders of Samajwadi Party over their remarks, the INDIA bloc leaders called it "Radical thinking". BJP spokesperson Pradeep Bhandari also criticised their remarks accused them of promoting what he described as "anti-Hindu politics". Former Shiv Sena(UBT) leader Priyanka Chaturvedi also criticised the remarks.

Following the criticism, a complaint was filed against Bora at the Pithoragarh Kotwali police station on 6 November 2026. The complaint stated that the remarks by Bora are disrespectful to the Brahmins and may hamper communal harmony and order.
