= Jawaharlal Nehru University Students' Union =

Student union of Jawaharlal Nehru University

- Location: Jawaharlal Nehru University, New Delhi-110067, India

The Jawaharlal Nehru University Students' Union (JNUSU) is the students' union at Jawaharlal Nehru University, New Delhi.

The JNUSU follows the student drafted JNUSU constitution.

The Students' Union has four central panel positions. These are the posts of President, Vice President, General Secretary and Joint Secretary.

An EPW study notes how in the last four decades (1974–2008 and 2012–17), in the JNUSU elections, the Students’ Federation of India (SFI) has won the post of president 22 times while All India Students’ Association (AISA) has won it 11 times while Akhil Bhartia Vidhyarthi Parishad (ABVP) has won it once. Notable presidents of JNUSU include CPI(M) politician Sitaram Yechury who was president in 1977–78, Congress National Secretary Shakeel Ahmed Khan in 1992–93 and Congress Rajya Sabha MP Syed Naseer Hussain in 1999–2000. Vijoo Krishnan became the president of JNUSU in 1998. D Raghunandan, D. P. Tripathi, Nalini Ranjan Mohanty also served as President.

Chandrashekhar Prasad another president of the JNUSU was assassinated after joining politics in Bihar in 1997.

== JNUSU elections ==
JNUSU elections are conducted by students through an elected Election Committee. In 2006, the Lyngdoh Committee, formed to frame guidelines for 'Students’ Union Elections' across the country noted that there is no need for altering the JNU model and that JNU's model would be "difficult to replicate elsewhere". However the JNUSU passed a resolution in 2016 to hold the elections via the JNUS constitution and not the Lyngdoh Committee model.

The Students Union has four central panel positions. These are the posts of President, Vice President, General Secretary and Joint Secretary. Other posts include Councillors for each of the Schools and as well as a part time Councillor. In 2019 there were 43 Councillors.

After 2015, the left parties have been fighting the elections as one unit under the umbrella of United Left.

== Union Presidents ==
JNU is known for best Presidential debates by all candidates before elections.

SFI has won the post of President the maximum number of times in the last 40 years, (Note: 1974–2008 and 2012–17) a total of 22 times. All India Students’ Association (AISA) follows by having won the presidents post 11 times. SFI, AISF and AISA are the student wings of the Communist Parties.

=== Presidents of JNUSU ===
| President | Student Organization | Duration | First Runner–up | Student Organization | Vice–President | Student Organization |
|---|---|---|---|---|---|---|
| Aditi Mishra | AISA (United Left) | 2025–2026 | Vikas Patel | ABVP | Kizhakoot Gopika Babu | SFI (United Left) |
| Nitish Kumar Yadav | AISA (United Left) | 2024–2025 | Shikha Swaraj | ABVP | Manisha | DSF (United Left) |
| Dhananjay | AISA (United Left) | 2023–2024 | Umesh Chandra Ajmeera | ABVP | Avijit Ghosh | SFI (United Left) |
| Aishe Ghosh | SFI (United Left) | 2019–2023 | Manish Jangid | ABVP | Saket Moon | DSF (United Left) |
| N Sai Balaji | AISA (United Left) | 2018–2019 | Lalit Pandey | ABVP | Sarika Chaudhary | DSF (United Left) |
| Geeta Kumari | AISA (United Left) | 2017–2018 | Nidhi Tripathi | ABVP | Simone Zoya Khan | |
| Mohit K Pandey | AISA (United Left) | 2016–2017 | Sonpimple Rahul Punaram | BAPSA | Amal Pullarkkattu | SFI (United Left)| |
| Kanhaiya Kumar | AISF | 2015–2016 | Vijay Kumar | AISA | Shehla Rashid | AISA (United Left) |
| Ashutosh Kumar Yadav | AISA | 2014–2015 | | | | |
| Akbar Chawdhary | AISA | 2013–2014 | | | | |
| V. Lenin Kumar | DSF | 2012–2013 | | | | |
| Sucheta De | AISA | 2011–2012 | | | Abhishek Kumar Yadav | AISA |
| Election did not take place | | 2009–2011 | Election did not take place | | | |
| Sandeep Singh | AISA | 2007–2008 | | | | |
| Dhananjay Tripathi | SFI | 2006–2007 | | | Tyler Walker Williams | AISA |
| Mona Das | AISA | 2005–2006 | | | | |
| Mona Das | AISA | 2004–2005 | | | | |
| Rohit Azad | SFI | 2003–2004 | | | | |
| Rohit Azad | SFI | 2002–2003 | | | | |
| Albeena Shakil | SFI | 2001–2002 | | | | |
| Sandeep Mahapatra | ABVP | 2000–2001 | | | | |
| Syed Naseer Hussain | SFI | 1999–2000 | | | | |
| Vijoo Krishnan | SFI | 1998–1999 | | | | |
| Batti Lal Bairwa | SFI | 1996–1997 | | | | |
| Chandrashekhar Prasad | AISA | 1994–1995 | | | | |
| Chandrashekhar Prasad | AISA | 1993–1994 | | | | |
| Shakeel Ahmed Khan | SFI | 1992–1993 | | | Chandrashekhar Prasad | |
| Tanvir Akhtar | NSUI | 1991–1992 | | | Shakeel Ahmed Khan | SFI |
| Sitaram Yechury | SFI | 1977–1978 | | | | |
| Prakash Karat | SFI | 1976–1977 | | | | |
| D. P. Tripathi | SFI | 1975–1976 | | | | |

While some JNUSU presidents joined politics after JNU other presidents such as V. Lenin Kumar and Dhananjay Tripathi pursued academics. Those who joined politics include Ashutosh Kumar who joined CPI–ML(Liberation), Kanhaiya Kumar joined the CPI and Sandeep Singh joined the Indian National Congress.

Sandeep Mahapatra has been the only JNUSU president from Akhil Bharatiya Vidyarthi Parishad (ABVP).

== Notable student organisations ==
These student organisations contest in JNUSU:

• Progressive Students' Association (PSA)

- Students' Federation of India (SFI)
- All India Students Association (AISA)
- National Students' Union of India (NSUI)
- All India Students Federation (AISF)
- Democratic Students' Federation (DSF)
- Akhil Bharatiya Vidyarthi Parishad (ABVP)
- Samajwadi Chhatra Sabha (SCS)
- Chhatra Rashtriya Janata Dal (CRJD)
- Muslim Students Federation (MSF)
- Birsa Ambedkar Phule Students' Association (BAPSA)
- Mithila Student Union (MSU) (Supporting DSU)
- All India Democratic Students Organisation (AIDSO) (Supporting left unity)
- Ambedkar Students' Association (ASA) (Supporting BAPSA)
- All India Revolutionary Students Federation (1985 – 2001) (Organised student protest – supporting DSU)
- United Dalit Students’ Forum (UDSF) (Supporting BAPSA)
- Students For Society (SFS) (Supporting DSU & BASO)
- Student Organisation of India (SOI) (Previously)
- All Idu Mishmi Students Union (AIMSU) (Supporting DSU)

== See also ==
- Delhi University Students Union
- Banaras Hindu University Students' Union
