= Dhananjay (politician) =

Indian politician and activist

President of the Jawaharlal Nehru University Students' Union
- In office 2023–2024
- Preceded by: Aishe Ghosh
- Succeeded by: Nitish Kumar

Personal details
- Born: Gaya district, Bihar, India
- Party: Communist Party of India (Marxist–Leninist) Liberation
- Education: B.A. – DU (2017); M.A. – AUD (2020); M.Phil. – JNU (2022); Ph.D. – JNU (pursuing)
- Alma mater: Jawaharlal Nehru University

Dhananjay is an Indian politician and student leader of AISA associated with the CPI(ML)L. He served as president of the JNU Students' Union (JNUSU) for the 2023–24 term, as the first Dalit student in nearly three decades to hold the position. In 2025, he entered active politics and contested the Bihar Legislative Assembly election from the Bhorey constituency in Gopalganj district as a candidate of the CPI(ML)L.

== Early life and education ==
Dhananjay hails from Bara village in the Guraru block of Gaya district, Bihar.

His father is a retired cop and his mother is a homemaker.

He completed a Bachelor of Arts degree from the University of Delhi in 2017 and a Master of Arts in 2020 from the Dr. B. R. Ambedkar University Delhi, and an M.Phil. in 2022 from the Jawaharlal Nehru University (JNU), New Delhi, where he is pursuing a PhD.

== Student politics ==
At JNU, Dhananjay became active with the All India Students' Association (AISA), the student wing of the CPI(ML) Liberation. He was elected as the president of the JNUSU in the 2023–24 election on the AISA-backed panel.

He defeated Umesh Chandra Ajmeera of Akhil Bharatiya Vidyarthi Parishad with a margin of 922 votes.

His victory marked the return of a Dalit student leader to the post after nearly three decades.

In 2026, he registered a complaint to the National Commission for Scheduled Castes, against Santishree Dhulipudi Pandit, Vice Chancellor of JNU, accusing her of anti-Dalit and discriminative comments on a podcast.

== Political career ==
After completing his term at JNU, Dhananjay joined active politics with the CPI(ML) Liberation.

The party nominated him to contest the 2025 Bihar Legislative Assembly election from the Bhorey Assembly constituency, a seat reserved for Scheduled Castes.

== See also ==
- Jawaharlal Nehru University Students' Union
- Communist Party of India (Marxist–Leninist) Liberation
- All India Students’ Association
- Aishe Ghosh
