= Panjab University Campus Students Council =

Students' union at Panjab University

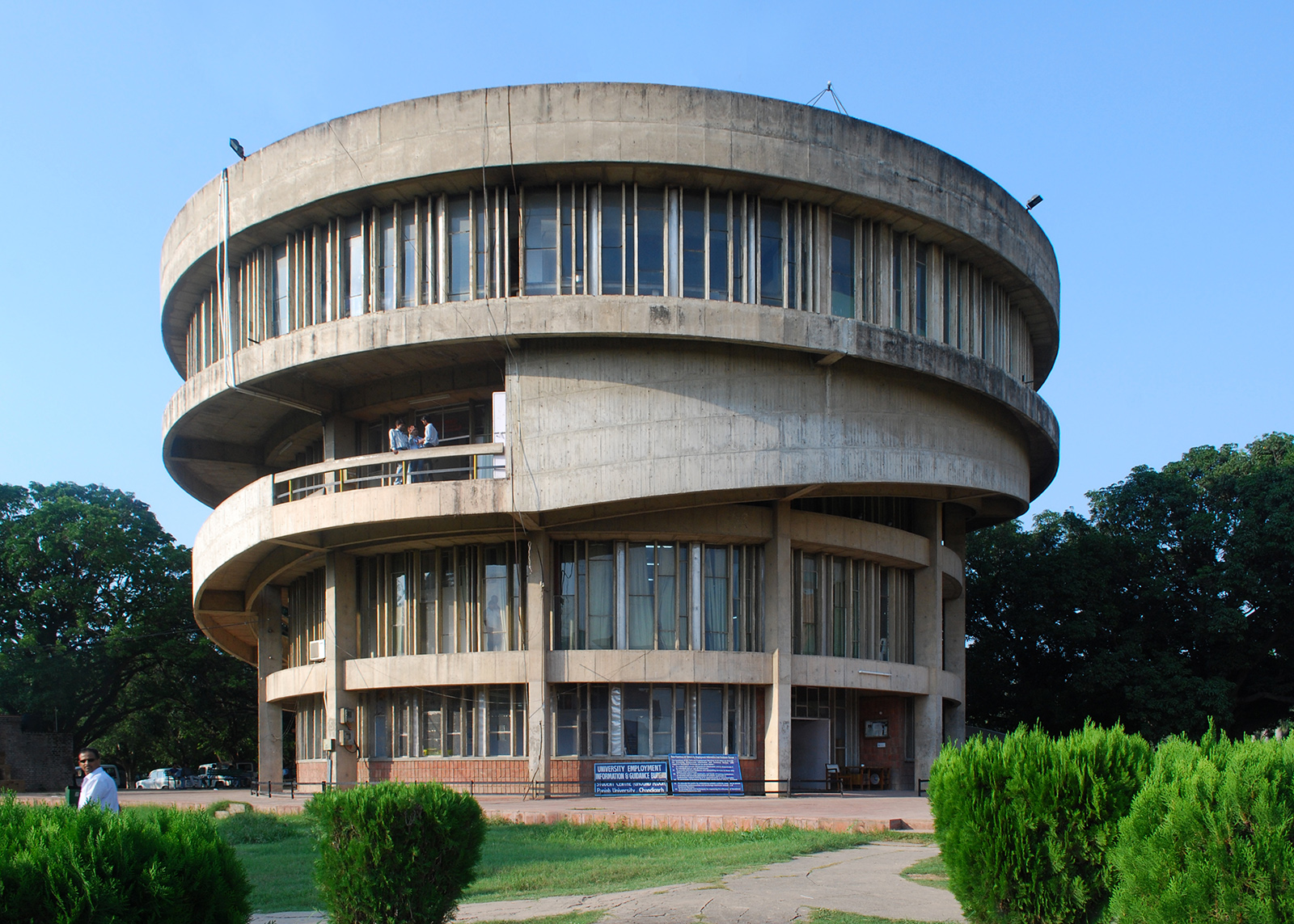
Student Centre, Panjab University

Panjab University Campus Students Council (PUCSC) is students' union consisting of the departmental representatives and other office bearers like President, Vice-President, Secretary and Joint-Secretary along with 123 Departmental Representatives (DRs) directly elected by the students from the various teaching departments on the Panjab University, Chandigarh campus. Furthermore, these elected office-bearers and department representatives elect the remaining five members of the executive of the Council. The Dean Student Welfare is ex officio Chairman of the Council. Elections are held every year in August–September months. There is ban on property defacement for clean elections.

== Student representation ==
Panjab University has over 60% female students but only 15-20% of girl students vote or participate in election process, and until 2018, the council president's post was never headed by a girl in the history of the university elections. Thus PUCSC politics are mostly dominated by male students. As of 2018, PU has about 15541 student voters with UIET having the most voters, about 2451 students followed by UILS with 1345 and Department of Laws with 1050. But sometimes UIET and Law Dept. get less representation in election panels. Freebies are offered by student organisations to lure students especially freshers by movie tickets, free meals, Disc Parties, free trips, etc. Parties have to overcome regional and language barriers of students as the university has students from different parts of India. In 2015, along with student council elections, PU authorities also conducted a referendum to decide whether campus should be made a vehicle-free zone or not. In 2015, there was only a 56% turnout with 8,131 voters out of total 14,000 voted. In 2016, NOTA was introduced first time in campus elections and was used by 6 to 9 percent of students.

== Budget ==
In the academic year 2018-19, PUCSC's budget was ₹35.8 lakh (US$37,000).

== Elections in affiliated colleges ==
Elections are also held in colleges only in Chandigarh that are affiliated to Panjab University and these are:

- Goswami Ganesh Dutta Sanatan Dharma College, Sector 32 (GGDSDC-32)
- Dayanand Anglo-Vedic College, Sector 10 (DAVC-10)
- Mehr Chand Mahajan Dayanand Anglo-Vedic College for Women, Sector 36 (MCMDAVCW-36)
- Sri Guru Gobind Singh College, Sector 26 (SGGSC-26)
- Guru Gobind Singh College for Women, Sector 26 (GGSCW-26)
- Dev Samaj College for Women, Sector 45 (DSCW-45)
- Post Graduate Government College, Sector 11 (PGGC-11)
- Post Graduate Government College for Girls, Sector 11 (PGGCG-11)
- Post Graduate Government College, Sector 46 (PGGC-46)
- Post Graduate Government College for Girls, Sector 42 (PGGCG-42)
- Government College for Commerce and Business Administration, Sector 50 (GCCBA-50)

== Politics of Panjab University ==
Panjab University student politics has historically reflected a mix of national party affiliations and local student interests. Over time, however, concerns have emerged among both former and current students regarding increasing political interference and the erosion of student-led autonomy within the Panjab University Campus Student Council (PUCSC). Several student leaders and independent observers have referred to the PUCSC as a "puppet council", alleging that many elected representatives act under the influence of external political actors rather than the student body.

== Student Issues ==
=== Hostel Allotment Controversies ===
The process of hostel room allotment at Panjab University has long been a source of contention among students. Although allotment is officially based on academic merit, course type, and seat availability, students have alleged that political influence and discretionary powers of wardens often determine final allocations.

Over the years, several complaints have emerged about:

- Favouritism shown to student leaders and their associates
- Room blocking through unofficial channels before general allotment
- Lack of clarity in waiting list procedures and criteria for allotment
- Warden-level discretion overriding merit-based allocation

These alleged irregularities have contributed to widespread dissatisfaction and calls for reform. In response, the university has announced the introduction of an online hostel allotment system aimed at ensuring transparency, uniformity, and reduction in human interference during the process. The move is expected to streamline applications, generate digital records, and limit the role of intermediaries.

=== Lack of a Student Constitution ===
Although the Panjab University Campus Student Council (PUCSC) is an elected body representing thousands of students, it currently operates without a formal written constitution. This issue has been raised repeatedly by student leaders and observers, who argue that the absence of a governing document undermines the council's autonomy and accountability.

The lack of a constitution has resulted in:

- Undefined roles and powers of office-bearers
- No formal oversight mechanisms for the usage of student welfare funds
- Limited ability to hold authorities accountable
- Absence of procedural consistency across different student councils

In 2023–24, PUCSC President Jatinder Singh included the adoption of a written constitution in his election manifesto. During his tenure, a draft student council constitution was submitted and accepted in principle by the university administration. A committee was officially constituted to deliberate on and finalize the draft. However, as of May 2025, not a single meeting of the committee has been held, and no further progress has been made on its implementation.

=== Misuse and Non-Usage of Earmarked Funds ===
Students have alleged that key welfare funds such as the Student Holiday Home Fund and Youth Welfare Fund, Student Council Fund for Trips and Excursions, collected annually through student fees, have remained either underutilized or misappropriated. The Student Holiday Home Fund, in particular, has drawn criticism after it was revealed that the university-owned properties in Shimla and Dalhousie have been in disrepair or inaccessible to students for years, despite continuous fee collection. Multiple student leaders have demanded audits and greater financial transparency around the usage of these earmarked funds.

==== Campus Reporter: The Student Magazine ====
The Campus Reporter, Panjab University's official student magazine and yearbook, has also faced criticism for being largely non-functional in recent years. While it is intended to be a student-led platform for creative and journalistic expression, several student groups have pointed out that student participation is minimal, with editorial and content decisions often made without democratic involvement. Attempts to revive the publication have been sporadic and largely unsuccessful.

==== Political Influence in Campus Events ====
Another frequently raised issue is the selection process for Convenors and student representatives in university-sponsored events and festivals. Rather than being selected based on skill, merit, or past performance, students have alleged that convenor positions are often distributed based on political affiliations or proximity to influential student leaders. This has reportedly discouraged many non-partisan students from participating and has contributed to growing apathy in campus cultural and academic events.

== Council Presidents ==
Since 1977, the Council was usually represented by students leaders of campus-based parties like SOPU (Student Organisation of Panjab University) and PUSU (Panjab University Students' Union). But in 2013, first time Congress-affiliated NSUI won the Council President's post new President of Panjab University Ayush Khatkar from (Jind, Haryana). In 2015, as another surprise, first-time PUCSC president from Shiromani Akali Dal (Badal)'s student wing SOI was elected. In 2016, Amritpal Singh, first SC presidential candidate in PU from Students For Society (SFS) gave an impressive performance with 2494 votes the first time in campus student politics due to its successful rallies. In 2018 Kanupriya was elected as the first female president of PUCSC, of Panjab University, from SFS. In October 2022, Aam Aadmi Party (AAP) students' wing Chhatra Yuva Sangharsh Samiti (CYSS) candidate Aayush Khatkar became the President of PUCSC.

=== Presidents of PUCSC ===
President	Student Organization(s)	Year	First Runner-up	Student Organization(s)
Ankit Bidhan	ABVP	2026-2027	Aadil Brar	ASAP+PUDF+INSO
Gaurav veer Sohal	ABVP	2025-2026	Sumit Kumar	SF+HIMSU Alliance
Anurag Dalal	DSF+SOPU+HIMSU+NSUI Rebels	2024-2025	Prince Chaudhary	CYSS Alliance
Jatinder Singh	NSUI	2023-2024	Divyansh Thakur	CYSS Alliance
Aayush Khatkar	CYSS Alliance	2022-2023	Harish Gujjar	ABVP Alliance
NA	NA	2021-2022	-	-
NA	NA	2020-2021	-	-
Chetan	SOI Alliance	2019–2020	Paras Rattan	ABVP+INSO Alliance
Kanupriya	SFS	2018–2019	Ashish Rana	ABVP
Jashan kamboj	NSUI	2017–2018	Hassanpreet Kaur	SFS
Nishant Kaushal	Student Front (PUSU+NSO+NSUI Rebels)	2016-2017	Piyush Anand	SOI+ABVP+INSO
Jasmeen Kang	SOI+NSO	2015–2016	Baljinder Singh	PUSU+ABVP
Divyanshu Budhiraja	NSUI+NSO	2014–2015	Rachit Duggal	SOPU+SOI
Chandan Rana	NSUI	2013-2014	Satwant Singh	PUSU+NSO+INSO
Satinder Singh Satti	SOPU+HSA+NSO	2012–2013	Abhinav Puri	PUSU+NSUI
Pushpinder Sharma	SOPU	2011–2012	Sumit Goklaney	PUSU
Gurvindervir Singh Aulakh	PUSU+INSO	2010–2011	Mohit Taneja	

== Notable student organisations ==
In 1974, Ajaib Singh founded Progressive Students' Union (PSU) as in 1977 first elected president was Bhupinderpal Singh Khosa. PUSU was formed in 1977 and SOPU in 1985 while NSUI first contested at PU Campus in 1997 and ABVP won an office-bearer post in 2000. Different Organisations take part in Activities and compaigning.

=== Non political organisations ===
- Ambedkar Students' Association (ASA) is a non political student organization and doesn't participates in PUCSC elections but works for welfare of all poor students on campus especially from Other Backward Class (OBC), Scheduled Castes and Scheduled Tribes (SC/ST) communities.

=== Political organisations ===
These student organisations participate in PUCSC elections:

- PUSU (Since 1977)
- SATH (Since 2019) , " Students for Revolution " focusing on collective leadership as well as student empowerment
- SOPU (Since 1985)
- Democratic Students' Front
- Students For Society (SFS)
- ABVP, student wing affiliated to BJP-RSS
- NSUI, student wing of Indian National Congress
- SOI, student wing of Shiromani Akali Dal
- INSO, student wing of Haryana based Jannayak Janta Party
- HPSU (Himachal Pradesh Students Union) , A non political student organisation
- CYSS (Chhatra Yuva Sangharsh Samiti), student wing of Aam Aadmi Party
- All India Students Association (AISA), student wing of Communist Party of India (Marxist–Leninist) Liberation
- GGSU, student wing of Gandhi group gang of Khanna
- PFUS, Panjab Feminist Union of Students
- SAP
- KCSU
