= Chandrashekhar Prasad =

Indian politician (1964–1997)

- Born: 20 September 1964; Siwan, Bihar, India
- Died: 31 March 1997 (aged 32); Siwan, Bihar, India
- Cause of death: Assassination
- Education: Sainik School, Tilaiya; Patna University; Jawaharlal Nehru University
- Occupations: Activist; Student
- Organization: All India Students Association (AISA)
- Title: President of Jawaharlal Nehru University Students' Union
- Term: 1993-1995
- Political party: Communist Party of India (Marxist-Leninist) Liberation
- Mother: Kaushalya Devi

Chandrashekar Prasad (20 September 1964 – 31 March 1997), popularly known as Chandu and Comrade Chandrashekhar was a student leader and later an activist affiliated to the Communist Party of India (Marxist-Leninist) Liberation. He graduated from the Jawaharlal Nehru University, and served as the president of the Jawaharlal Nehru University Students' Union for two terms. Prasad played a key role in the development of All India Students Association.

On 31 March 1997, he was assassinated by sharpshooters allegedly in the employ of Mohammad Shahabuddin of the Rashtriya Janata Dal, while addressing street corner meetings in the district town of Siwan, Bihar in support of a strike. His assassination led to remarkable student protests across India. In 2012, four people were convicted of his murder and life sentences were awarded to each of them; all the convicted were former members of the Janata Dal (later split into Janata Dal (United) and Rashtriya Janata Dal).

== Early life and education ==
Chandrashekhar Prasad was born on 20 September 1964 in Siwan, Bihar in a Kushwaha or Koeri family. His father was a sergeant in the Indian Air Force who died of a heart attack when he was 8 years old. His mother, Kaushalya Devi states that she only got ₹150 (equivalent to ₹5,800 or US$60 in 2023) as compensation for her husband's service to the forces but made sure her son was educated well. Chandrashekhar completed his intermediate education at Sainik School in Jhumri Tilaiya. Following his schooling, he was selected for National Defence Academy training in Pune. He joined the program but left it after 2 years, stating dissatisfaction. He subsequently enrolled in Patna University and became an active member of the All India Students Federation but became disillusioned with the federation some time afterwards. In 1990, he joined Jawaharlal Nehru University for a MPhil degree in English literature. He later started working on a PhD on Bihar's popular folk theater form Bidesia but was assassinated before he could complete it.

== Political activism ==
Chandrashekhar Prasad became associated with the Communist Party of India (Marxist–Leninist) Liberation during the formation of the All India Students Association. In an Aligarh town hall, he expressed his desire to bring a "revolution" for clean politics in India. He is credited with almost single-handedly building up the All India Students Association during his stay in Jawaharlal Nehru University. He was elected to the body of the Jawaharlal Nehru University Students' Union as the vice president for one term and president for two terms. He is said to have played a key role in creating the foundations of labourers, students, women's and dalits rights movements among the students community. After completing his M.Phil., he moved back to his hometown of Siwan to start a movement there.

Prasad was deputed as a youth leader of the Communist Party of India (Marxist–Leninist) Liberation in Siwan. He began campaigning against corruption and alleged criminal leaders of the region. He is described to have made considerable inroads as a mass leader and posed a threat to the Janata Dal (later split into Janata Dal (United) and Rashtriya Janata Dal), the ruling party in Bihar. After his death, Brij Bihari Pandey stated that Mohammad Shahabuddin, the Member of Parliament from the Siwan constituency was threatened by the activism of Chandrashekhar who was considered as a candidate from the constituency in the upcoming elections.

== Assassination ==
Prasad was addressing a corner meeting on J.P Road in Siwan, Bihar on 31 March 1997 for organising a bandh (general strike) in Bihar to protest against the mass murders and scandals that were rampant in the state. During the meeting, he was killed in a mass shooting along with another activist, Shyam Narayan Yadav and a hawker Bhutele Miyan. Mohammad Shahabuddin, who was a member of parliament and known as a strongman in the district, was the prime accused for the shooting along with 5 other members of the Janata Dal (later split into Janata Dal (United) and Rashtriya Janata Dal).

=== Student protests ===
Following the Chandrashekhar's assassination, there were "unprecedented protests" by students across India. In Delhi, students from the Jawaharlal Nehru University marched to the Bihar Niwas demanding a dialogue with the then Chief Minister of Bihar, Lalu Prasad Yadav. In response, Sadhu Yadav, a leader of the Rashtriya Janata Dal had allegedly ordered a mass shooting on the student protesters by the police. The protests occurred in various university campuses across major institutions such as Banaras Hindu University, Jadavpur University, Jamia Millia Islamia, Jawaharlal Nehru University and University of Lucknow among others; led by Kaushalya Devi, the mother of Chandrashekhar. Devi had been offered monetary compensation by the Government of Bihar which she had refused. The All India Students Association also demanded the arrest of Sadhu Yadav and capital punishment for Mohammad Shahabuddin. The student protests were able to pressurise Lalu Prasad Yadav into allowing the Central Bureau of Investigation to investigate the case. The term goonda raj to refer to the criminalisation of politics in Bihar was coined during these protests.

=== Investigation and trial ===
On 26 February 2012, following the investigation by the Central Bureau of Investigation, a special court convicted 3 of the accused, sentenced them to life imprisonment and fined each of them a sum of ₹40,000 (equivalent to ₹75,000 or US$780 in 2023). The general secretary Dipankar Bhattacharya however expressed dissatisfaction with the verdict and stated that the verdict was "disappointing inadequate" and that the courts had skirted the "political character of the murder" by ignoring the charges on Mohammad Shahabuddin, the prime accused in the case. On 23 March 2012, a fourth accused was sentenced for life whose trial had run separately and a fifth accused had died during the course of the trials, therefore, no convictions were brought against him. Following the trials, the Communist Party of India (Marxist–Leninist) Liberation states that the CBI treated the crime like a case of random shooting instead of a political assassination. The party maintains the position that no justice was granted with the verdict where a young activist was killed by a sitting member of Parliament and only his hitmen were sentenced.

== Recognition ==
In 2010, filmmaker Mahesh Bhatt initiated a project to create a biopic of Chandrashekhar Prasad titled Chandu. The announcement invoked controversy against any perceived sense of distortions of facts on the contemporary figure. The project however stated that the film will not indulge in any distortion of facts for commercial gains and will be produced as a documentary film. The documentary film maker Ajay Kanchan was employed as director. The actor Imran Zahid was cast to play the role of Chandrashekhar "Chandu" Prasad. In 2013, the project was scrapped due to opposition to its production and concerns of potential legal hurdles as a result of the cases related to the assassination being sub judice at the time. The project was revived in 2016 and is currently under production as a non-commercial documentary.

In 2017, a memorial statue of Chandrashekhar Prasad was installed in Gopalganj More Chowk (which has been renamed Chandrashekhar Chowk) in Siwan, Bihar. Kaushalya Devi, the mother of Chandrashekhar, has also donated a piece of land near the memorial to the Communist Party of India (Marxist–Leninist) Liberation for the construction of a school and a library in her son's memory.

== See also ==
- List of unsolved murders (1980–1999)
