= List of colleges affiliated to the Panjab University =

Following is a list of colleges affiliated to the Panjab University in Chandigarh, India. Panjab University is a collegiate public university established in 1947 and tracing its origins to the University of the Punjab in Lahore, which was founded in 1882. It has 188 affiliated colleges spread over the state of Punjab and the union-territory of Chandigarh.

== List ==
List of colleges affiliated to Panjab University, sorted by district:

=== Abohar ===
- Bhag Singh Hayer Khalsa College for Women
- DAV College
- DAV College of Education
- Gopichand Arya Mahila College
- Guru Nanak Khalsa College
- Jyoti B.Ed. College
- Kenway College of Education
- Maharishi Dayanand College of Education
- Waheguru College

=== Barnala ===
- Sanatan Dharam College – S.D. College

=== Chandigarh ===
- Brahmrishi Yoga Training College
- Chandigarh College of Architecture – CCA
- Chandigarh College of Engineering and Technology – CCET
- DAV College
- Dev Samaj College for Women
- Dev Samaj College of Education
- Goswami Ganesh Dutta Sanatan Dharma College – GGDSD
- Government College of Art
- Government College of Commerce and Business Administration – GCCBA
- Government College of Education
- Government College of Yoga Education and Health
- Government Home Science College
- Government Medical College and Hospital – GMCH
- Guru Gobind Singh College for Women
- Homoeopathic Medical College and Hospital
- Homoeopathic Medical College and Hospital
- Mehr Chand Mahajan Dayanand Anglo Vedic College for Women – MCM DAV College
- National Institute of Nursing Education – NINE
- Post Graduate Government College, Sector 11
- Post Graduate Government College, Sector 46
- Post Graduate Government College for Girls, Sector 11
- Post Graduate Government College for Girls, Sector 42
- Regional Institute of English – RIE
- Shri Dhanwantry Ayurvedic College and Hospital
- Shri Guru Gobind Singh College, Sector 26

=== Firozpur ===
- Babe Ke College of Education
- DAV College for Women
- Dev Samaj College for Women
- GGS DAV Centenary College
- Government College
- Guru Ram Dass B.Ed. College
- M.R. Government College
- RSD College
- Surjeet Memorial College of Education

=== Mansa ===
- Nehru Memorial Government College

=== Hoshiarpur ===
- Babbar Akali Memorial Khalsa College – BAM
- Dashmesh Girls College
- DAV College
- DAV College for Girls
- DAV College of Education
- Giani Kartar Singh Memorial Government College
- Goswami Guru Dutt Sanatan Dharam College – GGDSD
- Government College – Hoshiarpur
- Guru Nanak College of Education
- Guru Nanak Khalsa College for Women
- Guru Teg Bahadur Khalsa College
- Jagdish Chandra DAV College
- Khalsa College
- Maharaj Brahmanand Bhuriwale Garib Dassi *Rana Gajinder Chand B.Ed. Girls College
- Rayat Bahra College of Education
- S.D. College
- Saini Bar College
- Sant Baba Hari Singh Memorial Khalsa College of Education
- Sant Majha Singh Karamjot College for Women – SMSKC
- SGGS Khalsa College
- Siri Guru Har Rai Sahib College for Women
- Sri Guru Gobind Singh College of Education
- Swami Premanand Mahavidyalaya

=== Khanna ===
- Anglo Sanskrit College for Women
- AS College
- AS College for Women
- AS College of Education
- Gobindgarh Public College

=== Ludhiana ===
- Arya College
- Baba Kundan Rural College of Education
- Bahadur Chand Munjal College of Education – BCM
- Bhai Nagahia Singh Memorial Girls College
- Bhutta College of Education
- DD Jain College of Education
- Devki Devi Jain Memorial College for Women
- Doraha College of Education for Women
- GHG Harprakash College for Women
- GHG Khalsa College of Education
- Gobindgarh College of Education
- Government College for Women
- GTB National College
- Guru Gobind Singh Khalsa College for Women
- Guru Gobind Singh Khalsa College of Education for Women
- Guru Nanak College of Education
- Guru Nanak College of Law
- Guru Nanak Girls College
- Guru Nanak Khalsa College for Women
- G.G.N.KHALSA COLLEGE, CIVIL LINES, LUDHIANA
- Guru Nanak National College
- Kamla Lohtia Sanatan Dharam College
- Khalsa College for Women
- Lajpat Rai DAV College
- Mai Bhago College for Women
- Malwa Central College of Education for Women
- Malwa College Bondli Samrala
- Mata Ganga Khalsa College for Girls
- Mata Gurdev Kaur Memorial Shahi Sports *College of Physical Education
- Partap College of Education
- Ramgarhia Girls College
- Sadbhavna College of Education for Women
- Satish Chandra Dhawan Government College
- SCD Government College
- SDP College for Women
- Shree Atam Vallabh Jain College
- Shree Atam Vallabh Jain College Institute of Management and Technology Studies
- Sri Aurobindo College of Commerce and Management
- Swami Ganga Giri Janta Girls College
- University Business School – UBS

Malerkotla

- Kalgidhar Institute of Higher Education

=== Moga ===
- Arjan Dass College
- Baba Kundan Singh Memorial Law College
- Baba Mangal Singh Institute of Education
- DM College of Education
- Guru Nanak College
- Jagat Sewak Khalsa College for Women
- Lala Hans Raj Memorial College of Education
- Lala Lajpat Rai Memorial College of Education
- Moga College of Education for Girls
- Sant Baba Bhag Singh Memorial Girls College of Education
- Sant Darbara Singh College of Education for Women
- Satyam College of Education
- Shukdeva Krishna College of Education for Girls
- Tagore College of Education

=== Mohali ===
- Indo Global College of Education
- Lord Krishna College of Education for Girl

=== Muktsar ===
- Bawa Nihal Singh B.Ed. College
- Dasmesh Girls College of Education
- Guru Gobind Singh College of Education
- Guru Nanak College for Girls
- JD College of Education
- Maharaja Ranjit Singh College
- Saint Sahara College of Education
- Guru Nanak College Killianwali

=== Nawanshahr ===
- BKM College of Education

=== Patiala ===
- Asian Institution College of Professional Education
- Jagdish Chandra DAV College

=== Ropar ===
- Rayat College of Education
- Rayat College of Law
- Rayat College of Physical Education
- Shivalik Hills College of Education
