= Aishe Ghosh =

Indian student activist (born 1995)

- Ghosh in 2026

President of the Jawaharlal Nehru University Students' Union
- In office 2019–2020
- Preceded by: N Sai Balaji
- Succeeded by: Dhananjay

Personal details
- Born: 22 October 1995 (age 30) Durgapur, West Bengal, India
- Party: Communist Party of India (Marxist)
- Education: Delhi University (BA); Jawaharlal Nehru University (MA; Jawaharlal Nehru University (MPhil/PhD)
- Occupation: Student Activist
- Known for: JNUSU President

Aishe Ghosh is an Indian politician, student activist, and one of the prominent leaders of India's Gen-Z uprisings. She was the former President of the JNU Students' Union and a member of the SFI. As of 2026, she is pursuing MPhil/PhD at JNU. She was also the CPI(M) candidate for the 2021 West Bengal Legislative Assembly election.

== Early life and education ==
Born on 22 October 1995, Ghosh grew up in the city of Durgapur in the Paschim Bardhaman district of West Bengal. She is the older child of Debashish Ghosh and Sharmishta Ghosh. Her father Debashish Ghosh, an employee of Damodar Valley Corporation, has been associated with Centre for Indian Trade Unions (CITU), the labour wing of the Communist Party of India (Marxist), while her mother Sharmishta Ghosh is a housewife. She has a younger sister Ishika Ghosh, who is presently doing her BA from Shyama Prasad Mukherji College in New Delhi.

After graduating with a degree in political science from Delhi University's Daulat Ram College, Ghosh received a master's degree from JNU. She is currently pursuing a master of philosophy at the School of International Relations from JNU.

== Political career ==
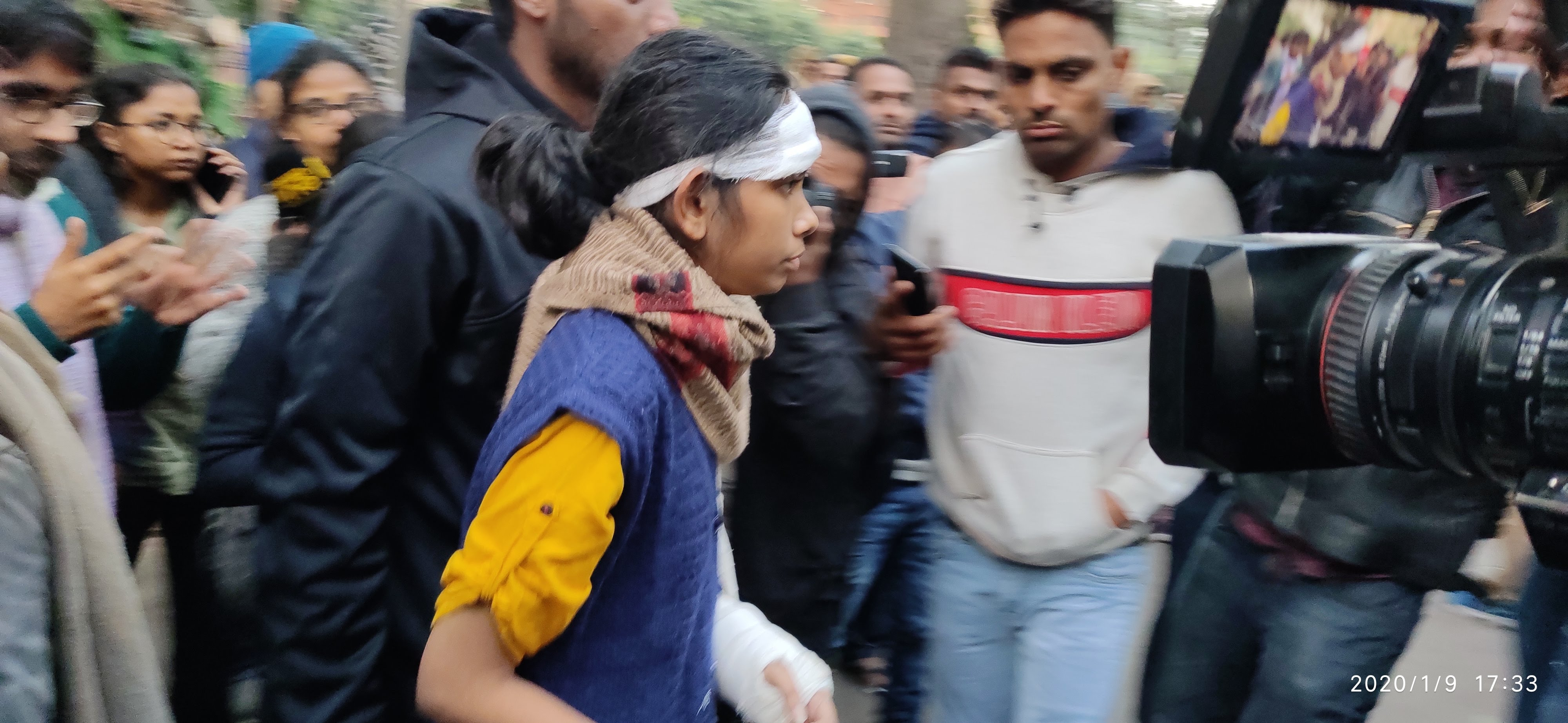
Aishe Ghosh, returning with fellow student protesters from a meeting with an MHRD official

In September 2019, Ghosh was elected president of the Jawaharlal Nehru University Students' Union. In that role, Ghosh became involved in protests against fee hikes, library funding cuts, hostel shortages, increased electricity charges and dress and time restrictions on university students. Following the introduction of new rules in October 2019, the university became the most expensive central university in India. She held the view that state universities should not act like for-profit institutions. Ghosh has also taken part in protests against the removal of the university's gender sensitization committee and impunity for Atul Johri, a professor accused of sexual harassment. She has been critical of the Bharatiya Janata Party for perceived neglect in supporting educational institutions and accused the party of attacking the university since it came to power.

On 5 January 2020, Ghosh was admitted to AIIMS Delhi hospital after suffering a head injury during the attack on the campus, allegedly perpetrated by the Akhil Bharatiya Vidyarthi Parishad, the largest student organization in India. The attack on the campus received widespread coverage following which she attained national recognition in middle of the growing protest movement in India.

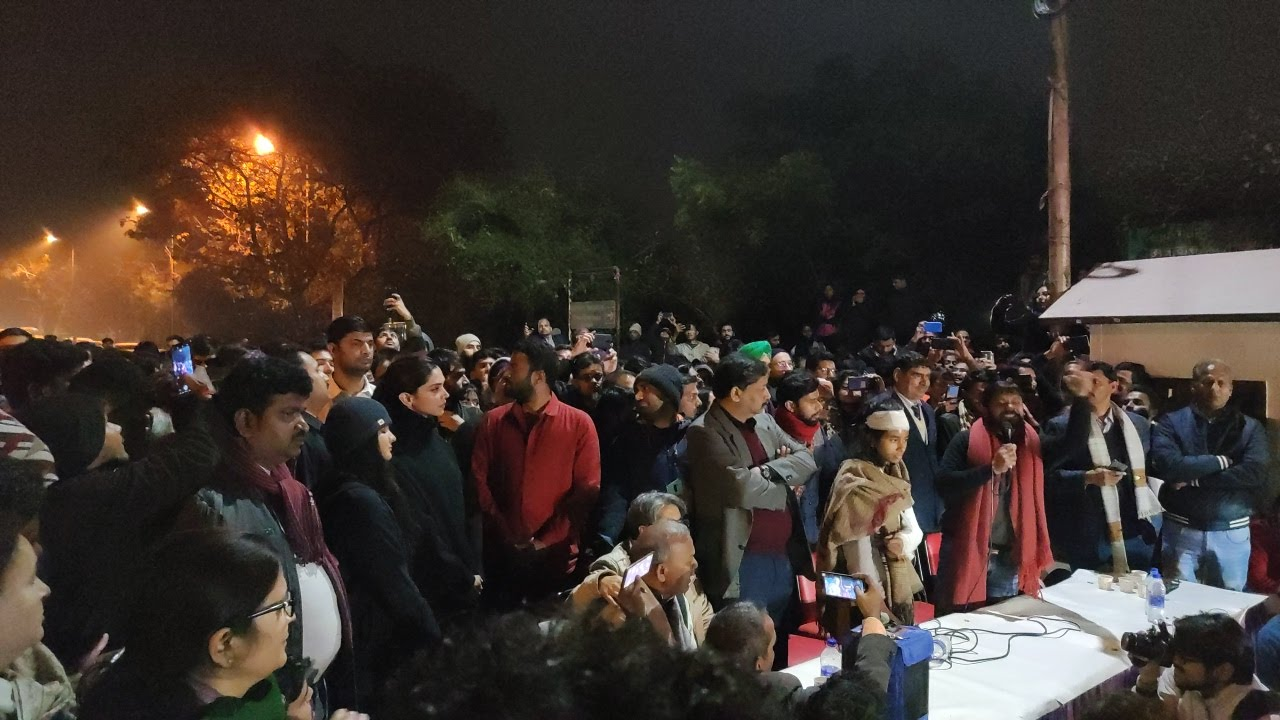
Deepika Padukone and Ghosh, at the 7 Jan 2020 public protest on the JNU campus against the 2020 Jawaharlal Nehru University attack

She received widespread support including from actress, Deepika Padukone and the Chief Minister of Kerala, Pinarayi Vijayan who personally came to meet her. The police charged Aishe Ghosh for vandalism and assault for the incident but no arrests were made. She later alleged that there was a nexus between the attackers, the police and the JNU administration with the intent of breaking up the movement. Following the incident, she took part in the nationwide protest movement against CAA and NRC.

She has also in the authority of the president of the JNUSU, filed a petition at the Delhi High Court against the "arbitrary" fee hikes and fines imposed by the university administration.

In February 2020, Ghosh was denied permission by two state-run universities in Kolkata to address meetings on campus. She was also denied permission by a district administration in West Bengal to hold a rally in West Burdwan.

She has served as the President of SFI Delhi. She was elected as the all-India joint-secretary of SFI in the 18th All India Conference of SFI.

== 2021 West Bengal Assembly Election ==
Aishe Ghosh was the CPI(M) candidate from Jamuria (Vidhan Sabha constituency) in 2021 West Bengal Election; Hareram Singh from All India Trinamool Congress won the seat, while Ghosh came in 3rd position behind BJP's Tapas Kumar Roy.
