= Khatima =

City in Uttarakhand, India

- City
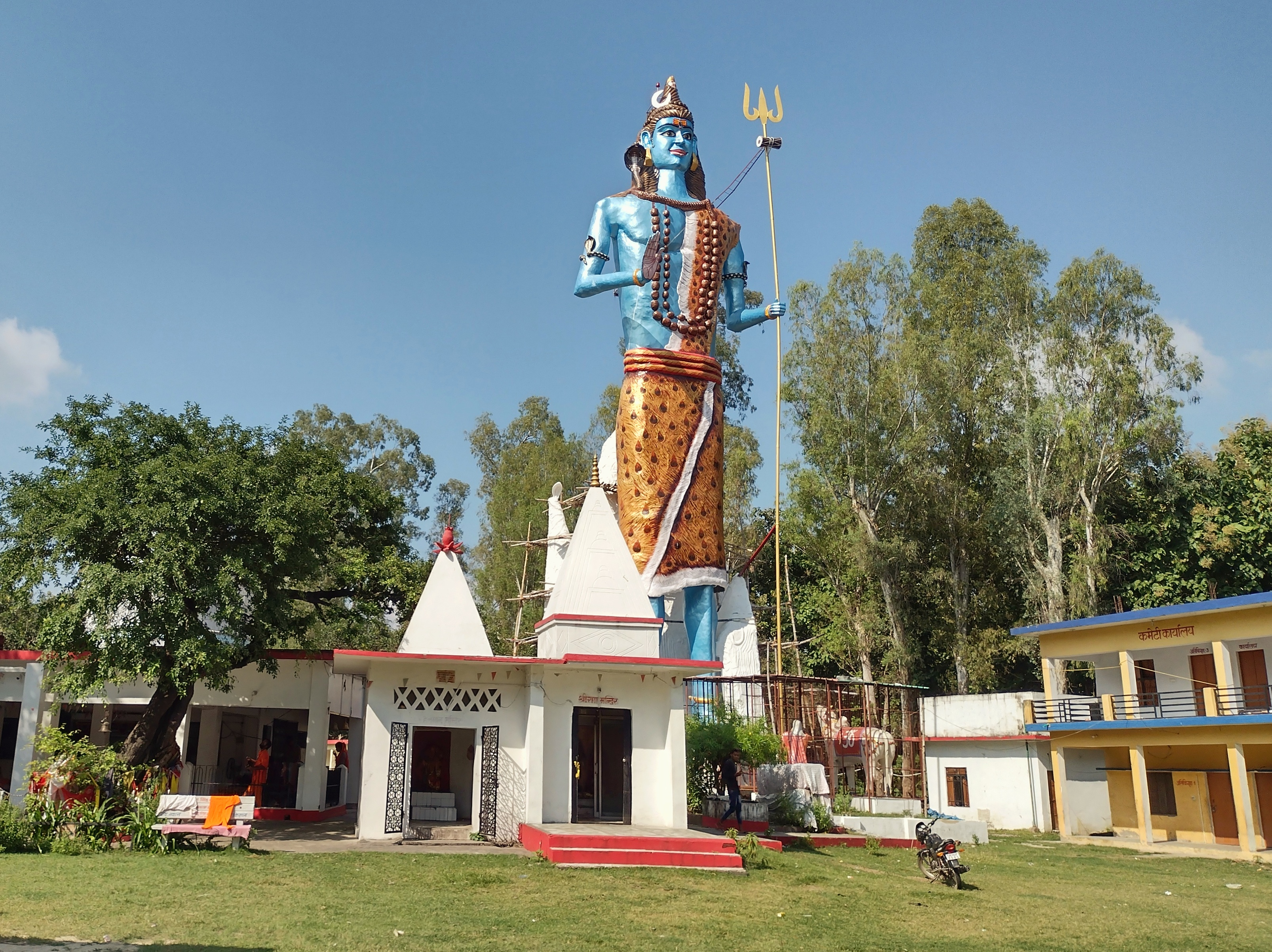
- Khatima

- Location in Uttarakhand, India Khatima (India)
- Coordinates: 28°55′11.4″N 79°58′11.8″E
- Country: India
- State: Uttarakhand
- District: Udham Singh Nagar

Government
  - Type: Municipal Council
  - Chairman: Ramesh Chandra Joshi (BJP)

Area
  - Total: 25 km^{2} (9.7 sq mi)

Population (2011)
  - Total: 227,226
  - Density: 9,100/km^{2} (24,000/sq mi)

Languages
  - Official: Hindi
  - Additional official: Sanskrit
  - Regional: Tharu
- Time zone: UTC+5:30 (IST)
- PIN: 262308
- Telephone code: 05943
- Vehicle registration: UK 06
- Website: uk.gov.in

Khatima is a city and a municipal board in Udham Singh Nagar district in the Indian state of Uttarakhand.

Khatima is located at 28.92°N 79.97°E. It has an average elevation of 299 metres (980 feet).

== Demographics ==
As of 2011 Indian Census, Khatima had a total population of 2,27,226 of which 1,15,366 were males and 1,11,860 were females. The population within the age group of 0 to 6 years was 28,274. The total number of literates in Khatima was 1,51,975 which constituted 66.88% of the population with male literacy of 74.1% and female literacy of 55.93%. The effective literacy rate of the 7+ population of Khatima was 83.2%, of which the male literacy rate was 88.8% and the female literacy rate was 76.7%. The Scheduled Castes and Scheduled Tribes population was 30,820 and 53,692 respectively. Khatima had 42,922 households in 2011.

The 2001 Indian census recorded the population of Khatima as 14,378, with males constituting 54% of the population and females 46%. The literacy rate was 66%, of which male literacy was 73%, and female literacy was 58%. 16% of the population was under 6 years of age.

== Notable people ==
- Pushkar Singh Dhami, 10th Chief Minister of Uttarakhand.
- Bhuwan Chandra Kapri, Member of the 5th Uttarakhand Assembly.
- Neha Bora, PhD student from JNU , national president of AISA
