= Students For Society =

Student organisation at Panjab University, Chandigarh, India

- ਸਮਾਜ ਲਈ ਵਿਦਿਆਰਥੀ
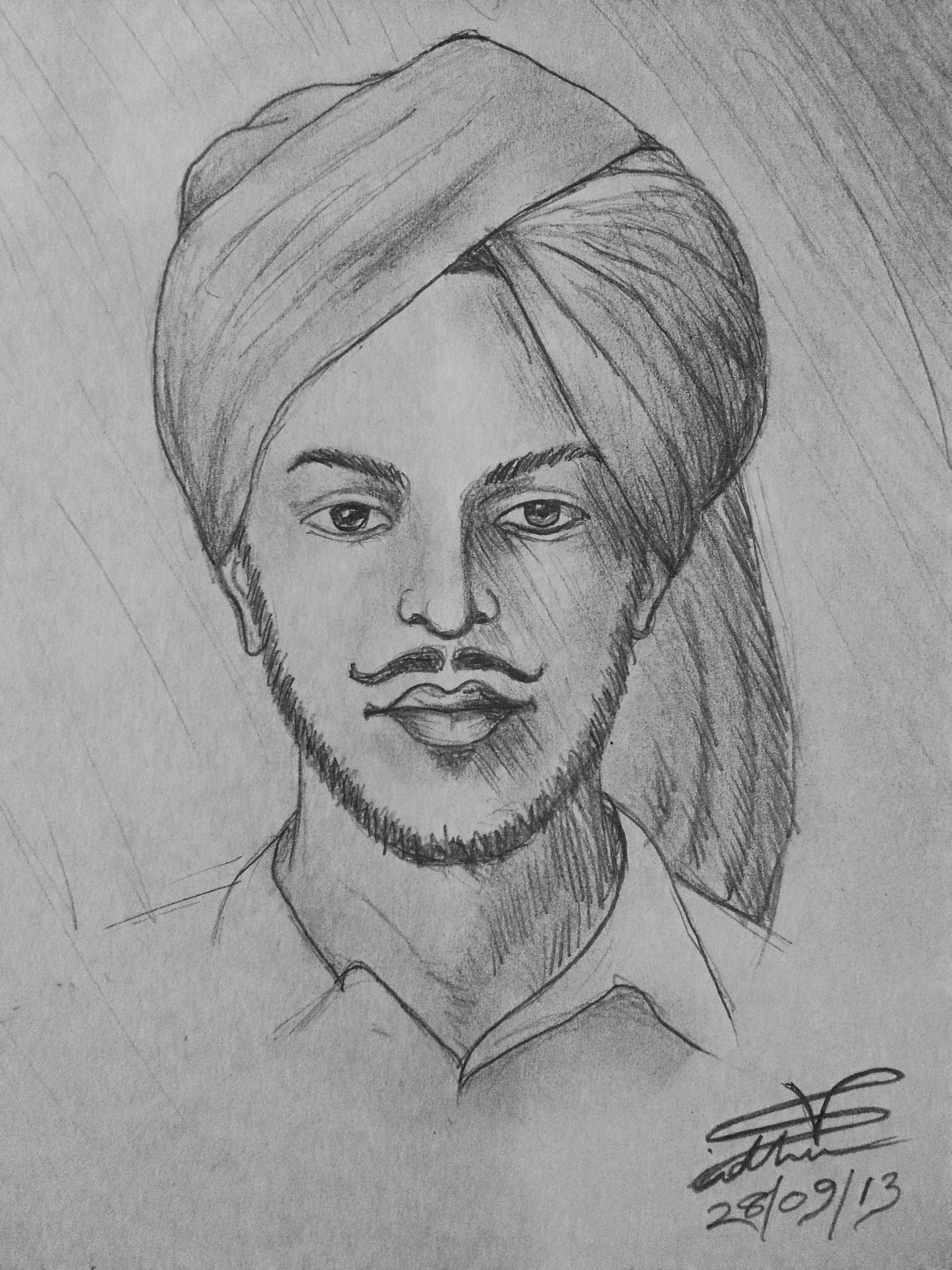
- SFS follows the Ideology of Shaheed Bhagat Singh
- Abbreviation: SFS
- Formation: 2010
- Founded at: Panjab University
- Location: Panjab University
- President: Sandeep
- Main organ: People’s Artist Forum
- Website: www.sfspu.blogspot.com https://www.instagram.com/studentsforsociety_sfs/

The Students For Society (SFS) was founded in Panjab University, Chandigarh on 28 September 2010 as a students' discussion group for holding discussions on books and social issues, on the 103rd birth anniversary of Bhagat Singh. It rejected the politics of muscle and money power by mainstream political parties in University. It also rejected the politics of those who were trying to get votes by offering movie shows, dinners, trips and beauty parlour coupons. SFS takes out its rallies on foot with singing of slogans with a Tambourine (Dafli) while other parties took out rallies in cars. Its rallies are joined by a considerable number of campus students while the SOI, PUSU and NSUI alliances had to call outsiders in violation of the Lyngdoh panel norms.

== About SFS ==
Largely leftist in its ideology, SFS was founded in 2010 by Sachinderpal Pali, Amrik Singh, Amandeep Singh, Amaninder Singh, Pardeep Singh and Sawinder Singh. Among the founders, Pali is the only one now who is actively involved in the organisation, which fought its first Panjab University Campus Students Council (PUCSC) election in 2014. The slogan of the organisation, according to spokesperson Harmandeep Singh, is "to mobilise youth to accomplish the new democratic revolution in India." Students For Society (SFS) is a student organization that envisions to work on the footsteps of Bhagat Singh. SFS strive to work together with all the democratic forces to create egalitarian society, where equality and freedom are not mere words to be written on pages of constitution but a material reality. SFS has always endeavored toward promoting academic culture and encouraging critical thinking be it through discussions, seminars or other cultural events. When the time demands so, SFS has raised its voice against each and every injustice done or regressive step taken by central or state government or university administration like issues of fee hikes, commercialization of education, funds cutting or deteriorating conditions of hostel and mess workers. Understanding student as part of society, and following the principle of students for society it has initiated a number of protest demonstration against women oppression, caste based oppression and other evils of society.

== Street plays ==
Street Plays are the unique identity of SFS' politics in campus. Every year they expose the cheap politics of other student outfits through its street plays. It is commonly seen that other student organisations spent several lakhs of money on campaigning, banners, stickers, discothèque parties, car rallies, trips to hill stations, free meals, flash mobs, online campaigns but SFS members organised street plays mocking these other outfits. One such play by SFS in 2016 was Melan vottan da which was a satirical take on the student elections. Again in 2018 like 2017 and 2016 SFS used its traditional street play "Mela Votan Da" as campaign tool. This time it was under the banner of "Melan Votan Da Returns". It is a play in the form of satire on all mainstream political parties' student wings. Shamefully in 2018 also university authorities didn't allow SFS to stage play on all the decided cites as they fear that SFS gains good ground in elections on the basis of their play. Harman Deep, SFS leader, said: "Like other parties, we do not have resources to take students out for movies or discotheques. The mode of street plays not only entertains, but communicates what we perceive has been happening in the polls. It has been an effective strategy."

== PUCSC elections ==
It was in 2014, when for the first time SFS fielded its candidate for the Presidential Post in Panjab University Campus Students Council PUCSC and got unexceptionally good number of votes. In 2015 SFS did not fought elections as it was alleged by some organisations that the ongoing Girls protest which was ked by SFS in 2015 is only to gain political mileage. So SFS through GBM (General Body Meeting) decided to boycott elections. In 2016 Panjab University Campus Students Council elections, SFS gave an impressive performance with its presidential candidate Amritpal Singh coming on third position with 2494 votes. It was however a close contest between PUSU and Students For Society (SFS) for the president's post. SOI was continuously on the third position but after the counting of votes of University Institute of Information and Technology (UIET) department that SOI presidential candidate secured the second position. In 2017 SFS panel had one girl in the field, named Hasanpreet Kaur for the presidential election. Hasanpreet is from the Physics Department. Shiv Saurav for Vice President, UIET, Ranjit Singh for General Secretary, Punjabi Department, And for the post of Joint Secretary, Karan Goyal, UILS landed in the field. In 2018 PUCSC elections, SFS's Kanupriya, a second year student of M.Sc. Zoology from Patti, Punjab was elected first women president in the history of Panjab University. 22 years old Kanupriya, demanded freedom for girls keeping girls' hostels open for 24 hours and attacked ideology of RSS. SFS won more than 50 percent votes in 11 departments. In 2019 PUCSC elections SFS following its last year election setup again fielded only one candidate for the post of President. In year 2019, Scholar from Chemistry department, Priya fought election for President from the platform of SFS. She secured third position trailing behind SOI candidate Chetan Choudhary by approx. 500 votes and ABVP candidate Paras Rattan by 50 votes.

== Candidates for PUCSC Elections ==
President	Vice President	General Secretary	Joint Secretary	Year
Priya	-	-	-	2019
Kanupriya	-	-	-	2018
Hassanpreet	Shiv Sourav	Ranjit Singh	Karan Goyal	2017
Amritpal	-	-	-	2016
Aman	-	-	-	2014

== Activities ==
SFS endeavours toward promoting democratic academic culture inside the campus. It aims to fight on all students' issues uncompromisingly. Since 2012, SFS organized fee hike protests and raised voice against sexual harassment on the campus, unhygienic diet in the hostels and for banning of four-wheelers inside campus making the PU a vehicle-free zone and organised a number of seminars and discussions inside the campus premises. In February 2017, the SFS also organised protest at campus on an incident of rape of 16 Scheduled Tribe (Adivasi) women in Chhattisgarh which was retailited by ABVP members of University. In 2017 Fee hike protests 40 SFS-affiliated students were arrested to which it said there is a 'deliberate attempt' being made to restrict the voice of students in universities.

Major events and Activities of SFS includes:

- Continuously Day and Night protest was led by SFS regarding Girls’ Hostel Timing for 24*7. After 48 days struggle students were successful in breaking hostel locks.
- SFS demanded for Referendum on four wheeler inside campus to boost up academic culture in 2015 which was in resulted in majority voting for ban of four wheelers inside campus.
- Lecture cum Interactive session on Black Laws and PCOCA by R.S. Bains was organized by SFS.
- Protest to make PUCASH effective was led by SFS.
- SFS celebrates International Women's Day Every year as a cultural program.

== 11 April 2017 episode ==
After Panjab University announced up to 1100% fee hike in different courses, SFS immediately gave the call to protest against such a massive fee hike and a 40 days long struggle was led by SFS and with the unity of students they won the struggle. It was on 11 April 2017, when call was given to gather in front of VC office and boycott classes. Huge gathering of students was present there by 11 in the morning. After some heated arguments with police and authorities, there was aggressive attack on students by police men. Water cannon and Lathis were used to disperse the gathering. Finally students retaliated. There was continuous stone pelting done by the students toward police men. Then the more aggressive police used tear gas and other modes against the students. 67 students were arrested and charged with sedition for protesting against MHRD and PU, which was dropped later on. That day was on the most glorious day of students' struggle. Finally on 7 May that year fee hike was rolled back.

== Seema Azad episode ==
In March 2017, SFS was objected by PU authorities and RSS student wing, Akhil Bharatiya Vidyarthi Parishad (ABVP), when it brought activist Seema Azad to the campus. It was a planned event, Second Conference of SFS in the university the permission for which was rejected by university authorities on the behest of MP from Chandigarh and some student organisations. SFS objected to that and took out their conference outside VC office. Where, Azad was dressed as a Sikh woman, addressed the students on the topic 'Rise of fascism'. The ABVP had maintained that it would oppose her with swords and sticks.

== Controversies ==
SFS is a subject of discussion among university students and others regarding its approach to the establishment and its arguments concerning government policies. The organization has also been involved in controversies, such as appearing with Pro-Khalistani groups or issues regarding religious sentiments. In response to these controversies, the organization has defended its positions through its methods of argument.

== See also ==
- Panjab University Campus Students Council
