= University Institute of Applied Management Sciences =

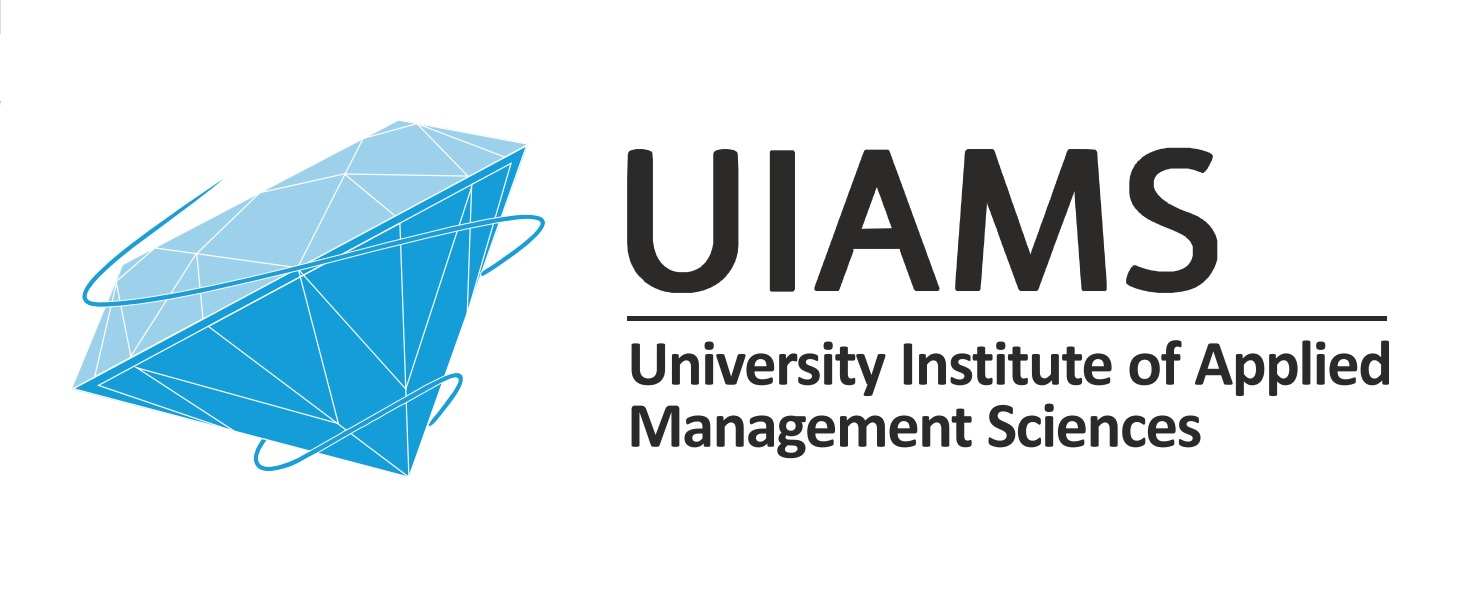
- Motto: To create an excellence
- Type: Public business school
- Established: 2008; 18 years ago
- Affiliations: Panjab University
- Director: Anupreet Kaur Mavi
- Students: 336
- Location: Sector 25, Chandigarh, India
- Campus: Urban
- Nickname: UIAMS
- Website: uiams.puchd.ac.in

University Institute of Applied Management Sciences (UIAMS) is an Indian business school that comes under the aegis of the Panjab University, Chandigarh. It is one of the business schools in India which started offering sectoral MBA programmes supplemented with specialization in core functional areas of management.

It was established in 2008 and one of the top MBA college in the city of Chandigarh. UIAMS offers management education to professional managers as specialized full-time MBA programmes.

== History ==
The business school was established in 2008. In 2009 and 2017, MBA students of UIAMS department were elected president of Panjab University Campus Students Council.

== Courses ==
UIAMS offers the following courses. MBA sectoral at UIAMS is a two year course. Sectoral MBA programmes are supplemented with specialization in core functional areas of management including Marketing, Finance, Human Resources and Operations.

- MBA (Banking and Insurance)
- MBA (Hospital Management)
- MBA (Infrastructural Management)
- MBA (Pharmaceutical Management)
- MBA (Retail Management)
- MBA (IT & Telecommunications)
- MBA (Capital Market)
- PHD

== Student life and participation ==
Student life at UIAMS is full of activities that stretch beyond the classroom as it involves various student's activities. As a full Time MBA student at UIAMS, students get an opportunity to join the different student run bodies E-Cell, PR cell, UIAMS Management Club etc., which coordinates several activities on campus.

UIAMS has academic exchange programme with Nottingham Trent University, UK.

UIAMS annually organizes three day Management cum Academic fest known as PRAZNIK and quiz event at university campus. SAMYUKT is the annual alumni meet event at UIAMS. There are regular Seminars, interactive sessions, expert talks by eminent personalities are conducted on campus.

Each academic session is started with an orientation programme where successful entrepreneurs and business leaders share their success mantras with freshers.
