= Student Organisation of India =

Indian student organization

Student Organization of India
- President: Ranbir Singh Dhillon Rana
- Founded: 2009
- Headquarters: Punjab, India
- Mother party: Shiromani Akali Dal
- Website: youthakalidal.com

Student Organization of India (SOI) is the student division of the Shiromani Akali Dal (SAD) party in India. The organization is a part of Panjab University, Chandigarh.

== History ==
In 2015, SOI Alliance won all four seats in the Panjab University Campus Students Council. SOI made a debut in Delhi University student elections in 2015. SOI contested 18 seats in three colleges under DU and was able to win 10.

SOI candidates won all six seats student union seats at Sri Guru Gobind Singh College of Commerce, Pitam Pura, with Mandeep Singh GGS as president, Agamjeet Singh Malhotra as vice-president, Deepakshi Garg as joint secretary, and Tavleen Kaur as general secretary. Pavneet Kaur and Amanpal Singh are central counselors. Manjot Singh was elected as the president and Ishmeet Singh Vicky of SOI was elected vice-president in Sri Guru Nanak Dev Khalsa College, Karol Bagh. Also, at Sri Guru Teg Bahadur Khalsa College (North Campus), SOI's Naresh Rohilla was elected president, with Rajni Arora and Himanshu Sharma as joint secretaries. The SOI Delhi State President is Mandeep Singh GGS. Also, Harkirat Singh Brar from IETVE is the Senior President at Panjab University.

== See also ==
- Akhil Bharatiya Vidyarthi Parishad
- Shiromani Akali Dal
- All India Sikh Students Federation
