= Pradeep Bhandari =

Indian Journalist

National Spokesperson Bharatiya Janata Party
- Incumbent
- Assumed office 23 July 2024

Personal details
- Born: Indore, Madhya Pradesh, India
- Party: Bharatiya Janata Party
- Education: Daly College Manipal Institute of Technology
- Occupation: Journalist; News Anchor; Politician; Psephologist

Pradeep Bhandari is an Indian politician from the BJP, a journalist, news anchor and psephologist, He was the news director of India News channel of ITV Network. Earlier, he worked as the consulting editor of Republic Bharat TV. He is the founder and editor-in-chief of Jan Ki Baat, a digital media platform. On 10 March, 2024 Bhandari joined as consulting editor for Zee News.

He is currently serving as the National Spokesperson of the Bharatiya Janata Party.

== Education ==
He completed his high school in Indore's Daly College then pursued a bachelor's degree in Electronics and Communication Engineering, from Manipal Institute of Technology in 2012.

== Career ==
In August 2022, he was appointed as the news director of India News, a Hindi news channel under the ITV Network. He founded Jan Ki Baat, a digital media company known for predicting elections through opinion and exit polls. He has made predictions for over 39 Indian elections.

On India news, Pradeep Bhandari hosts a prime-time show called "Janta Ka Mukadama," which airs 60 minutes a day, at 8 pm weekdays.

He gained prominence in 2020 for his reporting on the Sushant Singh Rajput's death case and was noted for his unusual reporting style.

Bhandari worked as the consulting editor at Republic Media Network, before resigning in February 2021. He hosted a popular show, "Lalkaar," on Republic TV. Later, Bhandari joined Zee News as consulting editor. He resigned from Zee amid rumours of a ban on his live coverage of PM Modi, Yogi Adityanath and HM Amit Shah.

He has also taught at Pink Flower Public School and served as the Youth Wing Co-ordinator of the Thalassemia and Child Welfare Group NGO.

In July 2024, BJP national president J.P. Nadda appointed Bhandari as a national spokesperson of the party.

== Controversies ==
In September 2020, Bhandari then worked as a consulting editor with Republic TV, was attacked by journalists associated with NDTV and ABP News outside the Narcotics Control Bureau office in Mumbai during coverage of the drug probe involving Deepika Padukone, Sara Ali Khan and Rakul Preet Singh. A video of the attack went viral on social media in which Pradeep Bhandari was seen being pushed by a man who also attempted to slap him. The incident took place in front of a Mumbai Police team who were trying to intervene. The cause of the confrontation remains unclear as per the report of Indian Express. However, according to Newslaundry, the altercation began after Bhandari made remarks towards other journalists and stepped into another journalist's camera frame. In a post on X, Bhandari described the journalists who attacked him as "goons" and said that they were "frustrated" with his coverage of the drug case being investigated by the NCB.

In October 2020, Bhandari was named in a civil suit filed in the Delhi High Court by 38 production houses and film bodies. The suit alleged that Bhandari, along with Arnab Goswami and other journalists from Republic TV and Times Now, made "derogatory" remarks against the Hindi film industry.

In October 2020, Republic TV reported its editor Pradeep Bhandari, was illegally detained by the Mumbai Police at the Khar Police Station despite being granted anticipatory bail by a Mumbai session court. Mumbai Police sources denied the allegation and stated that Bhandari was only being questioned in connection with a complaint filed against him for disobedience to an order by a public servant, assault or criminal force to deter a public servant from carrying out his duty and violating the Bombay Police Act.

In February 2023, the Indian National Congress's Tripura in-charge Ajoy Kumar filed a police complaint against Pradeep Bhandari, for predicting a victory for the Bharatiya Janata Party, accusing him of violating the Model Code of Conduct.

== Reception ==
In October 2021, an article published on Newslaundry, written by Akhauri Avtans Chitransh criticized the reporting style of Pradeep Bhandari. The article claimed that he uses colloquial language and profanity in his reporting on television. According to another source cited by Newslaundry, Bhandari's reporting style has been characterized as "provocative".

== Bibliography ==
- Bhandari, Pradeep (1 March 2020). Modi Mandate 2019: Dispatches from Ground Zero. Rupa Publications. p. 224. ISBN 9789353339975.
- ———————— (19 April 2024). Modi 3.0: Bigger, Higher, Stronger. Om Books International. p. 216. ISBN 9788119750320.
