= Panjab University =

Public university in Chandigarh, India

Coordinates: 30.757995°N 76.768209°E

- Seal of Panjab University
- Former name: East Punjab University (1947–1950)
- Motto: Tamasō mā jyotirgamaya
- Motto in English: "Lead us into the Light from Darkness"
- Type: Public
- Established: 14 October 1882; 144 years ago (as University of the Punjab) (Note: Although the senate of the university in 1947 had voted to divide the university between the two countries, the university was never officially partitioned. The Panjab University in Chandigarh nevertheless traces its origins to the university in Lahore.); 1 October 1947; 79 years ago (as Panjab University)
- Accreditation: NAAC
- Academic affiliations: UGC; NMC; NDC; AIU; ACU; IAU
- Budget: ₹868.46 crore (US$93 million) (2025-26)
- Chancellor: Vice President of India
- Vice-Chancellor: Dr. Tankeshwar Kumar
- Faculty: 971
- Undergraduates: 9,956
- Postgraduates: 6,047
- Doctoral students: 2,854
- Location: Sector 14 and Sector 25, Chandigarh, India
- Campus: 220 ha (550 acres); Urban
- Colours
- Website: puchd.ac.in

Panjab University (PU) is a collegiate public state university located in Chandigarh, India. Funded through both State and Union governments, it is considered a state university. It traces its origins to the University of the Punjab in Shimla and Lahore, which was founded in 1882. After the partition of India, the university was established on 1 October 1947, and called East Punjab University. Initially headquartered at a cantonment in Solan with teaching departments scattered across northern India, it later relocated to a newly built self-contained campus in sector 14, Chandigarh, and was renamed Panjab University. It is accredited by NAAC A++ grade. It is considered the No. 1 university in Punjab and Haryana.

The university has 78 teaching and research departments and 10 centres/chairs for teaching and research at the main campus located at Chandigarh. It has 201 affiliated colleges spread over the eight districts of Punjab state and union-territory of Chandigarh, with Regional Centres at Sri Muktsar Sahib, Ludhiana and Hoshiarpur. It is one of the well-ranked universities in India.

The campus is residential, spread over 220 hectares (550 acres) in sectors 14 and 25 of the city of Chandigarh. The main administrative and academic buildings are located in sector 14, beside a health centre, a sports complex, hostels and residential housing.

== History ==
The University of the Punjab was established on 14 October 1882 at Lahore (now in Punjab, Pakistan). The fate of the university after the partition of India in 1947, was deliberated at the Punjab Partition Committee, with representatives from East Punjab advocating for a division of the university. The senate of the university voted to split the university, and the matter reached the Partition Council at the centre, but a decision could not be made. With no university for the colleges in its territory, the government in East Punjab was compelled to bring an ordinance to set up a new university on 27 September 1947. The new university was then established in Solan (Shimla) of the Indian Punjab as the "East Punjab University" on 1 October 1947. After 1947, the university had no campus of its own for nearly a decade. The administrative office was in Solan and the teaching departments functioned from Hoshiarpur, Jalandhar, Delhi, and Amritsar. The name was later shortened to Panjab University in 1950.

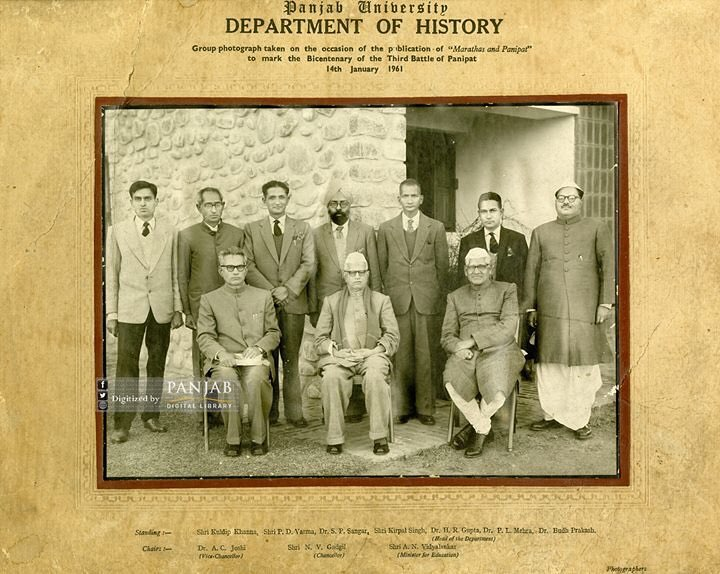
Historic photo of the Panjab University's History Department, 1961. Digitized by Panjab Digital Library.

In 1956 the university was relocated to Chandigarh, on a red sandstone campus designed by Pierre Jeanneret under the guidance of Le Corbusier. Until the re-organisation of Punjab in 1966, the university had its regional centres at Rohtak, Shimla, Jalandhar and its affiliated colleges were in the present-day states of Punjab, Haryana and Himachal Pradesh. With the re-organisation of Punjab, the university became an Inter-State Body Corporate catering to the newly organised state of Punjab and the union-territory of Chandigarh.

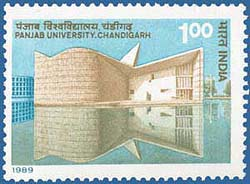
Panjab University featured on a 1989 stamp of India.

In April 2024, Panjab University in Chandigarh became one of the first universities in India to grant menstrual leave to female students, starting from the session 2024-25. The policy will allow leave of one day per one calendar month of teaching and maximum of four days leave per semester.

== Campus ==
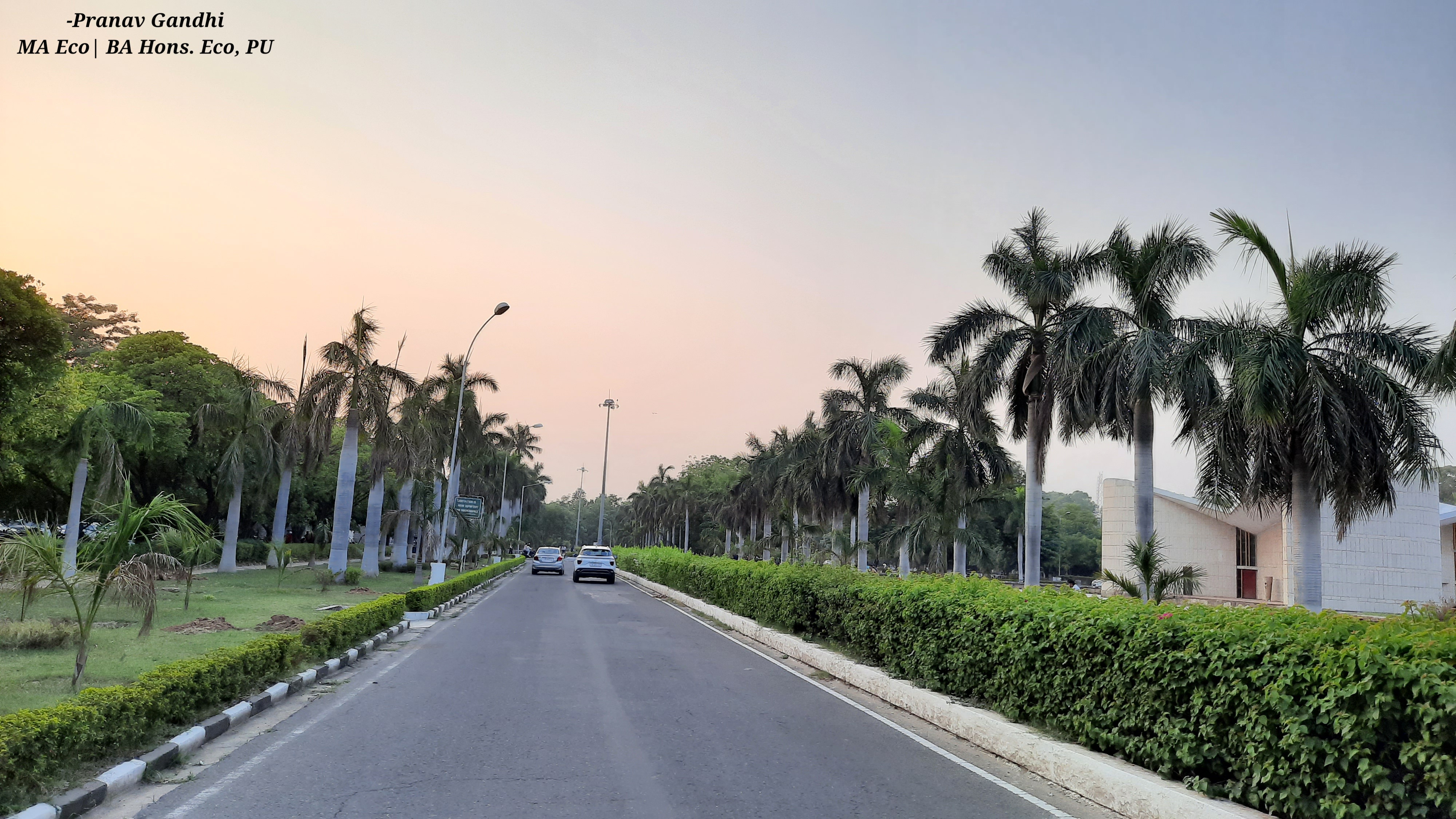
Panjab University Campus

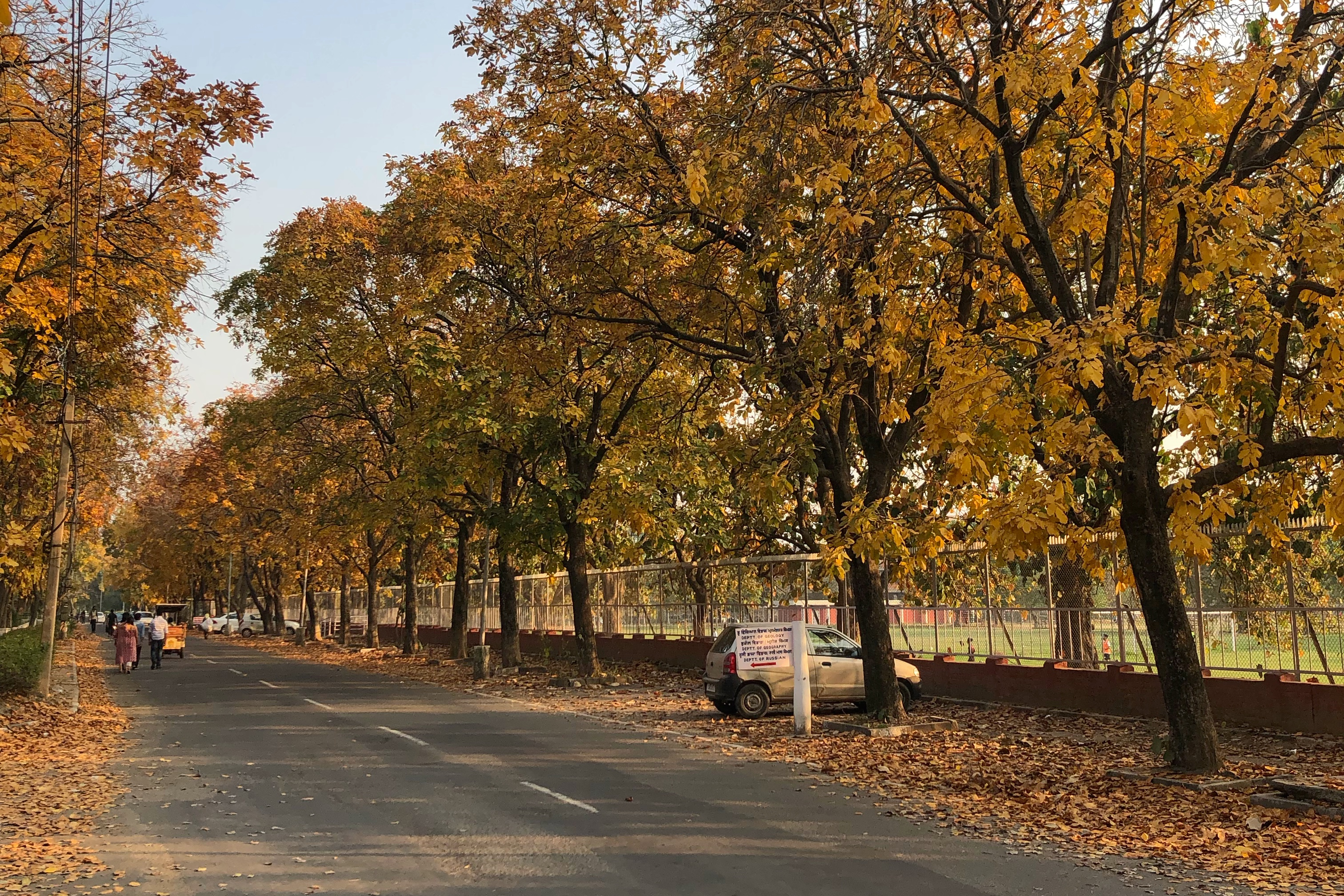
A road in Panjab University during spring.

The university's chequerboard layout was devised by Swiss-French Architect Pierre Jeanneret. The main campus at Chandigarh is spread over 220 hectares (550 acres) in Sectors 14 and 25, the teaching area is in the north-east, with the Central Library, Fine Arts Museum, and three-winged structure of the Gandhi Bhawan forming its core; the sports complex, the health centre, the dolphinarium, student centre and the shopping centre in the middle; 16 university hostels and residential area in the south-east, stretching into the adjacent Sector 25 which also houses the University Institute of Engineering and Technology, Dr. Harvansh Singh Judge Institute of Dental Sciences and Hospital, UIAMS, and Institute of Biological Sciences. The campus in Sector 25 is also known as the south campus.

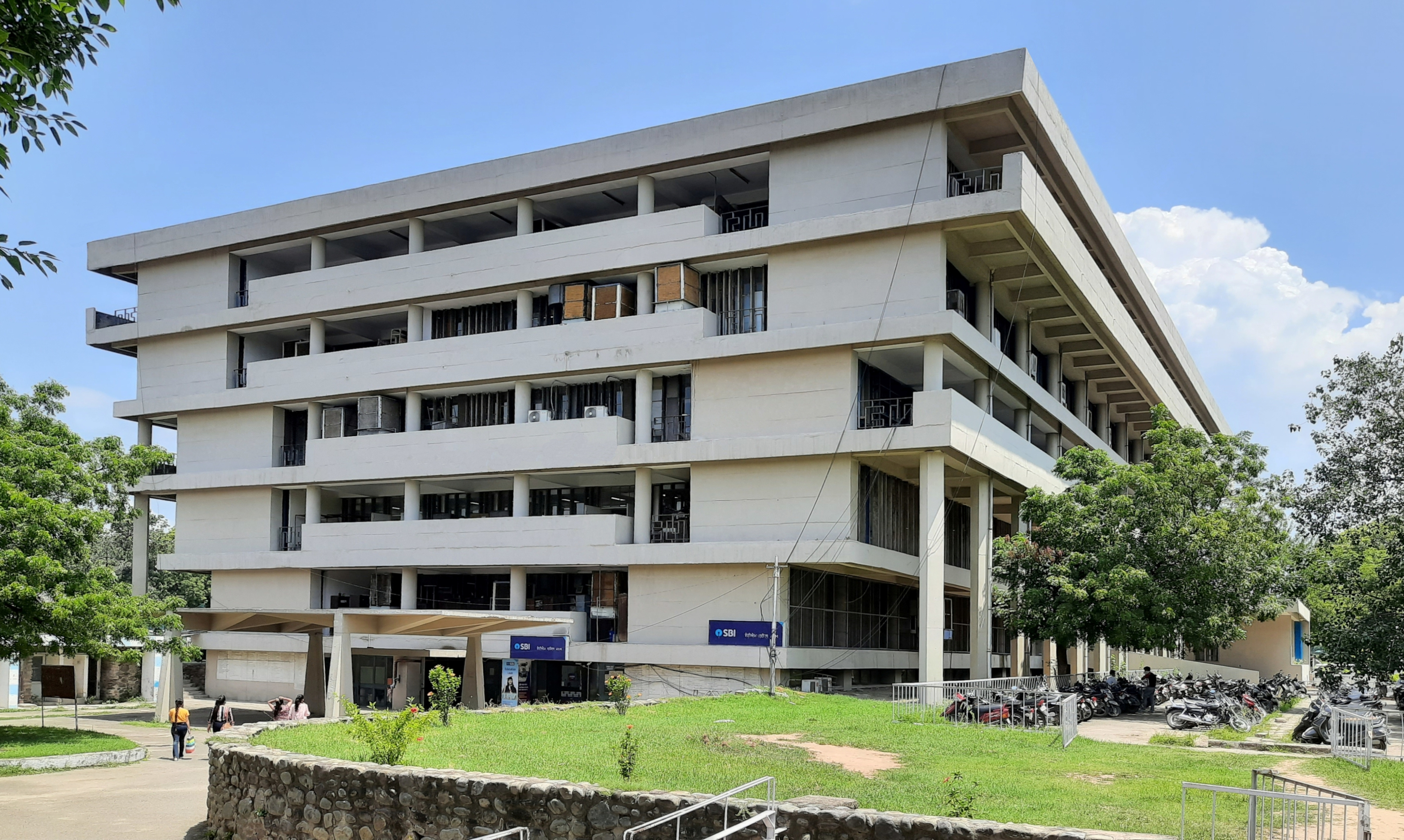
Administrative building, Panjab University, Chandigarh.

=== Halls of residence ===
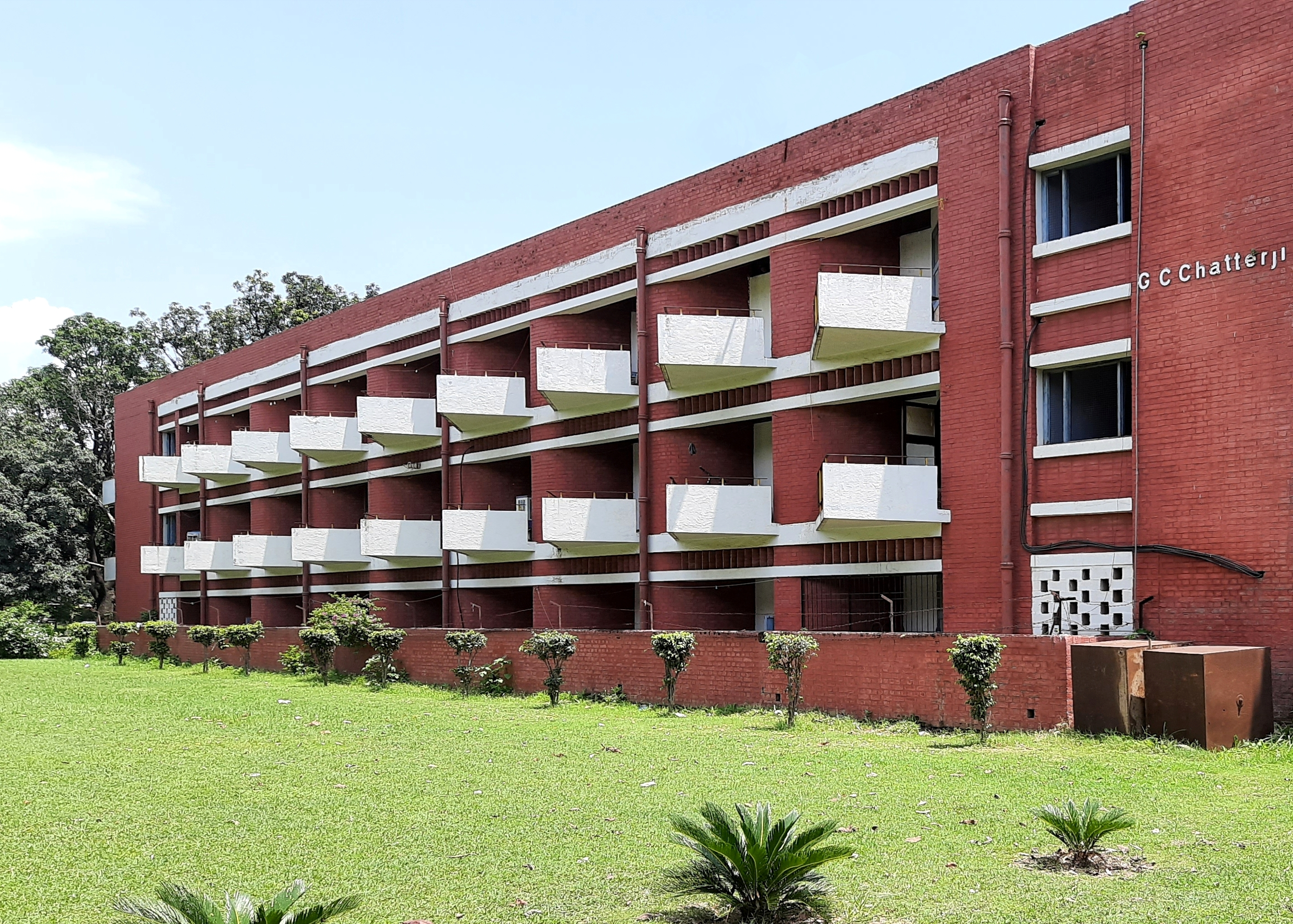
Boys' Hostel, Panjab University, Chandigarh.

There are eighteen hostels on the campus including eight hostels for men and eleven women hostels including a Working Women Hostel. A Sports Hostel has been built for visiting sports teams. Two more hostels are under construction, one each for boys and girls. There is one International hostel also. All the NRI/Foreign national girls students are accommodated there.

=== Sports ===
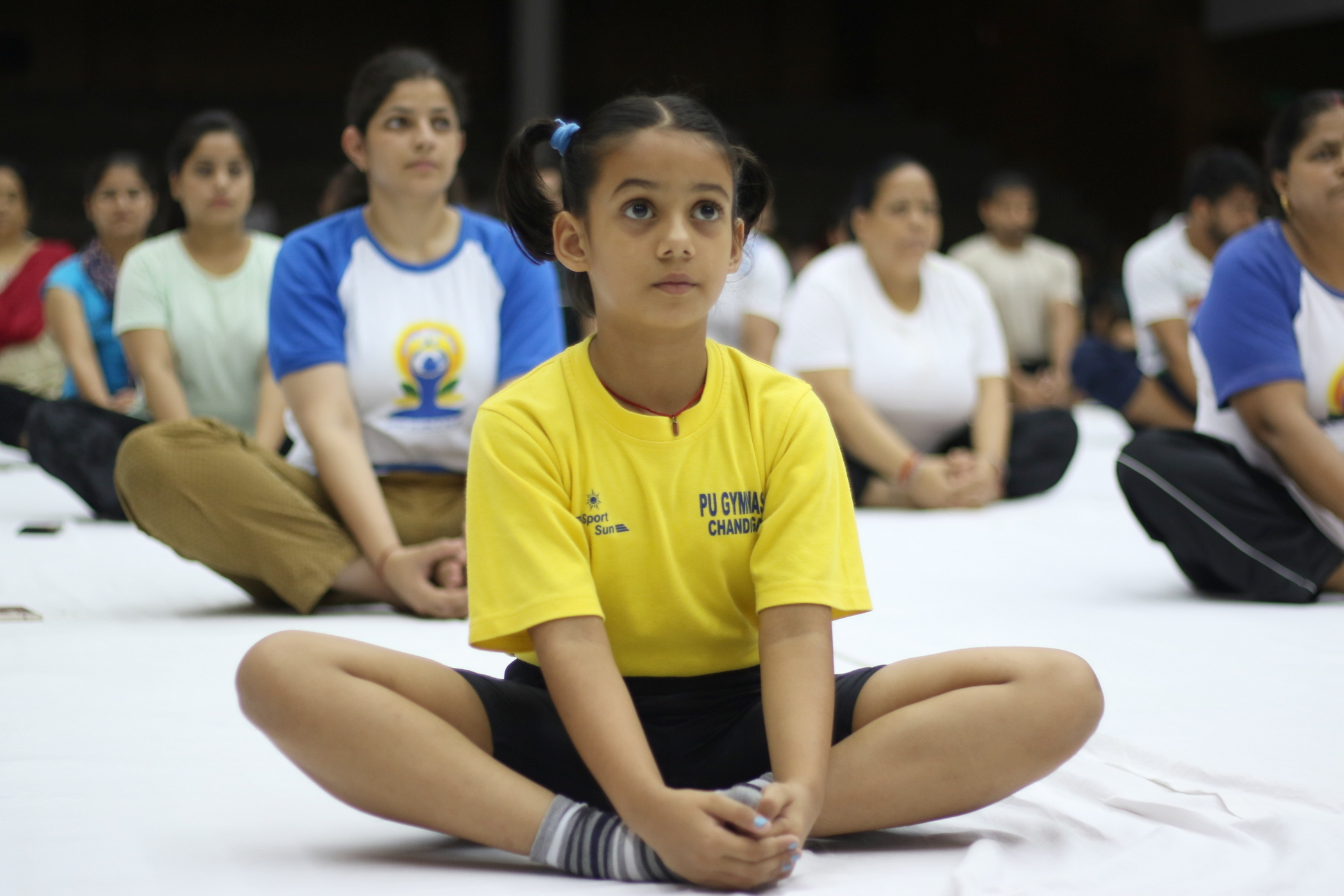
A girl student doing yoga on International Yoga Day at Panjab University, Chandigarh (India); click by Vikash Kinha

The university has playgrounds, a gymnasium and a swimming pool for its sports activities. The Directorate of Sports organises about 70 Inter-College and four to five Inter-University Competitions every year. The Directorate of Sports participates in 62 games both for men and women in the Inter-University Competitions and arranges training camps in these games under the supervision of expert coaches. The university has been awarded Maulana Abul Kalam Azad (MAKA) Trophy sixteenth times, the latest being in the year 2021 and making a hat-trick twice. MAKA Trophy represents the highest award given for inter-university sports and university sportsperson performance in the international and national arena by the Government of India.

=== Gandhi Bhawan ===
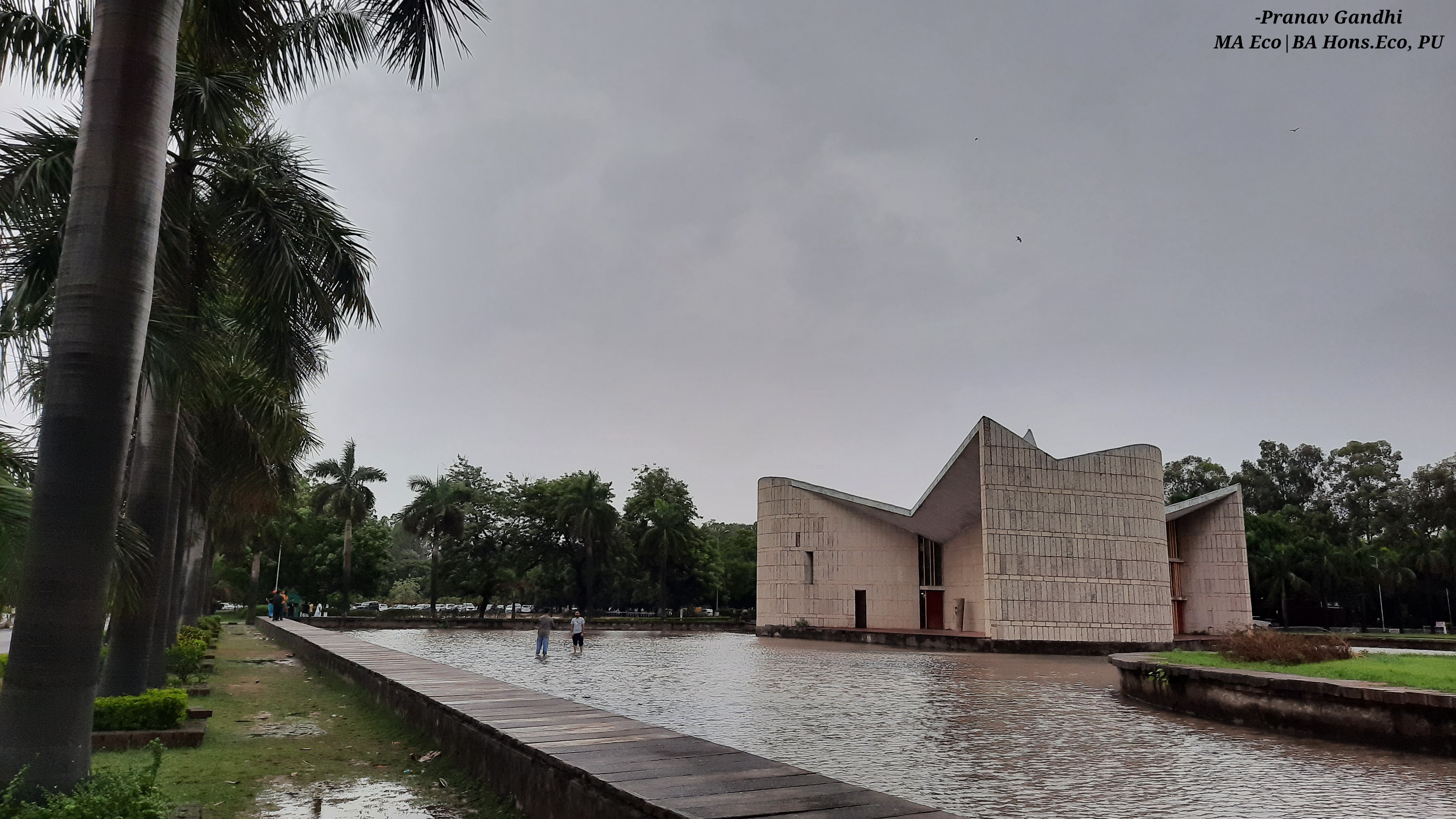
Gandhi Bhawan, Panjab University, Chandigarh

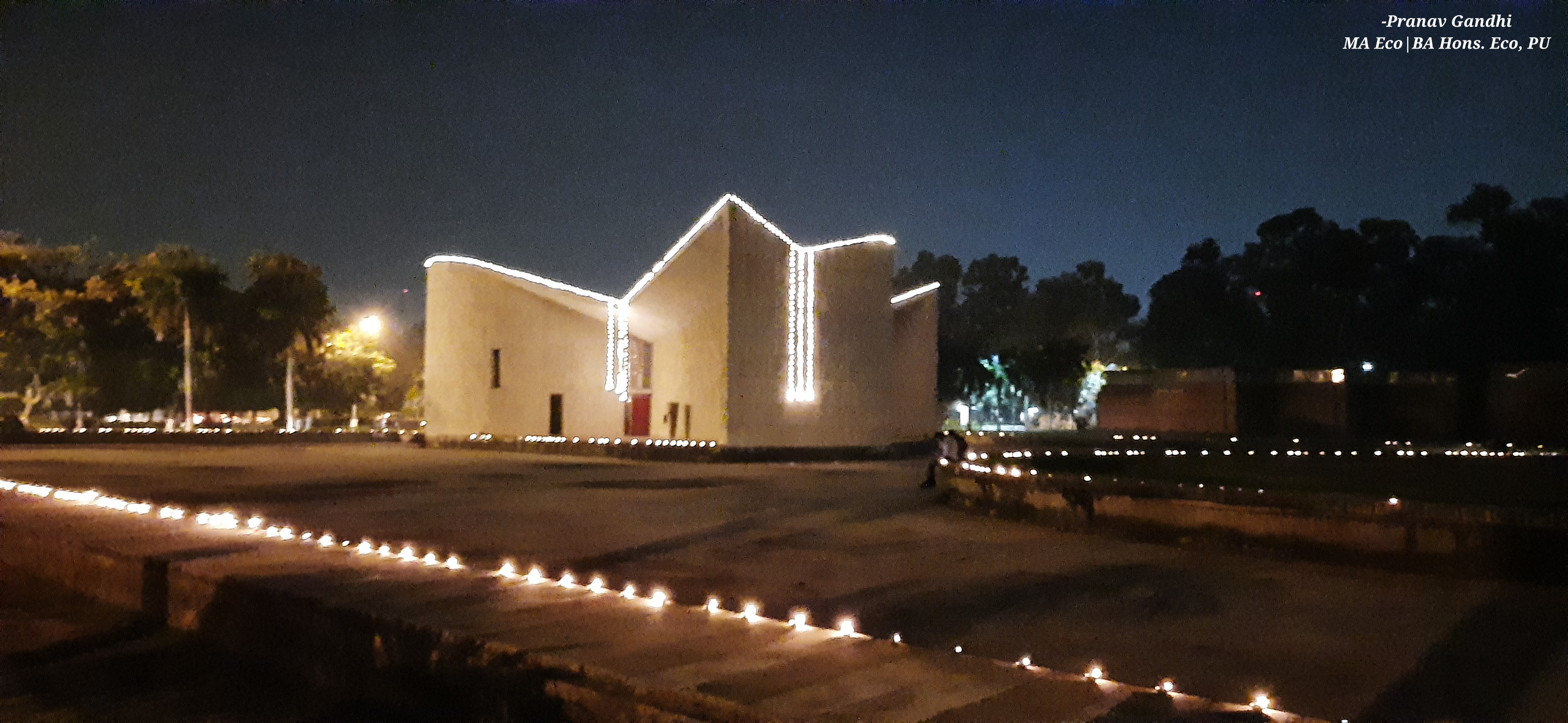
Lighting of diyas on campus.

The Gandhi Bhawan is a major landmark of the city of Chandigarh. Designed by the architect Pierre Jeanneret, a cousin of Le Corbusier, it is an auditorium hall that sits in the middle of a pond of water. It also houses a collection of books on Gandhi.

=== The Student Centre ===
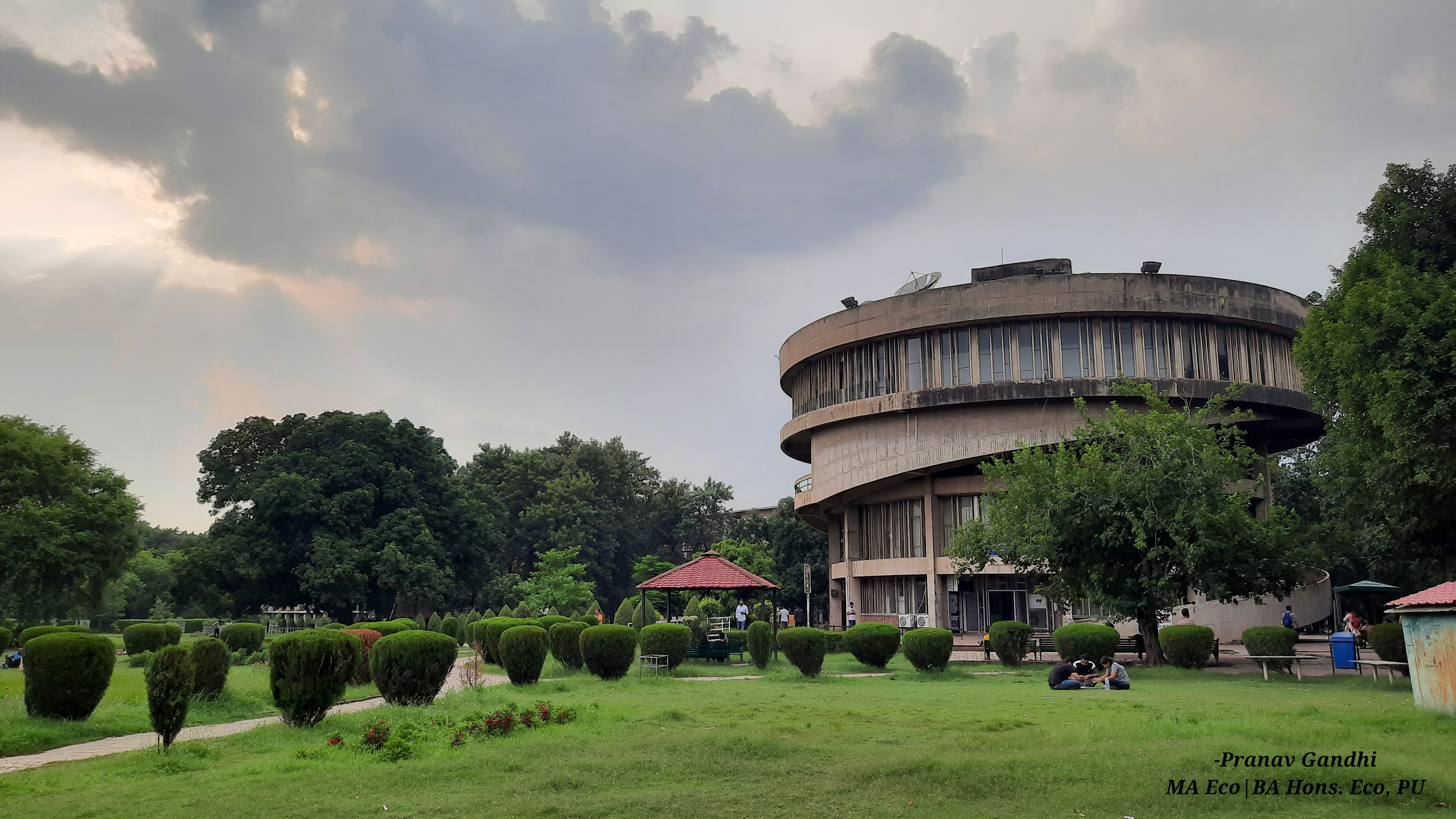
Student Centre, Panjab University, Chandigarh

The Student Centre, popularly known as StuC, is a major landmark of the city of Chandigarh and a hub for student activities. It was inaugurated in 1975. It houses the office of the Dean University Welfare and university students' council. There is a cafeteria called Indian Coffee House with a panoramic view on the top floor of the centre it was shut down during COVID 19 Pandemic but now resumed its operations. Various events and plays are performed in the Student Centre.

=== Library ===
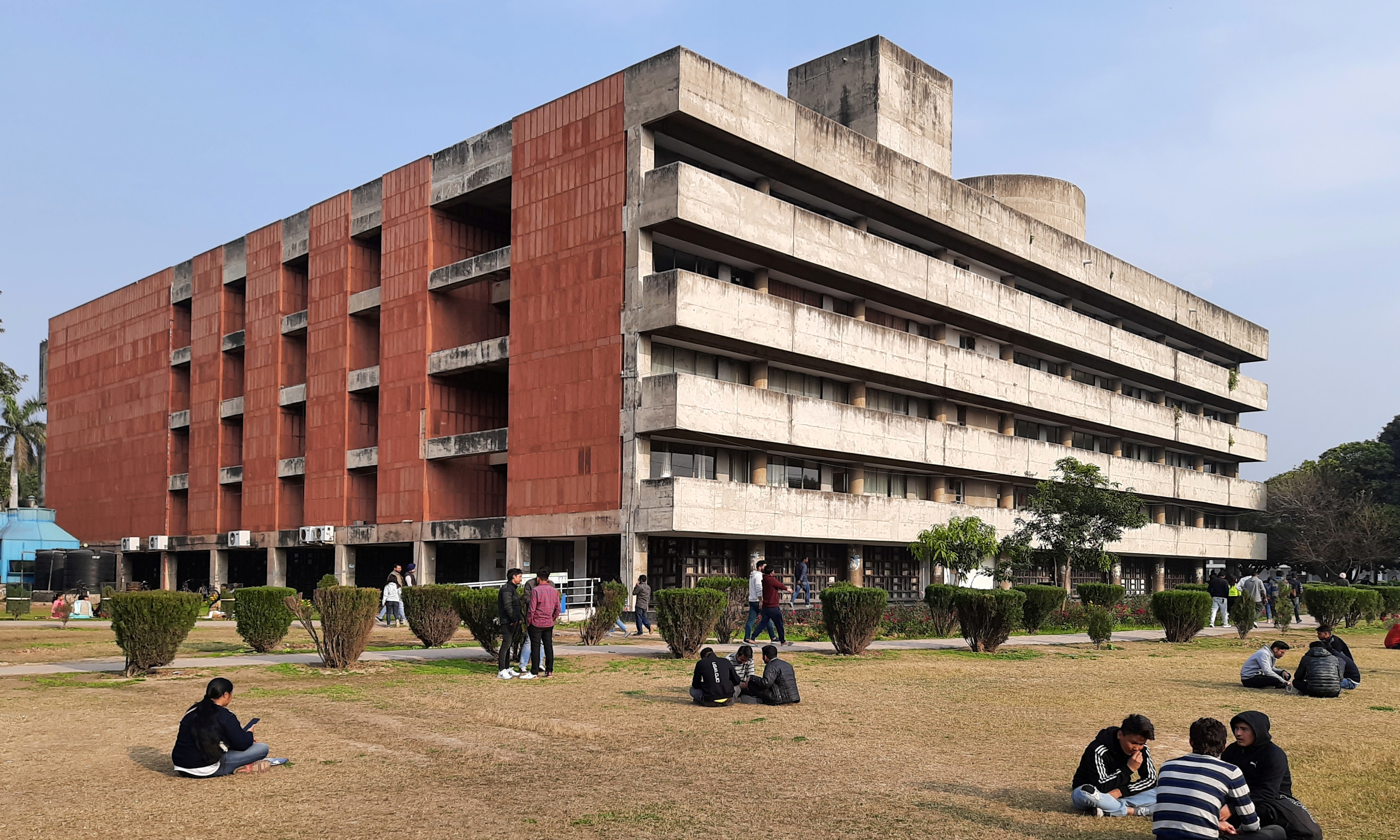
The Central Library, Panjab University, Chandigarh.

The Central Library is named after its late Vice-Chancellor of the university, Prof. A C Joshi. It is located near the student centre. It was designed by Swiss architect Pierre Jeanneret. The foundation stone of the Library was laid in 1958 by Dr Sarvepalli Radhakrishnan, the then vice-president of India, and it was formally inaugurated in 1963 by the then Prime Minister of India Jawaharlal Nehru. With a collection of 6,70,000 titles, it is one of the largest libraries in North India.

=== Museum of Fine Arts ===
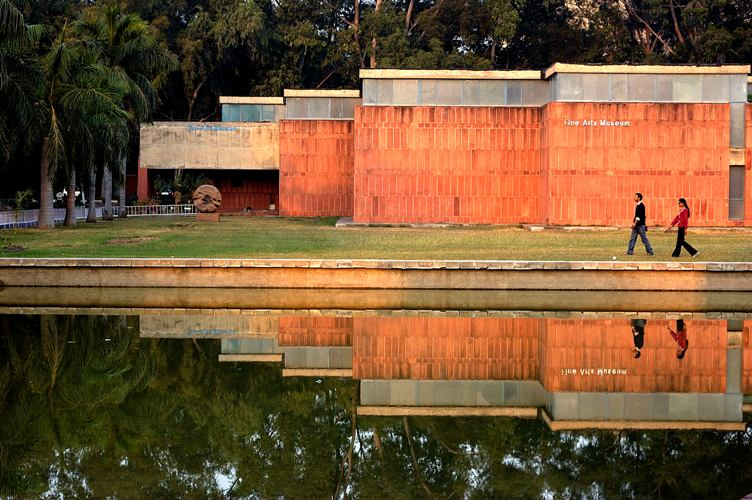
Fine Arts museum, Chandigarh

Museum of Fine Arts is a part of the Department of Art History and Visual Arts, inaugurated in 1968. The Museum building, made in red sandstone, is one of the landmarks in the university campus and has been earmarked as a heritage building. It has a large collection of works of contemporary Indian art, including paintings, sculptures, graphics and drawings by artists such as Jamini Roy, M.F. Husain, Satish Gujral, J. Swaminathan, Ram Kumar, A. Ramachandran, K.G. Subramanyan, Vivan Sundaram, Bhupen Khakhar, Dhanraj Bhagat, Arpana Caur, Shiv Singh etc.

== Organization and administration ==
=== Governance ===
The day-to-day functioning of the university is headed by Vice Chancellor. The office of the Dean of University Instruction (DUI) is the academic head of Panjab University and its Regional Centres. The Vice President of India acts as the university Chancellor

=== Internal Organizational Structure ===
Panjab University Internal Structure shown in Orgranogram.

== Faculties ==
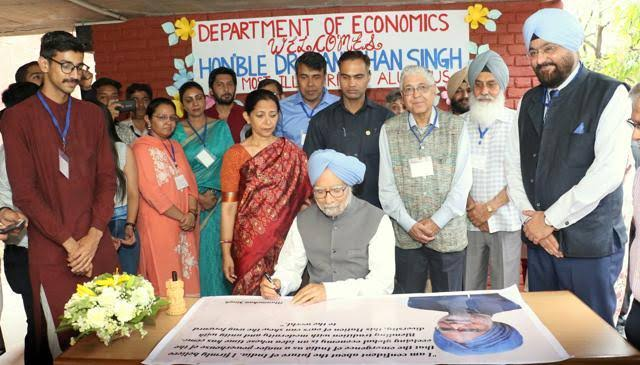
Dr Manmohan Singh, an alumnus of Economics Department, Panjab University at his alma mater to deliver a guest lecture.

=== Faculty of Engineering and Technology ===
- University Institute of Engineering and Technology (UIET) is an on campus engineering institute. It offers undergraduate B.E., Postgraduate M.E. and Doctoral D.Tech. courses. UIET is in the southern campus of Panjab University, Sector 25, Chandigarh. It has two academic blocks which include labs, offices, library, and lecture halls. There are blocks for mechanical labs and workshops. There is an ATM. Wi-Fi and Internet access is provided in some parts of the campus. Students are from all over the nation: few are day scholars and many live in hostels which provide accommodation, food, washrooms, and sporting facilities.
- University Institute for Chemical Engineering and Technology (UICET), originally called the Department of Chemical Engineering and Technology, UICET came out of a demand to make the sciences of direct use to society. The department was disrupted during the partition of India when most of the faculty and students chose to come to India. For a few years, it was housed in Delhi. Then in 1958, it shifted to its present premises in Chandigarh. In collaboration with the Illinois Institute of Technology, Chicago. Professor R. E. Peck from IIT Chicago joined as the first Head. Over the years the department evolved into the University Institute for Chemical Engineering and Technology. In 1983, an Energy Research Institute was added within the UICET building to promote R&D in the field of renewable energy.

UICET is one of the regional centres of the Indian Institute of Chemical Engineers. 2008 was the Golden Jubilee year of the institute. As part of the celebrations, the institute hosted CHEMCON-2008, the 61st annual session of the Indian Institute of Chemical Engineers, which also included a joint US-India Conference on Energy.

=== Faculty of Law ===
The university has two departments for teaching law. The Department of Laws and University Institute of Legal Studies (UILS) are both highly reputed departments in the field of law in India.

The Department of Laws, originally established at Lahore in 1889, was re-established at Shimla in 1948, shifted to Jalandhar in 1950 and finally re-located at the University Campus at Chandigarh in 1959. Its alumni include Judges of the Supreme Court and High Courts, Union Cabinet Ministers, State Chief Ministers, Cabinet Ministers, Ambassadors, Senior Bureaucrats, Police Officers and other legal luminaries.

- Department of Laws offers four courses:
  - Doctor of Laws & Doctor of Philosophy in Law (Ph.D)
  - Degree of LL.B., a three-year course, The Entrance test for Bachelor of Laws (LL.B.) based on PUCET (PG) shall be open to all such candidates who possess minimum 45% marks in any stream in graduation or masters level.
  - Degree in LL.M. (Master of Laws), a one-year course, which is offered after completion of LL.B.
  - Degree in LL.M. (Master of Laws), a two-year evening programme as a self-financed course. This course is started in 2025.

The department of laws conducts separate admission tests for the courses. The Department is the pride alma mater of three Chief Justices of India, a large number of Chief Justices of the High Courts, members of subordinate judiciary, civil servants, law officers and members of the legal profession and a large number of legal luminaries and justices. The number of its alumni, which rose to the bench of the Supreme Court and in many High Courts of this country, is too large to mention. Chief Justice of India Dr. A.S. Anand, the former Chief Justice of India taught in this department for a number of years. The Chief Justice of India Hon'ble Mr. Justice J.S. Khehar is also an alumnus and has taught in the department as well.

University Institute of Legal Studies (UILS) was established as constituent department of Panjab University, in the academic session 2004-05. During a short span of time, it has emerged as one of the premier legal Institute with a unique blend of tradition and modernity. Its mission is to equip the students with the skills to comprehend and diagnose the intricacies of various legal and other inter-disciplinary issues and devise solutions to these problems through analysis and reasoning. The stimulating and interactive academic environment of the Institute helps to hone the Drafting, Research, Advocacy, Interviewing and Negotiation- skills of the students. To accomplish this, the Institute arranges a number of curricular and extra-curricular activities. Students are trained in essence of the substantive laws, techniques of procedural laws, methods of client counselling and skills in legal and social sciences research etc. The Moot Court Competitions, Client Counselling Sessions, Quiz Contests, Seminars, Group Discussions and Extension Lectures etc. are a regular feature of the academic calendar of the Institute. The Institute also exposes its students to the 'law in action' through compulsory internships with Hon'ble Judges of Supreme Court, Punjab and Haryana High Court, eminent lawyers, legal firms, various commissions and NGOs, etc. The Institute's own Legal Aid Clinic, not only provides free legal services to the economically weaker sections of the society as a part of community outreach programme of the Institute, but also offers opportunities to the students to work in co-ordination with eminent practicing advocates. The endeavour behind these action oriented 'programmes' is to enable the students to understand that the legal professionals, besides their professional responsibilities have a significant impact on the society at large. The department also offers four courses. It includes B.A. LL.B (Hons.) and B.Com. LL.B (Hons.) five-years integrated courses and has 180 seats for each course. The department also offers LL.M (Master of Laws), both of one- and two-year duration. There is separate entrance for all the courses. The LL.M. course has separate seats reserved for both Advocates and Judicial Officers.

=== Faculty of Business Management and Commerce ===
- University Business School (UBS) imparts commerce and business management education. The Department of Commerce and Business Management was rechristened into University Business School in 1995. The department offers various courses such as M.Com (Honours), Ph.D (Commerce and Business Management), M.B.A (General), M.B.A (Entrepreneurship), M.B.A (Human Resource Management), M.B.A (International Business) and Executive M.B.A.
- University Institute of Applied Management Sciences (UIAMS), established in 2008 by the Faculty of Business Management & Commerce, Panjab University, Chandigarh. It is housed in the south campus, Sector 25. UIAMS offers M.B.A course in industry ready sectoral areas and streams with specialization in functional areas like Marketing, Finance, Human Resources and Operations. M.B.A at UIAMS Chandigarh is a two-year course. Students are given training offers with stipend by various leading companies during the course. UIAMS graduates tend to benefit from good job placements in major companies.
- University Institute of Hotel and Tourism Management (UIHTM) offers education, training, research and consultancy in the field of hospitality, tourism, travel and allied sectors. This institute was established in the year 2009 under the faculty of Business Management and Commerce.

=== Faculty of Pharmaceutical Sciences ===
- The National Institutional Ranking Framework (NIRF) ranked the university 7th (in 2024), 8th (in 2023) and 3rd (in 2022) in the Pharmacy ranking.

=== Faculty of Medical Sciences ===
- Government Medical College and Hospital, Chandigarh, Sector 32 Chandigarh
- Dr. Harvansh Singh Judge Institute of Dental Sciences & Hospital

=== Constituent colleges ===
- Baba Balraj Panjab University Constituent College, Balachaur (SBS Nagar)
- Panjab University Constituent College, Mokham Khan Wala (Ferozepur)
- Panjab University Constituent College, Nihalsingh Wala (Moga)
- Panjab University Constituent College, Dharamkot (Moga)
- Panjab University Constituent College, Sikhwala (Sri Muktsar Sahib)
- Saheed Udham Singh Panjab University Constituent College, Guru Har Sahai (Ferozpur)

=== Regional centres ===
Originally, the university had three regional centres, one each in Ludhiana, Rohtak and Shimla. Currently, the university has following regional centres in the state of Punjab:

- Panjab University Regional Centre, Ludhiana
- Panjab University Regional Centre, Muktsar
- Panjab University Swami Sarvanand Giri Regional Centre, Hoshiarpur

=== Rural Regional Centres ===
- Panjab University Rural Centre, Kauni

== Academics ==
=== Departments and courses ===
The university comprises 78 departments, 15 centres/chairs on the campus and six Constituent Colleges located at Sikhwala (Sri Muktsar Sahib), Balachaur (SBS Nagar), Nihalsingh Wala (Moga), Dharamkot (Moga), Mokham Khan Wala (Ferozepur) and Guru Harsahai (Ferozepur) and one rural regional centre. Three regional centres are grouped under the faculties of Arts, Science, Languages, Law, Education, Design and Fine Arts, Business Management and Commerce, Engineering and Technology, Hotel Management and Tourism, Medical Sciences, and Pharmaceutical Sciences. There are also departments of Evening Studies and Distance Learning. Most departments have their own libraries. The Faculty of Languages also has courses in foreign languages. The Department of Chinese and Tibetan languages runs 7 courses. One in Buddhist Studies and three each in Tibetan and Chin. besides providing research guidance in Buddhist Studies.

== Accreditations and Rankings ==
=== Internal Quality Assurance Cell (IQAC) ===
The Internal Quality Assurance Cell (IQAC) at Panjab University was established on 1 May 2003.

==== Accreditations ====
Panjab University has undergone multiple cycles of accreditation by the National Assessment and Accreditation Council (NAAC), reflecting its commitment to maintaining high educational standards. The accreditation details are as follows:

- Cycle 1: Accredited on 21 May 2001, Panjab University received a Five Star rating with a score of 75.75.
- Cycle 2: On 29 January 2009, the university was awarded an 'A' grade with a CGPA of 3.47.
- Cycle 3: During the third cycle on 25 June 2015, it secured an 'A' grade with a CGPA of 3.35.
- Cycle 4: The most recent accreditation, dated 12 August 2023, saw the university achieving an 'A++' grade with a CGPA of 3.68.

==== Rankings ====
University rankings

General – international
- QS (World) (2023): 1201–1400
- QS (Asia) (2023): 301–350
- Times (World) (2023): 801–1000

General – India
- NIRF (Overall) (2024): 60
- NIRF (Research) (2024): 35
- NIRF (Universities) (2024): 38

Engineering – India
- NIRF (2024): 101

Business/Management – India
- NIRF (2024): 92

Pharmacy – India
- NIRF (2024): 7

Dental – India
- NIRF (2024): 27

Internationally, Panjab University was ranked 1001–1200 in the QS World University Rankings of 2025 and 301–350 in Asia. It was ranked 801–1000 in the world by the Times Higher Education World University Rankings of 2023, 201–250in Asia in 2023 and 201–250 among emerging economies.

In India, the 2025 National Institutional Ranking Framework (NIRF) rankings have ranked Panjab University 57th overall, 37th in Research, 35th among Universities, 92nd in Management and 3rd in Pharmacy.

== Research ==
=== ICSSR ===
The Indian Council of Social Science Research has set up its North-Western Regional Centre on the campus. The centre runs a library, a seminar complex and a guest house for visiting scholars under its study-grants programme.

=== Institute of Social Science Education and Research ===
Institute of Social Science Education and Research (commonly known as ISSER or PU-ISSER) is a liberal arts institution and a constituent department of the Panjab University. The institute offers a five-year integrated, honour-school Masters of Arts degree in the Social Sciences.

=== Research facilities ===
The university has been recognised by the UGC as the "University with Potential for Excellence in Bio-Medical Sciences" with facilities for Stem Cell Research and Drug Development.

The university is one of six centres in the country for super-computing facilities to serve the north-western region in the Technology Information Forecasting and Assessment Council (TIFAC), DST. The government of India has identified the university as a Special Centre. The university provides internet connections for more than 1800 terminals for the use of faculty members and students. All the buildings of the university including hostels are connected through ATM and Gigabit technology.

The university has a DST supported Regional Sophisticated Instrumentation Centre along with a Central Instrumentation Laboratory (CIL) and a University Science Instrumentation Centre (USIC) to serve the scientific community on the campus and in the region. The Centre for Industry Institute Partnership Programme (CIIPP) promotes the academic-industry interface.

==== Energy Research Centre ====
The Energy Research Centre was established in 1983 at Panjab University to promote R&D and Extension activities in Renewable Energy. The Energy Research Centre is the only R&D centre in the country designated as a Nodal Agency for the implementation of the programmes of MNES.

The centre has been designated as a regional test centre for testing solar thermal equipment by MNES. The Bureau of Indian Standard has approved the centre for testing wood-burning stoves. The centre has provided consultancy to countries in the Asia-Pacific region such as the Maldives, Bangladesh, Sri Lanka, Myanmar, Kiribati and Tuvalu, in the area of renewable energy sources, energy management and environmental protection. The centre has helped the states of Haryana, Panjab and Himachal Pradesh in solving problems associated with energy planning, management and environmental protection.

The centre has done work on solar thermal energy storage, solar detoxification, biomethanation of agricultural/industrial/forest wastes, biomass combustion and gasification, indoor air quality, energy and environmental conservation and management, and hydrodynamics of polymeric solutions. The Energy Research Centre has professional contacts with universities such as the University of Florida, the University of Cincinnati, SRI International USA, and Lakehead University in Canada. The centre has helped the states of Haryana, Punjab and Himachal Pradesh, U.T. Chandigarh, J&K State, and the North-Eastern states in solving problems associated with energy planning and management and Environmental protection.

==== LHC project ====
The university has participated in the project called International Collaboration for Research for Elementary Particles and the Large Hadron Collider (LHC) CERN, Geneva CMS Experiment with a Government of India grant of Rs. 24.9 million.

== Student life ==
=== Cultural events ===
"Cyanide" is the annual festival of DCET/UICET. The festival often hosts star performers, DJ nights and other events. Tatva is the student magazine of DCET/UICET. There is an annual debate competition called the Polemic. Aavishkar was the technical fest of UIET until 2013. Goonj is the techno-cultural fest and Umang is the annual sports fest of UIET.

Panjab University is active on social media websites such as Facebook, Twitter and Instagram.

=== Student council ===
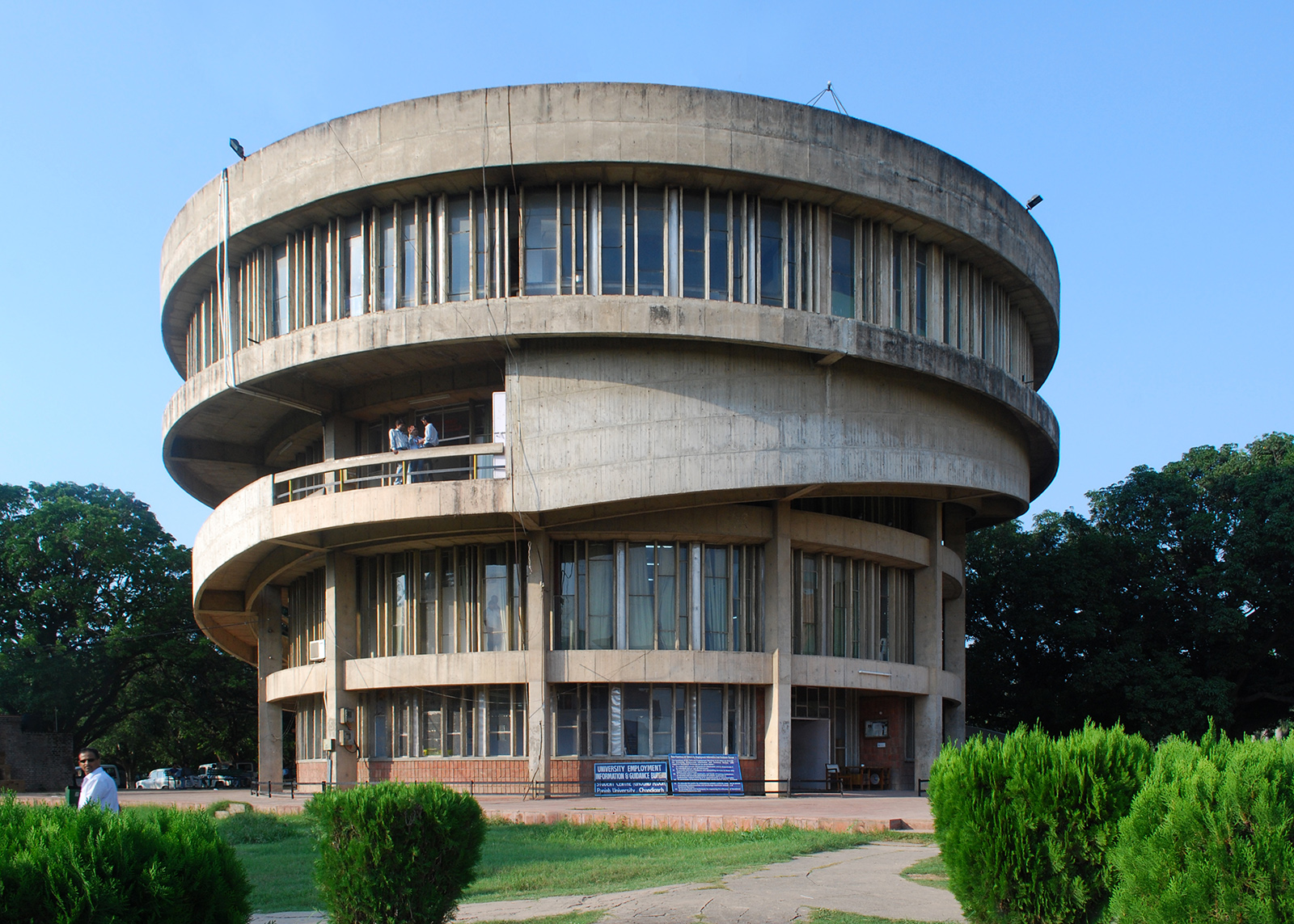
Student Centre, Panjab University

The office of the Panjab University Campus Students Council (PUCSC) is located in the student centre. The student centre is the hub of students' activities – academic, cultural, social and political – besides being the favourite eating and hanging out zone for students. The Students' Council consists of the departmental representatives and other office bearers i.e. president, vice-president, secretary and joint-secretary directly elected by the students from the various teaching departments on the campus. The Dean of Student Welfare is ex officio chairman of the council.

The Students' Council organises youth festivals, both national and international, academic debates, literary and cultural events and educational tours, besides looking after the interests of the students in general. In 2015, in a referendum by University, students voted for vehicle free campus in academic areas.
