= All India Students' Association =

Indian students organisation

- Official symbol of AISA

- Official flag of AISA
- Abbreviation: AISA
- Formation: 9 August 1990; 36 years ago
- Type: Student organisation
- Legal status: Active
- Headquarters: India
- National President: Neha Bora
- National General Secretary: Prasenjeet Kumar
- Affiliations: Communist Party of India (Marxist–Leninist) Liberation
- Website: aisa.in

The All India Students' Association (AISA) is a left-wing student organisation in India. It describes itself as "the voice of the students' movement" and is affiliated with the Communist Party of India (Marxist–Leninist) Liberation. The association was previously affiliated with the IPF.

It was founded in Prayagraj on Kranti Diwas, 9 August 1990, with the merger of several left-wing student organisations across India. The second national conference was held in Delhi in 1994, the third in 1998 at Patna, the fourth in Allahabad (2001), the fifth in Calcutta (2004), and the sixth has recently concluded at Muzaffarpur. AISA has an organisational presence in several states and union territories, including Delhi, Chandigarh, Uttarakhand, Uttar Pradesh, Assam, Bihar, Jharkhand, West Bengal, Karnataka and Tripura, etc.

== Universities ==
The students' association has a presence in various major institutions of higher education in India, such as Patna University, University of Allahabad, Banaras Hindu University, Kumaun University, Jadavpur University, University of Delhi, University of Lucknow, Tata Institute of Social Sciences, Jamia Millia Islamia and Jawaharlal Nehru University, HNB Garhwal University and Ambedkar University, Delhi, among others. A unit of AISA has also consistently won student union elections in Rikhnikhal Degree College, Pauri Garhwal, Uttarakhand, since 2017. From 2013 to 2019 AISA had significant presence in Visva-Bharati the only central university of West Bengal. Activists of AISA have led historical student movements in Visva-Bharati raising voice against gender based violence, Fee Hike, illegal suspension of students demanding campus democracy etc. AISA was the biggest student organisation of Visva-Bharati at the time with presence in more than 20 departments and institutes.

AISA has consistently won in Jawaharlal Nehru University Students' Union elections since 2006. The victory of AISF in the 2015 JNUSU elections marked the only occasion when AISA lost the presidency.

Since 2013, AISA has been one of the major left forces in Delhi University Students' Union elections. Though AISA is frequently criticized by other Left students' Unions like Krantikari Yuva Sangathan and Disha Students' Organization as revisionist and electoralist.

== Office bearers ==
As of 7 October 2025, the national president of the All India Students' Association (AISA) is Neha Bora, and the national general secretary is Prasenjeet Kumar.

== Notable alumni ==
- Chandrashekhar Prasad
- Sandeep Saurav
- Kavita Krishnan

== See also ==
- Revolutionary Youth Association
- All India Students Federation
- Students' Federation of India
