= List of Indian student organisations =

List of student organisations in India

This is a list of Indian student organisations, divided by the level at which they operate. The political position and ideology columns reflect the associated parent organisation or the organisation's stated aims, and are left blank where no source gives one.

== National-level organisations ==
| Name | Full name | Associated with | Political position | Ideology |
|---|---|---|---|---|
| ABVP | Akhil Bharatiya Vidyarthi Parishad | Rashtriya Swayamsevak Sangh | Right-wing | Hindutva |
| AIDSO | All India Democratic Students' Organisation | Socialist Unity Centre of India (Communist) | Far-left | Anti-capitalism, Social conservatism, Shibdas Ghosh thoughts |
| AIMSF | All India Muslim Students Federation | All-India Muslim League (dissolved 1947) | Far-right | Separatism, Muslim nationalism, Islamic modernism, Two-nation theory |
| AIRSF | All India Revolutionary Students Federation | Communist Party of India (Maoist) (banned) | Far-left | Communism, Marxism–Leninism–Maoism |
| AISA | All India Students' Association | Communist Party of India (Marxist–Leninist) Liberation | Far-left | Communism, Marxism–Leninism, Mao Zedong Thought |
| AISF | All India Students' Federation | Communist Party of India | Left-wing | Communism, Marxism–Leninism |
| ASAP | Association of Students for Alternative Politics (formerly the Chhatra Yuva Sangharsh Samiti) | Aam Aadmi Party | Centre | Populism, Secularism, Nationalism |
| CFI | Campus Front of India | Popular Front of India (banned 2022) | Far-right | Islamism |
| FM | Fraternity Movement | Welfare Party of India | Outside the left–right divide | Democracy, social justice (stated aims) |
| NSUI | National Students' Union of India | Indian National Congress | Centre | Liberalism, Social democracy, Secularism, Civic nationalism |
| PSU | Progressive Students' Union | Revolutionary Socialist Party (India) | Left-wing | Communism, Revolutionary socialism, Marxism–Leninism |
| RSU | Radical Students Union | Communist Party of India (Maoist) (banned) | Far-left | Communism, Marxism–Leninism–Maoism |
| SFI | Students' Federation of India | Communist Party of India (Marxist) | Left-wing | Communism, Marxism–Leninism, Socialism, Secularism |
| SIO | Students Islamic Organisation of India | Jamaat-e-Islami Hind | Far-right | Islamism |

== State-level organisations ==
| Name | Full name | Associated with | Political position | Ideology |
|---|---|---|---|---|
| AAMSU (Manipuri) | All Assam Manipuri Students' Union | Independent | - | Associate official language status for Manipuri in Assam |
| AAMSU (Minorities) | All Assam Minority Students' Union | Independent (helped found the United Minorities Front, Assam) | - | Minority rights |
| AAPSU | All Arunachal Pradesh Students' Union | Independent | - | Indigenous rights; campaigns against citizenship for Chakma and Hajong refugees |
| AASU | All Assam Students' Union | Independent | - | Assamese nationalism |
| ACKHSA | All Cachar Karimganj Hailakandi Students Association | Barak Democratic Front | - | Barak Valley statehood |
| AISSF | All-India Sikh Students' Federation | Shiromani Akali Dal (founded as its wing; now split into factions) | Right-wing | Sikh nationalism; Khalistan advocacy by some factions |
| ATASU | All Tai Ahom Students' Union | Independent | - | Tai Ahom community interests; Scheduled Tribe status demand |
| INSO | Indian National Students Organisation | Jannayak Janta Party (INSO's youth leadership largely backed Dushyant Chautala in the 2018 INLD split) | Centre-right | Devi Lal's legacy (as claimed) |
| ISO | INLD Students Organization | Indian National Lok Dal | Centre | Regionalism |
| KSU | Kerala Students' Union | Indian National Congress | Centre | Liberalism, Social democracy, Secularism, Civic nationalism |
| MSF | Muslim Students Federation | Indian Union Muslim League | Centre-right | Islamic democracy, Liberal conservatism |
| MZP | Mizo Zirlai Pawl | Independent | - | Mizo community interests; pressed for the 1986 peace settlement |
| NCSU | National Conference Students' Union | Jammu & Kashmir National Conference | Centre-left | Kashmiriyat, Jammu and Kashmir statehood, Social democracy, Regionalism, Civic nationalism |
| NSF | Naga Students' Federation | Independent | - | Naga nationalism |
| SOI | Student Organisation of India | Shiromani Akali Dal | Centre-right to right-wing | Conservatism, Punjabiyat, Punjabi nationalism, Federalism |
| TMCP | Trinamool Chhatra Parishad | Trinamool Congress (split into rival factions in 2026) | Centre | Bengali nationalism, Regionalism, Populism, Welfarism, Progressivism |
| TMPK | Takam Mising Porin Kébang | Mising Bane Kebang (parent organisation) | - | Mising community interests; Sixth Schedule status for the Mising Autonomous Council |
| TNSF | Telugu Nadu Students Federation | Telugu Desam Party | Centre to centre-right | Telugu regionalism, Secularism, Populism, Economic liberalism, Federalism, Neoliberalism |
| TSF | Twipra Students' Federation | Independent | - | Indigenous Tripuri rights; Roman script for Kokborok |
| TSU | Tribal Students Union | Communist Party of India (Marxist) | Left-wing | Communism, Marxism–Leninism, Socialism, Secularism |
| WBSCP | West Bengal Students' Union | Indian National Congress | Centre | Liberalism, Social democracy, Secularism, Civic nationalism |

== Campus-based and local organisations ==
| Name | Full name | Associated with | Political position | Ideology |
|---|---|---|---|---|
| ASA | Ambedkar Students' Association | Independent | Left-wing | Ambedkarism |
| BAPSA | Birsa Ambedkar Phule Students' Association | Independent (founded by members of the United Dalit Students' Forum) | Outside the left–right divide | Ambedkarism |
| NSUD | Naga Students' Union, Delhi | Independent | - | Naga Students Welfare |

== See also ==
- Cockroach Janta Party
- Rashtriya Swayamsevak Sangh
- Conservatism in India
- Hindutva
