= Aeta people =

Ethnic group of the Philippines

Aeta
Agtâ / Aytâ / Íta; Áitâ
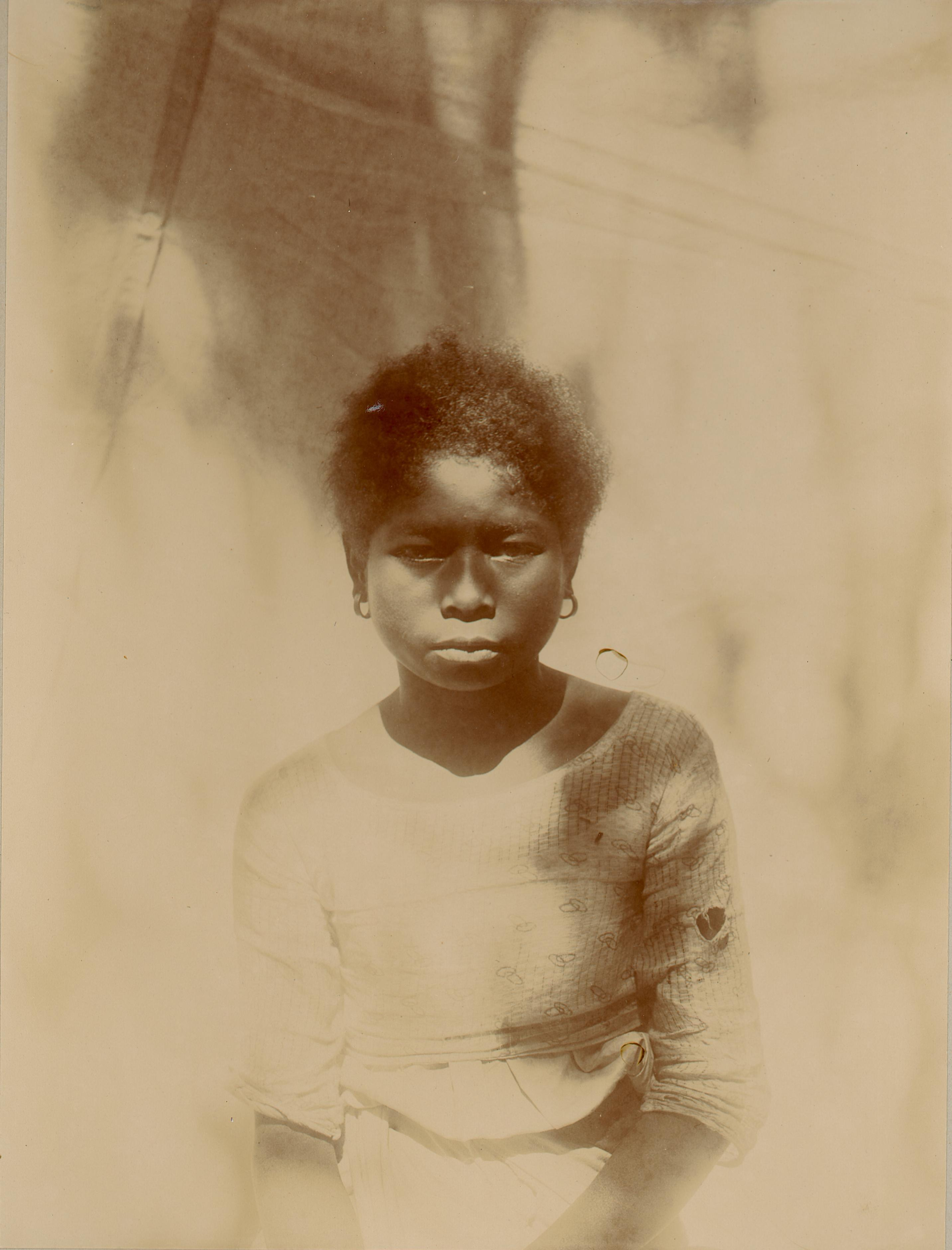
- Young Aeta girl from Mariveles, Bataan, in 1901

Total population
- 50,236

Regions with significant populations
- Philippines

Languages
- Philippine Negrito languages, Kapampangan, Ilocano, Filipino, English

Religion
- Christianity, Anito, folk religions

Related ethnic groups
- Batak, Manobo, Mamanwa; other Negrito peoples

Aeta (Ayta /ˈaɪtə/ EYE-tə), Agta and Dumagat, are collective terms for several indigenous peoples who live in various parts of Luzon islands in the Philippines. They are included in the wider Negrito grouping of South and Southeast Asia, with whom they share superficial common physical characteristics such as: dark skin tones; short statures; frizzy to curly hair; and a higher frequency of naturally lighter hair colour (blondism) relative to the general population. They are thought to be among the earliest inhabitants of the Philippines—preceding the Austronesian migrations. Regardless, the modern Aeta populations have significant Austronesian admixture, and speak Austronesian languages.

Aeta communities were historically nomadic hunter-gatherers, typically consisting of approximately one to five families per mobile group. Groups under the "Aeta" umbrella term are normally referred to after their geographic locations or their common languages.

== Etymology ==
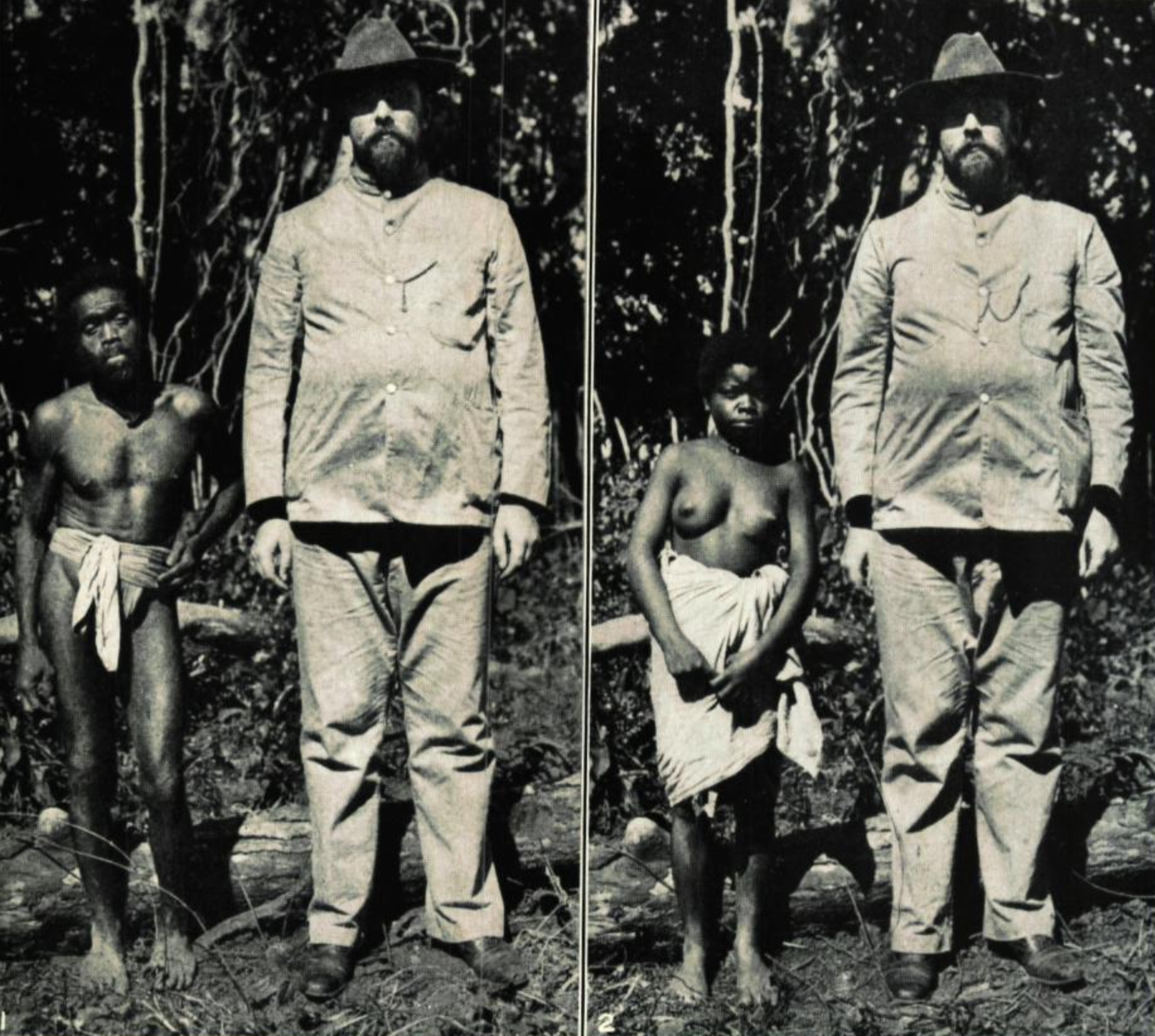
Adult Aeta man and woman with Dean C. Worcester, 1906

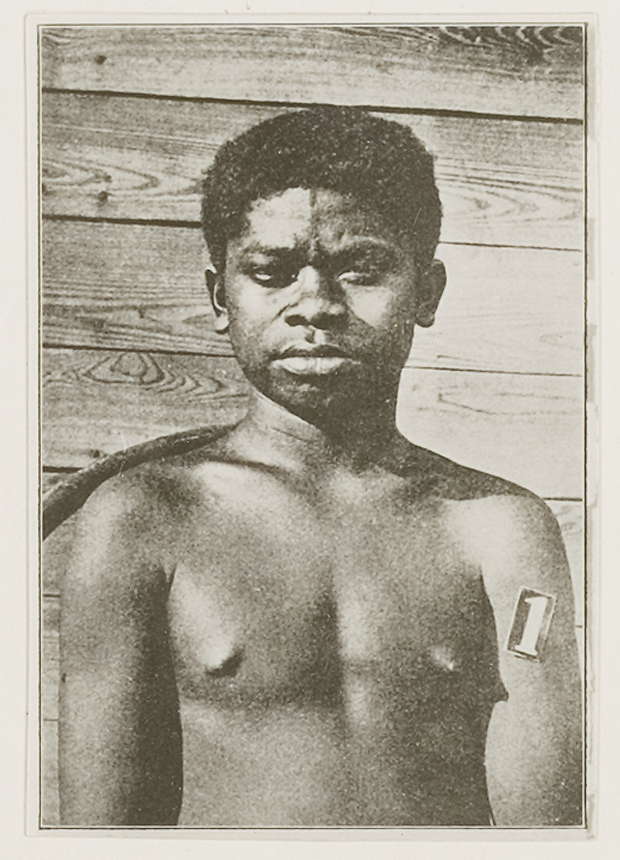
A young Aeta man, circa pre-1930

The endonyms of most of the various Aeta peoples are derived from Proto-Malayo-Polynesian *ʔa(R)ta (also reconstructed as *qata or *ʔata) meaning "[dark skinned] person." This is in contrast to the other terms for "person" in other Philippine (and Oceanian) groups derived from Proto-Malayo-Polynesian *tau (e.g. Tagalog tao), which refers to lighter-skinned groups with majority Austronesian descent. Lawrence A. Reid wrote that *ʔa(R)ta may have originally been the Negrito word for "person" in Northern Luzon, but was adopted into Austronesian languages with the meaning of "dark-skinned person", after the arrival of Austronesian migrants to the Philippines from Taiwan. A common folk etymology is that the name "Aeta" is derived from itom or itim meaning, "black", but this is incorrect.

The term "Dumagat" or "Dumaget" is an exonym meaning "[people] from Magat River." The Luzon Dumagats are not to be confused with the etymology of the Visayan Dumagat ("sea people", from the root word dagat - "sea") who dwell in the coastal areas of Mindanao, contrasting them from inland Lumad.

Other exonyms of the Aeta are more derogatory. These include baluga ("half-breed") and pugot ("head-hunter"). The Aeta themselves call non-Negrito groups with various names that reflect their ancient relationships with Austronesians. These include names like ugsin, ugdin, ogden, or uldin ("red"); putî or pute ("white"); unat ("straight-haired"); or agani ("[rice] harvester").

== Definition ==
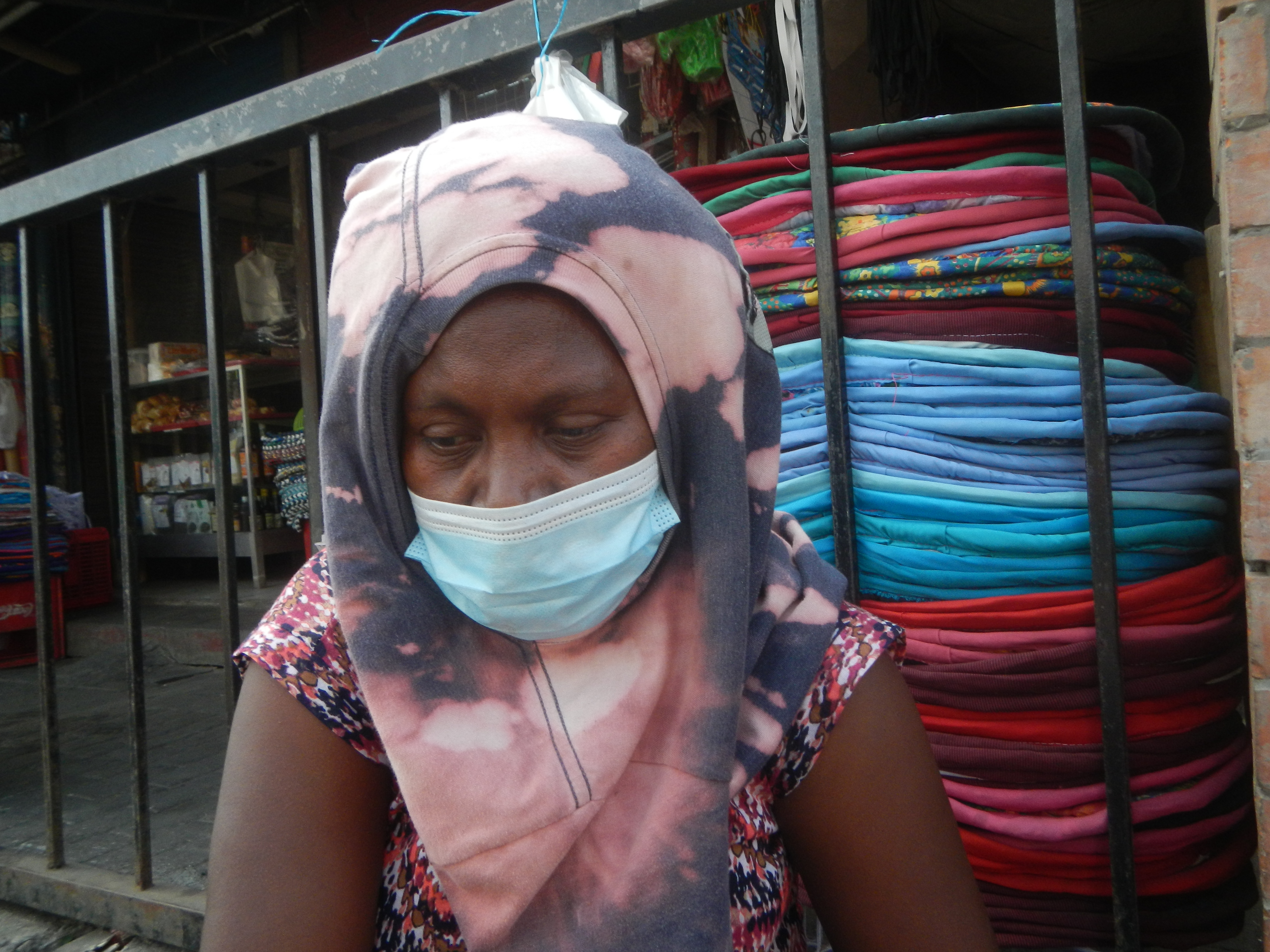
An Aeta woman in Baliwag, Bulacan in March 2021

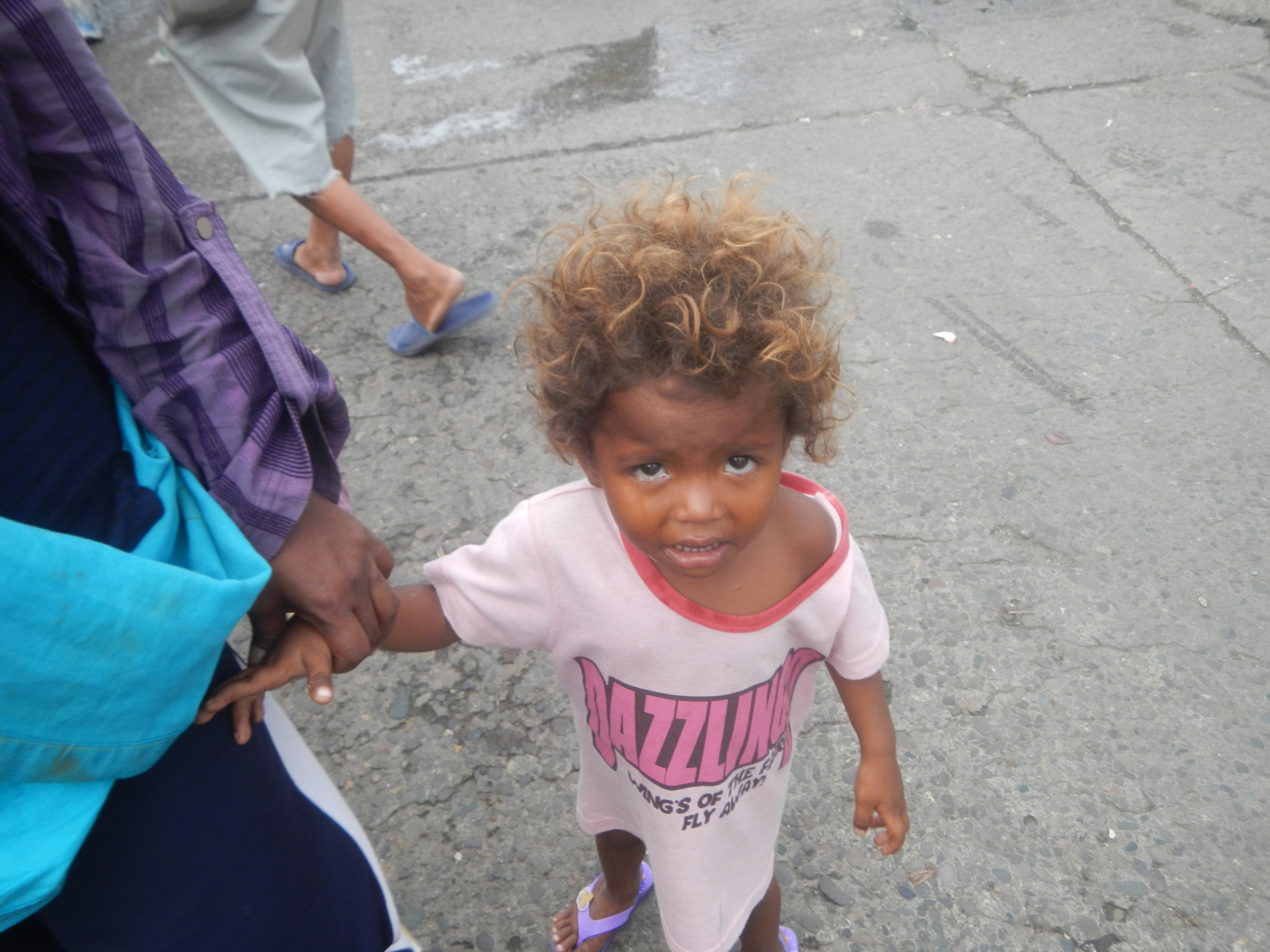
Aeta child in Baliwag in 2021

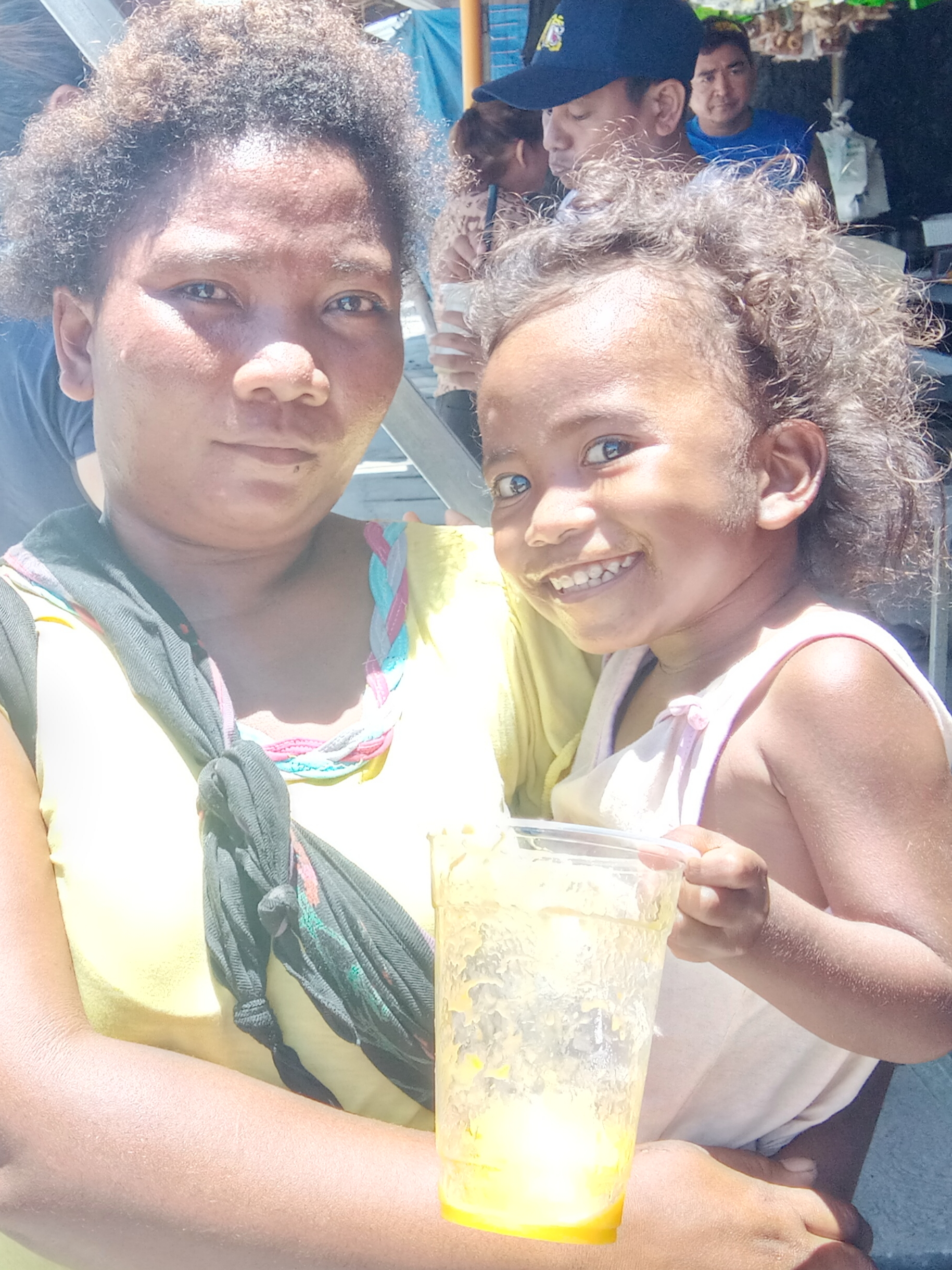
Aeta mother and child from Zambales in 2024

Aeta (also Ayta, Áitâ, Ita, Alta, Arta, Atta, or Agta) is a collective term. Although commonly thought of as a single group, it is in reality composed of several ethnic groups that share similar hunter-gatherer lifestyles and physical features. They are usually divided into three main groups: the Aeta from Central Luzon; the Agta of Southeastern Luzon; and the Dumagat (also spelled Dumaget) of Eastern Luzon. These divisions, however, are arbitrary, and the three names can be used interchangeably. They are also commonly confused with the Ati people of the Visayas Islands.

The following is a list of ethnolinguistic groups usually considered to be Aeta, and the provinces they are from.

- Aeta – Central Luzon

- Ambala Aeta – Zambales, Bataan
- Abellen Aeta (also Abenlen, Abelling or Aburlin) – Tarlac
- Magbukún Aeta (also Magbikin, Magbeken, or Bataan Ayta) – Bataan
- Mag-antsi Aeta (also Mag-anchi or Magganchi) – Zambales, Tarlac, Pampanga
- Mag-indi Aeta (also Maggindi) – Zambales, Pampanga

- Agta – Southeastern Luzon

- Alabat Agta (also Alabat Island Agta) – Quezon
- Agta Cimarron – Camarines Sur
- Manide (also Abiyan Agta or Camarines Norte Agta) – Camarines Norte, Quezon
- Rinconada Agta (also Iriga Agta) – Camarines Sur
- Tabangnon (also Partido Agta, Katabangan, Katubung, or Isarog Agta) – Sorsogon, Quezon, Camarines Sur

- Dumagat – Eastern Luzon

- Alta

- Northern Alta – Aurora
- Southern Alta (also Kabulowan Alta or Edimala) – Quezon, Nueva Ecija

- Arta – Quirino
- Atta

- Faire-Rizal Atta – Cagayan province
- Pamplona Atta – Cagayan province
- Pudtol Atta – Cagayan province

- Casiguran Dumagat – Aurora
- Central Cagayan Dumagat – Cagayan
- Palanan Dumagat – Isabela
- Paranan Dumagat (or Pahanan Dumagat) – Isabela
- Disabungan Dumagat – Isabela
- Dupaningan Dumagat – Cagayan
- Madella Dumagat – Quirino
- Sinauna Tagalog (also Remontado Dumagat) – Rizal, Quezon
- Umiray Dumagat – Quezon, Aurora

== History ==
=== Origins ===
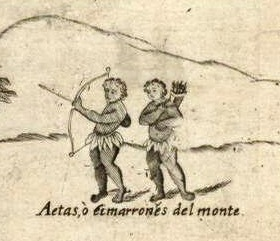
Aetas as illustrated in Carta Hydrographica y Chorographica de las Yslas Filipinas, 1734. The caption in Spanish describes them as "wild men of the mountains".

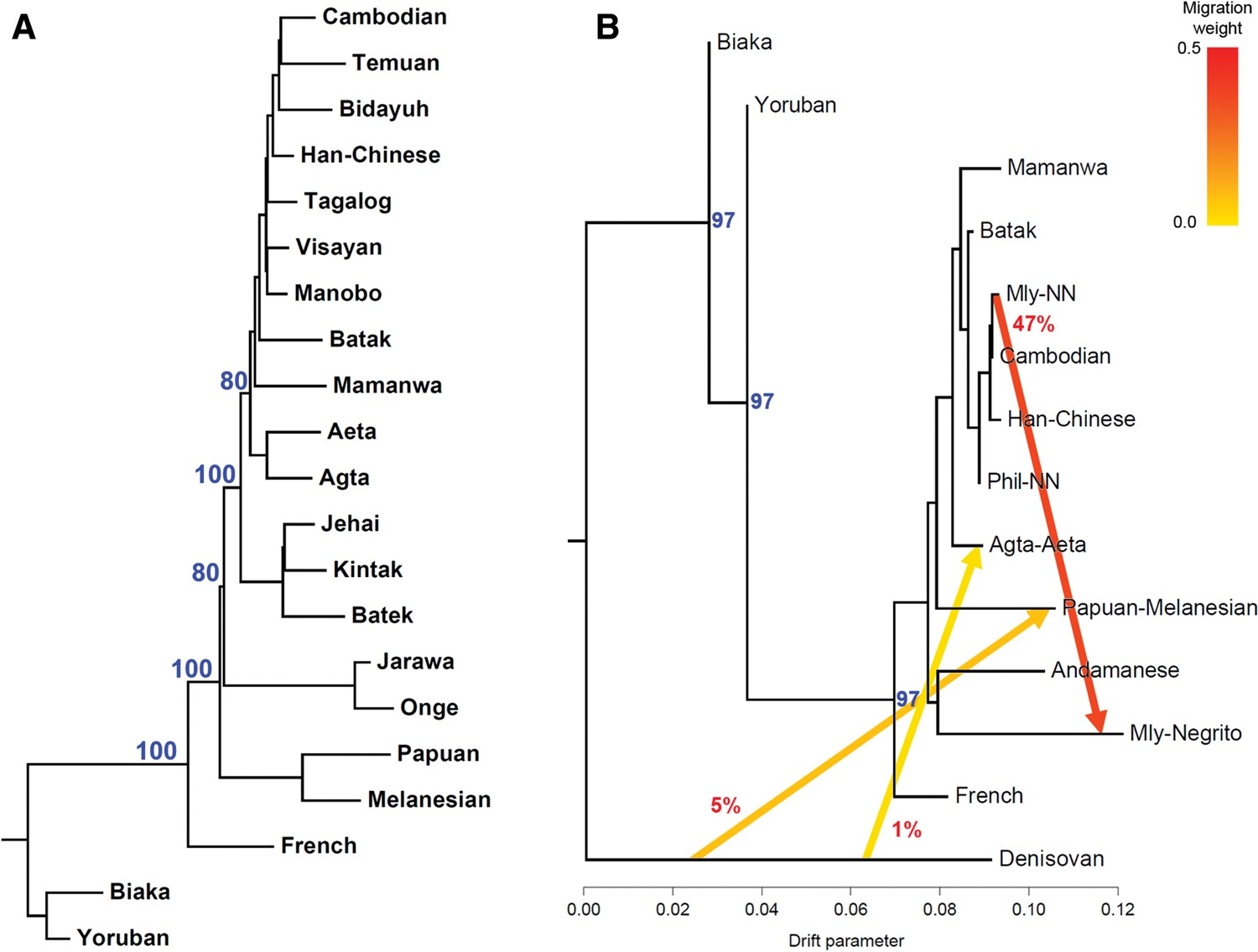
The genetic relationship of Philippine Negritos (Aeta, Agta): (A) Neighbor-joining tree constructed from Nei's standard genetic distance. (B) Maximum-likelihood tree generated using Treemix. This tree shows that following the split from Europeans, the Papuans/Melanesians, split from Andamanese, Malaysian, and Philippine Negritos, which all appear basal to other Southeast and East Asian populations, in that branching order.

The Aeta people in the Philippines are generally grouped together with the wider Negrito population cluster of Southeast Asia, such as the Semang on the Malay Peninsula, or the Andamanese people. The Philippine Negritos display relatively closer genetic affinity towards different Eastern Asian populations, prehistoric Hoabinhian samples, as well as to the Indigenous people of New Guinea and Aboriginal Australians, from which they diverged around c. 40,000 years ago. They also display an internal genetic substructure along a North to South cline, suggesting their ancestral population diverged into two subgroups after the initial peopling of the Philippines. Furthermore, they display high percentages of Denisovan gene flow.

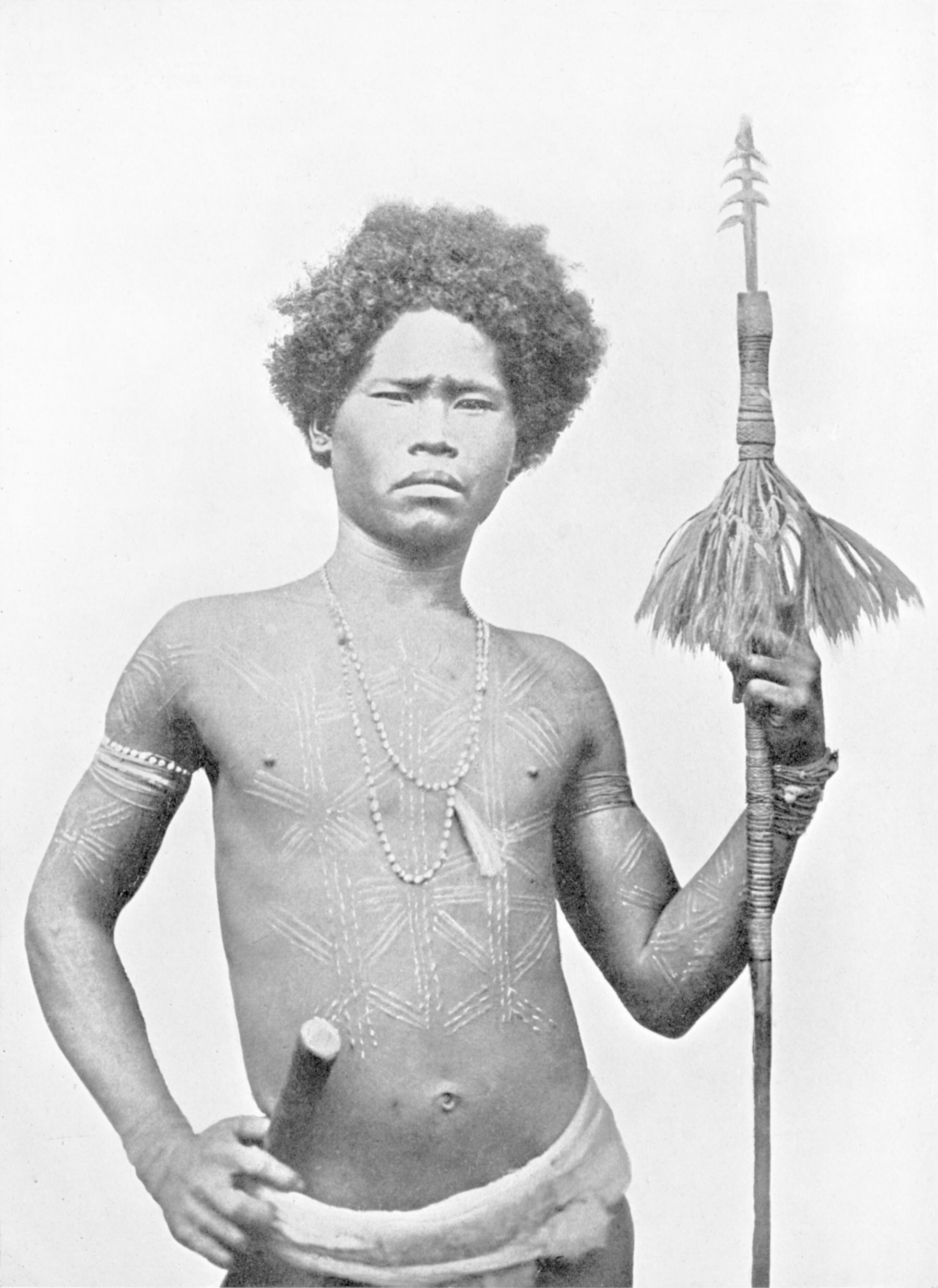
An Aeta man with scarified tattoos (c.1885)

The Aeta are the descendants of the same early "East-Eurasian" meta-population, which also gave rise to modern East Asians and Australasians, among other populations of the Asia-Pacific region. The earliest modern human migrations into the Philippine islands were during the Paleolithic, around 40,000 years ago, followed by two other migration waves between 25,000 and 12,000 years ago, through the Sundaland land bridges that linked the islands with the Asian mainland. The latest migration wave is associated with the Austronesian peoples (c. 7,000 years ago) from Taiwan. Philippine Negritos furthermore display craniometric and dental affinities (Sundadonty) with various southern East Asian and Japanese populations, suggesting deep ancestral ties.

Many modern Aeta display significant Austronesian admixture (~10% to 30%) due to population contact and mixing after the arrival of Austronesians. The modern Aeta speak Austronesian languages, although with a high amount of non-Austronesian vocabulary, and follow a syncretic cultural practices, incorporating many Austronesian elements into their traditional culture. Conversely, other Austronesian Filipino ethnic groups, not traditionally considered Negritos, also have Negrito admixture (~10 to 20%), highlighting mutual contact and influence. Aetas are most closely related to the Batak people of Palawan.

A recent study in 2021 analyzing archaic ancestry in 118 Philippine ethnic groups discovered an independent admixture event into Philippine Negritos from Denisovans. The Ayta Magbukon in particular were found to possess the highest level of Denisovan ancestry in the world (between 3 and 9%), which is about ~30%–40% higher than the amount observed among Australo-Papuans, suggesting that distinct Islander Denisovan populations existed in the Philippines, which admixed with modern humans after their arrival. At the same time, Central Luzon Negritos such as the Ayta Magbukon and Ayta Ambala were also found to have the least amount of Austronesian-derived ancestry of all sampled Philippine ethnic groups, at ~10%–20%.

=== Colonial era contacts and responses ===
Unlike many other Filipino ethnic groups, the Aetas have shown resistance to change. Aetas had little interaction with the Spaniards as they remained in the mountains during the Spanish rule. Even the attempts of the Spaniards to settle them in reducciones or reservations failed all throughout Spanish rule.

According to Spanish observers like Miguel López de Legazpi, Negritos possessed iron tools and weapons. Their speed and accuracy with a bow and arrow were proverbial and they were fearsome warriors. Unwary travelers or field workers were often easy targets. Despite their martial prowess, however, the Aeta's small numbers, primitive economy and lack of organization often made them easy prey for better-organized groups. Zambals seeking people to enslave would often take advantage of their internal feuding. They were often enslaved and sold to Borneo and China, and, unlike the serf feudal system (alipin) imposed on other Filipinos, there was little chance of manumission.

In a report dated March 7, 1881, the General Directorate for Civil Administration of the Spanish government in the Philippines informed the King of Spain that Fray Felix Perez, a missionary, had assembled 50 Aeta families into a barrio in the Capas Township.

American colonizers built Fort Stotsenburg and later Clark Airfield during their years in power, seizing 32,000 hectares of land, thereby dispossessing Aeta communities.

Aeta guerillas and spies formed part of the resistance to the Japanese occupation of the Philippines during World War II.

=== Postwar era ===
Fort Stotsenburg and Clark Airfield were later merged to become Clark Air Base, further institutionalizing the disposession of the Aetas.

=== During the Marcos dictatorship ===
Clark Air Base continued to be an American military facility during the early years of the 21-year presidency of Ferdinand Marcos, and it became a major logistics facilty for the US Armed Forces alongside Subic. Aetas living near both camps were treated poorly at this time, often becoming vicitims of abuse by American soldiers.

=== Later 20th Century ===
The damage caused by the massive Mount Pinatubo eruption in June 1991 forced many aetas to abandon their settlements in Zambales, Tarlac, Pampanga, Panay, Bataan, and Nueva Ecija, and forced them to move to resettlement areas in Pampanga and Tarlac.

== Demographics ==
In 2010, there were 50,236 Aeta people in the Philippines.

== Ancestral lands ==
Aetas are found in Zambales, Tarlac, Pampanga, Panay, Bataan, and Nueva Ecija, but were forced to move to resettlement areas in Pampanga and Tarlac following the devastating Mount Pinatubo eruption in June 1991.

Some Aeta communities have received government land titles recognizing their claims to their ancestral lands.

Parts of Mabalacat City in Pampanga and Bamban town in Tarlac are covered by a Certificate of Ancestral Domain Title (CADT) issued in 2006 to Aeta communities by the National Commission on Indigenous Peoples (NCIP).

A total of 454 Aeta families in Floridablanca, Pampanga, received their CADT on May 27, 2009. The title covers about 7,440 hectares in San Marcelino and Brgy. Batiawan in Zambales and barangays Mawakat and Nabuklod in Floridablanca. It was the first time clean ancestral domain titles were distributed by the NCIP.

A CADT was awarded to 1,501 Aeta families in Botolan, Zambales, on January 14, 2010. The area covers 15,860 hectares that include the four barangays of Villar, Burgos, Moraza and Belbel in Botolan, Zambales, which encompasses the Zambales side of Mount Pinatubo and includes the summit and Lake Pinatubo.

The Aeta Abellen community of Sitio Maporac, Barangay New San Juan, Cabangan, Zambales, received the first Philippine's first Certificate of Ancestral Domain Claim (CADC) on March 8, 1996. The CADT was acquired 16 years later in December 2010.

On May 31, 2022, 848 Aeta families belonging to the Ayta Mag-indi and Ayta Mag-antsi groups were issued their CADT by the NCIP, after the title was approved in 2009. The CADT covers the Pampanga towns of Camias, Diaz, Inararo, Villa Maria and Sapang Uwak in Porac; Sapang Bato in Angeles City; and parts of Floridablanca. The CADT also includes San Marcelino town in Zambales.

Dumagat-Remontado communities inhabit the Sierra Madre mountain range in Rizal and Quezon. Their ancestral domain claims cover parts of the Sierra Madre mountain range. A CADT was issued to Dumagat families in Gabaldon town, Nueva Ecija, in December 2021.

The Pastolan Aeta community owns a CADT covering 4,200 hectares of land, including parts of the Subic Bay Freeport.

Nevertheless, Aeta communities face difficulties in getting ancestral domain titles. Aetas of Tarlac, for example, have failed to get titles for 18,000 hectares of land in Capas despite applications for CADT filed in 1999, 2014, and 2019. Indigenous peoples face "insurmountable bureaucratic hurdles", according to a World Bank report, which stated that protecting Indigenous land rights is crucial to addressing poverty and conflict.

Tensions over ancestral land use have ensued over natural disasters, renewable energy projects, mining, and forced relocation.

=== Land grabbing ===
In 2011, Aberlin and Umay Aetas of Tarlac were being driven away from their ancestral land by the Philippine government to make way for the Balog-Balog mega-dam project.

In July 2013, Aeta communities held rallies to protest harassment, militarization, and land grabbing by the government in favor of mining projects on Aeta ancestral lands.

Phase one of New Clark City, where the Philippine government built a sports complex worth ₱9.5 billion for the SEA Games, covers 9,450 hectares of land and displaced more than 27,500 Aetas. Some families were given a week to vacate their homes in 2019 before the start of the SEA Games. In 2019, the Bases Conversion and Development Authority (BCDA), citing the absence of a CADT, ordered the eviction of over 500 Aeta families for the expansion of New Clark City. In December 2019, Senator Risa Hontiveros filed a Senate resolution to investigate the eviction, stating "There is a need to ensure the protection of Aetas and other indigenous communities from unjust expulsion from a land that has served as their home and have tilled since time immemorial".

In July 2026, 3,000 Aetas and farmers marched in protest over land that the Philippine Air Force uses for military exercises.

In August 2026, Aetas and farmers started a petition objecting to the Pax Silica initiative being pushed by the BCDA, raising issues of potential displacement, environmental degradation, and negative effects to farmers' livelihoods.

=== Environment ===
Mountain ranges included in the Pinatubo Aetas' Ancestral Domain Claim are centers of plant diversity and endemism.

In 2019, the Subic Zambales local government allowed the dumping of garbage in forests on Aeta ancestral lands. Following complaints from Aeta communities, the Department of Environment and Natural Resources shut down the waste facility in 2026 and ordered the local government to rehabilitate the area.

=== Tourism ===
In April 2025, Aeta communities held a protest, calling attention to their exclusion from revenues from tourism on Mount Pinatubo. The protesters said that their calls for the NCIP to address the issue had been ignored. Indigenous rights activist Beverly Longid of KATRIBU said that the NCIP has a history of neglecting the Aeta indigenous peoples. Longid stated that there is a need to recognize "the Aeta and their rights over their ancestral land and territory".

== Lifestyle ==
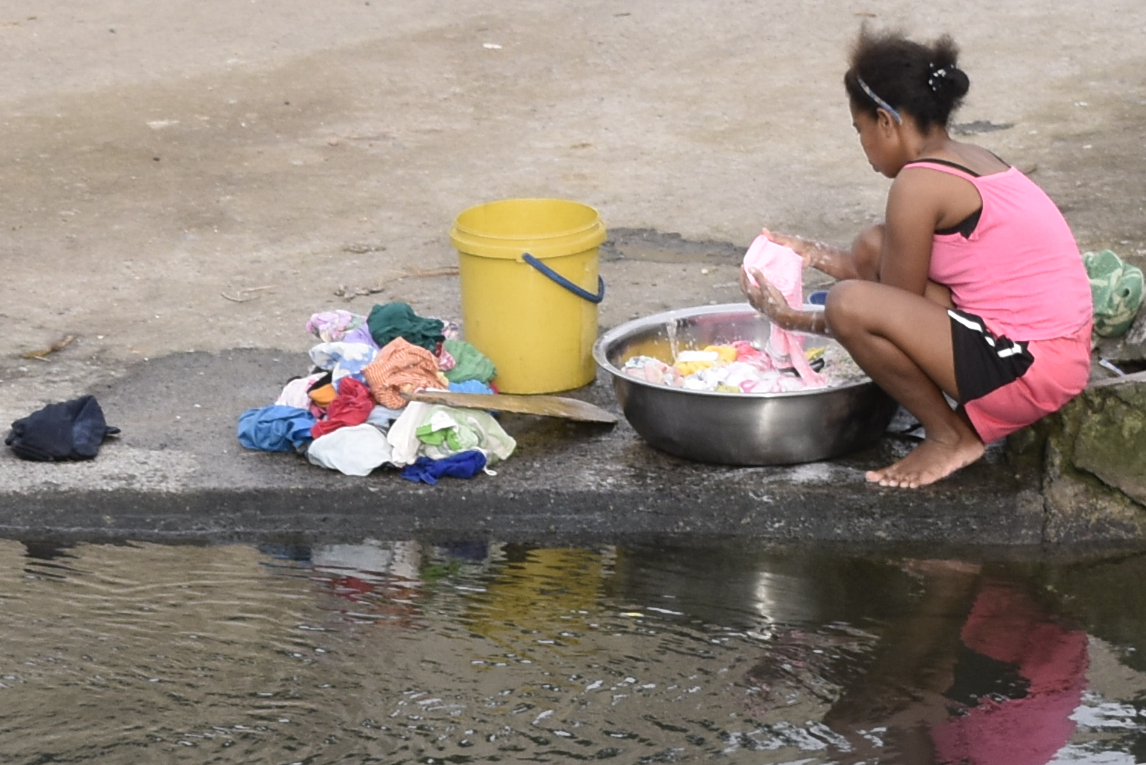
An Aeta woman washing clothes in Iriga.

The Aeta are nomadic and build only temporary shelters made of sticks driven to the ground and covered with the palm of banana leaves. The more modernized Aetas have moved to villages and areas of cleared mountains. They live in houses made of bamboo and cogon grass.

Mining, deforestation, illegal logging, and slash-and-burn farming have caused the indigenous population in the country to steadily decrease to the point where they number only in the thousands today. The Philippine government affords them little or no protection, and the Aeta have become extremely nomadic due to social and economic strain on their culture and way of life that had previously remained unchanged for thousands of years.

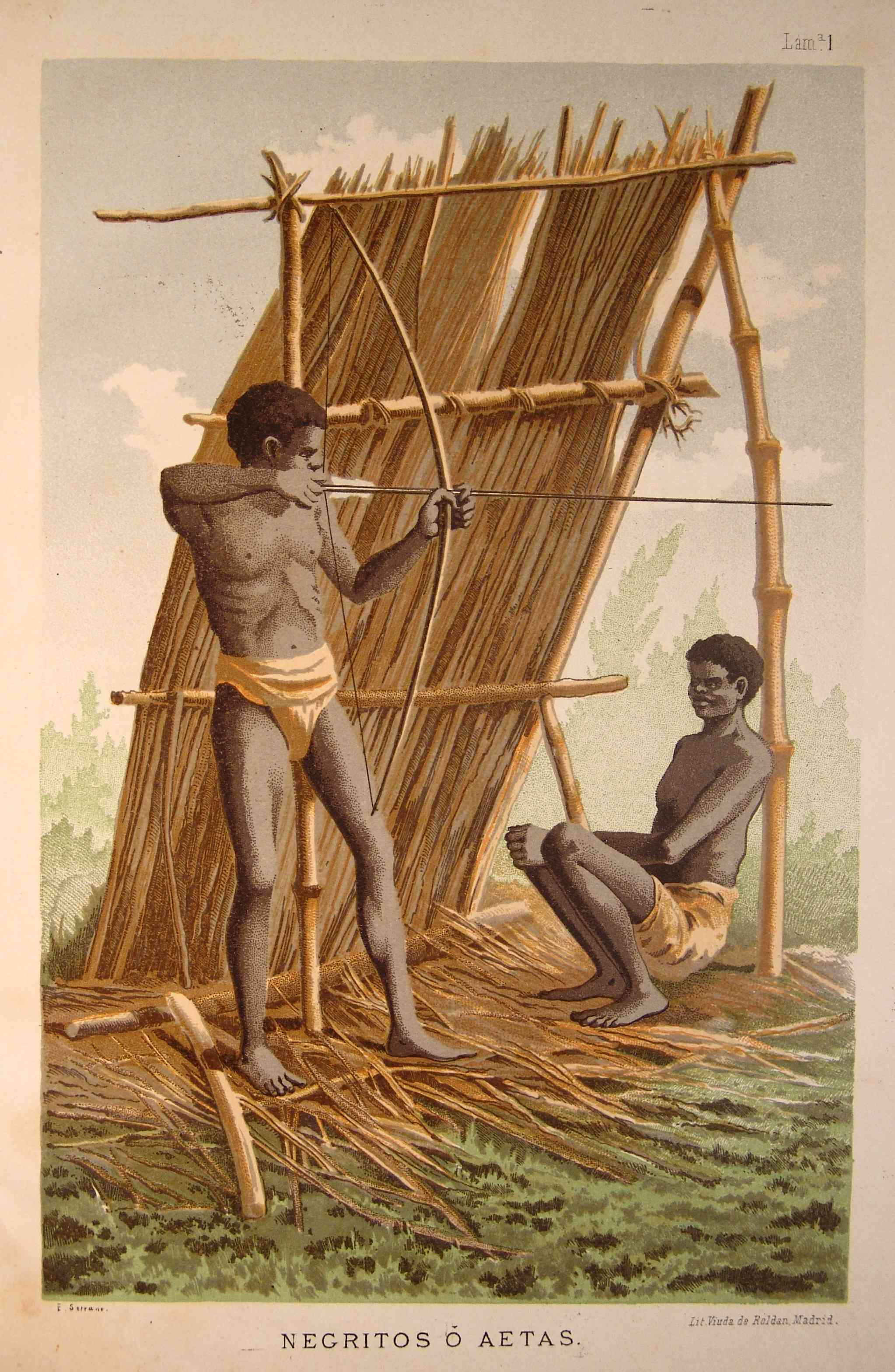
An artist's illustration of Aetas in 1885.

As hunter-gatherers, adaptation plays an important role in Aeta communities to survive. This often includes gaining knowledge about the tropical forest that they live in, the typhoon cycles that travel through their area, and other seasonal weather changes that affect the behavior of the flora and fauna in their location. Another important survival skill is storytelling. Like many other hunter-gatherer societies, the Aeta promote social values, such as cooperation, through stories. Thus, they highly value skilled storytellers.

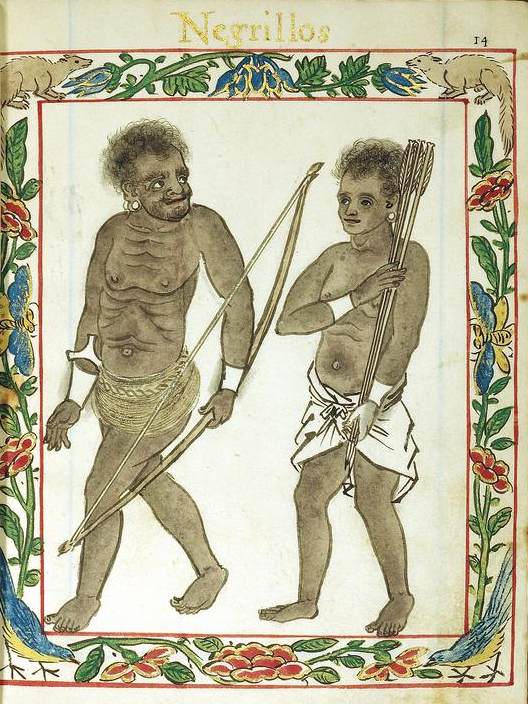
Aeta hunters, as depicted in the Boxer Codex (c. 1595).

Dry season for many Aeta communities means intense work. They not only hunt and fish more, the start of the dry season also means swiddening the land for future harvest. While the clearing of land is done by both men and women, Aeta women tend to do most of the harvesting. During this period, they also do business transactions with non-Aeta communities living around the vicinity they temporarily settled in either to sell the food they gathered, or to work as temporary farmers or field laborers. Aeta women play more active roles in business transactions with non-Aeta communities, mostly as traders and agricultural workers for lowland farmers. While dry season typically means bountiful food for Aetas, rainy season (which often falls in the Philippines between September and December) often provides the opposite experience, considering the difficulties of traversing flooded and wet forests for hunting and gathering.

Aeta communities use different tools in their hunting and gathering activities. Traditional tools include traps, knives, and bow and arrow, with different types of arrow points for specialized purposes. Most Aetas are trained for hunting and gathering at age 15, including Aeta women. While men and some women typically use the standard bow and arrow, most Aeta women prefer knives and often hunt with their dogs and in groups to increase efficiency and for social reasons. Fishing and food gathering are also done by both males and females. In terms of gender, then, Aeta communities are more egalitarian in structure and in practice.

== Language ==
All Aeta communities have adopted the language of their Austronesian Filipino neighbors, which have sometimes diverged over time to become different languages. These include, in order of number of speakers, Mag-indi, Mag-antsi, Abellen, Ambala, and Mariveleño. The second languages they speak are Kapampangan, Ilocano, and Tagalog; Kapampangan in Central Luzon, Ilocano in Cagayan Valley and northern areas of Central Luzon, and Tagalog in Central Luzon, Southern Tagalog, and other areas of Luzon.

== Religion ==
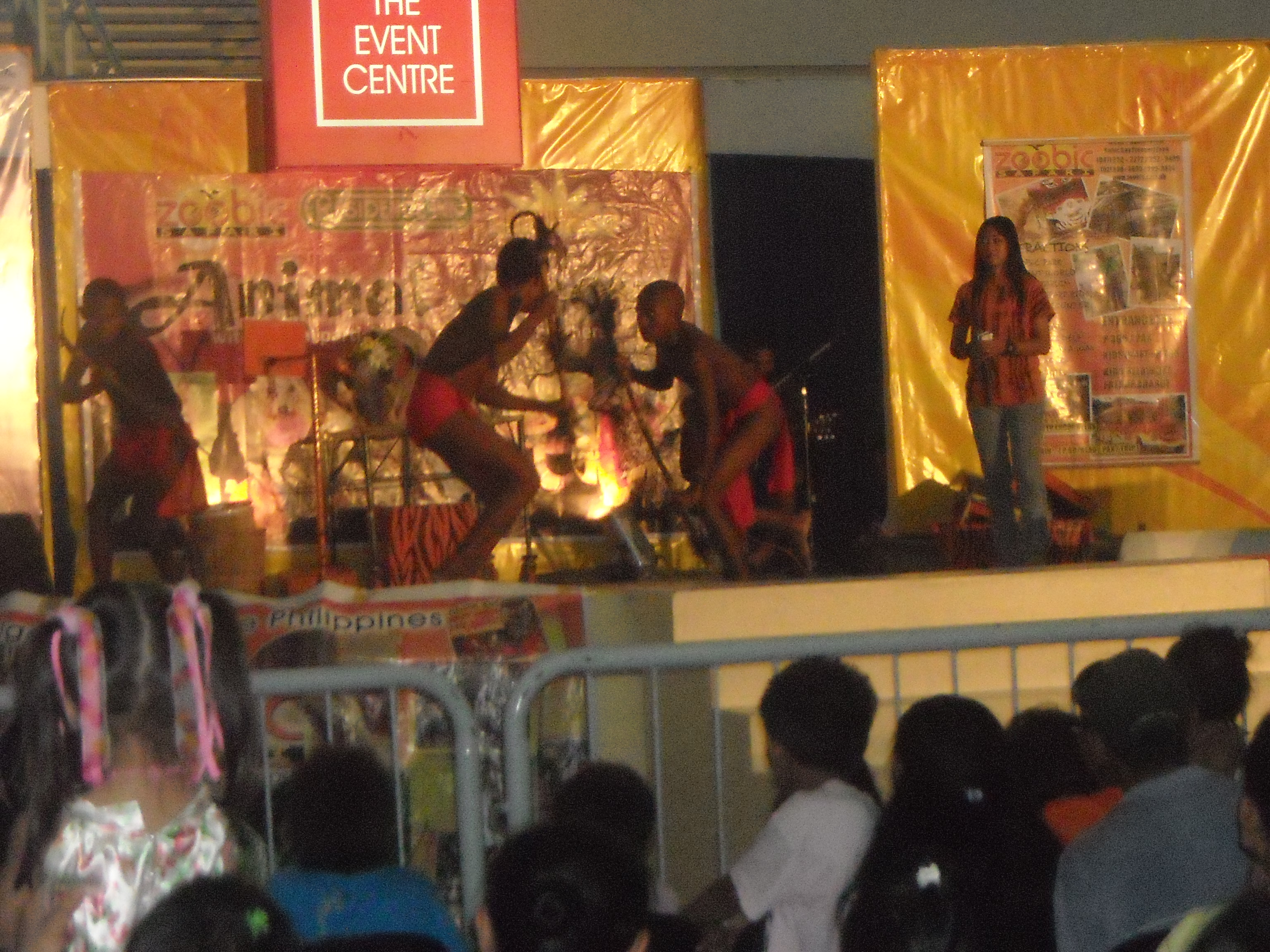
Aetas performing on stage at a shopping center.

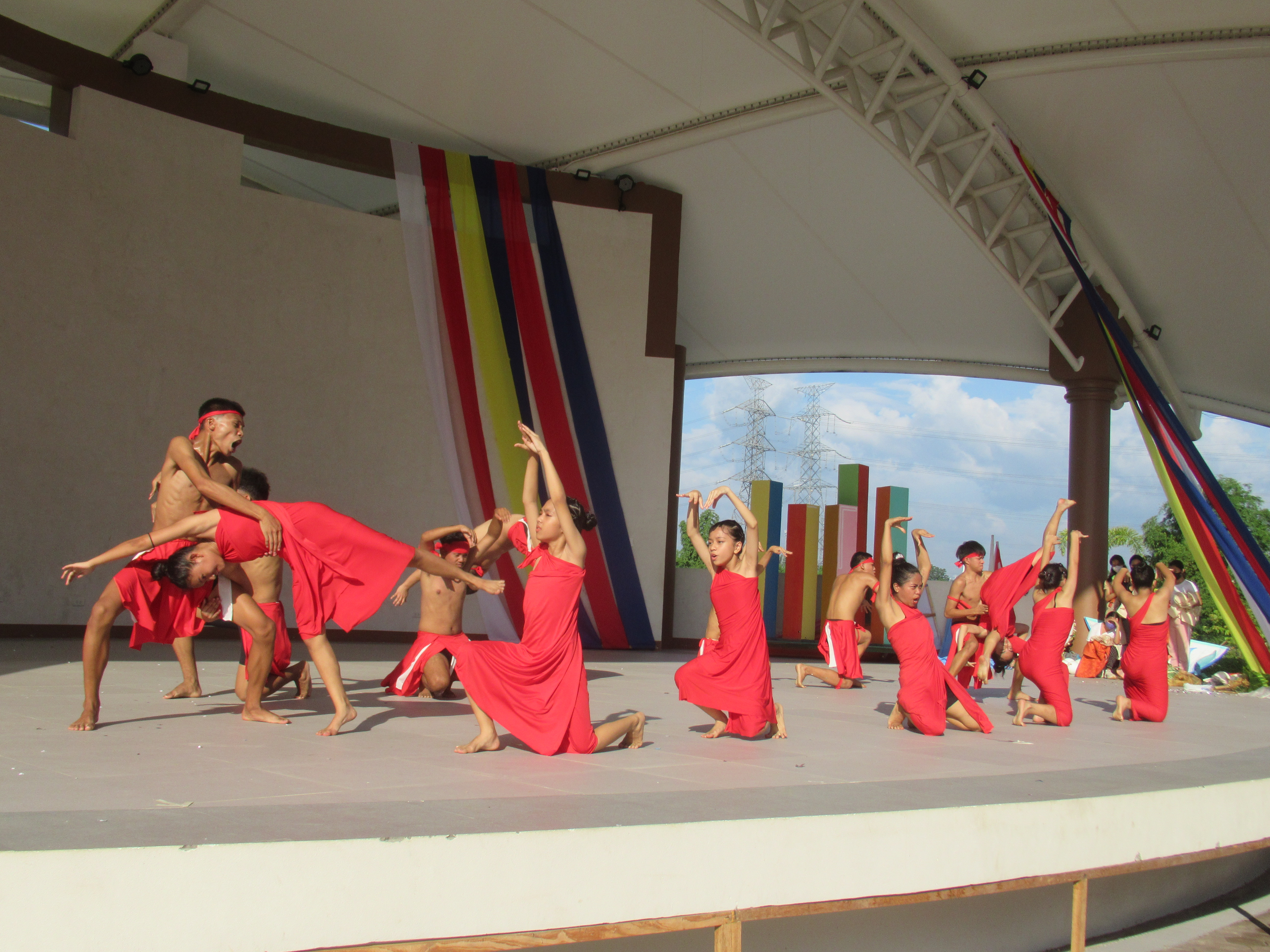
A Dumagat rain dance in San Jose del Monte, 2023.

=== Indigenous monotheistic religion ===
There are different views on the dominant character of the Aeta religion. Those who believe they are monotheistic argue that various Aeta tribes believe in a supreme being who rules over lesser spirits or deities, with the Aeta of Mt. Pinatubo worshipping "Apo Namalyari". The Aetas are also animists. For example, the Pinatubo Aeta believe in environmental spirits. They believe that good and evil spirits inhabit the environment, such as the spirits of the river, sea, sky, mountain, hill, valley and other places. Kamana the forest spirit appears and disappears providing solace and hope during difficult times.

No special occasion is needed for the Aeta to pray, but there is a clear link between prayer and economic activities. The Aeta dance before and after a pig hunt. The night before Aeta women gather shellfish, they perform a dance which is partly an apology to the fish and partly a charm to ensure the catch. Similarly, the men hold a bee dance before and after the expeditions for honey.

=== Indigenous polytheistic religion ===
There are four manifestations of the "great creator" who rules the world: Tigbalog is the source of life and action; Lueve takes care of production and growth; Amas moves people to pity, love, unity, and peace of heart; while Binangewan is responsible for change, sickness, and death.

- Gutugutumakkan – The Supreme Being and Great Creator who have four manifestations, namely, Tigbalog, Lueve, Amas, and Binangewan.
- Kedes – The god of the hunt.
- Pawi – The god of the forest.
- Sedsed – The god of the sea.
- Apo Namalyari -- The God of Creation. (Ayta Mag-Antsi)
- Bapan Namalyari -- The God of Creation. (Ayta Mag-Indi)

=== Christianity ===
In the mid-1960s, missionaries of the American-based Evangelical Protestant mission group New Tribes Mission, in their effort to reach every Philippine tribal group with the Christian Gospel, reached out to the Agtas/Aetas. The mission agency provided education, including pastoral training for natives to reach members of their own tribe. Today, a large percentage of Agtas/Aetas of Zambales and Pampanga are Evangelicals. Jehovah's Witnesses also have members among the Aeta people. (See 1993 Yearbook of Jehovah's Witnesses)

== Clothing ==
Their traditional clothing is very plain. The young women wear wrap around skirts. Elder women wear bark cloth, while elder men wear loin cloths. The old women of the Agta wear a bark cloth strip which passes between the legs, and is attached to a string around the waist. Today, most Aeta who have been in contact with lowlanders have adopted the T-shirts, pants and rubber sandals commonly used by the latter.

== Practices ==
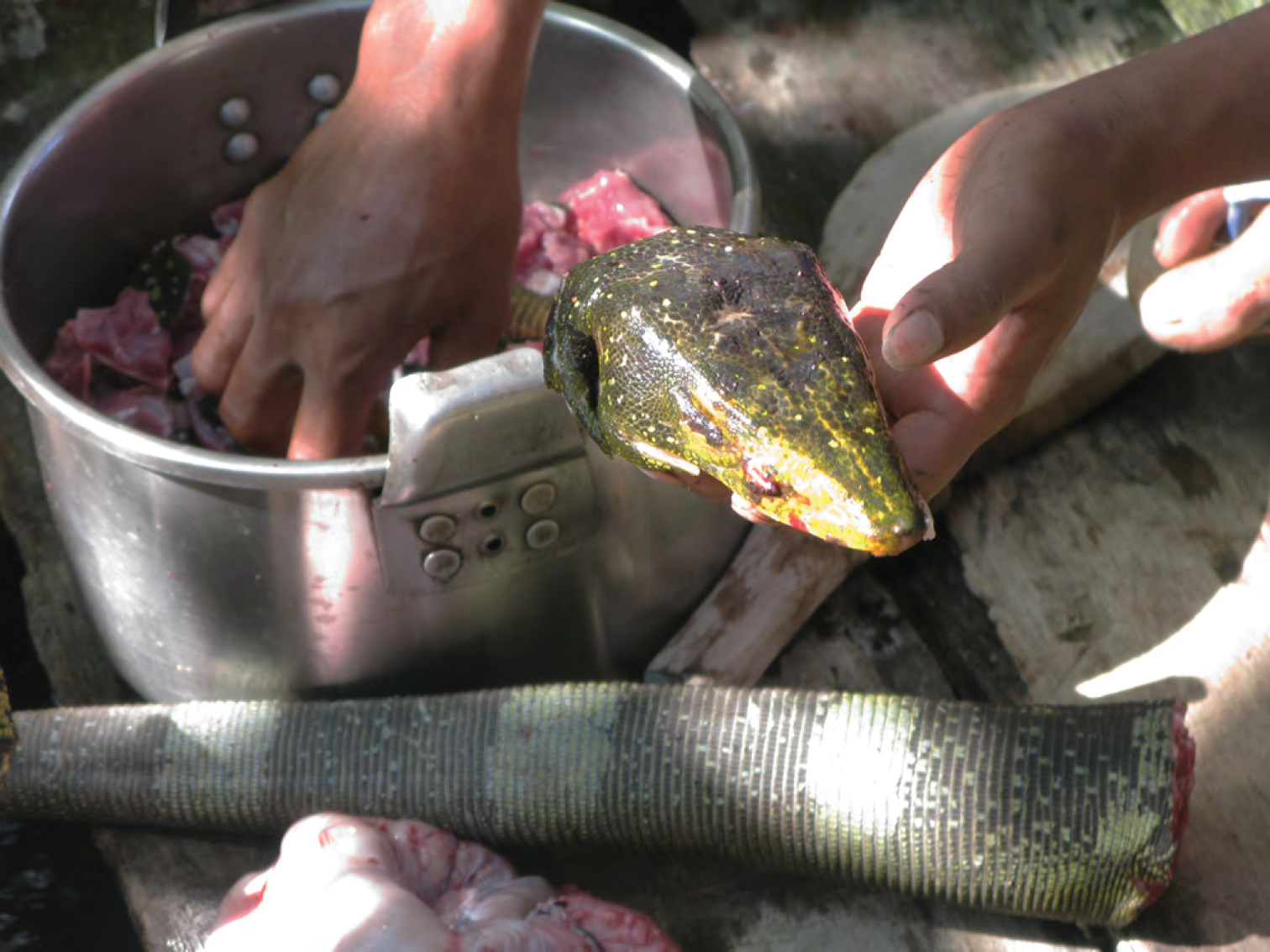
Varanus bitatawa stew being prepared by Aeta tribesmen.

The Aetas are skillful in weaving and plaiting. Women exclusively weave winnows and mats. Only men make armlets. They also produce raincoats made of palm leaves whose bases surround the neck of the wearer, and whose topmost part spreads like a fan all around the body.

According to one study, "About 85% of Philippine Aeta women hunt, and they hunt the same quarry as men. Aeta women hunt in groups and with dogs, and have a 31% success rate as opposed to 17% for men. Their rates are even better when they combine forces with men: mixed hunting groups have a full 41% success rate among the Aeta."

== Medicine ==
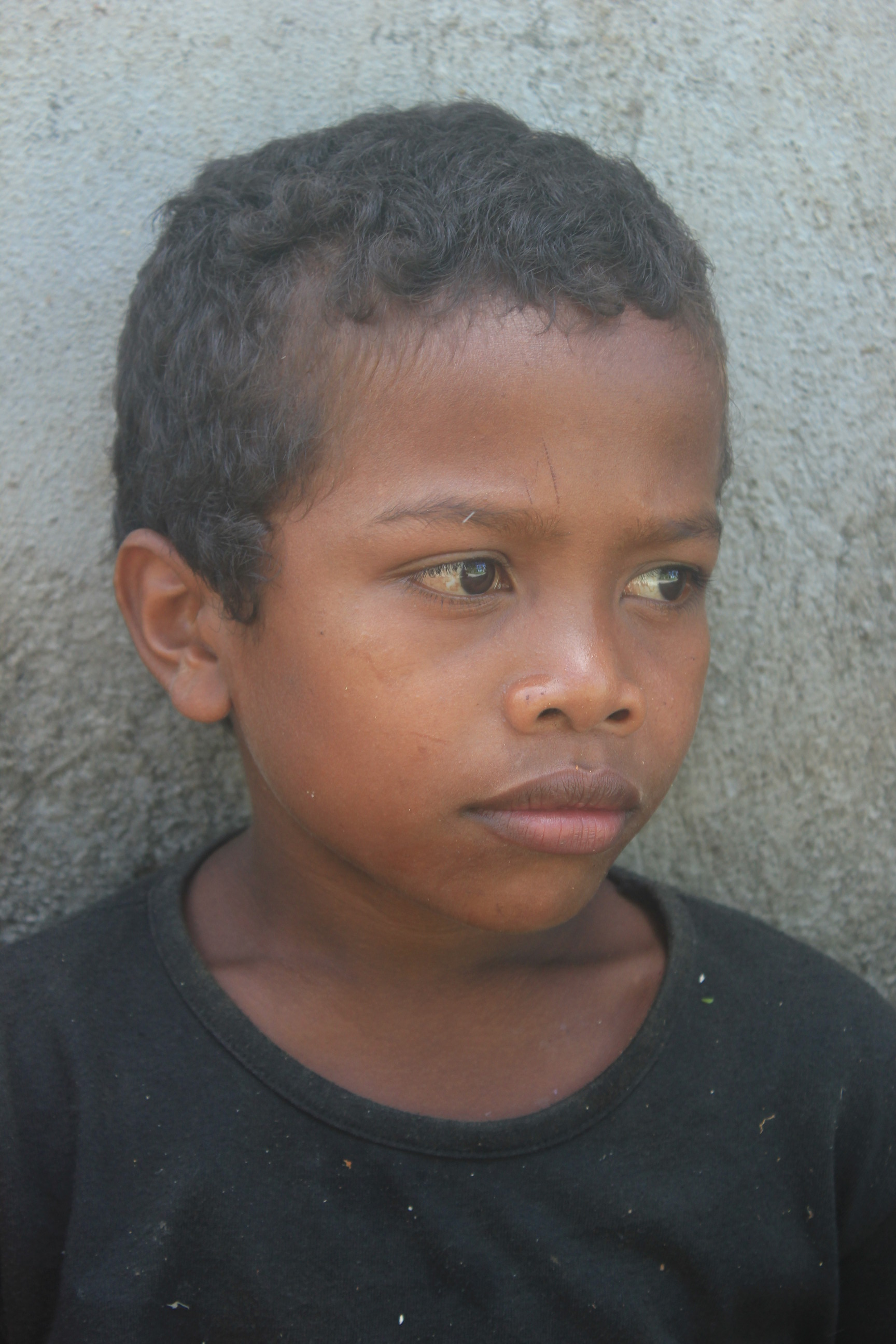
Young Aeta boy from Iriga City, Camarines Sur, in 2015.

Aeta women are known around the country as experts of the herbal medicines.

Among the Aeta community in Ilagan, Isabela for example, banana leaves are used to cure toothache. They also bathe themselves with cooled-down water boiled with camphor leaves (subusob) to help alleviate fever, or they make herbal teas out of the camphor leaves that they then drink thrice a day if the fever and cold still persist. For muscle pains, they drink herbal teas extracted from kalulong leaves and have the patient take it thrice a day. In order to prevent relapse after giving birth, women also bathe themselves in cooled-down water boiled with sahagubit roots. The drinking of sahagubit herbal tea is likewise recommended to deworm Aeta children, or generally to alleviate stomachache. For birth control purposes, Aeta women drink wine made out of lukban (pomelo) root. They are, however, not advised to drink herbal tea from makahiya extract even if it's also used to elevate stomachache problems due to the belief that it will cause abortion. The idea behind this is that like the closing of makahiya leaves once touched, the womb may also close once the makahiya touches it. The Aeta in Isabela also recommend drinking herbal tea out of wormwood (herbaca) leaves or stem to address women's irregular menstrual cycle. They take herbal teas from lemon grass (barbaraniw) extract thrice a day to normalize blood pressure.

If the illness persists even after continuous drinking of recommended herbal medicine, that's when they seek the help of an herbolario (herbalist or folk healer). They do so because the Aeta believe that their illnesses are caused by a spirit that they may have offended, in which case herbal medicines or medical doctors won't be able to address. In order to appease the spirits, they ask the herbolario to perform a ritual called ud- udung. In this ritual, the herbolario places rice or raw eggs on the patient's forehead first to determine what causes the illness and repeats this several times to confirm. After the herbolario is satisfied, the patient will be asked to bathe with ricewash, and then to offer food to appease the offended spirit.

The Aeta communities take pride in their use of herbal medicines and their own natural ways of curing the sick. Finding their main source of herbal medicines in their habitat rather than buying costly medicines, emphasizing the mutual relationship with the nature, also has a great attitudinal impact pertaining to sustainability approach and practices in healthcare. A study by the Museum of Natural History at the University of the Philippines in Los Baños in 2010 identified 93 plant species with medicinal properties used by Aeta communities in Quezon Province.

Indigenous Aeta healers are called sometimes called "mang-aanito".

== Art ==
A traditional form of visual art is body scarification. The Aetas intentionally wound the skin on their back, arms, breast, legs, hands, calves and abdomen, and then they irritate the wounds with fire, lime and other means to form scars.

Other "decorative disfigurements" include the chipping of the teeth. With the use of a file, the Dumagat modify their teeth during late puberty. The teeth are dyed black a few years afterwards.

The Aetas generally use ornaments typical of people living in subsistence economies. Flowers and leaves are used as earplugs for certain occasions. Girdles, necklaces, and neckbands of braided rattan incorporated with wild pig bristles are frequently worn.

== Music ==
The Aeta have a musical heritage consisting of various types of agung ensembles, ensembles composed of large hanging, suspended or held, bossed/knobbed gongs, which act as drone, without any accompanying melodic instrument.

== Traditional political organization ==
While the father is normally the figurehead of the family, Aeta communities or bands traditionally had an anarchic political structure wherein they don't have appointed chiefs to exercise authority over them. Individual Aeta is on equal grounds with the other and their main course of social interaction is through their tradition. It's also the tradition, and not constituted laws, that maintain the equality among them and guide their way of life. They do have groups of elders in their community, called pisen, who they tend to go to when it comes to arbitrating decisions. However, the decisions made by the elders only remain in advisory capacity and no one could force any individual to follow those decisions. Their guiding principle and conflict resolution is through a sustained deliberation.

Over time, this egalitarian political structure was disturbed due to recurring contacts with the lowland Filipinos wherein the local officials and individuals they interact with forced Aeta communities to create government structure resembling those in the lowlands. At times, Aeta communities do organize themselves in government-like system with a Capitan (Captain), Conseyal (Council) and Policia (Police). But mostly, they resist such imposed organization. In particular, they refuse to appoint a chief (or a president) that will govern them although they do have one elder that takes the responsibility of leadership. This informal kind of government can also be found in their judicial process. When someone in their community did something wrong, they would deliberate about it, but more importantly, they do not talk about what kind of punishment they will hand to the wrong-doer. Instead, the deliberation is about understanding the motivation behind the action and prevent the consequence of the action from developing into something worse. Young men and women are excluded from the deliberation process. In this particular case, women are also largely excluded from the deliberation process even when they are allowed to attend the hearing or even when sometimes they can make their opinion about the problem. For the most part, women are not given room within the decision-making process because the Aeta communities also follow a strict gender role where women are mostly expected take care of the children and the husband.

== See also ==
- Buno
- Semang
- Norman King, first Aeta graduate of the University of the Philippines Manila
