= Radical Youth League =

Organization of the Communist Party of India

- Formation: 1977
- Dissolved: 2012
- Location: Andhra Pradesh

The Radical Youth League (RYL) was a frontal organisation of the Communist Party of India (Maoist), a Naxalite group, mainly operating in Andhra Pradesh.

== History ==
The Radical Students Union (RSU) was formed in 1974, and the Radical Youth League (RYL) in 1977. Radical Youth League units were established by revolutionaries in Andhra Pradesh in 1978 during their "Go To Village" campaigns to propagate agrarian revolution. They were banned in Andhra Pradesh, but in 2004 the state government lifted the ban to allow for peace talks. While talks were underway the People's War Group (PWG) merged with Maoist Communist Centre (MCC) to form the Communist Party of India (Maoist). The Naxalites suffered a serious setback in 2005.

On 17 August 2005 a ban was re-imposed on the Communist Party of India (Maoist) and its frontal organisations including the Radical Youth League and the All India Revolutionary Students Federation after Congress legislator C. Narsi Reddy was killed. Bans were repeatedly reimposed, one year at a time. In August 2006 the ban was extended for a year. In August 2009 the Andhra Pradesh government extended the ban for another year. In August 2011 the ban was again extended for another year. In November 2011 it was reported that the Maoists were planning to revive the RYL and other frontal groups in Andhra Pradesh, first in forest areas and later in the plains. Tribal students would be mobilised using the issues of corruption, poor school facilities, lack of teachers and lack of job opportunities.

== Incidents ==
On 10 January 2000 a Telecom Department engineer was killed by police in Dharmapuri district. He had allegedly joined the Radical Youth League and become an extremist. His widow protested that the "encounter" was fake. In March 2012 the Madras High Court ordered a probe by the Central Bureau of Investigation into the event, saying there was prima facie evidence that the police had violated the law.

The RYL was not banned in the state of Tamil Nadu but the Tamil Nadu police targeted the organisation. On 24 November 2002 the police arrested twenty six people in the Dharmapuri district of Tamil Nadu, and on 10 January 2003 they were placed under POTA by the government on the grounds that they were members of the Radical Youth League. On 26 August 2004, still being held without trial, the detainees began a hunger strike. The former judge Rajinder Sachar led a team of human rights activists who visited them in jail on 15 September 2004 and persuaded them to end the hunger strike. As in May 2005 they had still not been released.

In February 2012 "Q" branch officials arrested a core committee member of the Radical Youth League named Manivasagam along with 25 other Naxalites. Manivasagam had been arrested in 2002 as a courier for the organisation, appeared for trial in 2008 and then escaped.
