= Barak state movement =

Movement for proposed separate Barak state in India

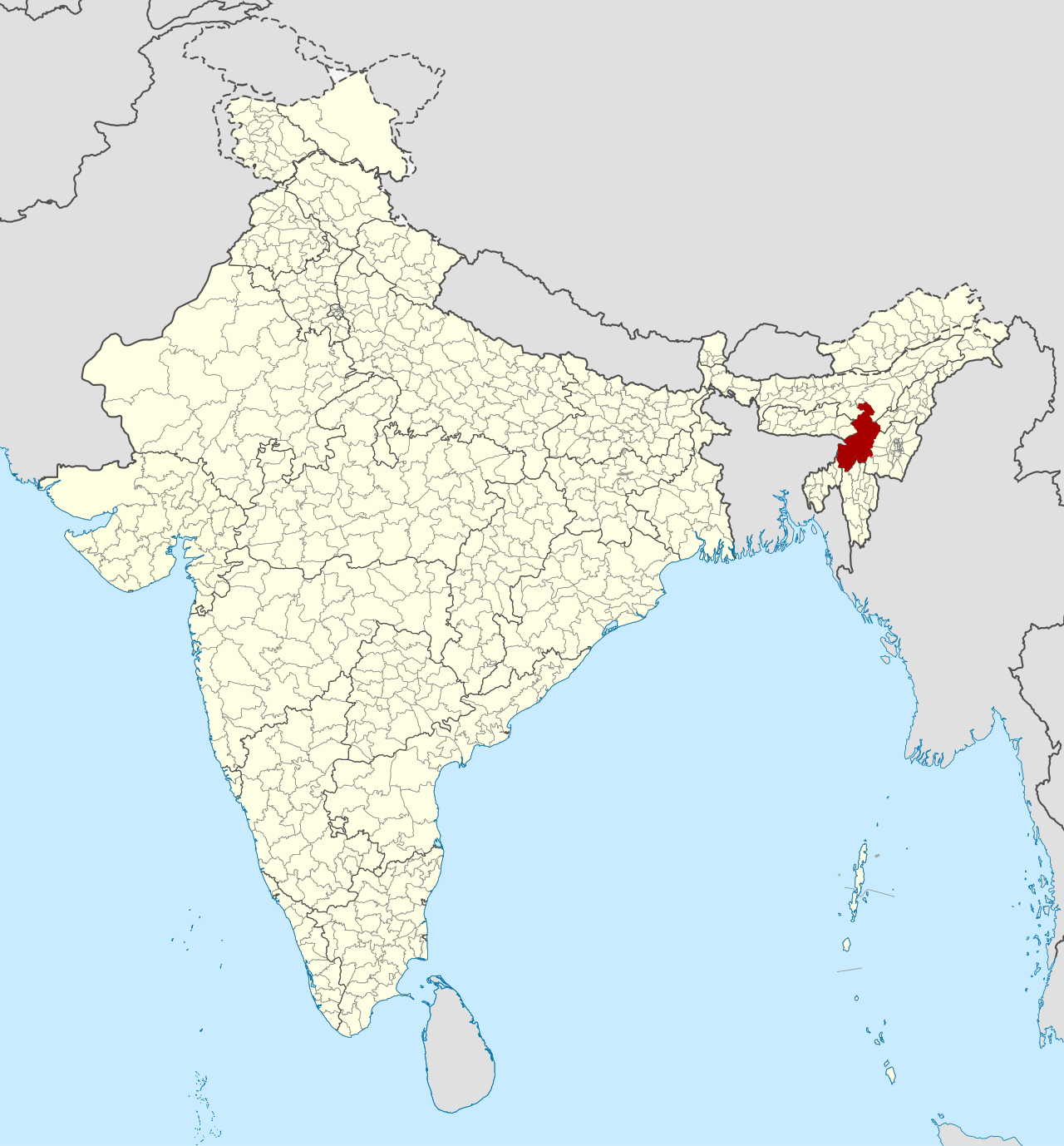
Map of India with the districts of Cachar, Hailakandi, Karimganj, Dima Hasao, Hojai (minus Doboka) and Jiribam highlighted in dark red.

The Barak state movement includes socio-political activities organised by various individuals, organizations and political parties, for the creation of a separate state within the Republic of India, consisting of the areas of the present state of Assam that fall within the Barak River's drainage basin (in contrast with the rest of the state, that falls within the Brahmaputra's drainage basin), in a unique geographical-cultural area known as the Barak Valley. The proposed state corresponds roughly to Assam's 3 southern districts of Cachar, Hailakandi and Karimganj, as well as parts of Dima Hasao. Some more maximalist definitions seek to include, in whole or in part, the Bengali-majority district of Hojai (which would require the integration of the entirety of Dima Hasao for the sake of territorial continuity) and possibly Jiribam district in Manipur. The area is covered by thick tropical forests and has natural resources like tea, oil, natural gas and jute.

== Statehood demand ==
The strongest call for separation was heard in the Valley since the famous Bengali language movement of 1960s, where 11 ethnic Bengalis died to protect Bengali language and culture in the valley. In 1954, for instance, the Cachar States Reorganisation Committee have decided to submit a memorandum to the States Reorganisation Commission for the creation of new state of Purbachal. A memorandum was then submitted to the States Reorganisation Commission of India in the year of 1955. However, in the same year, the State Reorganization Commission in a report have concluded that the idea of a separate state did not have much merit because at that time its natural resources were not adequate, the population of Barak Valley was very less to meet requirements of separate statehood and the total area was also less than the neighbouring erstwhile districts of Assam such as – 1. Naga Hills, 2. Khasi Hills, Jaintia Hills and Garo Hills, 3. North-East Frontier Agency, 4. Lushai Hills which later have been carved out as separate states under North-Eastern Areas (Reorganisation) Acts of 1971 and 1987 respectively.

=== Present scenario ===
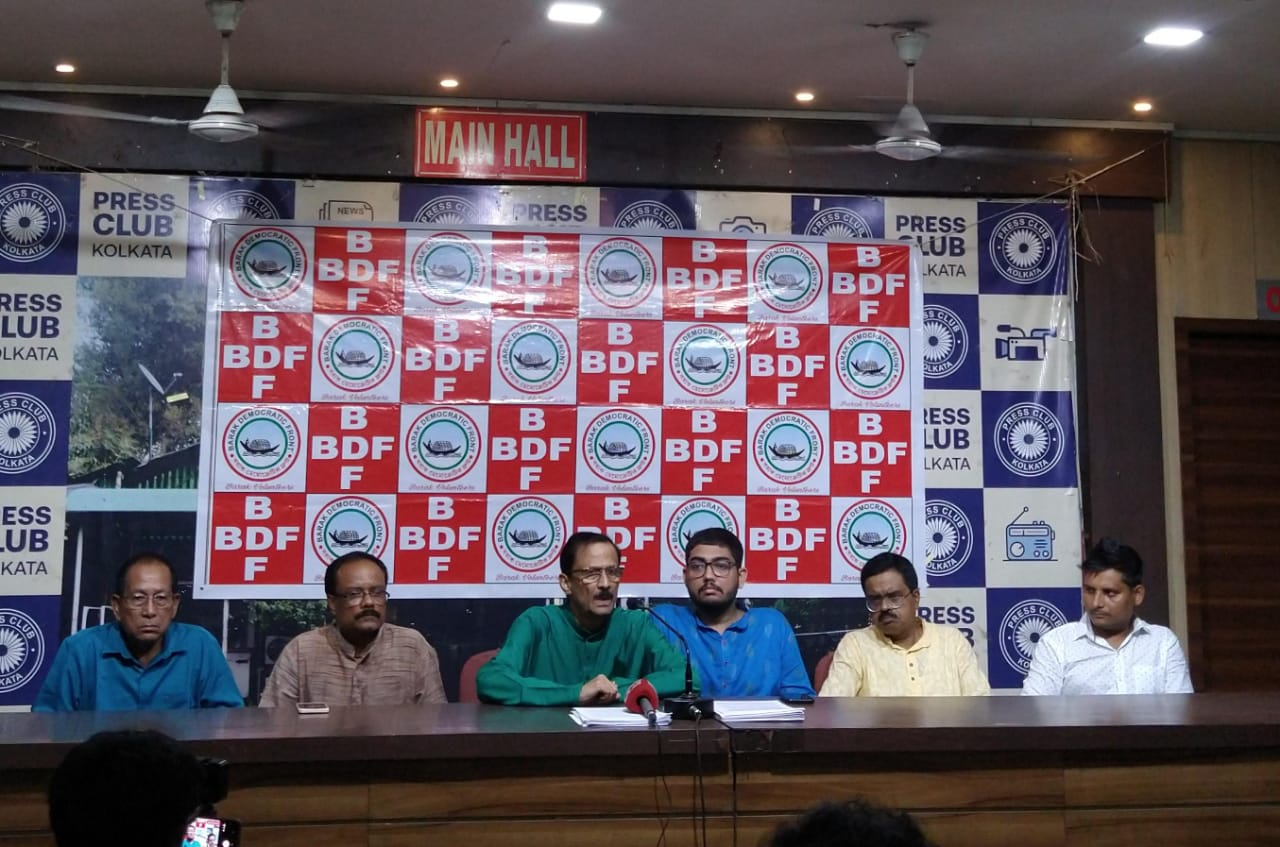
Members of Barak Democratic Front holding a press conference at Kolkata Press Club on the issue of Separate Barak state, (27.09.23).

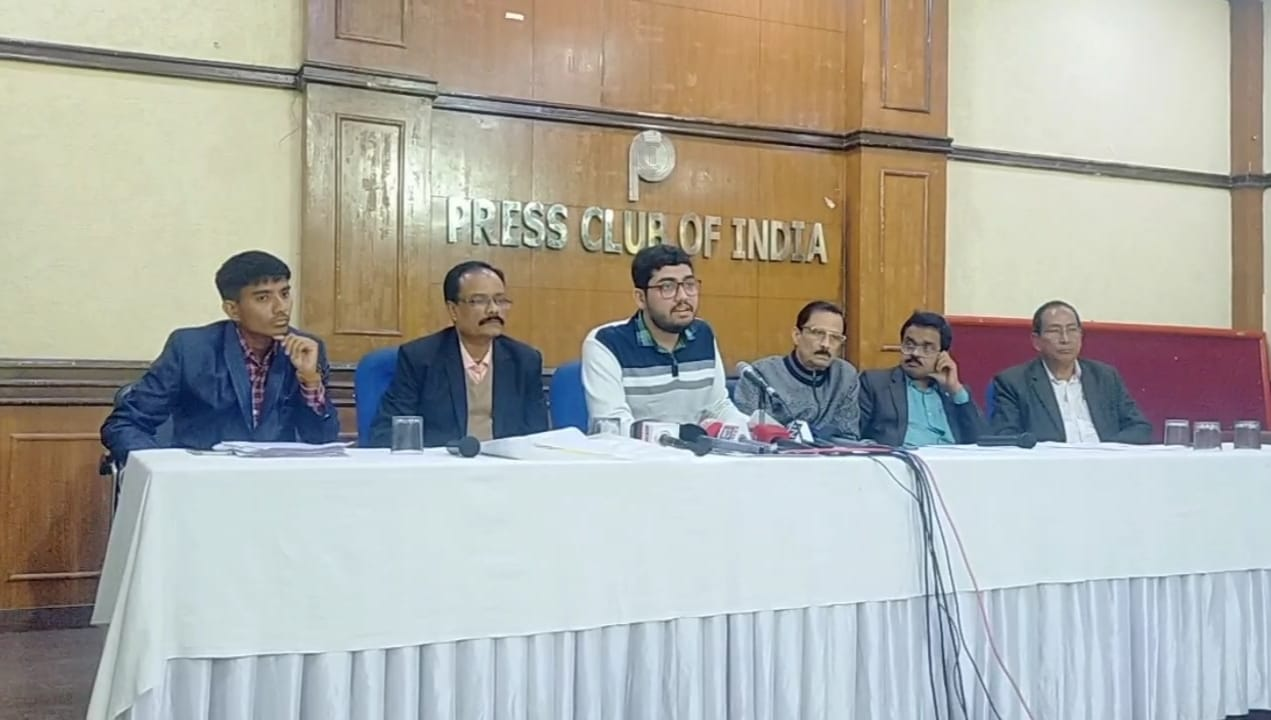
Members of Barak Democratic Front holding a press conference at the Press Club of India, on the issue of Separate Barak state, (29/11/23).

The movement for Separate statehood demand has been carried out by Barak Democratic Front Chief Convenor Mr. Pradip Dutta Roy, who is also the founding President of "All Cachar Karimganj Hailakandi Students Association", (ACKHSA) in the Valley. Another Organisation named – "Union Territory Demand Committee" (UTDC) has been demanding separate Union Territory status for the Valley since 1960s. On September 7, 2023, Assam Chief Minister Himanta Biswa Sarma delivered a speech at a rally in Silchar and asserted that "If the people of Barak Valley want separation, I will not oppose that demand." However, he concluded by reaffirming the prevailing sentiment he encounters during his visits to Barak Valley, stating, "Whenever I come, people of Barak Valley tell me that they want to remain a part of Assam and not listen to supporters of separate Barak." The BDF subsequently conducted a press conference on September 8, 2023, and congratulated the Chief Minister for providing implicit support to the separation call. On September 27, 2023, members of Barak Democratic Front (BDF) held a press conference at the Kolkata Press Club shedding light on the long-standing grievances of Barak Valley residents while attempting to garner support for the creation of a new state named Purbachal, separate from Assam. On 29 November 2023, the demand for separate Barak state have been raised before the office of Prime Minister and Home Minister and a memorandum was also submitted by the members of Barak Democratic Front in Indian Parliament.

On 26 December 2023, billboards in various localities of Silchar have been set up by Barak Democratic Front (BDF), conveying messages like why there is a need for Barak Valley to become a Separate state and the Separation is the only way out for Liberation, to solve all the Socio-economic and political problems existing in the Valley. The message further asserts that Barak Valley has been neglected by the state government, hindering its development and prosperity etc. and also point out Unemployment, lack of proper medical facilities as a major concern in the Valley.

On 28 December 2023, Barak Democratic Front Chief Convenor Mr. Pradeep Dutta Roy has challenged the state government with a proposal that have potentially changed the course of the movement. He asserted that "Assam Government should conduct a referendum! If 90% of people vote against separation, we'll withdraw our demand immediately".

On 2 April 2024, The Subarnakhand Rashtriya Samiti, another organization in the Valley have advocated for the establishment of a separate Barak Valley state to be carved out of Assam. The Former president of the Samiti and legal practitioner, Mr. Nazrul Islam Laskar, have highlighted the prolonged consideration of the discourse surrounding the creation of a new state in the Barak Valley. He underscored the transformative potential of statehood, emphasizing its capacity to facilitate comprehensive development, beginning with citizenship rights, and effectively addressing the diverse issues faced by the Valley people.

== Aim and objectives ==
Struggle for existence, safeguard and welfare of the Bengali community and other ethnicities like Dimasa-Kacharis, Manipuris, Bishnupriyas, Hindi-speaking Tea tribe, Tripuris, Odias and other tribal groups living in the Barak Valley. Its main purpose is to serve the public and students interests for holistic development of education, literacy, diversity of culture, language and socio-economic, etc. Eradication of social evils such as illiteracy, poverty, underdevelopment and other prejudices existing in the Valley. Preserve historical heritage of the Valley specially – traditional fusion of Bengali-Dimasa culture of the land, historical monuments like kingdom of Khaspur, and its unique and vibrant identity etc. Demand legitimate constitutional rights and privileges for better economic well-being and growth, protection and coexistence and unity among the various sections of the people living in the Valley. The various individuals and organizations like Barak Democratic Front have demanded Economic Development Council for the same.

== Reasons for Demand ==
The Barak Valley in Assam has unfortunately been historically neglected and underprivileged when it comes to infrastructure development, the tourism sector, educational institutions, healthcare facilities, IT industries, GDP (Gross Domestic Product), HDI (Human Development Index), and more. In comparison to the Assam mainland's Brahmaputra Valley, which enjoys access to these amenities, the Barak Valley lags significantly behind. This disparity has resulted in a troubling trend of brain drain among the younger generation in the Barak Valley. Many talented youths have chosen to leave the region due to its underdevelopment, and unfortunately, a substantial number of them have not returned. This has implications for the region's future development and growth as it struggles to retain its young, skilled workforce. Efforts to bridge this gap and invest in the development of the Barak Valley are essential to address these disparities.

As compared to rest of Assam, the unemployment rate in Barak Valley is also high and is one of the main reasons behind the massive migration of its youth to other parts of India in search of livelihood. Barak Valley job applicants in grade III and IV recruitment are victims of severe discrimination. On 18 November 2022, a Bandh was organized by Barak Democratic Front in protest against the deprivation of unemployed youths of the valley in the Class III and IV job recruitment process. But nothing have been solved by the state government till now and job deprivation continues.

"On 27th April 2007 and 16th May 2015, the Cachar Sugar Mill and Cachar Paper Mill, the only two major Industries in Barak Valley, were closed down by the State government without any valid reasons. This closure ultimately led to severe unemployment and economic crisis in the valley, as those industries were the major contributors to GDP after agriculture."

The Poverty rate in Barak Valley is high as compared to mainland Brahmaputra Valley region of Assam. As per NITI Aayog, almost half of the population of the valley is living in dire poverty without having proper access to food, electricity and safe drinking water etc. A careful analysis of the report reveals the shocking reality. In terms of Multidimensional Poverty, the three districts of Barak Valley have featured among the poorest of districts in the state. As per report, about 51% of the Hailakandi's population, 42.37% of the Cachar's population and 46.02% of Karimganj's population are living under abject poverty. On April 2, 2020, without ration and wages for since March 24, Prime Minister of India, Mr. Narendra Modi, have announced a 21-day lockdown, where about 70 thousand tea workers of Barak Valley region in Assam have become unemployed overnight and have struggled severely to find even one proper meal a day. Barak Valley have a total 125 tea gardens, of which 104 tea gardens across the three districts of the valley have been shut down and both the "Tea Association of India" and the "Indian Tea Association" — are hoping that the government will come up with a package to help them and end this crisis. But nothing has been done by the Government of Assam till now and the deprivation continues.

On 20 June 2023, the Election Commission of India reduced the number of seats allocated to Barak Valley in the Assam Legislative Assembly from 15 to just 13 assembly constituencies. The reduction of seats has angered the people of Barak and has produced outrage against the Assam Government, as it has diminished the representation of the valley in the state assembly, going against "the concept of Democratic values and people's aspirations" respectively.

Despite being rich in natural resources, the region is poor and disputes exist over the sharing and use of natural resources with the mother state. The linguistic and cultural gap has exacerbated deep division between the two valleys, resulting in calls for separation, as Barak Valley is predominantly a Bengali-majority region of the state, while the mainland Brahmaputra Valley region is mainly Assamese-dominated with significant population being indigenous tribals and immigrants from other parts.

During the Lok Sabha elections on April 23, 2024, candidates contesting in Assam's Barak Valley constituencies of Silchar (SC) and Karimganj highlighted significant issues, including citizenship concerns, unemployment, poor infrastructure, and inadequate connectivity with the rest of the country, emphasizing the perceived neglect and lack of attention from the state government.

=== Historical perspective ===
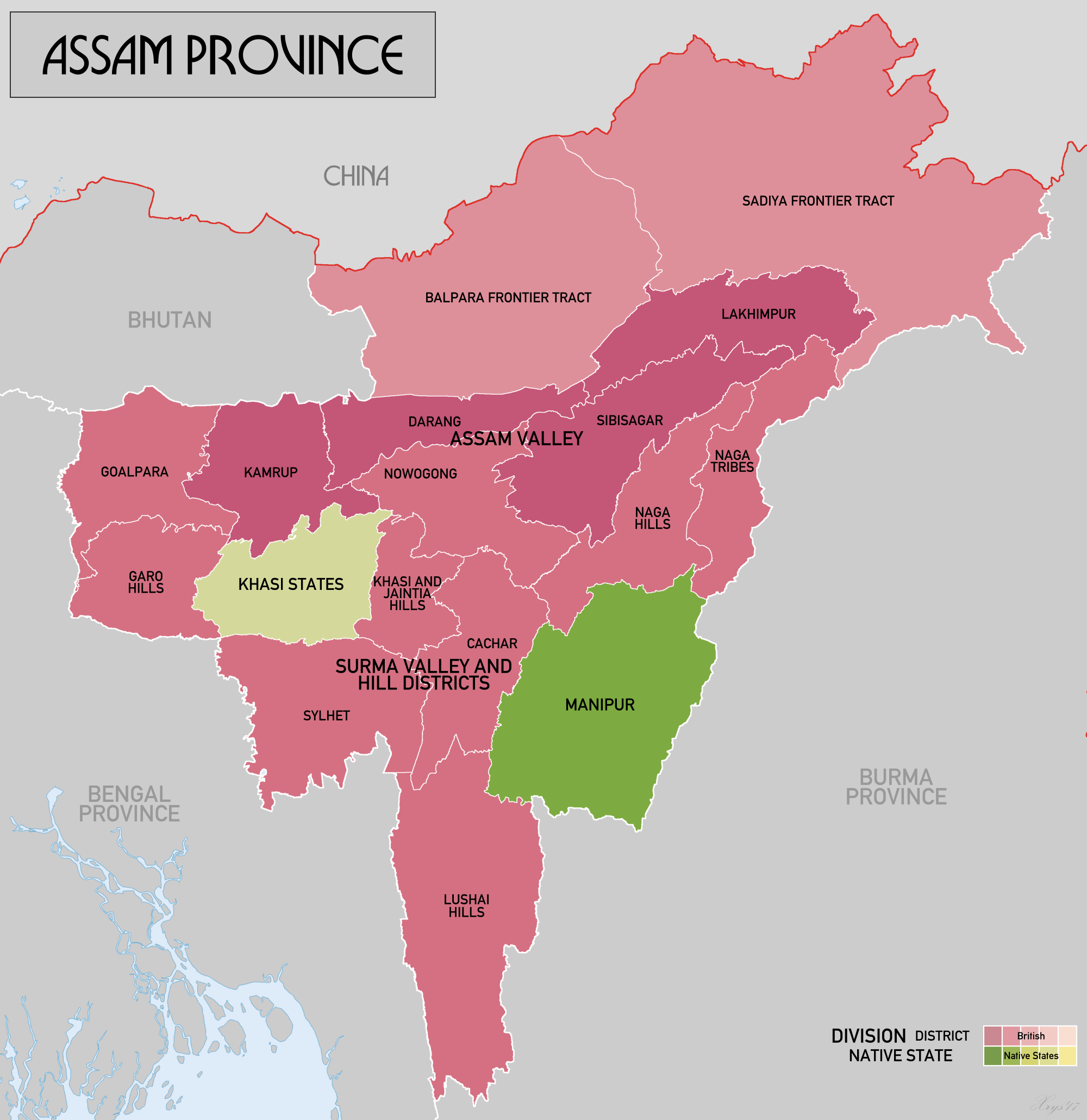
Map of Cachar Kingdom (1140-1832).

Barak Democratic Front Chief Convenor, Mr. Pradip Dutta Roy, has stated, in a historical analysis, that Barak Valley was never a part of Assam historically and was incorporated into the state, a few centuries ago by the British. From 1140 to 1832 AD, the Barak Valley region, including present Dima Hasao, was a part of the Kachari Kingdom with rulers being Dimasa Cachari, while the majority of the Kingdom's subjects were Bengalis. It remained Independent from the Ahom kingdom, which ruled the Brahmaputra Valley region of Assam for 598 years. In 1832, the Kachari Kingdom was annexed by the East India Company, and from 1832 to 1874 AD, it was made a part of the Bengal Presidency due to linguistic similarities and administrative convenience. It was only after 1874, that the plains of Undivided Cachar district was made a part of Assam Province by the British.

== See also ==
- Proposed states and union territories of India
