= Yalavarthi Naveen Babu =

Indian communist leader (1964–2000)

- Born: 29 May 1964; Guddikayalanka, Bapatla district, Andhra Pradesh, India
- Died: 18 February 2000 (aged 35); Darakonda, Andhra Pradesh, India
- Occupations: Naxalite leader, separatist
- Known for: his important book From Varna to Jati
- Criminal charge: Left-wing insurgency
- Criminal status: Killed in encounter

Yalavarthi Naveen Babu (29 May 1964 – 18 February 2000), or simply Naveen, was an Indian Naxalite leader.

Yalavarthi Naveen Babu was born on 29 May 1964 in Guddikayalanka village, Bapatla district, Andhra Pradesh, India. His family were farmers from a middle-class background. Naveen studied at Babu Jagjivan Ram College, Hyderabad, where he obtained a B.Sc. He moved to Meerut University in 1984, where he started studying for his MA in Sociology. In 1986, he transferred to Jawaharlal Nehru University, Delhi, gaining an MA in 1988 and starting to study for a PhD. The Delhi Radical Students Organisation (DRSO) was formed in 1986, and Naveen joined this group in 1988. The DRSO was part of the Radical Students Union. In 1990, Naveen represented the DRSO in the national All India Revolutionary Students Federation, and became editor of its magazine Kalam.

In the early 1990s, Naveen abandoned his studies and joined the Communist Party of India (Marxist–Leninist) as a full-time activist in the People's War Group (PWG). He quickly moved up through the ranks to the Central Committee. He took the lead in organizing an International Seminar on Nationality Struggles in Delhi in February 1996 for the All India Peoples' Revolutionary Forum. The Coordination Committee of Struggles of Nationalities and Democratic Movements was formed as a result of this seminar, bringing together revolutionaries from different South Asian countries.

Naveen was killed on 18 February 2000 in a village near Visakhapatnam, Andhra Pradesh. He died in a firefight with police. In September 2008, his MPhil dissertation was published as a book, "From Varna to Jati". The book discusses the political economy of caste, tracing the evolution of the system in economic and socio-cultural terms. It has been described as "a modest but significant interdisciplinary contribution to Indian Marxist historiography, sociology and political economy".
