= Asia Indigenous Peoples Pact =

International organisation of Indigenous Peoples in Asia

- Abbreviation: AIPP
- Formation: 1992
- Headquarters: Chiang Mai, Thailand
- Chairperson: Kittisak Rattanakrajangsri
- Website: aippnet.org

The Asia Indigenous Peoples Pact (AIPP) is a regional organization founded in 1992 by indigenous peoples' movements. AIPP promotes and defends indigenous peoples' human rights, including land rights and cultural rights. As of 2025, AIPP has 46 member organizations from 14 countries in Asia. Some members are focused on women's rights or youth. Members include the Nepal Federation of Indigenous Nationalities, Indigenous Peoples' Alliance of the Archipelago (AMAN), Ainu Peoples Council, and Naga People's Movement for Human Rights.

Most governments in Asia are signatory to the United Nations Declaration on the Rights of Indigenous Peoples, though indigenous peoples are not recognized in some countries where AIPP has members, such as Laos.

AIPP is accredited with international institutions including the United Nations Economic and Social Council, United Nations Framework Convention on Climate Change, Green Climate Fund, United Nations Environment Programme and World Intellectual Property Organization. AIPP has also coauthored research with the FAO.

== History ==
Luingam Luithui is one of the co-founder of AIPP. He was its first Secretary General for two terms, from 1992 to 2000.

== Representatives by region ==
=== Executive council ===
South Asia

- Nepal: Jagat Bahadur Baram from the Nepal Federation of Indigenous Nationalities (NEFIN)
- Mainland India: Mamta Kujur from the Adivasi Mahila Maha Sangh (AMMS)
- NE-India: Pankaj Teron from the Karbi Human Rights Watch (KHRW)
- Bangladesh: Chandra Tripura from the Bangladesh Indigenous Peoples Forum (BIPF)
- Malaysia: Maslah Rompado from the Indigenous Peoples'Network Of Malaysia (JOAS)

East Asia

- Taiwan: Su Hsin from the Papora Indigenous Development Association (PIDA)

Mekong Region:

- Burma/Myanmar: Naw Ei Ei Min from Promotion of Indigenous and Nature Together (POINT)
- Thailand: Nittaya Earkanna from the Indigenous Women's Network of Thailand (IWNT)

South East Asia

- Timor Leste: Ergilio Ferreira Vicente from the Covalima Youth Centre (CYC)
- Philippines: Beverly Longid from Katribu Kalipunan ng Katutubong Mamamayan ng Pilipinas (KATRIBU)
