= Ambedkarism =

Philosophy or ideology of B. R. Ambedkar

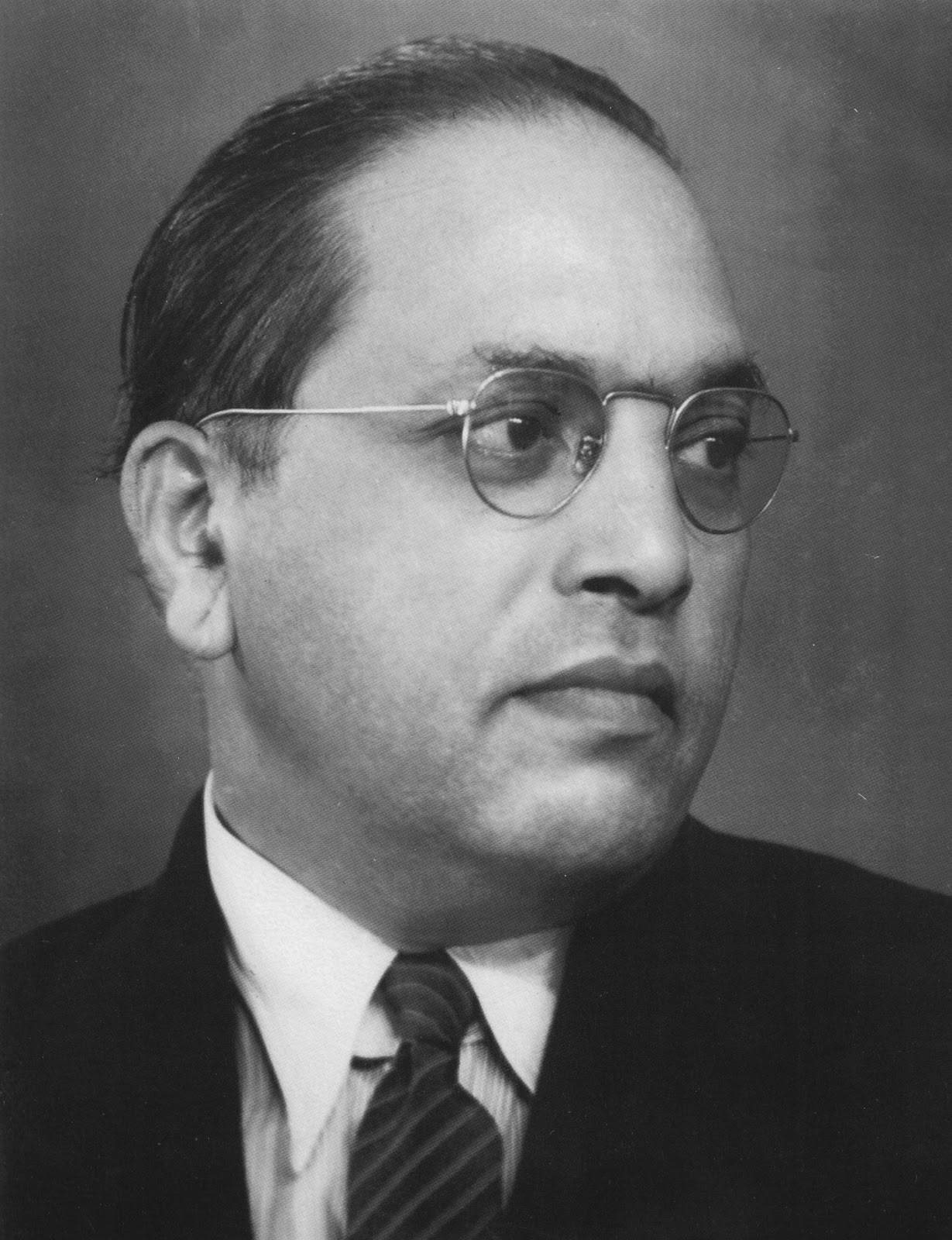
B. R. Ambedkar (1891–1956)

Ambedkarism is called as the teaching, ideology or philosophy of B. R. Ambedkar, an Indian economist, barrister, social reformer, and the first of Minister of Law and Justice in the first cabinet of Jawaharlal Nehru.

Ambedkar completed his doctoral studies at the Columbia University under the guidance of his professor John Dewey. Dewey's philosophy of pragmatism heavily influenced Ambedkar's worldview. Ambedkarism includes special focus on subjects such as fraternity, democracy, communal electorates, conversion out of Hinduism, political power, rule of law, Navayana, among others.

An Ambedkarite is one who follows the philosophy of Ambedkar. Icons of Ambedkarite ideology also include Periyar, Jyotirao Phule and others.

== Social philosophy ==
According to B. R. Ambedkar "Society is always composed of Classes." Their foundations could be different. A person in a society is always a member of a class, whether it is economic, intellectual, or social. This is a universal truth, and early Hindu culture could not have been an exception to this rule, and we know it was not. So, which class was the first to transform into a caste, because class and caste are, in a sense, next-door neighbours, separated only by a chasm. "A caste is a closed social group."

Untouchables were not able to wear good clothes but for Ambedkar, the suit was a strategy for political resistance, an assertion of power, a means to break the caste barrier in a society that is caste ridden.

Ambedkar proposed a Separate Electorate for the untouchables to send their own representatives in assembly, but it was opposed by Gandhi and resulted in his defeat after the Poona Pact but later he advocated for the establishment of Settlement Commission that would provide separate villages for the Scheduled Castes.

== See also ==
Organizations

- Buddhist Society of India
- Ambedkar Makkal Iyakkam
- The Casteless Collective
- Viduthalai Chiruthaigal Katchi
- Dalit Film and Cultural Festival
- Dalit Panthers of India
- Dalit Shoshit Samaj Sangharsh Samiti
- Bhim Army
- Bhim Sena
- BAMCEF
- Bahujan Samaj Students' Forum
- Ambedkar Students' Association
- Birsa Ambedkar Phule Students' Association
