= All Cachar Karimganj Hailakandi Students Association =

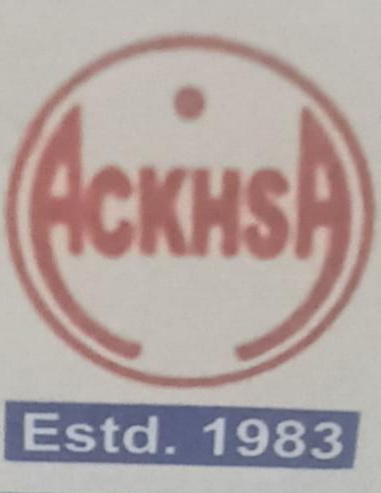
- Seal of "All Cachar Karimganj Hailakandi Students Association"
- Abbreviation: ACKHSA
- Formation: 15 May 1983; 43 years ago
- Type: Student organisation
- Purpose: Separate Barak
- Headquarters: Dargakuna, Cachar
- Region served: Barak Valley
- President: Pradip Dutta Roy

All Cachar Karimganj Hailakandi Students Association (ACKHSA) was established in 1983 by Pradip Dutta Roy. The movement resulted in the establishment of Assam University.

Dutta Roy's started a mass movement in 1983 towards the educational development of Barak Valley. Dutta Roy along with the Vice President and General Secretary of students unions of all the colleges of Barak Valley had a round table discussion on the urgent need of establishing a Central University in the district of the then Undivided Cachar. This led to the formation of ACKHSA. The motive behind the idea of a central university in Barak Valley was to enable higher education for the students in their home valley considering the difficulties the students had to face when they went for pursuing their higher education in the mainland Assam Valley. Assam University was founded 10 years later, in 1994. Dutta was honoured with a doctorate degree from the World Development Parliament in the year 1994, which he dedicated it in the name of the eleven martyrs, who sacrificed their lives for upholding Bengali language on 19th May, 1961.

== See also ==
- Barak Democratic Front
