= Naga People's Movement for Human Rights =

Human rights organisation based in Northeast India

- Abbreviation: NPMHR
- Formation: 9 September 1978
- Founder: Hokiye, Gugs Chishi, P. S. Lorin, Luingam Luithui, Ahu Sakhrie, and Labu Sakhrie,
- Secretary General: Neingulo Krome

Naga People's Movement for Human Rights (NPMHR) is an organisation based in Northeast India. It is a member of the Asia Indigenous Peoples Pact and Unrepresented Nations and Peoples Organization. It plays an important role in spreading awareness in India about the oppression of the Indian Armed Forces and the country's paramilitary forces against the Naga people in Northeast India. It has fought landmark cases in the Supreme Court of India addressing human rights violations.

== History ==
The Naga People's Movement for Human Rights (NPMHR) was started in 9 September 1978 in the Post-Emergency era to represent the human rights violations against Naga people. Some of its founding members were, P. S. Lorin, Luingam Luithui, Ahu Sakhrie, Labu Sakhrie, Gugs Chishi, and Hokiye. NPMHR's mission is to ensure and safe-guard,

- The right to life
- The right to work;
- The right to live together as a people and the unification of all Naga lands;
- The right to hold and communicate one’s belief;
- The freedom of movement, assembly and associations;
- Free access to all places of learning;
- Maximum participation of the people in the making of decisions affecting their lives;
- Freedom from socio-economic exploitation, political domination and military repression;
- Against anti-democratic practices and the dismantling of institutions and social values which legitimize and perpetuate these within our society;
- Against the practices of arbitrary arrest, detention, torture, execution, and the use of unconventional weapons; and
- Against the imposition of undesirable alien legal systems and socio-cultural concepts and ways of life.

NPMHR's first event was organising a Human Rights Week in Nagaland to observe the 30th Anniversary of the Universal Declaration of Human Rights (UDHR). At the village-level meetings organised as part of the initiative, many recounted "the frequent torture, hunger and humiliation heaped upon them by the Indian Armed Forces." They recorded instances of, public execution, mass sexual assault, violent genital mutiliation, electrical shocks, body mutilation, torture, burning of villages, granaries and crops, concentration camps, starvation and forced labour.

NPMHR then organised a human rights conference in Ukhrul in 1985 for human rights activists from India to visit and exchange experiences with Naga activists. The town was then under army control instead of civil administration, and had faced some of the most severe repression in contemporary times. Some of those present for the meeting included, Thinoselie M. Keyho (later, Naga National Council), Mowu Gwizan (National Workers Association), Tiala Gwizan (National Workers Association), Neidonuo Angami (Naga Mothers' Association), Akshay Ramanlal Desai, Gobinda Mukhoty (president, People's Union for Democratic Rights), Jagmohan Singh (general secretary, Association for Democratic Rights), Xavier Dias (trade unionist), Thomas Kocherry (chairman, National Fisheries' Forum, Paul Raj (Indian Peoples Front), Tarun Kumar (editor, Resistance), Saswati Ghosh, and Vemetsu Tetseo (editor, Oking Times) among others.

In 1993 NPMHR, along with several other Naga organisations, celebrated the 'Naga Week' observing the United Nations' International Year for the World's Indigenous People. At this meeting, the Naga peoples and participating organisations adopted the declaration which stated,

- Our Right to live as a people through unification of all Naga areas;
- The Right to be free from the clutches of occupational forces; and
- The Right to have the United Nations recognition of the Naga country as a Sovereign Nation.

== Leadership ==
Neingulo Krome is NPMHR's secretary general. He has previously been a member of the executive council of the Asia Indigenous Peoples Pact (AIPP). Since 2020, the Government of India has imposed various travel restrictions on Krome. In 2020 he was barred from international travel to engage in advocacy without formal legal proceedings against him. In April 2025, he was once again barred from boarding an international flight to attend international advocacy meetings. He was on his way to Kathmandu to attend a conference organised by AIPP, following which he was scheduled to access medical treatment abroad. He was informed that his passport had been cancelled, without any further explanation. The Unrepresented Nations and Peoples Organization (UNPO) issued a condemnation in this regard.

== Legal advocacy ==
The Naga People’s Movement of Human Rights v. Union of India was a landmark court case in India. The Supreme Court emphasised that, as per the provisions of AFSPA, any place can be declared "disturbed" only for a limited time. This declaration must be reviewed every six months. The extension can be imposed only if assistance of armed forces was essential for civil administration, as mentioned in the law. However, many viewed this case as a loss for Naga people as the court upheld the constitutionality of AFSPA and refused to quash it. Nevertheless, the case provided a basis for the 2017 judgement in the Extra-judicial Execution Victims Family Association (EEVFAM) v. Union of India case.

NPMHR also took the Indian Army to court for its violence against civilians in Oinam during Operation Bluebird.

In 1992 after S. C. Jamir was shot in Nagaland House, several students from Northeast India studying in Delhi were harassed by the police in the course of the investigation. Students from the Tangkhul Naga community were singled out for special attention. NPMHR along with People's Union for Democratic Rights (PUDR) condemned excessive police harassment against the students by ordering them to report at the police station, detaining them, searching their rooms, and confiscating their belonging. They worked closely in getting detained students release from custody.

== Campaigns ==
NPMHR issued a condemnation of the 2023–2025 Manipur violence asking that "there should be no misdiagnosis of this conflict as a 'law and order' problem or an ethnic and religious clash.

Tracing back to its roots, NPMHR annually commemorates the UDHR at various locations. In 2023, it reasserted the 1993 declaration of the right to live "as a people through unification of all Naga areas."

== Former members ==
- Nandita Haksar, advocate and writer
- Dolly Kikon, anthropologist
- Aküm Longchari, publisher, The Morung Express

== See also ==
- Naga Students' Union, Delhi
- Forum for Naga Reconciliation
