= United Dalit Students' Forum =

Organization at Jawaharlal Nehru University, Delhi

United Dalit Students' Forum is a socio-cultural organization formed at Jawaharlal Nehru University, Delhi on 6 December 1991 by students.

== See also ==
- Birsa Ambedkar Phule Students' Association
- Ambedkar Students' Association
