= C. V. Subbarao =

C.V. Subbarao (17 November 1953 – 17 January 1994) was an activist, teacher of economics at Delhi University, proponent of civil liberties, journalist, and Telugu writer At the time of his death he was Secretary of the People's Union for Democratic Rights (PUDR). He wrote poems, short stories, essays in literary criticism, the play Thodwnileni Povulu, and an anthology of articles by social scientists on literature entitled Vibhata Sandhalu. He was the first vice president of the Andhra Pradesh Radical Students Union in 1974. As part of PUDR he helped research and write reports on communal riots, prisoners and the penal system, rights to natural resources, environmental degradation, and development and democracy.
