= All India Revolutionary Students Federation =

Organisation in India

- Formation: 1985
- Type: Student society
- Region served: India
- Parent organisation: Communist Party of India (Maoist)

The All India Revolutionary Students Federation (AIRSF) was a frontal organisation of the Communist Party of India (Maoist), a banned organisation by the Government of India.

== History ==
The Radical Students Union (RSU) organised an all-India seminar in Madras in August 1981 to discuss the nationality question in India. The Revolutionary Students' Organisations Co-ordination Committee (RSOCC) was formed as a follow-up step. Four years later, in 1985 the All India Revolutionary Students' Federation held its first conference in Hyderabad. Yalavarthi Naveen Babu, later to become a senior Naxalite leader, became editor of the AIRSF magazine Kalam in 1990. The AIRSF was banned in Andhra Pradesh, but in 2004 the state government lifted the ban to allow for peace talks. While talks were underway the People's War Group (PWG) merged with Maoist Communist Centre (MCC) to form the Communist Party of India (Maoist).

The Naxalites suffered a serious setback in 2005. After Congress legislator C. Narsi Reddy was killed, on 17 August 2005 a ban was re-imposed in Andhra Pradesh on the Communist Party of India (Maoist) and its frontal organisations including the AIRSF and the Radical Youth League. Bans were repeatedly reimposed, one year at a time. In August 2006 the ban was extended for a year. In August 2009 the Andhra Pradesh government extended the ban for another year. In August 2011 the ban was again extended for another year.
