= Birsa Ambedkar Phule Students' Association =

Indian student university organization

- Abbreviation: BAPSA
- Formation: 2014
- Founded at: Jawaharlal Nehru University
- Purpose: Social justice Social equality Social transformation
- Location(s): Jawaharlal Nehru University; Central University of Gujarat; Babasaheb Bhimrao Ambedkar University
- Region served: India
- Website: www.facebook.com/bapsa.jnu x.com/BAPSA_JNU www.instagram.com/bapsa_jnu/

Birsa Ambedkar Phule Students' Association (BAPSA) is a student organization formed on 15 November 2014 at Jawaharlal Nehru University on the anniversary of Birsa Munda's birth. It claims to work for student rights and the issues affecting Scheduled Castes, Scheduled Tribes, OBCs and other minority groups. BAPSA says it stands for assertion, follows Ambedkarite ideology and is critical of both left and right-wing forces on campus. BAPSA is also active in Central University of Gujarat.

== Campus activities ==
Founded by members of the United Dalit Students’ Forum, BAPSA conducts rallies and protests, as well as inviting students and teachers from the campus to talk about their issues.

In 2017, BAPSA blocked the JNU administration building for 20 days in protest at a cut in the number of reserved seats and changes in the entrance criteria for graduate programs which they thought would make it difficult for marginalised applicants to gain admission to study. In February 2018, BAPSA protested the Tata Institute of Social Sciences administration’s decision to withdraw financial aid to students from the Scheduled Caste, Scheduled Tribe and Other Backward Class communities.

== JNUSU elections ==
BAPSA has contested the Jawaharlal Nehru University Students' Union (JNUSU) polls since 2016. The Hindu noted after the 2017 elections, where the BAPSA presidential candidate finished third, that the result showed "there was space for a party that did not subscribe to the Left-Right binary. With every election, the Ambedkarite forces have put up a better show basing their campaign on the 'unity of the oppressed' slogan."

The 2017 elections to the JNUSU Gender Sensitisation Committee Against Sexual Harassment (GSCASH) were won by BAPSA's Magare Bhupali Vithal. The elections were not recognised by the university authorities and were held in protest at the administration's disbandment of the GSCASH.

In the 2018 JNUSU election, BAPSA had its debut in JNU Students' Union having Sanjay Kumar as the Councillor in School of Arts and Aesthetics (SAA). He became the first Ambedkarite representative in JNUSU with a historic victory. In 2019 JNUSU election, Afreen Fatima also won, representing BAPSA & Fraternity Movement alliance, as the Councillor in the School of Language, Literature and Culture Studies.

In the 2024 JNUSU election, BAPSA's Dalit queer candidate Priyanshi Arya defeated ABVP's candidate and became the first Ambedkarite to win a seat in the central panel as the General Secretary. BAPSA's Megha Kumari won the councillor seat for SIS while BAPSA's Ramniwas Gurjar won the Councillor seat for CSLG.

== See also ==
- Akhil Bharatiya Vidyarthi Parishad
- Ambedkar Students' Association
