= Barak Democratic Front =

Socio political organisation in Barak Valley, India

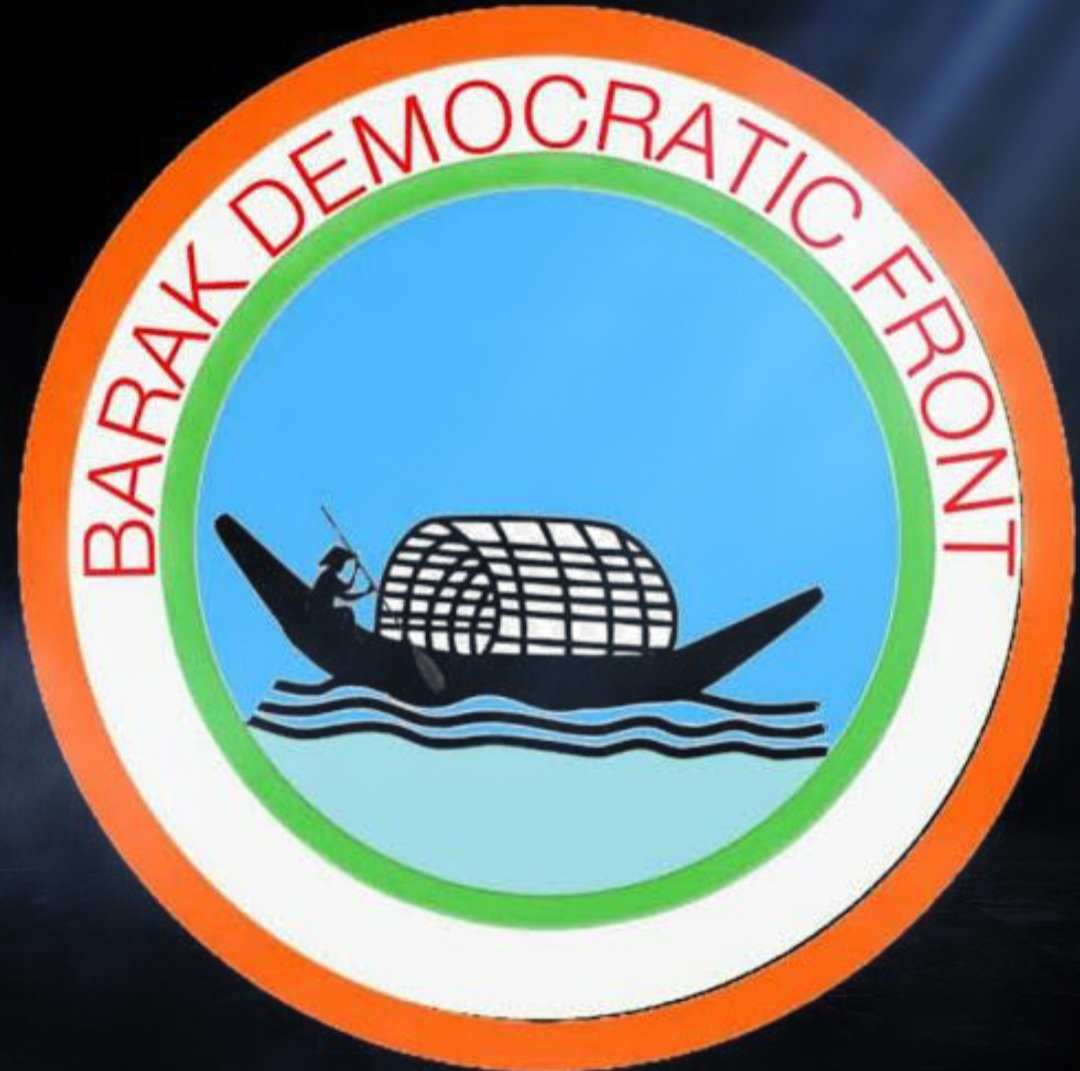
- Symbol of Barak Democratic Front
- Abbreviation: BDF (Joy Barak)
- Formation: 28 November 2020; 5 years ago
- Type: Political Party
- Headquarters: Development Complex, Itkhola, Silchar
- Region served: Barak Valley
- Chief Convenor: Mr. Pradip Dutta Roy
- Chief Adviser: Dr. Tapadhir Bhattacharjee
- Media Cell Convenors: Mr. Joydeep Bhattacharjee and Hrishikesh Dey
- Youth Front Chief Convenor: Kalparnab Gupta

The Barak Democratic Front (BDF) is the first regional political party formed in the Barak Valley, in the Indian state of Assam. The main motive of the party is to secure the socio-economic and political rights of the people. It acknowledges Bengali nationalism as one of the core base of Barak Valley identity and aspires to create a separate Barak state, comprising its three districts namely: Cachar, Hailakandi and Karimganj.

== See also ==
- Barak state movement
- All Cachar Karimganj Hailakandi Students Association
