= Radical Students Union =

Indian Maoist organization

The Radical Students Union (RSU) was a frontal organization of the Communist Party of India (Maoist), a Naxalite group. Founded in 1974, it became defunct after 2005. In 2011 there were indications of plans to revive the organization.

== History ==
The RSU was formed on 12 October 1974 in Andhra Pradesh. Originally it was linked to the Central Organising Committee, Communist Party of India (Marxist–Leninist). The first vice-president was C. V. Subbarao, who was arrested a few months after Emergency began in 1975, and remained in jail until 28 March 1977. At first the organization was brutally suppressed, but after The Emergency was lifted in March 1977, it sprang back into life. The second president of the union was Cherukuri Rajkumar, serving until 1984, who went on to become a senior Naxalite commander. Mallojula Koteswara Rao alias Kishenji and Yalavarthi Naveen Babu were leaders of the RSU in Andhra Pradesh and Delhi.

Issues addressed by the RSU included conditions in schools and welfare hostels, school reservations for the disadvantaged groups, opposition to the New Education Policy and "fake encounters". In its early years there was considerable debate in the Andhra Pradesh RSU over whether it should focus only on student issues or should become part of the New Democratic Revolution, helping to create the agrarian revolution. The second option was chosen.

The RSU started to decline in Andhra Pradesh in the mid-1990s. The RSU and other Maoist organizations were banned in Andhra Pradesh, but in 2004 the state government lifted the ban to allow for peace talks. While talks were underway the People's War Group, a splinter group of the Communist Party of India (Marxist–Leninist), merged with the Maoist Communist Centre to form the Communist Party of India (Maoist).

On 17 August 2005 a ban was re-imposed on the Communist Party of India and its frontal organizations including the RSU, the Radical Youth League and the All India Revolutionary Students Federation, after Congress Legislator C. Narsi Reddy was killed. Bans were repeatedly reimposed, one year at a time. In August 2006 the ban was extended for a year. In August 2009 the Andhra Pradesh government extended the ban for another year. In August 2011 the ban was again extended for another year. However, well before 2010 the organization was defunct.

In November 2011 it was reported that the Maoists were planning to revive the RSU and other frontal groups in Andhra Pradesh, first in forest areas and later in the plains. Tribal students would be mobilized using the issues of corruption, poor school facilities, lack of teachers and lack of job opportunities. However, they would be starting again from scratch, and apparently the Maoist cadres were demoralized.

== See also ==
- Akhil Bharatiya Vidyarthi Parishad
