= Beverly Longid =

Philippines human right advocate

Beverly L. Longid
- Born: Beverly Sakongan Longid; Cordillera, Philippines
- Education: BSc Psychology, BA English Literature, LLB
- Alma mater: University of the Cordilleras & University of Baguio

Beverly Longid is a human rights advocate, Indigenous peoples' activist, and youth leader from the Philippines. She is an Igorot belonging to the Bontok-Kankanaey communities of Sagada and Alab in Bontoc, Mountain Province.

== Career ==
Longid studied psychology, English Literature, and Law. She has dedicated her career to advancing Indigenous rights and social justice both locally and internationally. She served as the Global Coordinator of the International Indigenous Peoples Movement for Self-Determination and Liberation (IPMSDL), an executive council member of the Asia Indigenous Peoples Pact (current) and the International Solidarity Officer of KATRIBU (current), a national alliance of Indigenous organizations in the Philippines. Additionally, she has held leadership roles in the Cordillera Peoples Alliance (CPA) and co-founded the Cordillera Human Rights Alliance.

== Work and activism ==
Longid created a holistic Human Rights framework on self-determination.

She was also a delegate at the International Gathering of Women against Extractivism in Montreal in 2018, and has been actively involved in local, national and international work on human rights and defense of land and environment for many years now.

Important positions held:

- International Solidarity Officer of KATRIBU Kalipunan ng Katutubong Mamamayan ng Pilipinas.
- Coordinator of Indigenous Peoples Movement for Self-Determination and Liberation (IPMSDL) of the Philippines (IPMSDL).
- Member and officer of the Cordillera Peoples’ Alliance (CPA) since 1992, serving as Education Commission staff, deputy secretary-general and chairperson. She is now a member of CPA's Regional Advisory Council.

== Human rights commentary ==
When asked to comment on the human rights situation since President Bongbong Marcos took office in 2022, Longid said:

"human rights violations have significantly increased... He has upheld many of the repressive policies of his predecessor, Rodrigo Duterte, including the Anti-Terrorism Act of 2020 and the infamous counterinsurgency program, the National Taskforce to End Local Communist Armed Conflict (NTF-ELCAC), particularly in the context of the ongoing armed conflict with the Communist Party of the Philippines-New People’s Army (CPP-NPA) and the National Democratic Front of the Philippines (NDFP). Under Marcos Jr.’s administration, Indigenous Peoples, journalists, lawyers, human rights defenders, and environmental activists continue to face severe repression. In 2023 alone, there were 11 cases of enforced disappearances, 60 extrajudicial killings, and approximately 10 incidents of indiscriminate aerial bombings in rural communities. These bombings displaced around 20,000 individuals, many of whom were forced to abandon their farms. Notably, seven of these bombings occurred in the ancestral lands of Indigenous Peoples, areas rich in natural resources".
