= Naga Students' Union, Delhi =

Naga student body in Delhi, India

Naga Students' Union, Delhi
- Motto: Strength in Unity
- Established: 1963
- Website: www.nsud.org

The Naga Students' Union, Delhi (NSUD) is the apex student body of the Nagas living in Delhi. With over 40,000 members spread across the National Capital Region (NCR), it is one of the biggest students’ organisations in Delhi.

== History ==
In the early 1960s, while Nagalim was in the turmoil of the political conflict, and the Nagas were divided into different administrative units, the 8 earliest Naga students in Delhi came together to consolidate themselves into a Union with the sense of reinforcing oneness among the Nagas at all fronts. Under the auspices of Dr. S. T. Toshi and Mr Yehike Sema, a meeting was convened on 25 August 1963 and unanimously elected Dr Aryo Shishak and Mr Khyomo Lotha as the President and General Secretary respectively. In due course of time, the constitution was drafted, adopted and came into force with the motto "Strength in Unity" aimed at promoting the general welfare of the Nagas and the Naga students of Delhi in particular.

With the gradual growth of members and finance, the NSUD diversified its role into many areas. Apart from its regular undertakings of conducting Admission Assistance for the freshers, organising Freshers’ social functions and annual sports meets, the union also commenced various literary and cultural programs. As the pivot of the Naga community’s initiative in Delhi, the union also played vital role in the formation of other organisations for the Nagas. As early as 1966, the NSUD helped in reviving the then defunct Naga Students Federation (NSF). Besides, the Union prides for its service in establishing the Naga Christian Fellowship (NCF) in 1975, and forming the Naga People's Movement for Human Rights (NPMHR) in 1978.

== Membership ==
In the first year, 15 members registered with the union. By the turn of the 1970, the number of members in the Union crossed half a century mark. In the 25th year of the Union, the union recorded more than 300 registered members. However, in the 1990s, the Union experienced a rapid rise of members consequent by the economic liberalisation in leading to the growth of umpteenth educational institutions in Delhi attracting thousands of Naga students seeking higher education. At the turn of the 21st century, the population of the Nagas in Delhi has risen into thousand folds, including both working professionals and students. At the time of the Golden Jubilee Celebration, there were more than 20,000 Nagas living in Delhi including working households, job seekers and students.

== Educational Initiative and Publication ==
The effort to promote education awareness and impart knowledge capacity to the Nagas have been the primary focus of the Union. From its formative stage till date, the NSUD has been giving admission information and assistance to freshers, besides occasionally conducting seminars and literary meets. The Union has published several newsletters, magazines and had published two books – Nagas at Work in 1996, and Nagas Today in 2010.

== Political activism ==
Since its inception, the NSUD has always remained vigilant to all the unfolding of political situations affecting the Nagas, and accordingly made innumerable interventions on its capacity by staging protest, sensitising and mobilising the public, organising seminars on the political issues and human rights, and sending representations to the Indian leadership to impress upon with the desire of the Nagas.

== Structure ==
The NSUD has come a long way and gained a stature considerably both in numbers and activities and the Union has changed and restructured according to the needs and has functioned under different working systems since its inception, viz.

- 2 January 1965 to 3 September 1994 – Unitary Structure
- September 1994 to 1 February 2003 – Quasi-Unitary Structure
- 1 February 2003 – till date – Federal structure

== Unit Under NSUD ==
At present, there are 20 units and these Units under NSUD officially formed their own respective tribal unions with their own constitutions and function within the framework of the constitution of NSUD, which stands at the apex.

Name	Present President
Anal Lenruwl Tangpi Delhi (Anal Students' Union, Delhi)	Steffy Khumlo
Angami Krotho Delhi (Angami Students' Union, Delhi)	Noune Miachieo
Chakhesang Students' Union, Delhi	Taveyi Nienu
Chiru Students' Union, Delhi	Apui Sukreng
Chothe Athourul Ngei Abom Delhi (Chothe Students' Union, Delhi)	Makan Razat Chothe
Inpui Students' Union, Delhi	Anthony Bariam
Lamkang Kurchuknao kunpun Delhi (Lamkang Students' Union, Delhi)	Sarah Leivon
Maralui Karalimei Swijoikang Delhi (Maram Students' Union, Delhi)	Michael Maningdouba
Mao Students' Union, Delhi	Besii Daikho
Maring Students' Union, Delhi	Ringpi Dangshawa
Monsang Students' Union, Delhi	Mongamwar Khartu
Moyon Students' Union, Delhi	Vanglen Roderick Chinir
Pochury Students' Union, Delhi	Mezingju Thurr
Poumai Naga Tsiidoumai Me, Delhi (Poumai Students' Union, Delhi)	Johnson Yangnah
Rengma Students' Union, Delhi	Kenilo Seb
Sümi Students' Union, Delhi	Hika Zhimomi
Tangkhul Katamnao Long, Delhi (Tangkhul Students' Union, Delhi)	Zanngasung Zimik
Tarao Students' Union, Delhi	Ringku Khulan Tarao
Thangal Students' Union, Delhi	Grace Kadeikeimi
Zeliangrong Students' Union, Delhi	Kairidinbo Marenmai

== Current Executive Members ==
The Executive Council for the session 2026-27:

A. Executive Council

Position	Name
President	Chipika Zhimo
Vice President	L. Chakho
General Secretary	Yurngam A. Shimray
Asst. General Secretary	Kiboto K. Chishi
Finance Secretary	Mazhu Trakha
Women Affairs	Penshakning Chara Moyon
Social & Cultural Secretary	Thotsem Mahungnao
Asst. Social & Cultural Secretary	Nekuto Tetseo
Games & Sports Secretary	Joseph Hingkung
Asst. Games & Sports Secretary	B. K. Marakpa
Public Relations Secretary	Swuyekhrulu Nakro
Asst. Public Relations Secretary	—-
Property Secretary	—-

B. Assembly Affairs

Position	Name
Assembly Speaker	—-
Deputy Speaker	—-
Assembly Secretary	—-
Assembly Deputy Secretary	—-
