= All Assam Manipuri Students' Union =

All Assam Manipuri Students' Union (AAMSU), ꯑꯣꯜ ꯑꯁꯥꯝ ꯃꯅꯤꯄꯨꯔꯤ ꯁ꯭ꯇꯨꯗꯦꯟꯠ꯭ꯁ' ꯌꯨꯅꯤꯌꯟ) is a group that works for the development of students of Meitei ethnicity (also called Manipuri ethnicity) living in the Indian state of Assam. It represents the interests of Manipuri students and works for the cultural, educational, and social development of the Manipuri community across the state.

== History ==
The union was established in 1978 with the goal of promoting education and safeguarding the rights of Manipuri students in Assam. Since its formation, AAMSU has organized social, educational, and cultural programs to strengthen community identity and unity.

At its 40th foundation day celebration in 2018, leaders highlighted achievements such as the introduction of the Manipuri language in Assam University and colleges, the appointment of Manipuri language teachers, and the establishment of Manipuri-medium schools. The organization has also campaigned for socio-economic upliftment and equal opportunities for Manipuri students.

== Activities ==
=== Educational and cultural advocacy ===
AAMSU works to promote Manipuri language and education in Assam. The union has repeatedly appealed to the state government for better facilities in Manipuri-medium schools and for recognition of Manipuri as an official language of Assam.

=== Observation of Manipuri Martyrs’ Day ===
The union annually observes Manipuri Martyrs’ Day on 13 August to honor those who died in the Anglo-Manipur War of 1891. In 2018, the 127th Martyrs’ Day was organized at Sonai in Cachar district, featuring a peace rally and formal meeting attended by community and political leaders. AAMSU has also demanded that the day be declared a gazetted holiday in Assam.

== Political and social engagement ==
AAMSU has been involved in various movements related to community rights. In 2016, three of its members were arrested and later released following protests demanding the inclusion of Manipuri as a regional language option in government recruitment examinations. In 2023, the union participated in a peace rally in Hojai, calling for peace in Manipur and highlighting concerns over demographic changes in Northeast India due to cross-border migration.

== Relations and clarifications ==
In July 2023, AAMSU issued and later withdrew a statement that was misinterpreted as a “quit notice” to Mizo residents in Barak Valley. The union clarified that it only advised caution following tensions between communities and reaffirmed its commitment to peaceful coexistence.

== Meeting with the Chief Minister ==
On 12 February 2024, an AAMSU delegation met Assam Chief Minister Himanta Biswa Sarma to discuss issues related to the Manipuri community. The delegation proposed upgrading the Manipuri Boys’ Hostel in Silchar and requested inclusion of Manipuri among the official languages of Assam. The Chief Minister assured government support for these proposals.

== See also ==
- Meitei people in Assam
- Meitei language in Assam
