= Ambedkar Students' Association =

Indian student organisation

- Abbreviation: ASA
- Predecessor: Progressive Students Forum
- Formation: 1993
- Founder: Rajasekhar
- Purpose: Social justice Social equality
- Location(s): University of Hyderabad; Central University of Tamil Nadu; Pondicherry University; Tata Institute of Social Sciences; Central University of Gujarat; Central University of Kerala; Panjab University
- Region served: India

Ambedkar Students' Association (ASA) is a student organisation in India representing students from Scheduled Castes and Scheduled Tribes (SC/ST), Other Backward Class (OBC), religious minorities and other oppressed communities. ASA works for the assertion of students from dalit and other marginalised communities.

== History ==
ASA was founded in 1993 by a group of Dalit students at Hyderabad Central University, led by PhD scholar Rajasekhar.

== Role ==
ASA is active in University of Hyderabad, University of Mumbai, Pondicherry University, Tata Institute of Social Sciences, Central University of Gujarat, Central University of Kerala Central University of taminadu and Punjab University. ASA conducts regular seminars and events on Ambedkarism and protests. It also works for scholarships and fee issues of SC/ST/Blind students. ASA actively works for implementation of reservation policy on campus and against incidents of caste discrimination on campus.

== See also ==
- Birsa Ambedkar Phule Students' Association
