= List of Jawaharlal Nehru University people =

This is a list of people associated with the Jawaharlal Nehru University. Excluded are those people whose only connection with JNU is that they were awarded an honorary degree.

== Alumni ==
=== Arts ===
Name	Class Year	Degree	Notability	References
Sanjay Chauhan (screenwriter)		MA, MPhil (Centre for Indian Languages, School of Languages)	Film story, Screenplay, Dialogue writer, Author [I am Kalam; Sahib Biwi aur Gangster; Paan Singh Tomar; Urmi, Main Aur Pradhan Mantri]	
P. Jaya Kumar		MA (Arts and Aesthetics)	Filmmaker, Screenwriter, Author	
Srijit Mukherji			Bengali film director	
Swara Bhasker		MA (Sociology)	Bollywood actress	
Archishman Sarker		MA (Arts and Aesthetics), MPhil & PhD (Visual Arts)	Indian art historian	
Shaunak Sen		PhD (Arts and Aesthetics)	Indian filmmaker, winner of Golden Eye award	
B. V. Nandini Reddy	1994	International Politics	Telugu Film Director	

=== Politics and Law ===
==== Heads of State and Government ====
Name	Class Year	Degree	Notability	References
Baburam Bhattarai	1986	PhD in Urban Planning	36th Prime Minister of Nepal	
Ali Zeidan			24th Prime Minister of Libya	

==== Others ====
Name	Class Year	Degree	Notability	References
Mukul Arya			Ambassador of India to Palestine	
Ajit Seth		M.Phil	30th Cabinet Secretary of India	
Amitabh Kant		MA	CEO of NITI Aayog	
Amitabh Rajan		MA (History); PhD (Sociology)	Home Secretary of Maharashtra, Chairman of Reserve Bank of India Services Board	
Arvind Gupta		PhD (School of International Studies)	Deputy National Security Advisor of India	
Ashok Tanwar			Former President of Indian Youth Congress	
Aishe Ghosh		MA, M.Phil	Student Activist	
Muhammed Muhsin		PhD in Social Work	Politician Communist Party of India, MLA - Kerala Legislative Assembly	
Dipsita Dhar			Student Activist	
Chandan Kumar		Master in Computer Science	Student Activist	
Gurjit Singh				
Lê Lương Minh			13th Secretary General of ASEAN	
Jyotindra Dixit		PhD (School of International Studies)	2nd National Security Adviser	
Nirmala Sitharaman	1984	MA (Economics); M.Phil.	Former Defense Minister of India Finance Minister, India	
Palagummi Sainath			Renowned journalist, Ramon Magsaysay Laureate	
Prakash Karat		M.Phil & PhD	Former General Secretary of Communist Party of India Marxist	
Ranjit Nayak		MA (Sociology)	World Bank's Chief for Kosovo Chief Adviser of Macedonia on International & EU affairs	
Pradeep Narwal		MA (History)	INC Politician AICC Secretary	
Sanjay Hansda		MA (Economics)	Executive Director of the Reserve Bank of India	
Shehla Rashid		MA (Sociology)	student activist	
Sitaram Yechury			General Secretary, Communist Party of India (Marxist)	
S. Jaishankar		MA (Political Science); M.Phil. & PhD in International Relations	IFS Officer, 30th Foreign Secretary of India Minister of External Affairs	
Syed Ibrahim		MA	24th Director of Intelligence Bureau	
Venu Rajamony		MA in International Relations	IFS Officer. Former Press Secretary to President of India; Former Indian Ambassador to Netherlands.	

=== Humanities and Social Sciences ===
Name	Class Year	Degree	Notability	References
Abhijit Banerjee	1983	MA in Economics	Nobel laureate and Ford Foundation Professor at MIT	
Ananth Kumar	1990	BA in German	Award-winning German Writer in Kassel and Resident Writer of Royal City Gotha	
David Vumlallian Zou		MA; M.Phil.	historian	
Muzaffar Alam	1977		George V. Bobrinsky Professor of History at University of Chicago	
Sanjoy Bhattacharya		MA	historian	
Bishnu Mohapatra		Mphil	Political Scientist and Poet	
Abhay Xaxa	2018	M.Phil; PhD (sociology)	Human rights activist, poet and anthropologist	

=== Military and police ===
Name	Class Year	Degree	Notability	References
R. Hari Kumar			Chief of naval staff of the Indian Navy	
Anjana Sinha		Master of Arts	Director of National Industrial Security Academy	
Soumen Mitra		MPhill	Police Commissioner of Kolkata	

=== Science and Technology ===
Name	Class Year	Degree	Notability	References
Alok Bhattacharya	1976	PhD	Parasitologist and Shanti Swarup Bhatnagar laureate	
Amita Sehgal	1982	M.Sc.	Molecular Biologist, ChronobiologistMember of National Academy of Sciences since 2016	
Apurva Sarin			Cell biologist, N-Bios laureate	
Arun Kumar Shukla	2002	M.Sc.	Structural Biologist, N-Bios laureate, Shanti Swarup Bhatnagar laureate, Infosys Prize laureate	
Gaiti Hasan	1980	MPhil	microbiologist	
Seyed E. Hasnain	1980	PhD	biologist	
Srinivasan Ramachandran			bioinformatician, N-Bios laureate	
Suman Kumar Dhar			Molecular biologist, Shanti Swarup Bhatnagar laureate	
Somdatta Sinha	1982	PhD	Biologist	

=== Others ===
- Brahma Chellaney, columnist and author on geostrategic affairs
- Harun Rashid Khan, Deputy Governor of Reserve Bank of India (2011 to 2016)
- Umesh Upadhyay, President & Director Media at Reliance Industries
- Pankaj Mishra, novelist and essayist.
- Ashok Kumar Sarangi, Chief Vigilance Officer and CGM-in-Charge, Reserve Bank of India
- Jawed Habib, hairdresser and businessman
- Geetanjali Shree, Novelist and short-story writer, winner of International Booker prize
- Asad Zaidi, Hindi poet, literary critic, publisher, and translator
- Vijoo Krishnan, General Secretary, All India Kissan Sabha
- Yogendra Yadav, Phsephologist, Founder member of Aam Aadmi Party .
- Sanal Edamaruku, Indian Rationalist
- Roji M. John, Minister for Higher Education, Government of Kerala
- G. P. Deshpande, playwright and professor of China studies at the Centre for East Asian Studies (JNU)

== Faculty ==
Name	Affiliation	Notability	References
Anvita Abbi	Professor of Linguistics		
Ayesha Kidwai	Professor of Linguistics	theoretical linguist and Infosys Prize recipient	
Balaji Prakash		biochemist, N-Bios laureate	
Birendra Nath Mallick,		Neurobiologist, Shanti Swarup Bhatnagar laureate	
Brahm Shanker Srivastava,		microbiologist, Shanti Swarup Bhatnagar laureate	
Deepak Kumar	Professor of Physics between 1988 and 2016	physicist, Shanti Swarup Bhatnagar laureate	
Franson Manjali	Professor of linguistics.		
Joy Pachuau	Professor of Historical studies	historian	
Kapil Kapoor	Professor of Linguistics & English, Chairman Indian Institute of Advanced Study		
Kavita Singh	Professor of Art History between 2001 and 2023		
Mahendra P. Lama	Professor, JNU	vice chancellor of Sikkim University	
Makarand Paranjape	Professor of English between 1999 and 2018	author, poet, and director of Indian Institute of Advanced Study	
Muchkund Dubey	Former Professor of International Relations	17th Foreign Secretary of India	
Nivedita Menon	Professor of Political thought		
Pius Malekandathil	Former Professor of History	Historian and author	
Prabhat Patnaik	Former Professor of Economics		
Pratiksha Baxi			
Pushpesh Pant	Professor of International relations	food critic and writer	
Raja Mohan			
Robert L. Holmes		philosopher	
Sadhana Naithani	Professor and coordinator of the Folklore Unit	originated the term "colonizer-folklorist"	
Sanjay Puri	held various positions since 1987	Statistical physicist, Shanti Swarup Bhatnagar laureate	
Syed Iqbal Hasnain		glaciologist, writer, and climate change activist	
Gopal Guru	Professor of Political Studies, Editor of Economic and Political Weekly	He received Malcolm Adiseshiah Award for Distinguished Contribution to Development Studies for 2013–14	
Dwaipayan Bhattacharyya	Professor of Political Studies	Political Scientist	
Zoya Hassan	Professor of Political Studies	Member of the National Commission for Minorities from 2006 to 2009, Political Scientist	
Ajay Gudavarthy	Professor of Political Studies		
Brahma Prakash	Professor of Theatre and Performance Studies	School of Arts and Aesthetics	
Ira Bhaskar	Professor of Cinema Studies	School of Arts and Aesthetics	
Rustom Bharucha	Professor of Theatre and Performance Studies	School of Arts and Aesthetics	
Naman Ahuja	Professor of Visual Studies	School of Arts and Aesthetics	
Jyotindra Jain	Professor of Visual Studies	School of Arts and Aesthetics	
H.S. Shivaprakash	Professor of Theatre and Performance Studies	School of Arts and Aesthetics	
