= List of vice-chancellors of the Jawaharlal Nehru University =

The vice-chancellor is the executive head of Jawaharlal Nehru University.

== Vice-chancellors of JNU ==
The vice-chancellors of JNU are as follows.

#	Name	Photo	Took office	Left office	Ref
1	Gopalaswami Parthasarathy		28 April 1969	27 April 1974	
2	Basanti Dulal Nagchaudhuri		1 July 1974	1 Jan 1979	
3	K. R. Narayanan		3 Jan 1979	14 Oct 1980	
4	Yelavarthy Nayudamma		12 June 1981	27 Oct 1982	
5	Pratap Narain Srivastava		5 March 1983	30 Apr 1987	
6	Mohammad Shafi Agwani		7 Oct 1987	6 Oct 1992	
7	Yoginder K. Alagh		14 Dec 1992	28 June 1996	
8	Asis Datta		29 June 1996	30 April 2002	
9	Gopal Krishna Chadha		1 May 2002	6 June 2005	
10	Barid Baran Bhattacharya		29 June 2005	27 January 2011	
11	Sudhir Kumar Sopory		28 January 2011	27 January 2016	
12	M. Jagadesh Kumar		28 January 2016	3 February 2022	
13	Santishree Dhulipudi Pandit		7 February 2022	Incumbent	
