= 2020 Jawaharlal Nehru University attack =

Attack on a university campus in India

- Location of the JNU in Delhi
- Location: 28.5458°N 77.1703°E; Jawaharlal Nehru University, Delhi
- Date: 5 January 2020; Between 7–10 PM (IST)
- Target: Students
- Attack type: Brutal attacks, Attempt to kill, Hooliganism, Vandalism
- Weapons: Iron rods, sticks, stones, acid
- Deaths: None
- Injuries: 39
- Victims: Students and teachers of JNU
- Perpetrator: Members of Akhil Bharatiya Vidyarthi Parishad
- Assailant: 500+
- Inquiry: Ongoing
- Convicted: None

On 5 January 2020, more than 50 masked people armed with rods, sticks and acid attacked the campus of Jawaharlal Nehru University, Delhi, and injured more than 39 students and teachers. Many students received serious injuries. Professors who tried to intervene and protect the students, as well as ambulances carrying injured individuals, were attacked. Eyewitnesses stated that police within the campus did not intervene to stop the mob. After attacking residents of the university campus for three hours, the mob escaped; none of its members was arrested or detained. All 36 students who were injured and admitted to the All India Institute of Medical Sciences, New Delhi (AIIMS) were discharged within 24 hours.

Eyewitnesses, including students injured in the attack, as well as opposition parties and left-wing organizations, accused the members of the Bharatiya Janata Party's (BJP) student wing, Akhil Bharatiya Vidyarthi Parishad (ABVP) of orchestrating the attacks. The ABVP, a Hindu nationalist organization, initially denied any involvement and accused left-wing organisations of carrying out the attack. On 6 January, ABVP's joint secretary for Delhi, Anima Sonkar, admitted on television that two armed men seen in videos of the incident were members of ABVP. Although any one clear motive has not emerged, the attack has been described by some as a way to prevent students from raising their voice against a fee hike and the Citizenship Amendment Act.

Police have said that three of the masked attackers have been identified but no arrests have been made, and complaints have been filed as a single FIR (First Information Report) on unknown people. On 15 January, police confirmed the identification of the masked woman, seen in the video recording of the attack, as a member of ABVP. Police have issued a notice to the woman and two other men. According to police all three have switched their phones off and are yet to be located. As of 31 January, 26 days after the attack, the Delhi Police have not arrested any suspects in the attack.

== Background ==
The Jawaharlal Nehru University (JNU) has been associated with student activism for many years. Since December 2019, the Jawaharlal Nehru University Students' Union (JNUSU) had been participating in Citizenship Amendment Act protests. On 13 November, the JNU administration raised the university's hostel fees, with a fee hike of 150%, making it the most expensive Central University in India. Since 28 October 2019, students of the JNU had been protesting against the fee hike. As part of this protest, students boycotted the final semester examinations. After protests, the university partially rolled back the fees increase by reducing the fee only for students from families with extreme poverty (BPL category) who did not have a scholarship. The move did not convince the students, as there was no rollback in the fee hike for non-BPL category students or for BPL students with a scholarship. To press the administration for a complete rollback of the increase in fees, JNUSU had continued the protests. The semester registration with the increased fee was started by 1 January.

=== Incidents between 1 and 4 January ===
The JNU administration filed two FIRs (First Information Reports) on 5 January at 8:39 and 8:43 p.m. against JNUSU president Aishe Ghosh and 19 others. The first FIR was for allegedly attacking JNU security guards and vandalising a server room on 4 January 2020 at 1:00 p.m., a day before the attack on campus. A second FIR was registered based on events that had happened on 1 January. On 10 January, police disclosed the names of suspects who were involved in the incidents on 4 January. Police announced that seven of them were members of left-wing organisations. The names included Ghosh and two people belonging to the ABVP.

=== Incidents on 5 January ===
According to a professor, around 50 teachers and 200 students were holding a meeting on the campus to discuss their opposition to the increase in hostel fees when the attack started. The attack has been described by some as a way to prevent students from raising their voice against the fee hike and CAA.

== Attack on the campus ==
On 5 January, at around 7:00 p.m., a masked mob armed with iron rods, sledgehammers, sticks, and bricks attacked the campus of Jawaharlal Nehru University, Delhi, injuring students and teachers, as well as vandalising hostels. The assault lasted for three hours. The mob moved from one hostel to another, attacking people. They chanted slogans calling the victims "Naxalites" and "anti-national". Attackers shouted "Jai Shri Ram" (Hail Lord Ram!), a slogan that has been often used as a battle cry by far-right Hindu groups.

Witnesses stated that the attackers broke windows and attacked medics. In a video, attackers were seen charging down a hostel hallway raising sticks, bats and broken bottles while students shouted "get out". The leaders of student bodies with liberal views and those who spoke against Prime Minister Narendra Modi's Hindu nationalist policies were attacked. Some students locked themselves inside rooms to escape the attackers.

Sabarmati Hostel, with 400 students residing in it, was reported to have faced the worst attack. Two students residing in the hostel jumped from their rooms on the first floor in an attempt to escape the attackers, fracturing their legs in the process. The hostel was badly damaged in the attack. Every floor in the hostel had shattered glass, as well as broken doors, windows and furniture.

The assault left more than 39 students and teachers injured. When an ambulance arrived at 9:00 p.m., carrying two doctors and two volunteers to attend to the victims, the mob surrounded the ambulance with rods and sticks, and prevented the doctors from assisting the injured. The attackers also injured a volunteer and broke the windows and punctured the tires of the ambulance. The attackers said, "there was no need to provide medical assistance to any one on the campus".

Streetlights were shut off by the authorities during the incident. The mob roamed around the campus freely without any police intervention. Students accused the police of intentional inaction. Videos show students being beaten by the attackers, while police officers did nothing. While the students escaped through the gate, the police officers asked them to shout "Hail Mother India". The students accused the police of being complicit with the attackers.

The mob assaulted journalists and social activist Yogendra Yadav, who attempted to enter the campus on receiving news of the incident. JNUSU president Aishe Ghosh was also pictured bleeding due to injuries sustained in the violence. Cars and rooms in the Mahi Mandavi, Sabarmati and Periyar hostels were vandalized. The School of Social Sciences was also affected. The crowd of attackers were seen in videos walking around the campus with sticks.

After vandalizing the campus for around three hours, the mob went out without facing arrest or detention by the police. Police said they received 50 SOS calls between 4:00 and 5:00 p.m., however, they were only given written permission to enter the campus at 7:45 p.m.

== Aftermath ==
The 36 students who were injured and admitted to the All India Institute of Medical Sciences, New Delhi (AIIMS) were discharged within 24 hours. 32 people had suffered injuries such as fractures, lacerations, abrasions and soft tissue injuries, while four had suffered minor head injuries. Three of the people injured were admitted to the Safdarjung Hospital.

The warden of the Sabarmati hostel resigned, stating that he had tried but failed to provide security to the hostel. Several students left the campus, calling it unsafe.

Left-wing organisations and several students accused members of the BJP's student wing, Akhil Bharatiya Vidyarthi Parishad (ABVP) of orchestrating the attacks. ABVP, a Hindu nationalist student organization denied involvement and blamed the left-wing organisations.

Screenshots of chats from WhatsApp groups named "Friends of RSS" and "Unity Against Left" were shared on social media, where the group members were seen planning to attack the JNU students. The group's members were found to belong to ABVP. NDTV published pictures of the members of ABVP with sticks and batons before the attacks began.

Chief Minister of Delhi Arvind Kejriwal held a meeting with ministers in the early hours of 6 January, to discuss the "serious condition" prevailing at JNU. After the meeting, Sanjay Singh stated that, "The assault on students and professors is really shameful. This is happening in the capital of India. The world is watching us. What message are we sending to the world?" He added that the Central government (to whom Delhi Police reports) must "act immediately and restore peace in Delhi".

On 6 December, Swati Maliwal, the chief of Delhi Commission for Women, issued summonses to the police over the assault on female students in the attack.

=== Calls for removal of the Vice Chancellor ===
The JNUSU statements after the incident said, "The Vice Chancellor [...] is behaving like a mobster who perpetuates violence [...] For nearly seventy days now, the students of JNU have been fighting a courageous battle to save their university from the clutches of privatization and greed [...] Today on 5 January they imported goons from outside, especially DU". The Jawaharlal Nehru University Teachers' Association (JNUTA) wrote a third letter to the President of India Ram Nath Kovind regarding the "urgent need for the removal of professor M Jagadesh Kumar from his position as the vice chancellor". The letter stated that, "Yesterday's unprecedented events at the University have served to highlight once again the extremely grave consequences of delay in heeding to our appeal".

On 9 January, former HRD Minister and BJP senior leader, Murli Manohar Joshi, sought the removal of the vice-Chancellor (VC). Joshi found the attitude of the VC "deplorable", as he had failed to implement the ministry's proposal to settle the fee increase issue. He had been advised to resolve the issue through a mediation process involving the teachers and the students.

On 18 January 2020, the JNUTA reiterated its demand of removal of the VC. The association said that for the restoration of "normalcy" in the campus the removal of the VC was necessary. The JNUTA also stated that the security of JNU was also responsible for the incidents and demanded a Judicial enquiry into the attack.

=== Acceptance of involvement ===
==== Live television discussion ====
On 6 January, during a panel discussion on the Times Now, ABVP Delhi joint secretary Anima Sonkar accepted that ABVP members were armed. Sonkar said that the armed men seen with rods on the JNU campus in viral videos displayed during the discussion were ABVP activists, including a former student named Vikas Patel and a first-year student named Shiv Poojan Mondal. She said that they were asked through WhatsApp to move in groups and carry rods, pepper spray or acid for self defense. She also claimed that the whole Brahmaputra Hostel was asked to be armed.

==== The sting operation ====
On 10 January, the India Today aired a sting operation on the JNU attack. Two first-year students, named Akshat Awasthi and Rohit Shah, seemed to have confessed to leading the attack on the Periyar hostel. Awasthi confessed to carrying a rod in his hand, wearing a helmet, and channeling and mobilising the attack with the help of students who were members of ABVP, as well as members from outside the campus. He also confessed to calling an organisational secretary of ABVP to organise outside support. The aired videos raised questions over the involvement of the administration and the police in the attack. The reporter asked Awasthi, "Who had shut down the light?" He replied, "Admin [...] I think police". The reporter further asked "So the police helped the ABVP?" In reply he said, "Whose police is it, sir?" He claimed that police were also present inside the campus and a DCP (Deputy Superintendent) of Delhi police had asked them to "hit [students]". He also claimed to have been committing acts of violence inside the campus for the previous six months.

==== Through investigative journalism ====
A video of a masked female student who could be seen vandalising hostels went viral on social media after the 5 January attack. The video named the women as Komal Sharma of Daulat Ram College, University of Delhi. On 10 January, fact checking website Alt News published an article confirming that Sharma was the women in the video. The website revealed that Sharma had confessed her involvement in the attack through a WhatsApp conversation with one of her seniors. Later, on 15 January 2020, the SIT of Delhi Police also identified the masked woman as Sharma, a member of ABVP.

=== Claims of responsibility ===
Hindu Raksha Dal, or the Hindu Defense League, a right-wing group, claimed responsibility for the attack on Jawaharlal Nehru University students. The group leader claimed that the people who conducted the attack on the students and teachers were volunteers of Hindu Raksha Dal and threatened to carry out similar attacks on people who in "anti-national activities" in India. To date, no action has been taken by police against the group.

=== Indian National Congress fact-finding committee ===
On 12 January, the Indian National Congress fact-finding committee released its report on their investigation into the attack, calling the incident "state-sponsored". The report accused vice-Chancellor M. Jagadesh Kumar of planning the attacks. It asked for his sacking and the initiation of a criminal inquiry against him. The report noted that despite SOS calls from the students, Kumar did not allow police to enter the campus till 7:45 p.m. The report also demanded the investigation of other faculty members (who planned the attacks) and the security company hired to ensure safety on the campus.

A committee member called the attack a planned criminal conspiracy and stated that there was sufficient evidence to prove that the attackers were affiliated with right-wing groups. The actions of the administration and police during the attack were questioned. She said that the power supply was disconnected, and the police facilitated the attackers. After the attack, the police did not attempt to press attempted murder charges against the attackers even though victims had received head injuries. The negligence and involvement of the Home Ministry were also suspected in the report. It stated that the Home Minister's remarks against the CAA-NRC protests and his calls for punishing them had encouraged the attackers.

According to a police report, the students had disconnected the internet servers on 3 January and again on 4 January. The vice-chancellor had mentioned in his press statement that the servers were working on 4 January and some students had registered for the new semester that day. The report questioned why the servers could not be made to work on 5 January, the day the attacks had happened, if the servers could be made functional earlier. The report asked if the administration already knew that an attack was going to happen and alleged that the servers were not made functional so that the closed-circuit cameras on the campus failed to record the attacks.

The committee demanded the withdrawal of the fee hike and initiation of an independent judicial inquiry into the attacks.

== Investigation ==
Police have said that some of the masked attackers have been identified and complaints have been merged and filed as a single FIR. On 11 January, the police claimed they had identified 37 out of a total of 60 members of the WhatsApp group that included 10 outsiders, named 'Unity against Left'. The group members had assisted the armed goons in entering the campus. As of 18 February 2020, 43 days after the attack, no arrests have been made by the police. NDTV reported police sources saying that the arrests will be decided by the courts.

=== Questions raised over the police investigation ===
Since the attack, there have been several questions raised over police involvement and police inaction during the attack. Shutting off the street lights, allowing armed mobs to move freely, and allowing attacks on journalists in front of the police are among many such instances which raised questions in the media and on political platforms. Along with the inaction of the police, questions were also raised over the investigation. One such instance is that the details in the FIR do not match the police press briefing of 10 January. The police even described an organisation, Students' Federation of India as Students "Front" of India. In that press briefing, the DCP of police shared photographs of the identified students. On 11 January, the fact-checking website Alt News released an article regarding those photographs. It has investigated the authenticity of the photographs, finding that the design, captions, markings and prints of the photographs exactly matched the photographs tweeted by Ashish Chauhan, a national organising secretary of ABVP. The Alt News article also questioned whether police were conducting a fair and unbiased investigation.

==== FIRs and closed-circuit camera footage ====
One FIR claimed that a group of students broke into the Communication and Information Services (CIS) office on 4 January and damaged the servers and other equipment inside. The FIR asked for action against those students, including JNUSU president Aishe Ghosh. Another FIR alleged that the vandalism by students on 3 January severely affected the biometric attendance and closed-circuit camera surveillance systems. In a statement, the JNU vice-chancellor had claimed that the violence on 5 January had its origins in the vandalism which occurred on 3 and 4 January. Response of two Right to Information (RTIs) unearthed information on the preceding incidents of the attack, specifically server room vandalism and raised further questions on vice-chancellor Kumar's claims and the FIRs by the JNU administration.

The RTIs asked for information on the number of biometric systems destroyed at the CIS office, details of vandalised cameras as well as damaged cables used by the camera servers from 30 December 2019 to 8 January 2020. In response it was revealed that the said biometric system was not destroyed and cameras were not vandalised. Through the RTI it was found that the camera servers are not located in the CIS office. However, some of the cables used in the CIS servers were damaged on 4 January.

The RTI responses raised further questions on the police claims. Initially, police said that footage of the attack was not available and instead they were using screenshots from viral social media posts to identify the perpetrators. Contradicting the police claim, one of the RTI responses points to the footage being available. However, in response to another RTI, no continuous camera footage of the north gate cameras on 5 January, the day of the attack, was available with JNU. There was also a mismatch in responses related to if and when vandalism occurred.

=== Court petitions ===
==== Petition to preserve evidence ====
On 10 January 2020, three JNU professors filed a petition in the High Court seeking a direction to Delhi Police and the government to preserve data, closed-circuit camera footage, and all evidence associated with the attack. The request included retrieval of evidence and data from WhatsApp, Google and Apple. The data, such as messages, pictures, videos and phone numbers of the members of the WhatsApp groups 'Unity Against Left' and 'Friends of RSS' were sought to be preserved. The petition said that the Delhi police had not responded to requests for preservation of data. The petitioners noted their apprehension that without a direction from the court, it may not be preserved. Petitioners claimed that as far as they knew from news reports, the police had not yet retrieved CCTV footage, which is crucial evidence.

On 13 January, The Delhi High Court issued notice to Apple, Google and WhatsApp on the petitions seeking directions to preserve data, CCTV footage and other evidence. The court directed Delhi police to summon and seize the phones of all members of the two WhatsApp groups—'Friends of RSS' and 'Unity Against Left'—who had allegedly planned and executed attacks on the campus. The court directed the JNU administration to provide all the camera footage and also directed Google, WhatsApp and Apple to provide any information requested by the police.

==== Petition seeking to lodge FIR ====
A petition filed in a Delhi Court by Professor Sucharita Sen of JNU sought lodging of FIR into the act of violence in which she suffered a severe head injury. The plea claimed that the complainant had to approach the court due to inaction of the police authorities despite having "clear and cogent" facts and underlying material placed by her before the investigative agency. Chief Metropolitan Magistrate sought an action taken report (ATR) and asked to file it by 25 March 2020. It has directed concerned SHO that the report must include "whether a complaint has been made in the police station; if yes whether any action has been taken on the said complaint; whether any investigation or enquiry has been conducted in this regard and if yes then what is the status of the investigation and If any cognisable offence is made out whether any FIR has been registered or not."

=== Identification of suspects ===
On 15 January, Delhi police confirmed the identification of the masked woman as a member of ABVP and a student of Daulat Ram College in Delhi University. She had been seen wearing a check shirt, a light blue scarf and carrying a stick, in the video recording of the attack and several media outlets had identified her. The state secretary of the ABVP Delhi acknowledged that the woman was a member of ABVP. Police have issued a notice under IPC Section 160 to the woman and two other men involved, Akshat Awasthi and Rohit Shah who were also found out to be the members of ABVP by the Alt News and the India Today. According to police all three have switched their phones off and are yet to be located.

== Reactions ==
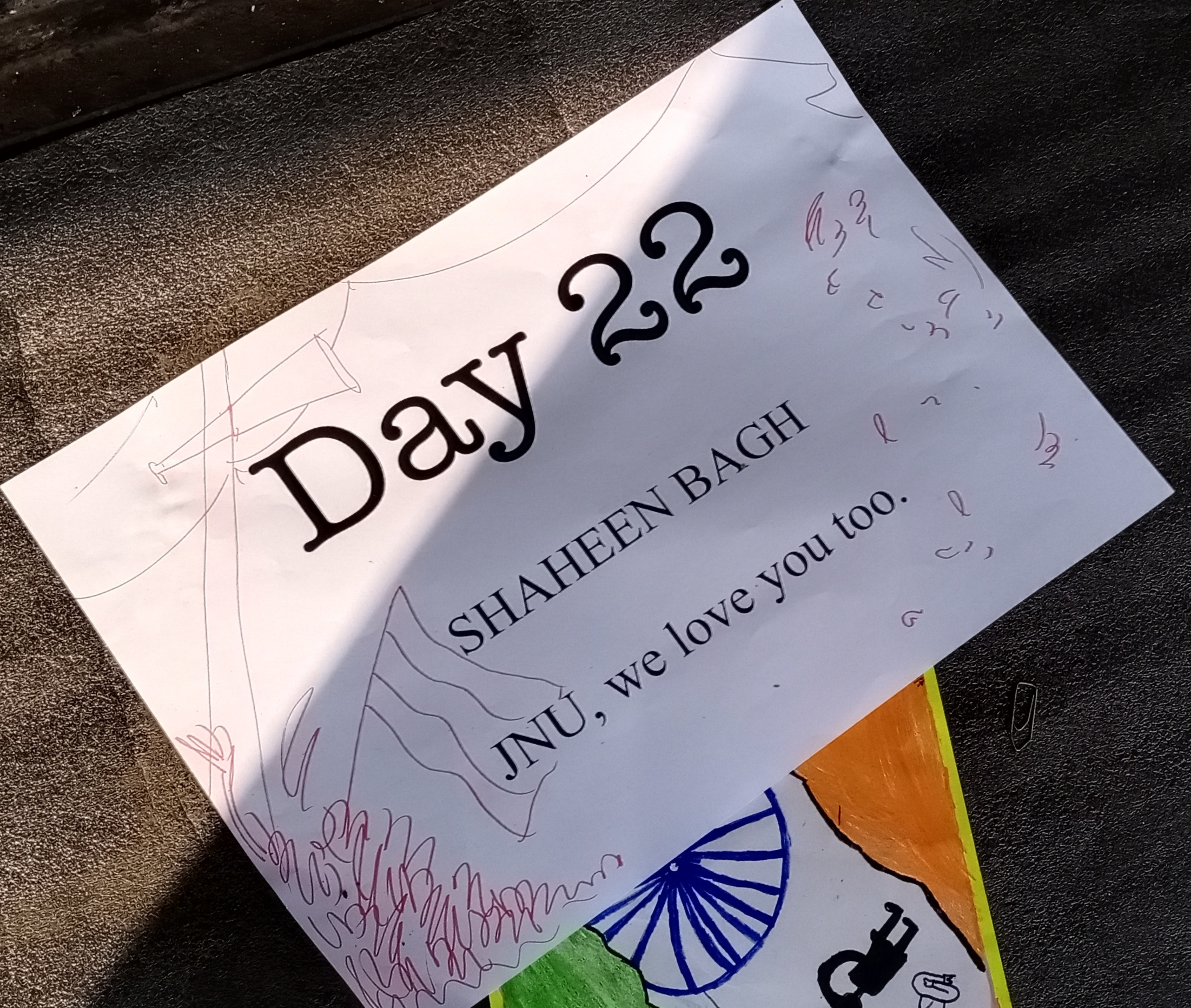
A placard in solidarity with the JNU students at Shaheen Bagh, during the 22nd day of CAA protests at Delhi on 7 January 2019

The Central Government that controls the law and order of Delhi faced "massive criticism" from the opposition party leaders, film actors, students, activists and business leaders. The Minister of External Affairs, Subrahmanyam Jaishankar, and Nobel Prize winner Abhijit Banerjee, both alumni of JNU, condemned the attacks.

Gautam Gambhir, a BJP MP from New Delhi stated that "strictest punishment has to be meted out to these goons". Various people condemned the violence, including Anand Mahindra and Kiran Mazumdar Shaw, Congress Party member Priyanka Gandhi, who blamed the right, and Kapil Sibal, who asked for a probe. The Congress Party described the attack on JNU as "state-sponsored terrorism", resembling that during Nazi rule. All India Majlis-e-Ittehadul Muslimeen (AIMIM) president Asaduddin Owaisi expressed his opinion on the JNU attack, saying that it was meant to "punish the students as they dared to stand up".

The journal Nature in an editorial published on January 14, 2020, stated that the "government and state authorities must step in and stop violent attacks on academic campuses [...] Some of the peaceful protests are being met with violence, and university campuses are not immune [...] Delhi police "failed to provide protection" to the students who were being attacked; "India's authorities must take the necessary steps to protect their nation's universities and their people's freedom of speech."

=== Protests ===
==== University and student protests ====
University of Hyderabad, Aligarh Muslim University, the University of Jadavpur, Assam University and Gauhati University students staged protests on the night of the attack in solidarity with the JNU students. Protests were also seen in the capitals of Uttarakhand, Chhattisgarh and Bihar. On 7 January, IIT Bombay, the Film and Television Institute of India, the National Law School and foreign universities including University of Oxford and Columbia University also held protests in solidarity.

"The darkest places in hell are reserved for those who maintain their neutrality in times of moral crisis."

— The famous quote attributed to Italian poet Dante Alighieri (from Divine Comedy: part I Inferno), flashed through placards by St Stephen's students as they felt their moral responsibility against wrongdoings.

On 8 January, a huge march was held on the North Campus of the University of Delhi, where the students from the university and colleges affiliated with the university gathered to march in support of JNU students and teachers who were beaten during the incident. They demanded that the masked perpetrators be brought to justice, the removal of M. Jagadesh Kumar from the post of vice-chancellor of JNU, and also demanded the scrapping of the Citizenship Amendment Act, National Register of Citizens and National Population Register. On 8 January, for the first time in 30 years, students of St. Stephen's College held protests on their college campus to show their solidarity with the students and teachers of JNU and Jamia Millia Islamia (Jamia), to criticise the Government's failure to provide protection to the students of this country and the police inaction during the incidents, and also to protest against the CAA and NRC. They boycotted classes, gathered on the campus lawn, and read the Preamble to the Constitution of India. The protesters recited various poems, songs and slogans and delivered speeches where they describeded the Modi government as "fascist and oppressive". Poems like "Hum Dekhenge" (We will witness) by Faiz Ahmad Faiz and "Kagaz Nahi Dekheyenge" (We'll Not Show Our Documents) by Varun Grover were read, and phrases like "Kal bhi tum haare the, aaj bhi tum haaroge, kal bhi hum jitenge" (You'd lost yesterday, you'll lose today also. We'll win again tomorrow), "Is baar nahin hum chhodenge, itihas ki dhara modenge" (We'll not let go this time, we'll change the direction of history), "Zulmi jab jab zulm karega satta ke hathiyaron se, chappa chappa goonj uthega inquilab ke naaro se" (The tyrant will be countered with the chants of revolution) and the famous chants of "Azadi" (Freedom) were recited throughout the protest. The Students' Federation of India called for a nationwide protest against this attack.

==== Protest march to Ministry of Human Resource Development ====
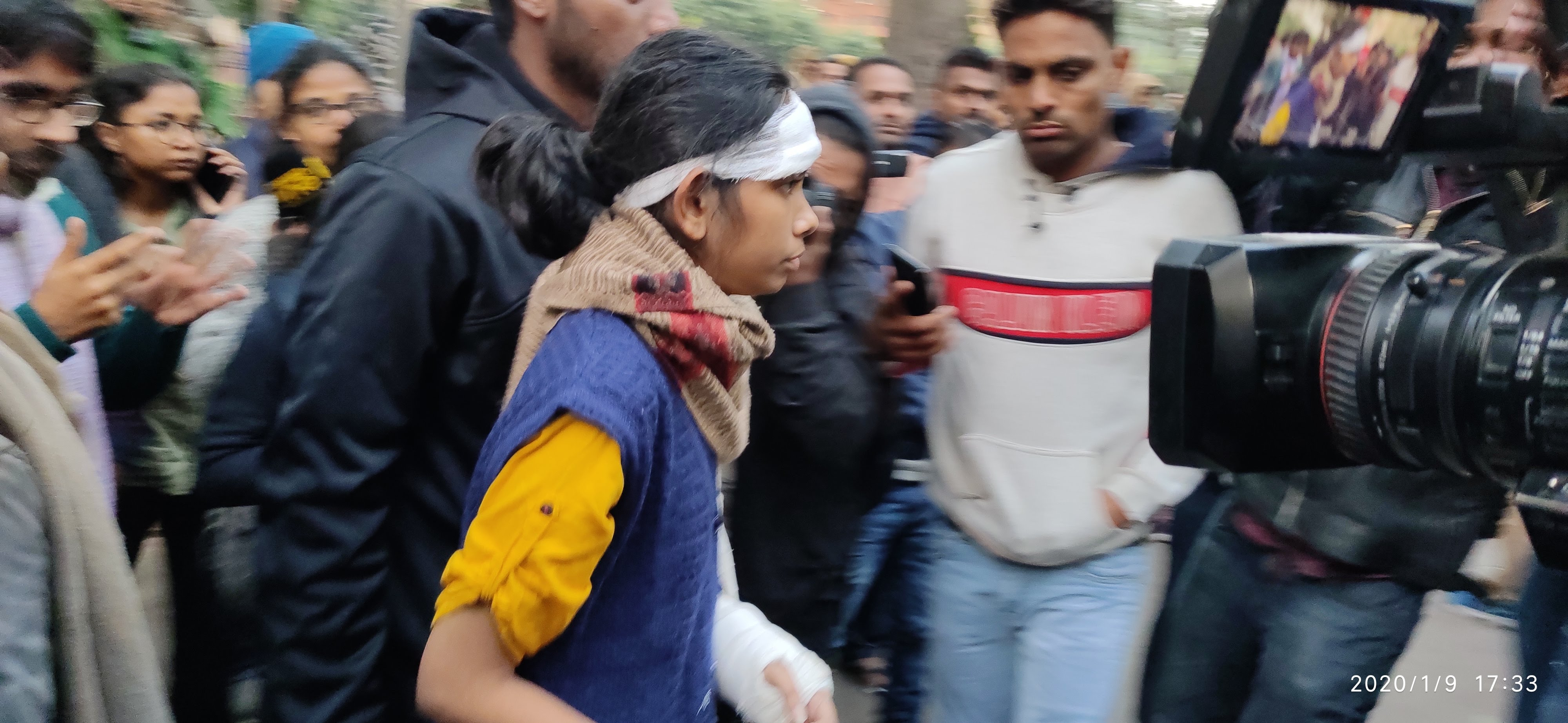
Students of JNU along with JNUSU marched a protest rally to MHRD office.

On 9 January, around 1,000 JNU students and teachers held a protest march to the Ministry of Human Resource Development office in Delhi demanding the resignation of the vice-chancellor. The vice-chancellor, M. Jagadesh Kumar, was accused of allowing the attackers to vandalise the university dormitory and attack the students.

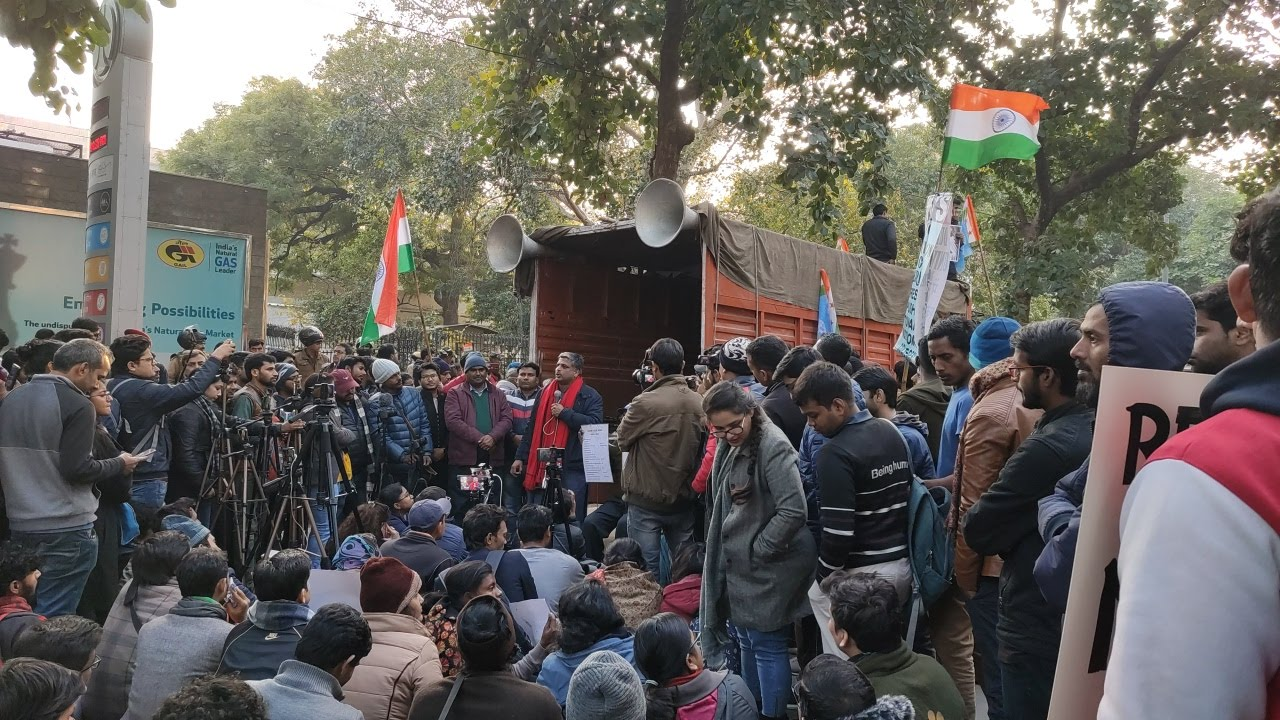
JNU students along with other students staged a protest rally at MHRD road.

After reaching the office a group of students decided to continue their march up to the Rashtrapati Bhavan, the official residence of the President of India. The protesters were stopped by police who chased them and struck them with batons. Several students were detained and later released.

==== Film fraternity reaction ====
A crowd of more than 1000 students gathered overnight at the Gateway of India. Several celebrities including Sushant Singh, Anurag Kashyap, Dia Mirza, Taapsee Pannu, Vishal Bhardwaj, Zoya Akhtar, Swara Bhaskar, Rahul Bose, Sushant Singh Rajput, Richa Chadda and Konkona Sen Sharma also joined the protests in Mumbai. They expressed to the media, "We want to tell them [students of JNU, Jamia, AMU], we are with them and we will stand for them every time".

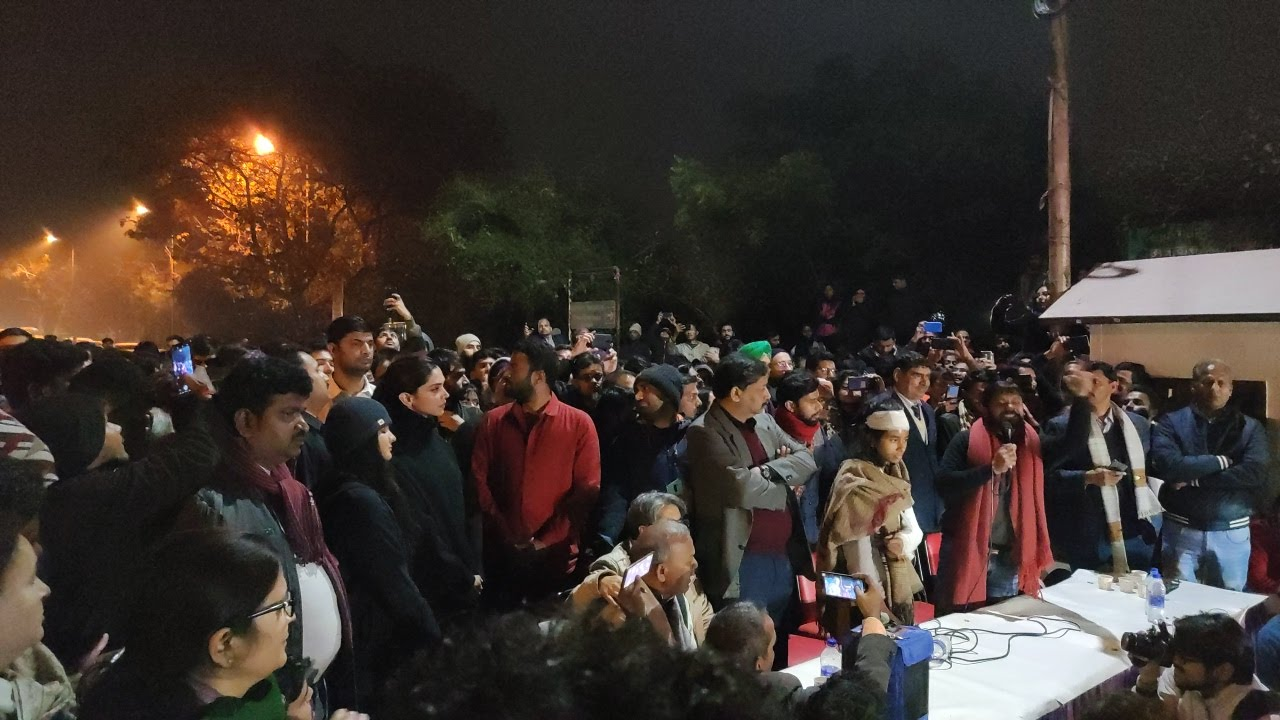
Bollywood actress Deepika Padukone participated in a student protest on the JNU campus to show solidarity with the students who were beaten by goons.

Actress Deepika Padukone visited the JNU campus and stood with the students in solidarity with the victims. Though she did not give a speech, she met with the JNUSU president Aishe Ghosh, who was attacked by the masked mob. Padukone was subjected to massive criticism by members of the ruling BJP party who also asked people to boycott her upcoming movie Chhapaak. She was praised for standing up against a crackdown on dissent, as Bollywood actors usually avoid making statements, fearing backlash and negative consequences for their films. Actor Varun Dhawan talked about similar calls for a boycott of his film Dilwale, and said that the boycott may hurt the business, so it is used as a scare tactic meant to prevent people from expressing their opinion in public. He supported Padukone and stated it was wrong to remain neutral and not condemn the attack.

== See also ==
- Campus violence in India
- Chinese University of Hong Kong conflict
- Siege of the Hong Kong Polytechnic University
