= 2019 Jamia Millia Islamia attack =

Police Raid on a University campus in India

- Part of Citizenship Amendment Act protests
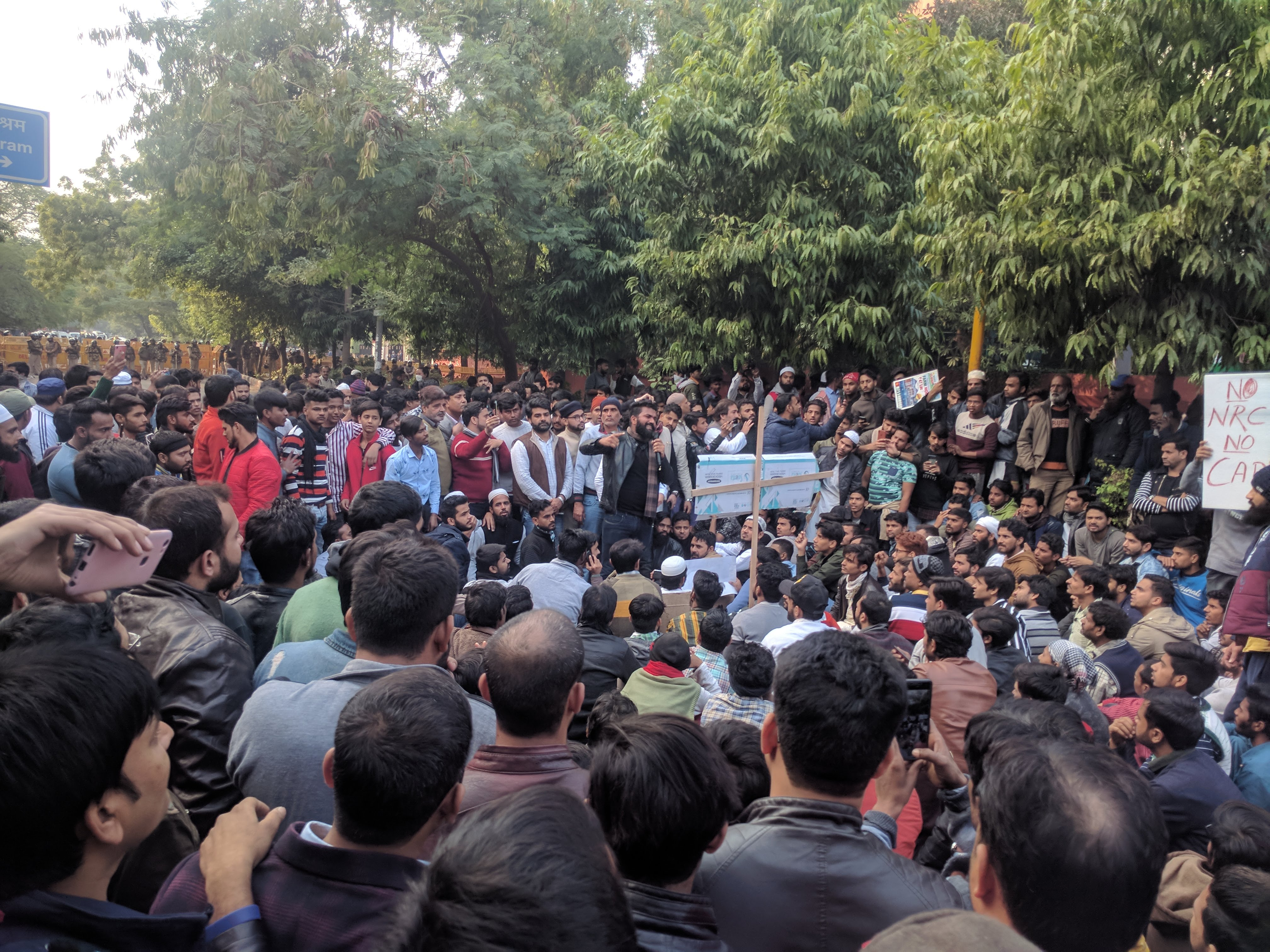
- Jamia students and locals protesting, c. 15 December 2019, a few hours before the attack.
- Date: 15 December 2019
- Location: Jamia Millia Islamia, Delhi
- Methods: lathi charge, tear gas

Parties
Protestors (mostly Jamia students)	Delhi Police

Lead figures
Jamia Coordination Committee (leaderless)	Commissioner of Police, Delhi under the jurisdiction of Home Ministry

Casualties
- Injuries: 60-80
- Arrested: 15
- Detained: 50

The Jamia Millia Islamia Police Raid refers to the forceful entry by Delhi police into the Jamia Millia Islamia university during a confrontation with student protesters that started outside the campus on 15 December 2019. Hundreds of police officers forcefully entered the campus and detained more than a hundred students during the confrontation with the protesters. The police used batons and tear gas to disperse protesters. The police also entered the university library and washrooms and in the process of the violence ransacked parts of it. The visuals of students being dragged and assaulted by the police were telecast by news channels. About two hundred people were injured and were admitted to AIIMS and the Holy Family Hospital.

Thousands of people protested outside the Delhi Police Headquarters immediately after the attack. Reactionary protests were held in all the major cities of India. The attack triggered widespread controversy and garnered international condemnation. The Human Rights Watch urged the Indian government to order a probe into the attack.

== Background ==
The Citizenship Amendment Act protests are a series of ongoing protests in India against the Citizenship Amendment Act, or CAA. The university of Jamia Millia Islamia became a center of the protest.

=== 13 December protest ===
On 13 December 2019, the students of Jamia Millia Islamia University undertook a march to the Parliament protesting against the CAA. They were prevented from going ahead by the police who used batons and tear gas to disperse the protesters leading to clashes with them. Fifty students were detained by the police after the clash. According to the students, police attacked the peaceful protesters with stones and batons, in which several students were injured. The students then retaliated with stones. Police denied the allegations claiming that after the protesters were prevented from taking their march forward they attacked the policemen with stones, after which the police used tear gas shells. Several students were injured in a baton charge.

== Attack ==
On the morning of 15 December 2019, more than two thousand students of Jamia joined the protests against CAA in Delhi. Jamia Millia Student Body and Jamia Millia Islamia Teacher's Association (JTA) condemned the violence that happened on the same day in Delhi and stated that no student or teacher was involved in the violence.

On 15 December, students gathered outside Gate No. 7 of the university and marched towards India Gate along with local people of Jamia Nagar and other university students. When the students reached the traffic signal of Mata Mandir Marg New Friends Colony, Delhi Police attacked the students of Jamia Millia Islamia and dispersed the students by lathi charge, firing and tear gas. The students were beaten by the police including Shaheen Abdullah, Chanda Yadav, Akhtarista Ansari, Ladeeda Farzana, and Aysha Renna at New Friends Colony. The confrontation started at Mata Mandir road around 5:30 pm. Protestors were dismissed by the police lathi charge. Visuals of burning buses began circulating on social media from the same spot where police had started beating the protesters.

At 6:46 pm on 15 December 2019, hundreds of police officers, during confrontations with protesters, forcefully entered the campus of Jamia, without the permission of college authority. The police used batons and tear gas on the protesting students. Nearly a hundred students were detained by the Delhi police and released at 3:30 am next morning. The visuals of students being dragged and assaulted by the police was telecast by news channels. Students from all across Delhi joined the agitation. About two hundred people were injured and were admitted to AIIMS and the Holy Family Hospital. Also, the official of Jamia's neighboring hospital Al-Shifa said that on the evening of the incident, more than 100 injured people were brought to the hospitals for treatment.

Speaking at a press conference on Monday 16 December, JMI's VC Najma Akhtar said, “Our students have been protesting peacefully since Friday. What happened yesterday was unfortunate. We don’t care about buses being burnt, that’s the failure of the police. Our concern is only that our students stay safe. Police coming inside without any notice, damaging our property and the barbaric treatment towards students is not acceptable. A lot of damage has been done inside our buildings, we are not concerned about the material loss but about the emotional turmoil that our students had to go through.”

Police officials had defended the police action by saying that around 4000 people were protesting and the police had to disperse the crowd when the buses were burnt. However, Delhi Deputy CM Manish Sisodia has speculated about a conspiracy behind the burnt buses. He tweeted pictures in which a Delhi Police constable can be seen with a gallon near the burning buses. Journalists and activists have mixed reactions to this conspiracy and speculation.

=== Attack on library ===
The police fired tear gas canisters inside the main library. Students scrambled over desks and smashed windows to escape. In a video, released on 15 December 2019, it can be seen that the students who were taking refuge inside the library were trying to escape from the reading room where tear gas was fired.

Later, the police denied entering the library. On 15 February 2020, the Jamia Coordination Committee released a CCTV footage which confirms that indeed police and para-military personnel entered into the research scholar section of the library and randomly beat up students who can be seen sitting and reading at their respective seats. Another video posted by Maktoob Media an online media platform, shows that the police broke the door of the PG reading room of the library and started beating the students. The students could be seen pleading

Attack on Jamia Millia Islamia's Library.

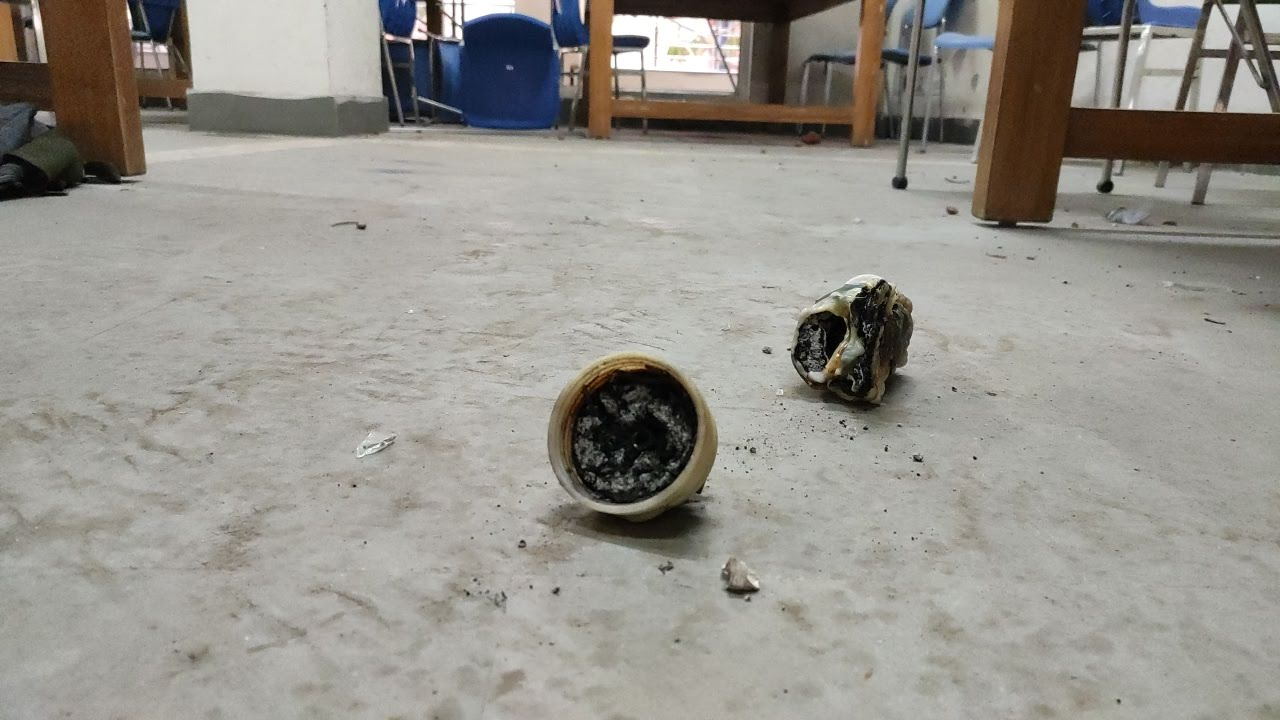
Remains of tear gas shield in the reading hall, central library, JMI.

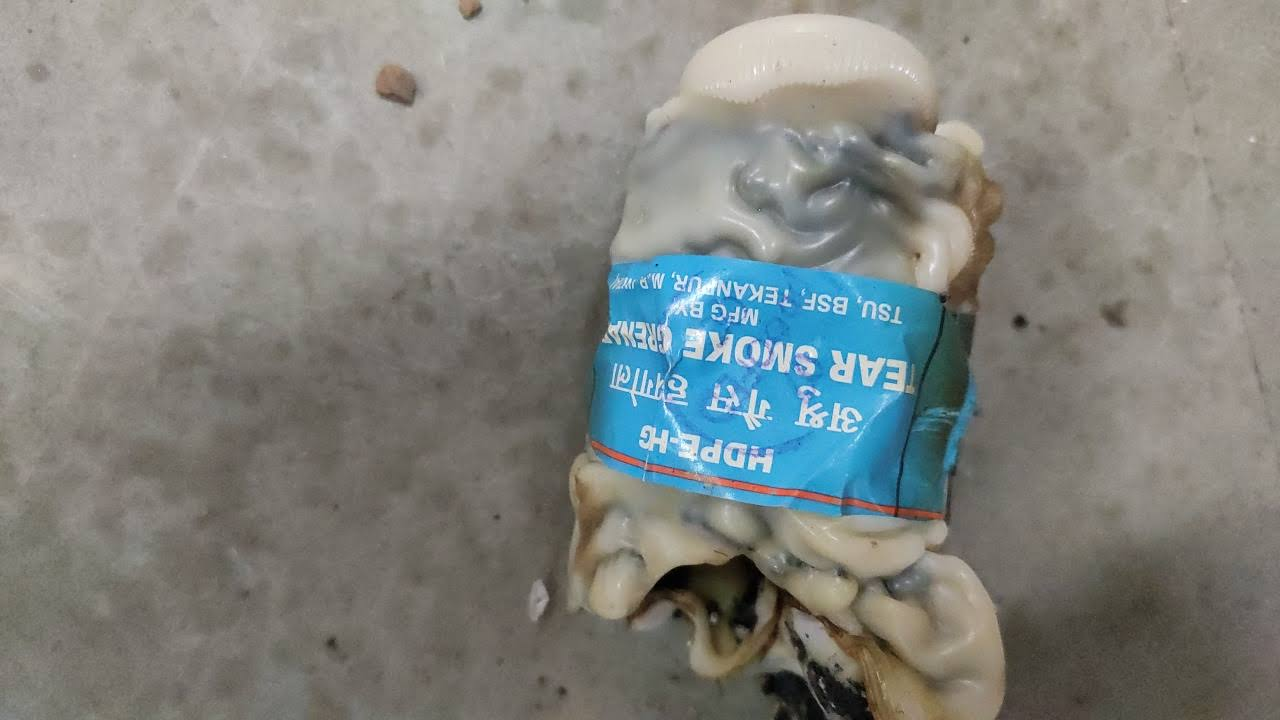
Remains of tear gas shield in the reading hall, central library, JMI

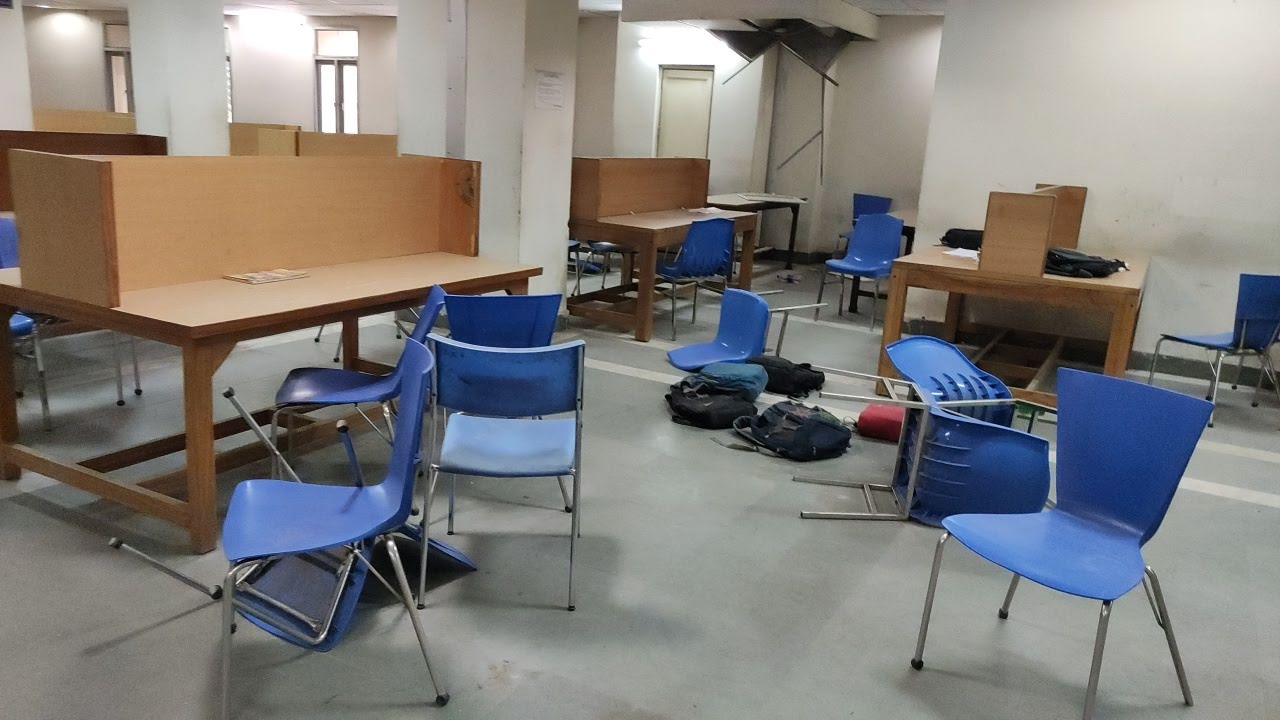
Belongings of students and chair in reading hall after the police attack on the evening of 15 December 2019.

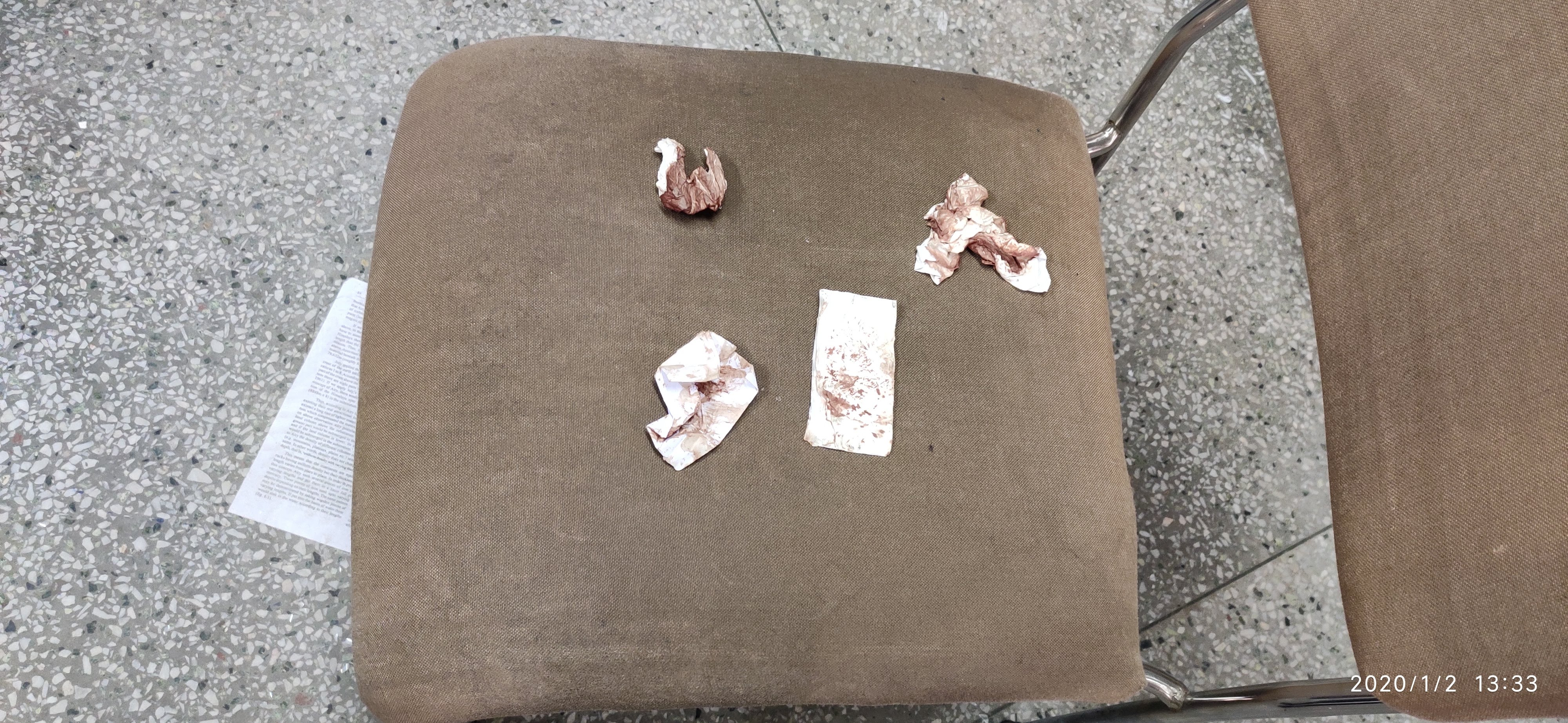
Blood stains from the victimized students found on a chair in the library after the police attack on the evening of 15 December 2019

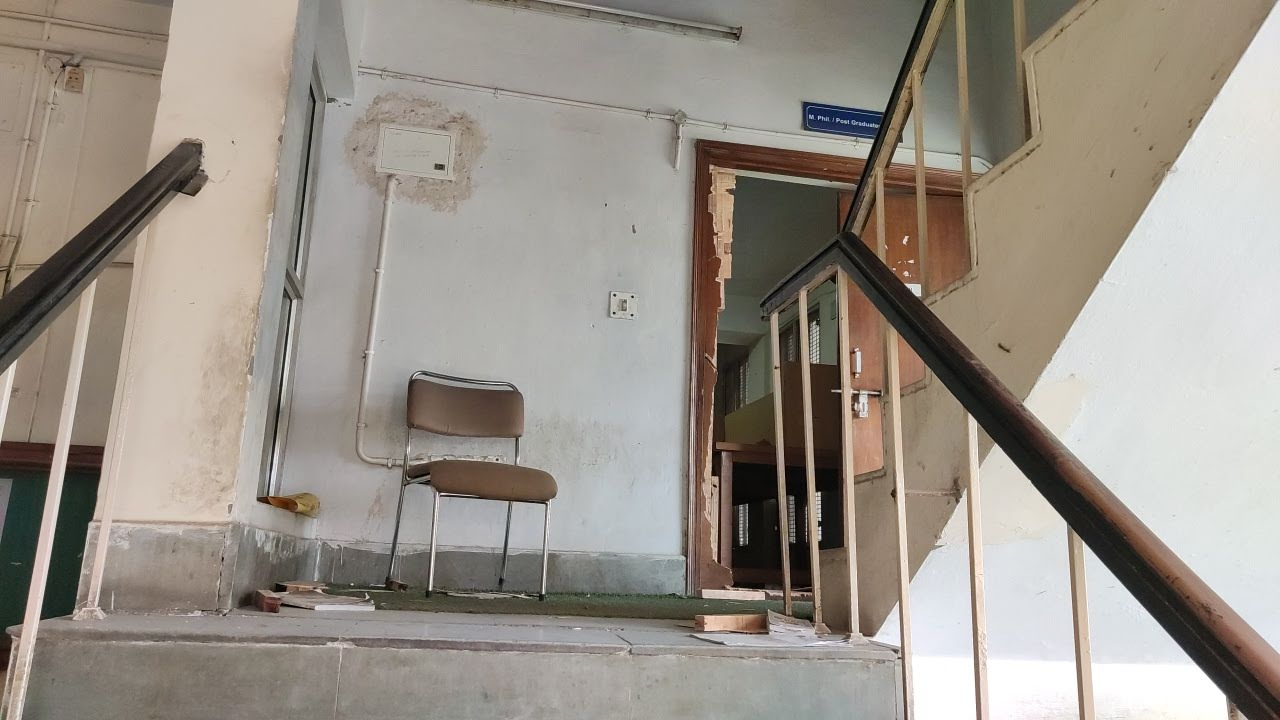
Broken gate of reading hall after the police attack on the evening of 15 December 2019.

with the police not to beat them but it was in vain. The police brutality and vandalism continued and at the end the police can be seen damaging the CCTV which was capturing the incidents. The Quint released another video on 17 February 2020, where it can be seen that police and para-military personnel entered the library and vandalised, breaking chairs and reading desk and damaging CCTVs. It can also be seen that the police lathi charged the frightened students who were trying their best to hide to save themselves from such brutality.

=== Firing ===
On 16 December 2019, two students of Jamia were admitted to the Safdarjung Hospital with bullet injuries received during the protests on 15 December. One of the victims, M. Tamin stated that he was not participating in the protest and was passing through the area on a motorcycle, when police suddenly started caning the protesters and he was shot in the leg by police from point blank range. The doctors treating him stated that the wounds were gunshot wounds. The police stated that they were investigating the allegations of gunshot.

=== Serious injuries ===
Mohammad Minhajuddin, an LLM student from Jamia's law faculty, was in the library when police forcibly entered the campus and beat up the students. Minhajuddin lost his left eye due to a brutal beating by the police. According to media reports, Minhajuddin said that he was not involved in any kind of protest. In viral images and videos, he can be lying down on the floor of a bathroom of a library.

When a student tried to catch the tear gas without exploding, the can exploded in his hand and the student lost his thumb. Friends took him to the nearest hospital, Holy Family, but the damage could not be repaired.

=== Emergency protest ===
News of police attacks on students inside Jamia campuses was emerging on social media. On the same night of 15 December 2019, students of JNU, DU Ambedkar University and common citizens gathered outside the police headquarters at ITO. The protesters demanded the vacation of the Jamia campus and the release of students detained by the police. This protest was called by JNU Students Union and many students and citizens participated in this protest in the night itself.

== Aftermath ==
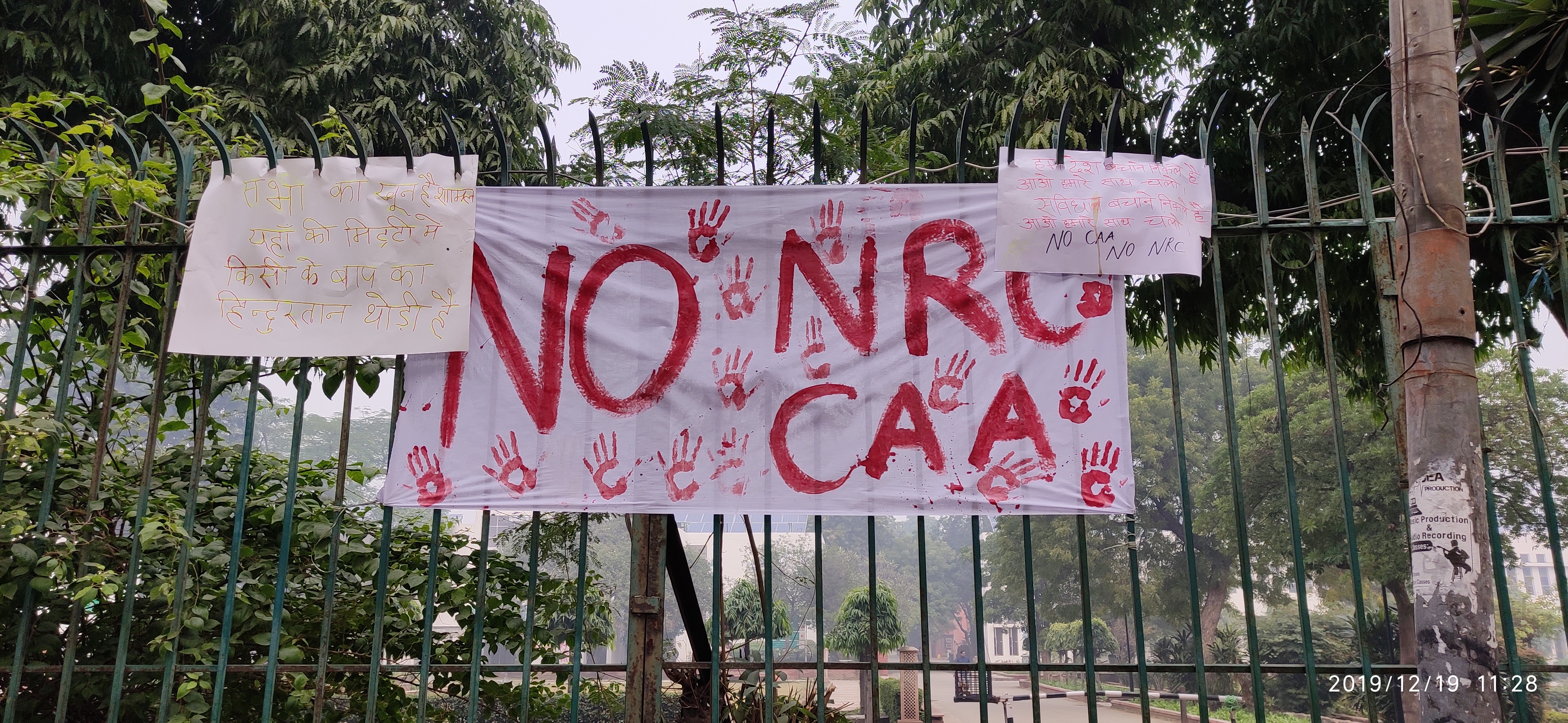
Poster of the movement against NRC-CAA policy on the wall of Jamia Millia Islamia after the attack on 15 December.

The university shut down until 5 January 2020 and the residents were asked to leave the campus. After this, the students and alumni of the university started protesting fiercely at Jamia Gate No. 7. This protest runs for more than two months at the same place till the COVID-19 lockdown.

=== Investigation ===
After the violence, Jamia's VC Najma Akhtar addressed the media where she condemned the police action and said that the police entered the campus without permission. On 12 January, vice-chancellor Najma Akhtar said that she would approach the court to file an FIR against the Delhi Police. However, no FIR is filed yet. She also assured students that campus security would be improved. An internal probe by the Delhi police revealed that at least three bullets were fired during the crackdown.

On 30 January, Delhi Police identified photos of 69 people suspected of being involved in violence and rioting during the protest against CAA in Jamia Nagar.

=== Reactions ===
Some celebrity alumni of Jamia, including Shah Rukh Khan, Virender Sehwag, and Kabir Khan were criticized for the failure to condemn the crackdown on their alma mater. Hollywood actor John Cusack extended his support to the protesting students of Jamia Millia Islamia and also condemned the police brutality inside the Jamia campus. Immediately after the incident, social media platforms were filled with tweets. Bollywood celebrities including Rajkummar Rao, Ayushmann Khurrana, Parineeti Chopra, Sidharth Malhotra, Huma Qureshi, Manoj Vajpayee, Anurag Kashyap, Anubhav Sinha, Vickey Kaushal, Richa Chadha, Tapsee Pannu, Vikrant Massey, Dia Mirza, Zeeshan Ayyub, Swara Bhaskar, Bhumi Pednekar and others have extended their support to protesting students by expressing their opinions over it on X(earlier twitter) and asking the government to maintain democratic decorum.

=== Protests ===
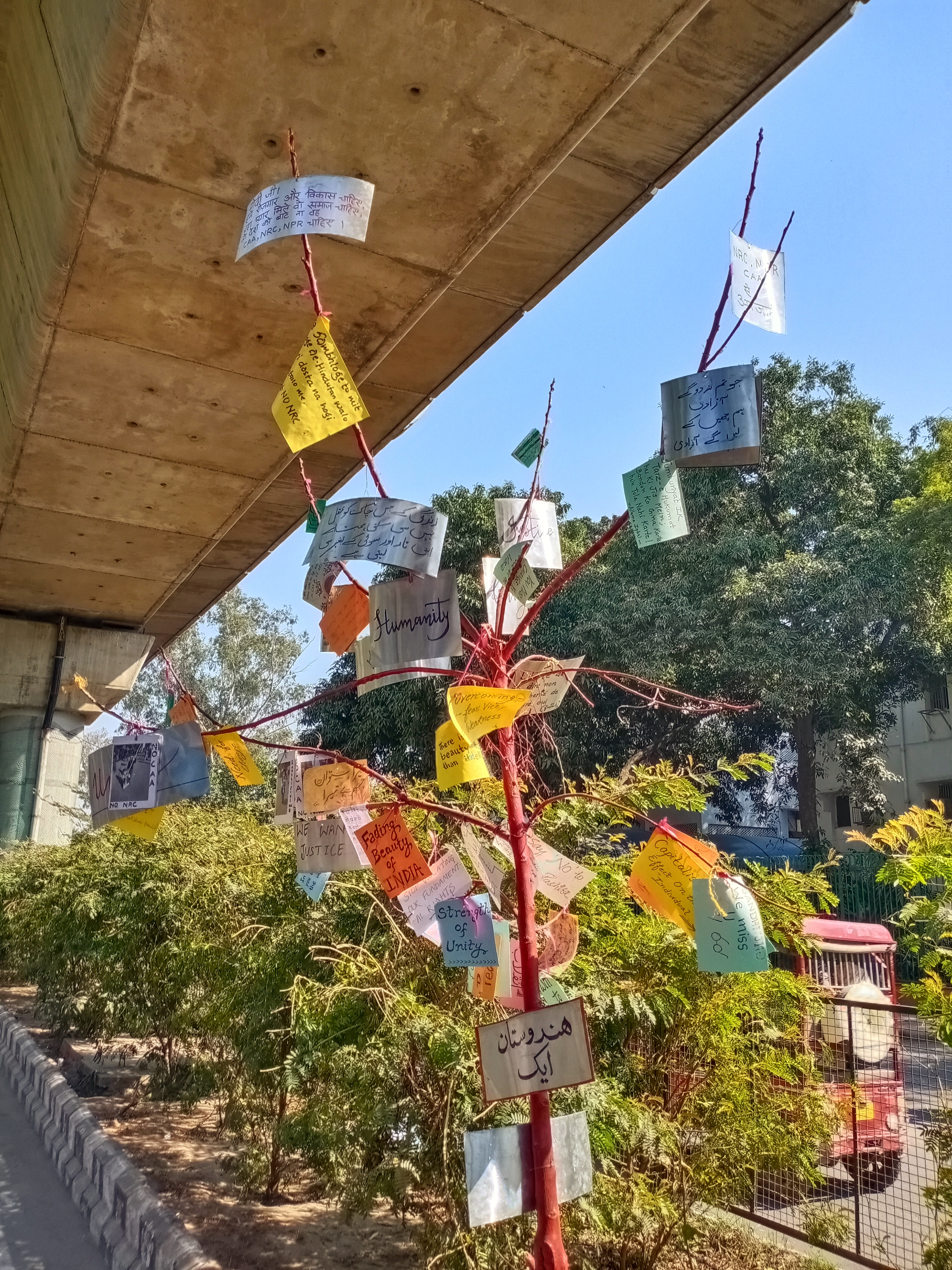
A protest tree outside the Jamia Millia Islamia campus on 15 February 2020

Protests were held in solidarity with Jamia students in several major universities across the subcontinent, including IIM Ahmedabad, Banaras Hindu University, Dhaka University, and IIT Bombay. Over 400 scholars from US universities including Harvard, Yale, Columbia, Stanford, and Tufts issued a joint statement expressing solidarity with Jamia students.

JNU Teachers Association, along with the Jamia Teachers Association, held a candle march at India Gate on the evening of 23 December in protest against the unethical action taken by the administration against the students of Jamia and the beating of students by entering the college campus.

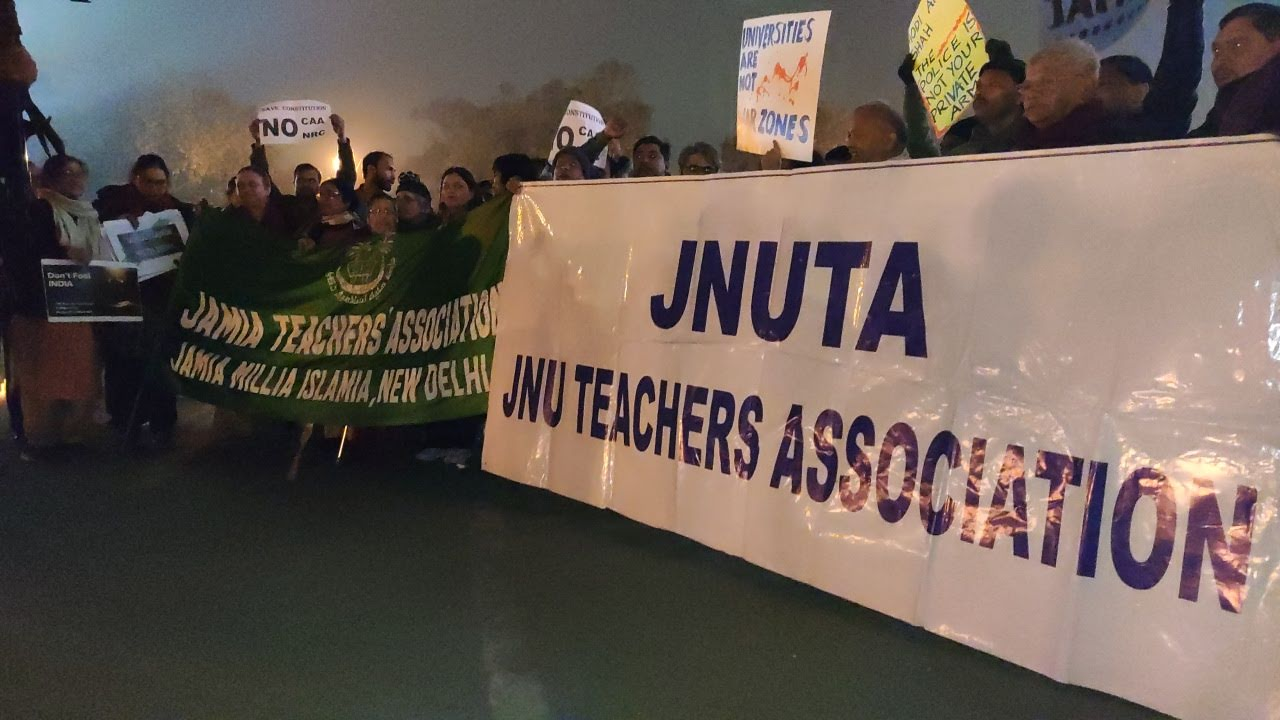
Jamia Teacher's Association along with JNU Teacher's Association staged a candle marched at India Gate.

Popular personality and leaders like Shashi Tharoor, Medha Patkar, Tushar Gandhi, Kanhaiya Kumar, Umar Khalid, Najeeb Jung Arundhati Roy and Swara Bhaskar joined the student protest and address the students at gate no. 7 of Jamia Millia Islamia.

Bollywood director and producer Anurag Kashyap also came to visit the protest site of Jamia and interact with students. In his speech at the protest site, he said that he was excited to see the students of this country still alive and making their mark for rights and freedom in a democratic manner. He also raised the slogan of 'Inquilab Zindabad'.

Congress leader Shashi Tharoor, Hindi Film Director Anurag Kashyap and former Delhi Governor and former JMI VC Najeeb Jung addressed students at a protest site in Jamia.

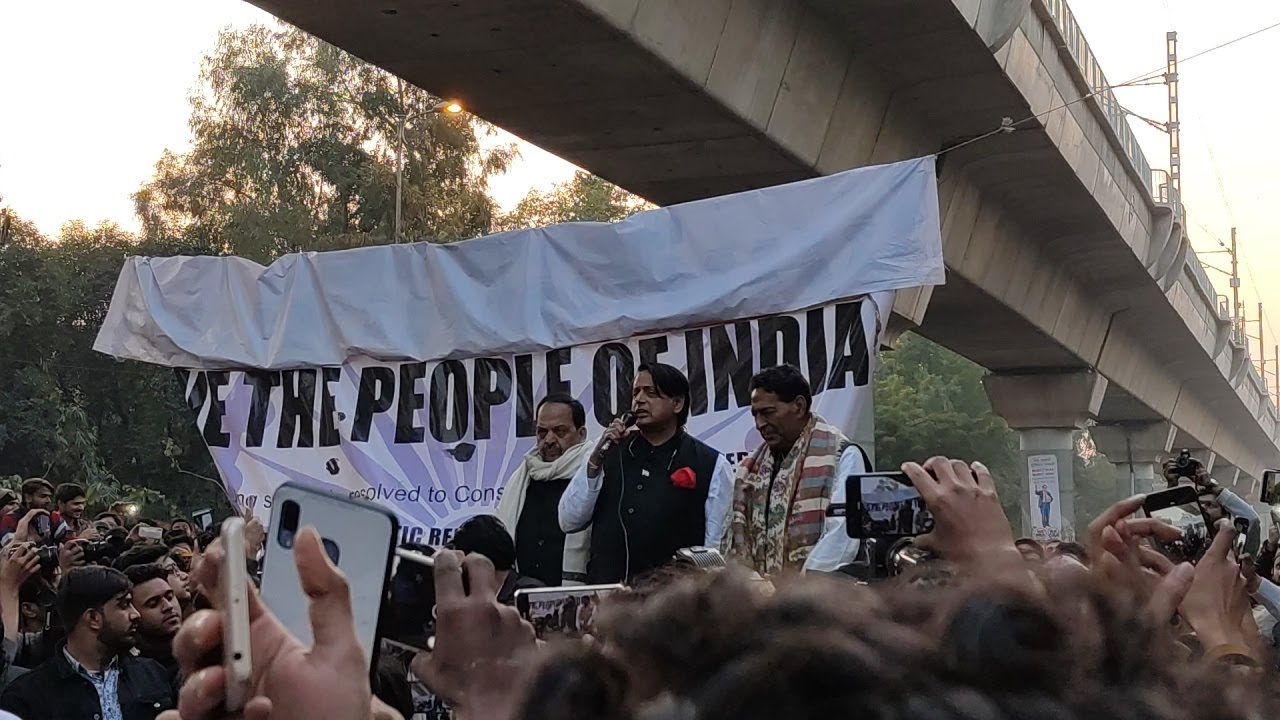

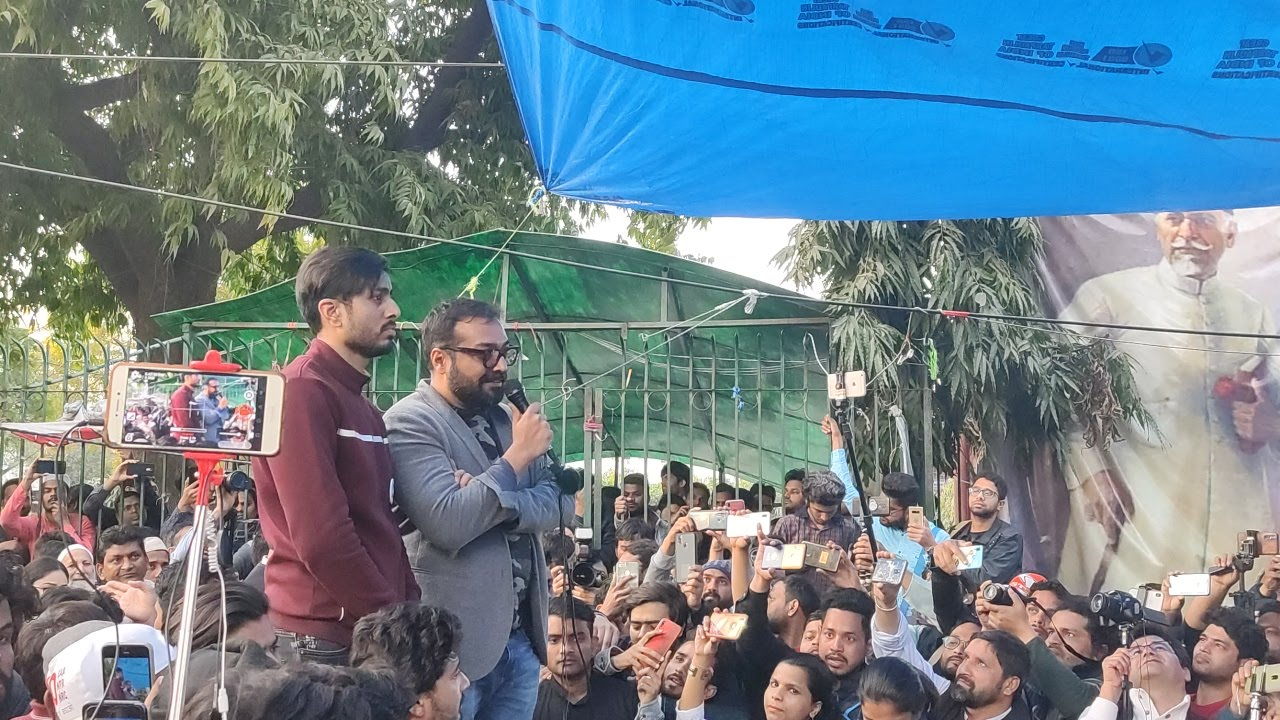

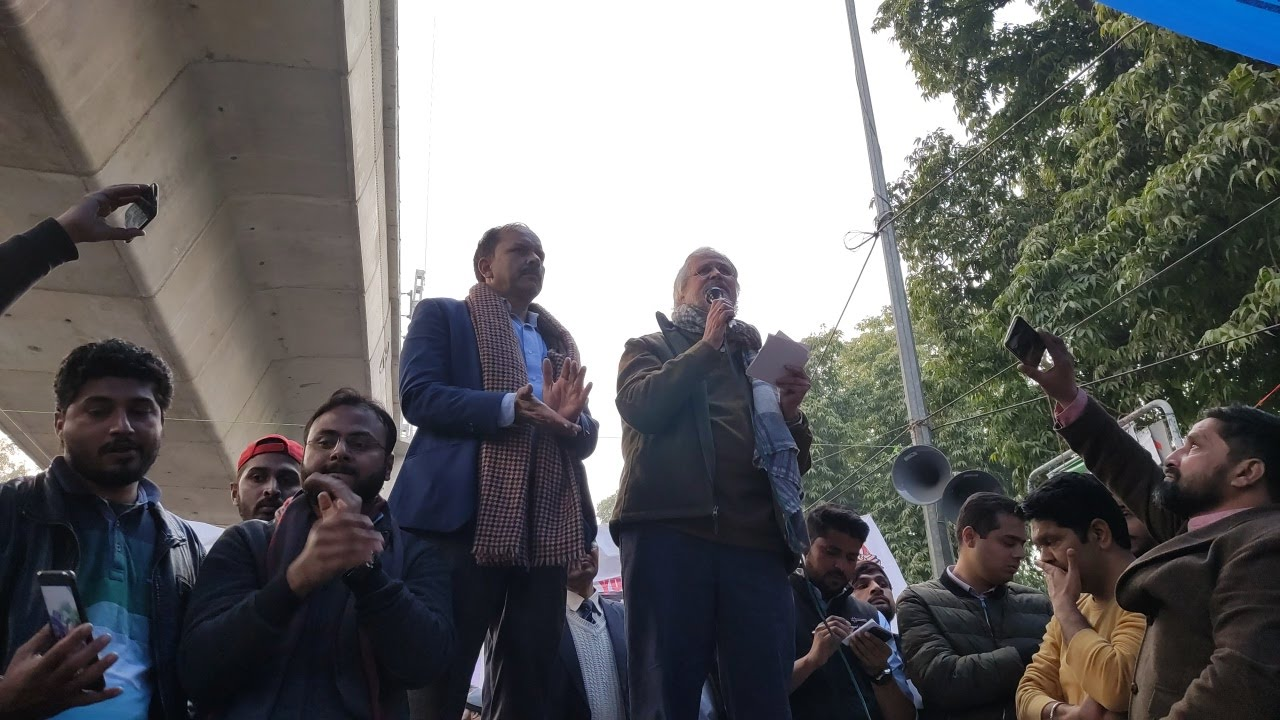

=== Further violence ===
A juvenile Hindu nationalist opened fire at a protest at the Jamia Millia Islamia, injuring one student. The event happened on the 72nd anniversary of the assassination of Mahatma Gandhi, also by a Hindu nationalist. He was arrested and charged with attempted murder. The man shouted slogans of "Jai Shri Ram" (Victory to Lord Rama) and "Delhi Police Zindabad" (Long live Delhi police). Before opening fire at the protestors, the attacker shouted "Kisko chahiye Azadi? Main Dunga Azadi" (Who wants freedom? I will give freedom).

On 2 February 2020, late at night when people were protesting, two unidentified men fired shots near gate 5 of the university, the third attack in the area after the second attack during the Shaheen Bagh protest. Though there was no casualty reported.

== Protest called off ==
The Protests outside Jamia were called off by students in the initial weeks of the coronavirus outbreak and Delhi CM Arvind Kejriwal announced a lockdown as a precautionary measure to contain the coronavirus.

== See also ==
- Campus violence in India
- JNU attack

== Video links ==
- Interview with a victim who was blinded in one eye during the attack by The Caravan magazine.
- CCTV footage of police brutality in old reading hall, M.A/MPhill section Jamia Library by Jamia Coordination Committee (JCC).
- Extended footage of Delhi Police brutality in PG reading room, Jamia Library by The Maktoob Media.
- Footage from Jamia Library shows cops trying to vandalise CCTV by The Quint
- Jamia Students Take Cover In Library As Police Fire Tear Gas by The NDTV
- Media misreport wallet as ‘stone’ in student's hand by the AltNews.in
