= Alok Bhattacharya =

Indian parasitologist

- Born: 2 February 1951 (age 75); Delhi, India
- Education: Hans Raj College (Delhi University); Indian Institute of Technology, Kanpur; Jawaharlal Nehru University, Delhi
- Awards: 1994 Shanti Swarup Bhatnagar Prize; 2015 INSA Aryabhatta Medal
- Scientific career
- Fields: Parasitology; Genomics; Bioinformatics
- Workplaces: Jawaharlal Nehru University; National Cancer Institute; Harvard Medical School; All India Institute of Medical Sciences Delhi; Tata Consultancy Services
- Doctoral advisor: Asis Datta

Alok Bhattacharya (born 2 February 1951) is an Indian parasitologist, academic and a professor at the School of Life Sciences of the Jawaharlal Nehru University. He chairs the Biotechnology Information System Network (BITSNET) as well as the Life Sciences Expert Committee of FIST program of the Department of Science and Technology (DST). He is an elected fellow of the Indian Academy of Sciences and the Indian National Science Academy and is known for his studies on Entamoeba histolytica and species-specific calcium binding protein and its gene.

The Council of Scientific and Industrial Research, the apex agency of the Government of India for scientific research, awarded him the Shanti Swarup Bhatnagar Prize for Science and Technology, one of the highest Indian science awards, in 1994, for his contributions to biological sciences.

== Biography ==
Alok Bhattacharya, born on 2 February 1951, did his graduate studies in science at Hansraj College of the University of Delhi and obtained a master's degree in chemistry from the Indian Institute of Technology, Kanpur in 1972. Subsequently, he did his doctoral research at the School of Life Sciences, Jawaharlal Nehru University (JNU) under the guidance of Asis Datta, a renowned geneticist and Padma Bhushan laureate, to secure a PhD in 1976. He moved to the US for his post-doctoral studies which he did at the Laboratory of Pathophysiology of National Cancer Institute during 1977–79 and at the Springer Lab of Harvard Medical School from 1979 to 1981. Returning to India the same year, he joined the All India Institute of Medical Sciences Delhi and worked there as a senior research officer at the Department of Biochemistry till 1982 when he joined Tata Research Development and Design Centre of the Tata Consultancy Services located in Pune, where he worked till 1985. In 1986, Bhattacharya had a short stint at the Laboratory of Parasitic Diseases of the National Institutes of Health as a guest researcher, after which he joined his alma mater, Jawaharlal Nehru University, as an associate professor at their School of Life Sciences, where he is the incumbent professor and adjunct faculty. During his service at JNU, he held various positions, including that of the coordinator of Bioinformatics Centre (1998–2008), dean of School of Life Sciences (2002–2004) and the dean of School of Information Technology (2004–2008). He is also a professor of life sciences at Shiv Nadar University, Dadri and a visiting faculty at Banaras Hindu University.

Alok Bhattacharya is married to Sudha Bhattacharya, a known parasitologist. She is a professor at Jawaharlal Nehru University and is a co-author of some of his publications. The couple lives in Delhi.

== Legacy ==
Entamoeba histolytica life cycle

Bhattacharya's researches were focused on parasitology, computation biology and bioinformatics, with special focus on the biology of Entamoeba histolytica, an anaerobic parasitic protozoan causing amoebiasis. His studies elucidated the molecular mechanisms during the opsonization process of the pathogen and identified new proteins such as EhCaBP1, EhCaBP3 and EhC2PK which play a role in the phagocytosis and actin dynamics of the parasite. His team developed new genomic tools and also proposed new algorithms for the identification of genomic variations. His work on lipophosphoglycan and its identification and characterization as well as on the species-specific calcium binding protein and its gene are reported to have been pioneering. These studies are known to have widened the understanding of the pathogenesis of the protozoan at the molecular level. For pursuing his researches on Entamoeba histolytica, he founded a dedicated laboratory at JNU. He has also worked on the pathogenesis of malaria and visceral leishmaniasis (kala-azar) and his researches are documented in a number of articles of which 188 have been listed by ResearchGate, an online repository of scientific articles.

Bhattacharya is associated with the Department of Science and Technology (DST) and is the chairman of two of DST's initiatives. Biotechnology Information System Network, a bioinformatics program for establishing a centralised database and nationwide network of affiliated organizations is one while the other is Fund for Improvement of S&T Infrastructure in Universities and other Higher Educational Institutions (FIST) where he heads the Expert Committee on Life Sciences. He is a member of Guha Research Conference and a former vice president of the Indian National Science Academy (2011–13). He serves as a member of the governing council of the Council of Scientific and Industrial Research (CSIR), as a member of CSIR Society and as a member of the research councils of Institute of Himalayan Bioresource Technology and Central Salt and Marine Chemicals Research Institute, both constituent laboratories of CSIR. He sits in the USER committee of the Department of Science and Technology and chairs the Task force on Bioinformatics, Computation Biology and Systems Biology of the Department of Biotechnology. He is the managing trustee of GNE-Myopathy International, a forum of patients who suffer from GNE-Myopathy, a genetic disorder affecting young people and is associated with several science journals including Parasitology International, Journal of Biosciences, Genome Analysis, Bioinformatics: From Molecules to systems, International Journal of Integrative Biology, PLoS Neglected Tropical Diseases and Nature.

Bhattacharya is a former vice president (2009–10) of the Society of Biological Chemists (India), a science society based at the Indian Institute of Science, serves as a member for internal expert panel of the Council of Indian Institutes of Technology and is involved with the Project AMOEBAC of the Infect-ERA, a global organization for researches on human infectious diseases. He has delivered several guest lectures and keynote addresses and is a member of the Scientific Advisory Committee of the National Symposium on Bioinformatics and Computational Systems Biology organized by the National Network for Mathematical and Computational Biology (NNMCB) of the Department of Science and Technology to be held during 12–14 November 2016 at Central University of Himachal Pradesh. He has also mentored research scholars in their doctoral researches.

== Awards and honors ==
Bhattacharya, a Robert McNamara Fellow of the World Bank (1985–86), was awarded the Shanti Swarup Bhatnagar Prize, one of the highest Indian science awards, by the Council of Scientific and Industrial Research in 1994. He is also a recipient of Science Exhibition Award of Delhi University in 1968 and 1969 and the Rockefeller Biotechnology Career Development Award for 1988–1990. He is a J.C. Bose National Fellow of the Department of Science and Technology, India and an elected fellow of the Indian National Science Academy and the Indian Academy of Sciences. He received the Aryabhatta Medal of the Indian National Science Academy in 2015.

== Selected bibliography ==
- Arpita Saha; Sudha Bhattacharya; Alok Bhattacharya (June 2016). "Serum stress responsive gene EhslncRNA of Entamoeba histolytica is a novel long noncoding RNA". Scientific Reports. 6 27476. Bibcode:2016NatSR...627476S. doi:10.1038/srep27476. PMC 4895391. PMID 27273618.
- Sarbashis Das; Fredrik Pettersson; Phani Rama Krishna Behra; Malavika Ramesh; Santanu Dasgupta; Alok Bhattacharya; Leif A Kirsebom (March 2016). "The Mycobacterium phlei Genome: Expectations and Surprises". Genome Biology and Evolution. 8 (4): 975–85. doi:10.1093/gbe/evw049. PMC 4860684. PMID 26941228.
- M Shahid Mansuri; Mrigya Babuta; Sabir Ali; Alok Bhattacharya (January 2016). "Autophosphorylation at Thr279 of Entamoeba histolytica atypical kinase EhAK1 is required for activity and regulation of erythrophagocytosis". Scientific Reports. 6 16969. Bibcode:2016NatSR...616969M. doi:10.1038/srep16969. PMC 4703981. PMID 26739245.
- Arpita Saha; Amit Kumar Gaurav; Sudha Bhattacharya; Alok Bhattacharya (September 2015). "Molecular Basis of Pathogenesis in Amoebiasis". Curr Clin Micro RPT. 2 (4): 143–154. doi:10.1007/s40588-015-0023-1. S2CID 16992427.
- Jamaluddin Ahamad; Sandeep Ojha; Ankita Srivastava; Alok Bhattacharya; Sudha Bhattacharya (August 2015). "Post-transcriptional regulation of ribosomal protein genes during serum starvation in Entamoeba histolytica". Molecular and Biochemical Parasitology. 201 (2): 146–152. doi:10.1016/j.molbiopara.2015.07.006. PMID 26247142.
- M Shahid Mansuri; Sudha Bhattacharya; Alok Bhattacharya (October 2014). "A Novel Alpha Kinase EhAK1 Phosphorylates Actin and Regulates Phagocytosis in Entamoeba histolytica". PLOS Pathogens. 10 (10) e1004411. doi:10.1371/journal.ppat.1004411. PMC 4192601. PMID 25299184.
- Katherine S Ralston; Michael D Solga; Nicole M Mackey-Lawrence; Somlata; Alok Bhattacharya; William A Petri (April 2014). "Trogocytosis by Entamoeba histolytica contributes to cell killing and tissue invasion". Nature. 508 (7497): 526–530. Bibcode:2014Natur.508..526R. doi:10.1038/nature13242. PMC 4006097. PMID 24717428.
- Ankita Srivastava; Jamaluddin Ahamad; Ashwini Kumar Ray; Devinder Kaur; Alok Bhattacharya; Sudha Bhattacharya (February 2014). "Analysis of U3 snoRNA and small subunit processome components in the parasitic protist Entamoeba histolytica". Molecular and Biochemical Parasitology. 193 (2): 82–92. doi:10.1016/j.molbiopara.2014.03.001. PMID 24631428.

== See also ==
- Sudha Bhattacharya
- Veena Tandon
- Hereditary inclusion body myopathy
- Entamoeba histolytica
- Asis Datta
