= Fault Lines in the Faith =

2023 book by Syed Iqbal Hasnain

Fault Lines in the Faith: How Events of 1979 Shaped the Islamic World
- Author: Syed Iqbal Hasnain
- Language: English
- Publisher: Rupa Publications
- Publication date: 2023
- Publication place: India
- Media type: Book
- Pages: 320
- ISBN: 9789357029001

Fault Lines in the Faith: Show Events of 1979 Shaped the Islamic World is a book written by Syed Iqbal Hasnain. It was published in 2023 by Rupa Publications India Pvt. Limited. The book deeply covers the three incidents happened in the Middle East that shaped the contemporary Muslim world. The three incidents are Iranian revolution led by Ayatollah Khomeini, the seizure of Grand Mosque of Mecca by Juhayman al-Otaybi and the Soviet Union's invasion of Afghanistan.

== Chapters ==
The first chapter in the book analyses how Wahhabism doctrines affected the Global Jihadism. It provides a scene of the Saudi Arabia's religious and political angle. It focuses on how a pact between Muhammad Ibn Abdul Wahhab Najdi and Ibn Saud mutually helped both of them in their ways. He concludes, Sufism is the solution.

== Reception ==
Jamia Hamdard University hosted a discussion on the book which initiated with the recitation from the Quran by A. M. Farooqui, Imam of Rabea Mosque. The guests were welcomed by Syeedun Nisa, and keynote address was delivered by S. M. Azizuddin Hussain while Dr. M Afshar Alam presided over the session.

== Reviews ==
The book has been reviewed by Dr. P.S. Jayaramu of Mainstream Weekly, Saleem Rashid Shah of New Indian Express, M Rajivlochan of Tribune India, Swapna Peri of Storizen, Tabish Khair of The Frontline.
