= Santishree Dhulipudi Pandit =

13th Vice Chancellor of Jawaharlal Nehru University

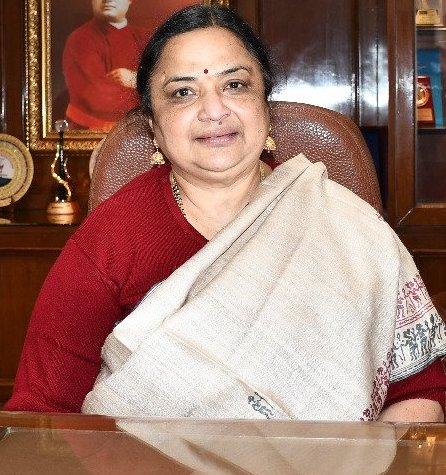

Vice-Chancellor of Jawaharlal Nehru University
- Incumbent
- Assumed office 7 February 2022
- Preceded by: M. Jagadesh Kumar

Personal details
- Born: 15 July 1962 (age 64) Leningrad, Soviet Union (present day Saint Petersburg, Russia)
- Parents: Dhulipudi Anjaneyulu; Mulamoodi Adilakshmi
- Education: PhD in International Relations
- Alma mater: University of Madras (BA, MA), Jawaharlal Nehru University (PhD)

Santishree Dhulipudi Pandit (born 15 July 1962) is an Indian academic and the current Vice-chancellor of Jawaharlal Nehru University, New Delhi(JNU).She is the first woman to hold the office. She previously served as Professor of Political Science at Savitribai Phule Pune University. She was appointed as 13th Vice Chancellor of Jawaharlal Nehru University by Ministry of Education on February 7, 2022

== Early life and education ==
Santishree Dhulipudi Pandit was born on 15 July 1962 in Leningrad, Soviet Union (present day Saint Petersburg, Russia). Her father is an IAS and mother is professor. She did her BA and MA from Presidency College, Chennai and completed M.Phil. and PhD in International relations from School of International studies at Jawaharlal Nehru University. She also received a Diploma in Social Work from California State University, Long Beach and postgraduate diploma in Peace and Conflict studies from Uppsala University.
