= M. Jagadesh Kumar =

Indian academician

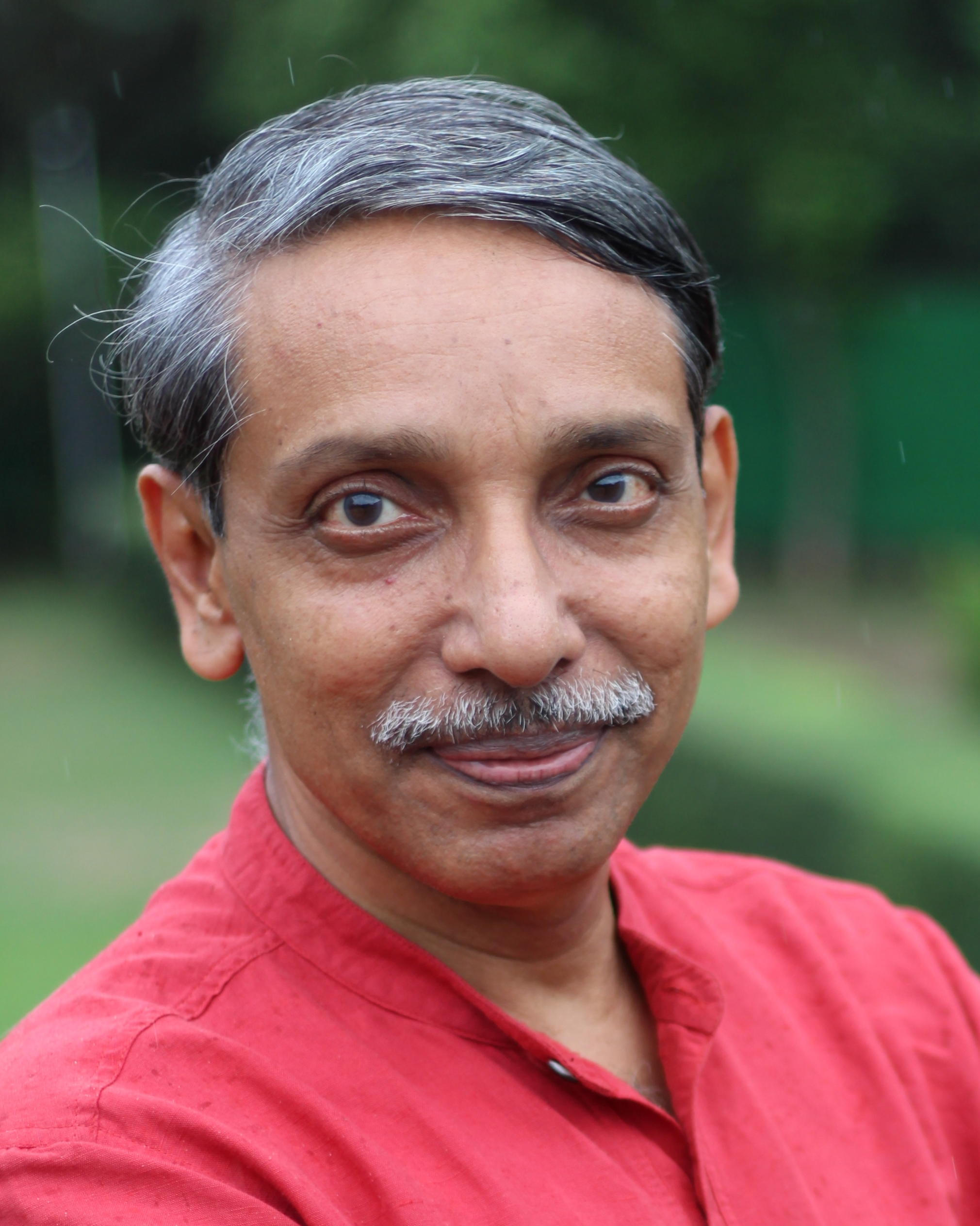

Chairperson of IIM Calcutta
- Incumbent
- Assumed office 5 March 2026
- Preceded by: Shrikrishna G. Kulkarni

Chairman of the University Grants Commission
- In office 4 February 2022 – 4 March 2026
- Preceded by: D.P. Singh
- Succeeded by: Vineet Joshi (acting)

Vice-Chancellor of Jawaharlal Nehru University
- In office 28 January 2016 – 3 February 2022
- Preceded by: Sudhir Kumar Sopory
- Succeeded by: Santishree Dhulipudi Pandit

Personal details
- Born: 8 April 1960 (age 66) Mamidyala, Telangana, India
- Education: M. Sc and PhD in Electrical Engineering
- Alma mater: IIT Madras
- Occupation: Academic, Professor

Mamidala Jagadesh Kumar (born 8 April 1960) is an Indian academic, electrical engineer and education administrator. He is the former Chairman of University Grants Commission, serving from February 2022 to April 2025. He served as a professor in the Department of Electrical Engineering at IIT Delhi. Kumar was the Vice-Chancellor of Jawaharlal Nehru University from January 2016 till 2022.

== Life, education and career ==
Kumar was born in Mamidala village in Tipparthi mandal, Nalgonda district, Telangana. He did his Masters and PhD in Electrical Engineering from Indian Institute of Technology, Madras, followed by post doctoral research at University of Waterloo, Canada. He works in the area of nanoscience and nanotechnology (nano-electronic devices, nanoscale devices, device design and power semiconductor devices). He is currently a fellow at Institution of Electronics and Telecommunication Engineers, National Academy of Sciences, India and Indian National Academy of Engineering among others. He is Chairman of the governing body of National Council of Science Museums. He has received the "ISA-VSI TechnoMentor Award", with the award being presented by Dr. R. Chidambaram (Principal Scientific Advisor to Government of India).

He was selected as the Vice-Chancellor of Jawaharlal Nehru University from among four others including Rameshwar Nath Koul Bamezai, Virander Singh Chauhan and Ramakrishna Ramaswamy.

During his tenure as VC, he has often been in the news for many controversies happening on his watch such as the 2016 JNU sedition row, the disappearance of a student Najeeb Ahmad and the 2020 JNU attacks. Critics say that he is "implementing the agenda of the RSS", the reason why he has been made VC in the first place. JNU Students' Unions called for his resignation following the attacks on JNU in January 2020.

== Awards ==
He has been awarded the Padma Shri in 2026 by the Government of India for his contribution in the field of literature and education.

== Bibliography ==
Co-Authored three books with research students:

- Mamidala Jagadesh Kumar, Pratyush Pandey, and Rajat Vishnoi (November 2016). Tunnel Field-effect Transistors (TFET): Modelling and Simulation. Wiley, UK
- Mamidala Jagadesh Kumar and Sneh Saurabh (November 2016). Fundamentals of Tunnel Field-Effect Transistors. CRC Press (Taylor & Francis)
- Mamidala Jagadesh Kumar and Shubham Sahay (February 2019). Junctionless Field-Effect Transistors: Design, Modeling, and Simulation. Wiley-IEEE Press, USA
