= Sudha Bhattacharya =

Indian biologist

- Born: March 7, 1952 (age 74)
- Education: B.Sc (Hons) from University of Delhi, M.Sc, PhD from Indian Agricultural Research Institute and Post-doctoral from Stanford University
- Occupations: Molecular Biologist, Academic, Scientist, Writer
- Employer: Jawaharlal Nehru University
- Known for: Work on understanding gene organisation and expression in Entamoeba histolytica
- Spouse: Alok Bhattacharya

Sudha Bhattacharya (born 7 March 1952) is an Indian academic, scientist and a writer. She is recognized primarily for her in-depth study of Entamoeba histolytica, a parasitic protozoan that causes amoebiasis: Dr. Bhattacharya's laboratory first detected Ribosomal RNA genes on Circular DNA, while studying the parasite, and also discovered families of retrotransposons in the parasite genome. Her work has primarily been in the fields of Molecular Parasitology and Gene Regulation.

Bhattacharya is a professor at the School of Environmental Sciences, Jawaharlal Nehru University (JNU). She is a fellow at The National Academy of Sciences, India, Indian Academy of Sciences and Indian National Science Academy (2014).

== Education and career ==
Sudha Bhattacharya attended University of Delhi where she graduated with a BSc.(Hons) degree in Botany in the year 1971 and then proceeded to the Indian Agricultural Research Institute, New Delhi where she obtained her MSc. in Biochemistry and Molecular Biology. She completed her post-graduation in 1973 and then, in 1977, earned a Ph. D. for research on regulation of RNA synthesis in Escherichia coli. She has conducted post-doctoral research on bacteriophage genetics at Stanford University (1977–79), bacterial DNA replication at the Boston Biomedical Research Institute (1979-1981) and studied axenic cultivation at the National Institutes of Health (1985–86).

Prior to joining the Jawaharlal Nehru University, Bhattacharya has worked at the All India Institute of Medical Sciences as a research officer from 1981–82 and at the Tata Research Development and Design Centre as a scientist from 1982-85 to research on DNA-based diagnostic methods for common diseases. She joined JNU in 1986 as an Assistant Professor and set up her lab to study E. histolytica. She has also served on the academic committee of various boards affiliated to JNU. In her attempt towards recognising environmentalists who rely on traditional knowledge, she found Jadhav Payeng from Assam who converted 1,00 acres of dense land into a forest for rhinos and elephants.

== Academic and Research Achievements ==
Dr. Bhattacharya received global acclaim for her novel findings in the field of simple molecular biology of E. Histolytica. Her lab found the existence of ribosomal RNA genes on round DNA, and located families of retrotransposons inside the parasite genome. Study on the replication of rDNA established the existence of replication origins inside the rDNA circle, which were differentially used in response to growth strain. Expression evaluation of rRNA and r-proteins discovered the post-transcriptional regulation of ribosomal biogenesis. Her work on retrotransposons confirmed that retrotransposition is observed by means of excessive frequency recombination- which could contribute to series polymorphism determined in retrotransposons. Her lab also applied the widespread insertion site polymorphism of retrotransposons to broaden a way for pressure typing of E. Histolytica clinical isolates.

== Awards and honours ==
- Robert McNamara Fellowship, World Bank (1985)
- Rockefeller Biotechnology Career Development Award (1987)
- Fogarty International Research Collaboration Award (1996 and 2001)
- Fellow of Indian Academy of Sciences (2001), National Academy of Sciences, India (2008) and Indian National Science Academy (2014)
- J.C. Bose National Fellow (2015)
- Member of the Guha Research Conference (1993)

== Other contributions ==
Dr. Bhattacharya has served in the Academic Committees of various JNU-affiliated Institutes such as CDRI, ICGEB to name few. She served as Dean, School of Environmental Sciences (2010–12) and played a major role in the all-round improvement of the academic programme. She has been a sectional committee member of the Animal and Plant Science committee of Indian Academy of Sciences, Bangalore and is currently nominated to its Council. She is member Sectional Committee X of INSA; member Research committee, Animal Sciences & Biotechnology, CSIR; member, Animal Science Program Advisory Committee, SERB; member Governing body of SN Bose National Center of Basic Science, Kolkata; member Scientific Advisory committee, Institute of Pathology, New Delhi; member Editorial Board of J. Bioscience.

== See also ==
- Alok Bhattacharya
