= Franson Manjali =

Indian professor of linguistics

Franson Davis Manjali
- Born: Mysore, India

Education
- Education: Jawaharlal Nehru University

Philosophical work
- School: Continental philosophy; Deconstruction; Buddhism; Indian philosophy
- Institutions: Jawaharlal Nehru University; IIMC; Université de Paris; École des Hautes Études en Sciences Sociales
- Main interests: Ethics, aesthetics, linguistics

Franson Davis Manjali was an Indian professor of linguistics, translator and editor. His work was based on the philosophy of language in the tradition of Martin Heidegger, Friedrich Nietzsche, Immanuel Kant and, most importantly, Jacques Derrida and Jean-Luc Nancy. He was a professor of linguistics at Jawaharlal Nehru University in India and retired in 2020. He died on 14 June 2023 in New Delhi, India.

== Bibliography ==
=== Books authored, edited and translated (titles in English) ===
- (edited) with Marc Crépon, Philosophy, Language and the Political - Poststructuralism in Perspective, New Delhi: Aakar Books, 2018.
- Labyrinths of Language - Philosophical and Cultural Investigations, New Delhi: Aakar Books, 2014.
- (translated) Philosophical Chronicles. Translation of the French book Chroniques Philosophiques by Jean-Luc Nancy, New York: Fordham University Press. 2008.
- Language, Discourse and Culture: Contemporary Philosophical Perspectives. New Delhi: Anthem Press, 2007.
- Literature and Infinity. Shimla: Indian Institute of Advanced Study, 2001.
- Meaning, Culture and Cognition. New Delhi: Bahri Publications, 2000.
- Nuclear Semantics — Towards a Theory of Relational Meaning. New Delhi: Bahri Publications, 1991.
- (edited) Poststructuralism and Cultural Theory: The Linguistic Turn and Beyond. Allied Publishers, New Delhi, 2006.
- (edited) Nietzsche: Philologist, Philosopher and Cultural Critic. Allied Publishers, New Delhi, 2006. (This book is reviewed in Journal of Indian Council of Philosophical Research, vol. 24, 1, 2007, pp. 252–53)
- (edited). Language, Culture and Cognition. New Delhi: Bahri Publications, 1998. (Also published as a special issue of International Journal of Communication, Vol. 7, 1997.)
- (edited). Language and Cognition. New Delhi: Bahri Publications. 1993. (Also published as a special issue of International Journal of Communication, Vol. 2, 1992.)
- (edited). Language, Society and Discourse. New Delhi: Bahri Publications. 1992 (Also published as a special issue of the journal Language Forum, Vol. 17, Dec. 1991.)
- (translated) Morphogenesis of Meaning. (Translation of the French book Morphogenèse du sens by Jean Petitot; Paris: PUF, 1985). Berne: Peter Lang. 2004.
