= Anjana Sinha =

Indian police officer

Anjana Sinha IPS

Director of National Industrial Security Academy
- Preceded by: Jagbir Singh

Personal details
- Education: Lady Shri Ram College; Jawaharlal Nehru University; Indian Institute of Management Bangalore; Sardar Vallabhbhai Patel National Police Academy

Anjana Sinha is an Indian Police Service 1990-batch officer from Andhra Pradesh-cadre. She is currently on Government of India deputation to Central Industrial Security Force at the rank of Inspector General and serves as the director of National Industrial Security Academy, Hyderabad.

== Education ==
Sinha graduated with Bachelor of Arts in History from Lady Shri Ram College, University of Delhi. She completed her Master of Arts from Jawaharlal Nehru University and Master of Business Administration from the Indian Institute of Management Bangalore with specialisation in public policy. She received Chevening Scholarship, funded by the United Kingdom's Foreign and Commonwealth Office, in Peacekeeping and International Capacity Building at University of Bradford.

== Career ==
Being at the rank of Additional Director General of Police (ADGP) Sinha was appointed by the Government of Andhra Pradesh in 2016 especially for dealing with crime against women in the state. Sinha applied twice for the deputation to Central Government from her state-cadre, first on 3 January 2016 and again on 26 December 2017. She is currently on central deputation to the Central Industrial Security Force at the rank of Inspector General serving as the director of National Industrial Security Academy in Hyderabad.
