= Syed Iqbal Hasnain =

- Occupations: Glaciologist; educationist
- Years active: ????–2010
- Notable work: Fault Lines in the Faith
- Awards: Padma Shri (2009)

Syed Iqbal Hasnain is an Indian glaciologist, writer, educationist and the Chairman of the Glacier and Climate Change Commission of the Government of Sikkim. He is a former vice chancellor of the University of Calicut and a member of the United Nations Environment Program Committee on Global Assessment of Black Carbon and Troposphere Ozone. He was awarded Padma Shri in 2009 for his contributions in advancing the science of glaciology in India. He had contributed to The Hindu Businessline, Down To Earth and The Economic Times.

Between 2002 and 2006, Hasnain served as a vice-chancellor (President) of the University of Calicut, India. Previously, he held the post of Professor of Glaciology, Jawaharlal Nehru University, where he introduced glaciology as a subject at the post-graduate research level.

== Books ==
- Hasnain, Syed Iqbal (1999). Himalayan Glaciers: Hydrology and Hydrochemistry. Allied Publishers. ISBN 978-81-7023-922-2.
- Hasnain, Syed Iqbal (2009). Muslims in North India: Frozen in the Past. Har-Anand Publications. ISBN 978-81-241-1410-0.
- Hasnain, Iqbal Syed (2023). Fault Lines in the Faith: How Events of 1979 Shaped the Islamic World. Rupa Publications India Pvt. Limited. ISBN 978-93-5702-900-1.
