= Asis Datta =

Indian biochemist and molecular biologist

- Born: 2 February 1944 (age 82); West Bengal, India
- Occupations: Molecular biologist Geneticist
- Years active: Since 1964
- Spouse: Kasturi Datta
- Awards: Padma Shri; Padma Bhushan; Shanti Swarup Bhatnagar Prize; Om Prakash Bhasin Award; TWAS Prize; Goyal Prize; Guha Memorial Award; G. D. Birla Award; Dr. Nitya Anand Endowment Award; FICCI Award; Ranbaxy Award; D. M. Bose Gold Medal; Indira Priyadarshini Award; R. D. Birla Award; Dr. B. R. Ambedkar Centenary Award; SBC Lifetime Achievement Award; P. C. Mahalanobis Memorial Award; Asutosh Mookerjee Medal; ISC Lifetime Achievement Award; BRS Lifetime achievement Award; Priyadarshini Gold Medal; G. M. Modi Science Award

Asis Datta is an Indian biochemist, molecular biologist and genetic engineer, known for his research on genetically modified foods and food nutritional security. He was the founding Director of the National Institute of Plant Genome Research and is credited with the discovery of genes that assist in extended preservation of fruits and vegetables. He is a recipient of the Shanti Swarup Bhatnagar Award, the highest Indian award and in the Science category, and was awarded the fourth highest civilian award of the Padma Shri, by the Government of India, in 1999. In 2008, he was included again in the Republic Day Honours list for the third highest civilian honour of the Padma Bhushan.

== Biography ==
Datta, born on 2 February 1944, secured a PhD from Calcutta University for his doctoral work done at Bose Institute. He later followed it up by obtaining the degree of Doctor of Science (DSc) from Calcutta University. His doctoral work at Bose Institute was facilitated by a fellowship from the Government of India from 1964 to 1968. After this he moved to New York as a research associate at the Public Health Research Institute to continue research till 1971. His next move was to the University of California, Los Angeles, as assistant virologist, where he spent three years. Returning to India in 1975, he joined Jawaharlal Nehru University (JNU) at its School of Life Sciences and rose to the rank of a professor in 1978. He held several positions at JNU such as that of the dean from 1983 to 1985 and that of the rector from 1993 to 1996, eventually becoming the vice chancellor of the university in 1996 and holding the post till 2002. During this period, he also served as visiting scientist at Roche Institute of Molecular Biology for two academic years, 1976–77 and 1980–81. In 2002, when the National Centre for Plant Genome Research was upgraded as an autonomous institution under a new name, National Institute of Plant Genome Research, Datta was appointed as its founder director. He worked at the institute till his superannuation in 2008. At the end of his official career, he was recognized as the emeritus professor by the Jawaharlal Nehru University and as the distinguished emeritus scientist and professor emeritus by the National Institute of Plant Genome Research.

== Positions ==
Datta has been associated with several central and state government and government-aided autonomous bodies in various positions. He chaired the Recruitment Assessment Board of the Council of Scientific and Industrial Research (CSIR) from 2003 to 2006 and has held the chair of the Integrated Long Term Programme (ILTP) of the Department of Science and Technology. He was the chairman of Scientific Advisory Committee (SAC) of the National Institute of Cholera and Enteric Diseases, Kolkata from 2005 to 2007 and has been holding the chair of the Scientific Advisory Committee of the Vector Control Research Centre, Puducherry from 2007 till date. He has served as a member of the Scientific Advisory Committee of the Prime Minister of India and was involved in the Tenth Five–Year Plan of India as a member of the Steering Committee on Science and Technology of the Planning Commission. He was also a member of the Steering Committee of Biotechnology of the states of Maharashtra, Odisha, Madhya Pradesh and West Bengal.

Datta was the president of the Society of Biological Chemists in 2000 and the Indian Science Congress from 2003–2004 term. He sat in the governing body of the Council of Scientific and Industrial Research and the steering committee of the National Bioresource Board. He was associated with the Indian National Science Academy as its council member (2002–2004) and vice president, and the National Academy of Sciences, India (NASI) as its president (2009–2011). He served the Governing Bodies of the Indian Council of Agricultural Research (ICAR) (2007–2010) and the Indian Council of Medical Research (ICMR) 2007–2010, and has chaired the Biomedical Board of the latter. He has been a member of the Science and Technology Forum, Japan, the Review Committee of ICMR, the ICAR Society and the Board of Governors of the ICFAI University, Dehradun and the Indian Institute of Technology, Guwahati. He sits in the general bodies of National Institute of Technology, Silchar and the Academy of Scientific and Innovative Research, Chennai. He is also a President's nominee at University of Delhi, Central University of Hyderabad, Northeastern University.

== Career ==
Human tongue infected with oral candidiasis

Besides his academic contributions as a teacher, Datta is reported to have contributed in developing the Jawaharlal Nehru University by establishing schools and centres of excellence within the university. He is also credited with pioneering researches in the field of molecular biology. His researches on Candida albicans, a pathogenic variety of fungus which causes candidiasis, an infection to humans, have assisted in designing a drug to combat the disease. The team led by him have carried out biological researches which have applications in the fields of agriculture, medicine, science and industry; discovery of genes which helps in extending the shelf life of fruits and vegetables and development of genetically modified food are two such applications. His team was successful in receiving US patents, the first time an Indian firm receiving US patent for genes. His researches on the structure-function-application of eukaryotic genes paved way for the creation of the National Institute of Plant Genome Research, the first institute in India for genetic research. He has published several articles, documenting his researches, in peer reviewed journals and Google Scholar has listed 226 of them, with an h-index of 20 and i10-index of 35 (since 2010). He holds 7 Indian patents, 5 US patents and 5 patents of other countries for his research findings. He has also mentored over 45 research scholars in their doctoral research.

== Awards and honours ==
Datta is an elected Fellow of all the three major Indian science academies, Indian National Science Academy (1988), National Academy of Sciences, India (1991) and Indian Academy of Sciences (1992) The World Academy of Sciences (TWAS) also elected him as their Fellow in 1998. University of Burdwan conferred the degree of Doctor of Science (honoris causa) on him in 2002, and Bidhan Chandra Agricultural University, Vidyasagar University and Pandit Ravi Shankar Shukla University also awarded DSc to him in 2004, 2008 and 2017.

While working as a Professor at JNU, Datta was awarded Shanti Swarup Bhatnagar Prize, the highest Indian science award, by the Council of Scientific and Industrial Research, in 1980. Towards the end of 1980s and in early 90s, he received three awards, namely, Guha Memorial Award (1988), the inaugural G. D. Birla Award for Science and Technology (1991) and Dr. Nitya Anand Endowment Award of the Indian National Science Academy (1993). The Federation of Indian Chamber of Commerce and Industry awarded him their annual honour for research and development in Life Sciences in 1994 and he received the Om Prakash Bhasin Award in 1995. The TWAS Prize of the World Academy of Sciences reached him in 1996, the same year as he received three more awards, Goyal Prize, Ranbaxy Award in Medical Sciences and D. M Bose Gold Medal of the Indian Science News Association.

The Government of India awarded him the civilian honour of the Padma Shri in 1999; they would honour him again in 2008 with the Padma Bhushan. He received the R. D Birla Award for Biochemistry and Molecular Biology in 2001, Dr. B. R. Ambedkar Centenary Award for Excellence in Biomedical Research of the Indian Council of Medical Research in 2003 and the Lifetime Achievement of the Society of Biological Chemists in 2005. He was again honoured the same year by the West Bengal Government with P. C. Mahalanobis Memorial award. The Indian Science Congress awarded him the Asutosh Mookerjee Medal, the same year and followed it up with the Lifetime Achievement award in 2006. The year 2011 also brought him three awards, namely, Lifetime Achievement award of the Biotech Research Society, Priyadarshini Gold Medal and G. M. Modi Science Award. He has also delivered several award orations; Sir Amulya Rattan Oration, Bashambar Nath Chopra Lecture and Sir Edward Melbary Oration are a few among them.

== See also ==
- Bose Institute
- Public Health Research Institute
- Genetically modified food
- Alok Bhattacharya
