= Journal of Biosciences =

- Discipline: Biology
- Language: English
- Edited by: Prof. Renee Borges Indian Institute of Science, Bangalore

Publication details
- Former names: Proceedings of the Indian Academy of Sciences (Section B), Proceedings-Animal Sciences, Proceedings-Plant Sciences, Proceedings-Experimental Biology
- History: 1934-present
- Publisher: Indian Academy of Sciences (India)
- Frequency: Quarterly till 2019, Now CAP mode
- Open access: Yes
- Impact factor: 1.65 (2019)

Standard abbreviations
- ISO 4: J. Biosci.

Indexing
- CODEN: JOBSDN
- ISSN: 0250-5991 (print); 0973-7138 (web)
- LCCN: 2003209618
- OCLC no.: 05871960

Links
- Journal homepage

The Journal of Biosciences is a peer-reviewed scientific journal published by the Indian Academy of Sciences, Bengaluru, India. The current editor-in-chief is Prof. Renee Borges Indian Institute of Science, Bangalore. According to the Journal Citation Reports, the journal has a 2019 impact factor of 1.65.

== History ==
The Journal of Biosciences was established in 1934 as the Proceedings of the Indian Academy of Sciences (Section B). In 1978, the Proceedings were split into three sections: Proceedings-Animal Sciences, Proceedings-Plant Sciences, and Proceedings-Experimental Biology. The latter section was renamed Journal of Biosciences in 1979, and in 1991 it was merged again with the other two sections.

== Aim and Scope ==
The journal covers all areas of biology. It publishes research and reviews, series articles, perspectives, clipboards, commentaries, and short communications. Special theme issues are also published. The details of the editorial board is available at the link given below.

== Abstracting and indexing ==
The journal is abstracted and indexed in:

- Abstracts in Anthropology
- Academic OneFile
- Academic Search
- Aquatic Sciences and Fisheries Abstracts
- Biological Abstracts
- BIOSIS Previews
- CAB Abstracts
- Current Contents/Agriculture, Biology & Environmental Sciences
- Current Contents/ Life Sciences
- EBSCO databases
- Elsevier BIOBASE
- EMBASE
- GEOBASE
- Global Health
- Health Reference Center Academic
- Indian Science Abstracts
- IndMed
- INIS Atomindex
- International Bibliography of Periodical Literature
- MEDLINE/PubMed
- Science Citation Index
- Scopus
- The Zoological Record

== See also ==
- Open access in India
