= Campus violence in India =

Violence at universities and colleges in India

Student violence has become a serious issue for universities and colleges of India. The type of student violence can vary from political rivalries to shootings to sexual harassment.

== Incidents ==
=== Delhi, 1990 ===
In 1990, a student from Delhi called Rajiv Goswami self-immolated himself to protest against the reservations for the backward classes. This incident led to countrywide agitations against the then Prime Minister V.P.Singh.

=== Jamia Millia Islamia, 2000 ===
On 9 April 2000, two policemen came near Jamia Millia Islamia university campus to arrest two former students of the university for allegedly injuring another student earlier. Students in and around the spot interceded and did not let the police arrest the men. Later, the policemen emerged with reinforcements and entered the university library. The police randomly caught two students, leading to a fracas between the two parties. Incensed over police entry into the library without permission, the students started a road blockade outside the university. Police reinforcements increased and attempts were made to remove the protesting students which led to brick-batting by protesting students. The police resorted to lathi charge and firing tear gas shells. The students returned to their hostels after the intervention of the provost but around 300-500 policemen from several police stations across South Delhi emerged outside the hostel gate. The police then destroyed hostel property, beat students (especially Kashmiri students) and hurled communal remarks. The police desecrated a mosque inside the hostel premises and assaulted the Imam. A fact-finding report by People's Union for Democratic Rights called it "perhaps one of the worst ever incidents of police terror against students since the Emergency."

=== Kerala, 2007 ===
On 27 October 2007, a police officer was killed during a student clash inside the NSS Hindu College between ABVP and SFI activists in Changanassery, Kerala. The officer was hit by a wooden plank by the students.

=== Kerala, 2018 ===
In July 2018, an Islamist student leader stabbed and killed a communist student leader in Maharajas College, Kochi, Kerala. The incident took place when the two groups of students had a quarrel about displaying posters inside the campus. In March 2018, communist student activists attacked the residence of the principal of the MES Asmabi College, Kerala and wounded the principal seriously. The attackers were not arrested because they immediately escaped to some foreign country.

=== Mahatma Gandhi Central University, 2018 ===
On 13 September 2018, Shakti Babu, an undergraduate student of BA (Hindi Honours) at Mahatma Gandhi Central University was thrashed by some unidentified people as he was part of the students' core committee who were protesting against the Mahatma Gandhi Central University Vice-Chancellor (Arvind Agarwal) for his removal from university. He received internal injuries during the attack and was referred to Patna Medical College and Hospital for further treatment. He was getting threat calls for two days for raising voice against the Vice-Chancellor. A F.I.R was lodged against the Vice-Chancellor including the chief proctor and administrative secretary of university for the attack on him.

=== Kerala, 2019 ===
On 12 July 2019, communist students stabbed a student inside the University college campus in Thiruvananthapuram. The attack was carried out for the reason of "singing songs inside the campus along with lady students."

In Kerala Varma College, Thrissur, the principal had to leave his job when the Hindu right wing students created an issue about the communist students defiling Hindu gods in a campus poster.

As the political rivalries between the communist parties and the Hindu right wing students have disrupted the smooth running of the educational organizations all over the country. The issue is a bit more serious in southern states like Kerala where some students even resort to attacking the teachers and principals of the colleges.

=== Jamia Millia Islamia, 2019 ===
On 15 December, the Delhi Police entered the Jamia Milia Islamia University campus and allegedly assaulted several students after a mob of unidentified people set a few public buses on fire nearby. While police claimed they entered the campus to identify the agitators, several ground reports and eyewitnesses indicate that there was a brutal crackdown by Delhi Police on the Jamia campus. The testimonies from those present in Jamia Millia Islamia University on Sunday, suggest that the police targeted individuals indiscriminately, even entering the mosque on campus and hurting a local cleric.

=== Aligarh Muslim University, 2019 ===
On the same day as the Jamia Millia Islamia attack, police and Rapid Action Force injured several students — including some serious injuries — by firing tear-gas shells, rubber bullets, stun grenades and pellets at students of the Aligarh Muslim University protesting against the Citizenship Amendment Act. The security forces reportedly hurled communal abuses at the students. The forces fired tear gas shell inside hostel rooms and set ablaze vehicles belonging to students.

=== JNU, 2020 ===
On 5 January in the evening a masked mob with iron rods attacked the campus of Jawaharlal Nehru University, Delhi and injured students and teachers.

== Beneficial agitations ==
According to Ratnadeep Chakraborty, banning student unions alone cannot solve the issue of campus violence. Karnataka had tried banning students unions during 1989-1990 and that didn't help.

Student agitations can help the good movements of society as well. In August 2011, large number of students from different campuses of Delhi bunked classes and joined the anti corruption agitation of Anna Hazare.

In December 2012, student protests became widespread all over the country when a 21-year-old student was gang raped in a Delhi bus. Student politics is closely intertwined with Indian politics. In the 1920s a large number of students participated in the freedom fight against the British rulers. During Indira Gandhi's rule, student leaders were suppressed and 60 students from JNU were imprisoned for one year. Many Indian universities banned student organizations in this period.
