= Appa (title) =

Honorific title in Kannada

Appa (Marathi: अप्पा) (Kannada: ಅಪ್ಪ), (Telugu:అప్ప), (Tamil:அப்பா) is the meaning of father and was a honorific title conferred to the Headmen of Karnataka and Maharashtra regions in India. It was a title used to indicate administrator of a region which means 'head' or 'Father'. It is now used as a surname in certain regions of India, especially in the states of Maharashtra, Karnataka and Telangana whose family received it as a title.

== Historical rulers ==
- Chimaji Appa
- Shahaji Bhonsle(Appa Saheb)
- Raja Venkat appa Nayaka
- Mudhoji II of Nagpur
- Shiva Appa Nayaka

== Notable people ==
- C. Shiva appa
- Gurajada Apparao (1862–1915), Telugu poet and writer
- Meka Rangaiah Appa Rao (1915–2003), Indian politician
- Appa Rao Podile (born 1960), Indian scientist and educator
- Apparao M. Rao (fl. 2006–2016), Indian born physicist
- Shrirang Appa Barne, Shiv Sena politician
- Hage Appa, Indian politician
- Ramesh Appa Karad, Politician from Maharashtra.
- Appa Jalgaonkar, Maharashtrian harmonium player
- Appa Pant, Indian diplomat, Prince of Aundh, Gandhian, writer and freedom fighter.
- Shivraj Vishwanath Patil - Minister of Home Affairs of India (2004-2008) and 10th Speaker of the Lok Sabha (1991-1996)
- B.Siddalingappa.Yediyurappa Chief Minister of Karnataka
- S. Nijalingappa Chief Minister of Karnataka
- Jayadevappa Halappa Patel (H.D.Patel) Chief Minister of Karnataka
- Shiva Rudrappa Kanthi( S.R.Kanti) Chief Minister of Karnataka
- B.Donappa Jatti Chief Minister of Karnataka

== See also ==
- Maratha titles
