= Appa Rao =

Appa Rao or Apparao may refer to:

- Gurajada Apparao (1862–1915), Telugu poet and writer
- Meka Rangaiah Appa Rao (1915–2003), Indian politician
- Appa Rao Podile (born 1960), Indian scientist and educator
- Apparao M. Rao (fl. 2006–2016), Indian born physicist
