= Vemula (surname) =

Vemula (Telugu: వేముల) is a Telugu surname. Notable people with the surname include:

- Radhika Vemula, Indian activist
- Rohith Vemula (1989–2016), Indian PhD scholar
- Vemula Prashanth Reddy (born 1966), Indian politician
- Vemula Veeresham (born 1982), Indian politician
