= Dalit Spring =

Contemporary wave of anti-caste activism and social justice movements led by Dalits?

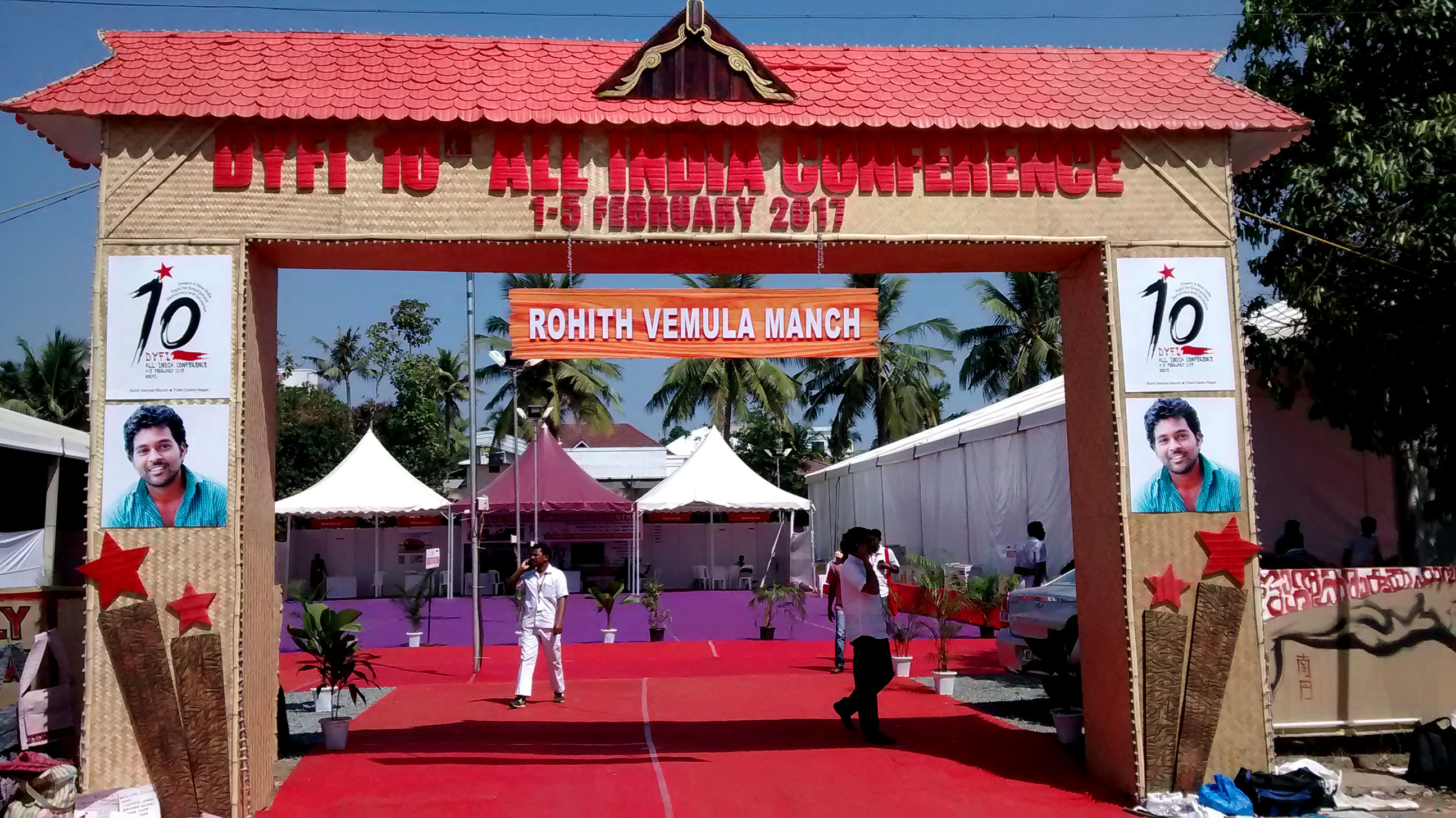
- Date: 2011-Present
- Location: India
- Participants: Protesters and Activist Groups and the Indian Government
- Deaths: 1

The "Dalit Spring" refers to a contemporary wave of anti-caste activism and social justice movements led by Dalits—historically marginalized communities in India classified as "Scheduled Castes"—that gained momentum in the early 2010s. Inspired in part by global uprisings such as the Arab Spring, the term draws a symbolic parallel to mass mobilizations for democratic rights and social equality. The phrase has been used to describe an upsurge in Dalit consciousness and protest, particularly amplified through social media, literature, journalism, and grassroots activism. Activists and scholars have pointed to the role of figures such as Meena Kandasamy, whose writing and digital presence catalyzed visibility for Dalit issues, blurring the lines between personal testimony and political critique. Her work, along with the broader activist journalism ecosystem, helped frame this movement as a “Dalit Spring” in the media and academia

== History ==
The roots of the Dalit Spring can be traced to longstanding traditions of anti-caste resistance in India, notably those influenced by B. R. Ambedkar, who advocated for social justice, education, and constitutional rights for Dalits. However, the Dalit Spring as a distinct phase of activism began to emerge in the early 2010s, catalyzed by the convergence of social media, independent journalism, and a new generation of assertive Dalit voices. This period marked a shift from localized struggles to a broader digital and pan-Indian movement for dignity and equality. A pivotal moment came in 2011, when Dalit intellectuals and activists began using platforms like Twitter and Facebook to bypass mainstream media and directly challenge casteist narratives. Meena Kandasamy, a poet and activist, became a central figure through her outspoken writing and digital engagement. Her work exemplified a fusion of political journalism, literature, and personal testimony, which many scholars view as emblematic of the Dalit Spring's voice. This period also saw Dalit-focused content appear in prominent outlets like Outlook India, The Hindu, and India Today, giving unprecedented visibility to caste issues. The movement reached new heights following the 2016 institutional murder of Rohith Vemula, a Dalit PhD student at the University of Hyderabad. His suicide letter became a rallying cry for Dalit youth and student groups across the country. Protests erupted on campuses nationwide, demanding justice and exposing caste discrimination in higher education. This event is often considered the George Floyd moment for India's caste struggle, further solidifying the metaphor of a "Dalit Spring" as a broad-based civil rights awakening. The CP (Communist Part of India) called for the punishment of BJP leaders and University Authorities who they held responsible for suicide of Vemula. Another defining aspect of the Dalit Spring has been its intersectionality—embracing gender, racial, sexuality, and economic justice as integral to anti-caste activism. Dalit women in particular have played prominent roles, challenging both caste and patriarchal norms within activist spaces. Writers, artists, and performers have used digital media to critique dominant narratives and assert their voices in public discourse. These actions have broadened the movement beyond traditional political spaces into the cultural and symbolic domains. While some scholars question the long-term impact of the movement, others argue that the Dalit Spring has transformed the terms of debate about caste in India. It has shifted the focus from victimhood to assertion, from silence to speech, and from margins to visibility.
