= Adusumilli Srikrishna =

Indian chemist and professor (1955–2013)

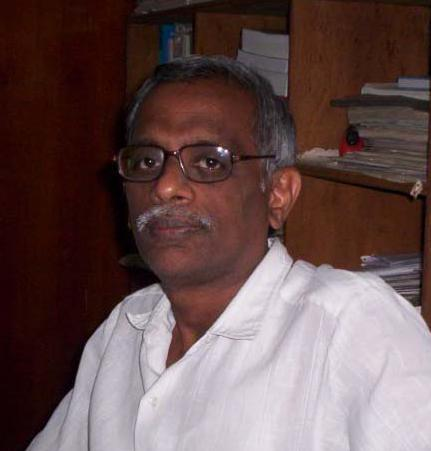
- Born: 1 January 1955; Gudivada, Krishna district, Andhra Pradesh, India
- Died: 20 January 2013 (aged 58)
- Education: Nagarjuna University; Andhra University; University of Hyderabad; University of Chicago; Columbia University
- Known for: Studies on radical cyclisation and natural products synthesis
- Awards: 1987 INSA Young Scientist Medal; 1993 Dr. S. Husain Zaheer Young Scientist Award; 1994 B. M. Birla Science Award; 1996 ICS Professor R. D. Desai 80th Birthday Commemoration Award; 1997 Shanti Swarup Bhatnagar Prize
- Scientific career
- Fields: Organic chemistry
- Workplaces: Indian Institute of Science
- Doctoral advisor: Goverdhan Mehta; Philip Eaton; Gilbert Stork
- Doctoral students: Dhevalapally B. Ramachary

Adusumilli Srikrishna (1955–2013) was an Indian organic chemist and a professor at the department of organic chemistry at the Indian Institute of Science. He was known for his researches on radical cyclisation and natural products synthesis. He was an elected fellow of the Indian National Science Academy, National Academy of Sciences, India and the Indian Academy of Sciences. The Council of Scientific and Industrial Research, the apex agency of the Government of India for scientific research, awarded him the Shanti Swarup Bhatnagar Prize for Science and Technology, one of the highest Indian science awards, in 1997, for his contributions to chemical sciences.

== Biography ==
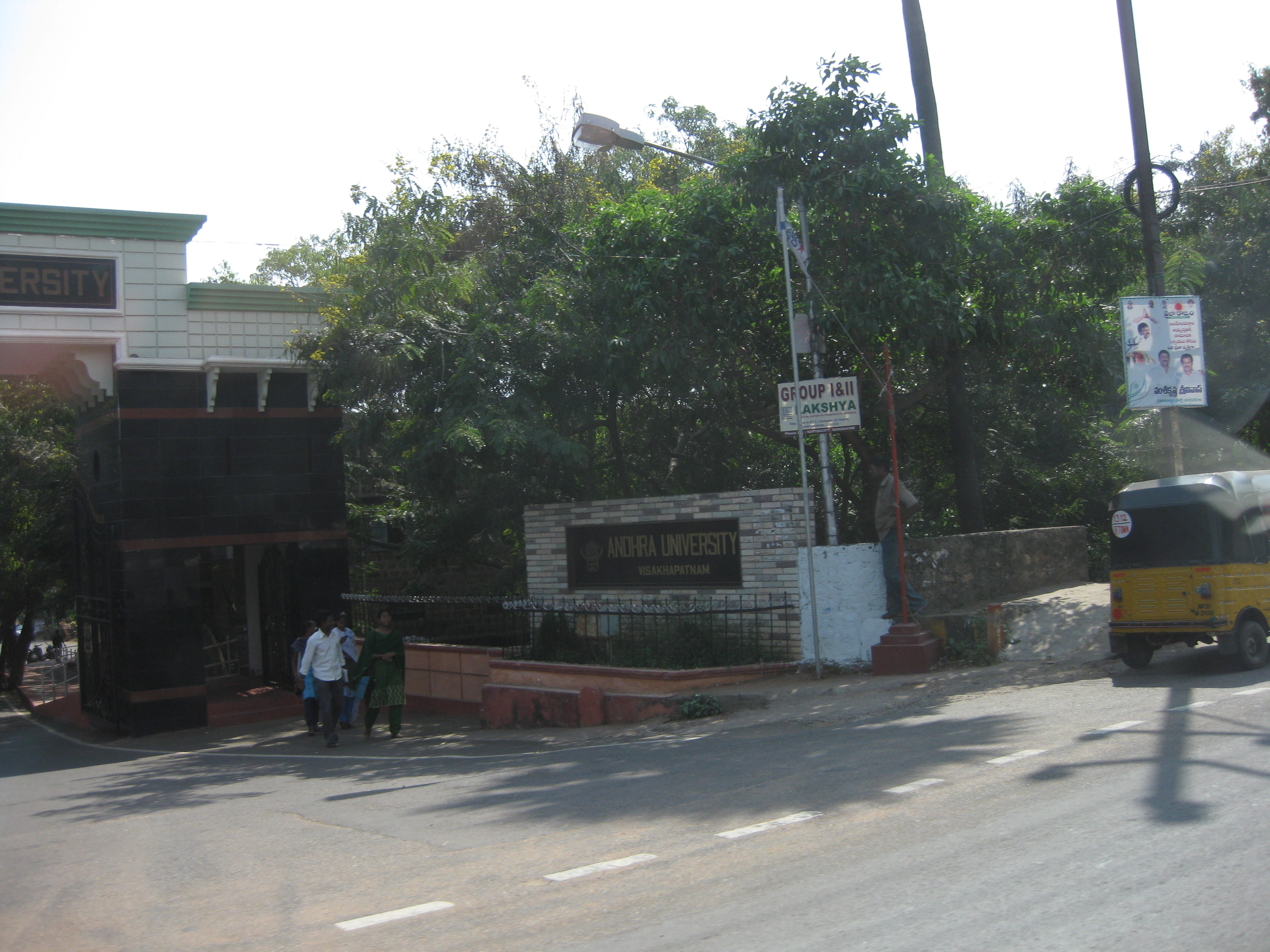
Andhra University

A. Srikrishna was born on the New Year's Day of 1955, in Gudivada, a small town in Krishna district of the south Indian state of Andhra Pradesh. He did his graduate studies at the ANR College of Nagarjuna University in 1973 and completed a master's degree from Andhra University in 1975. Enrolling at the University of Hyderabad under the guidance of Goverdhan Mehta, a Padma Shri recipient and Shanti Swarup Bhatnagar laureate, he secured an MPhil in synthetic organic chemistry in 1976 and a PhD in 1981 for his thesis, Triquinanes – synthesis and transformations, thus becoming the first PhD awardee of the university. Moving to the US in 1982, he stayed there to complete his post-doctoral studies at the laboratory of Philip Eaton at University of Chicago and later with Gilbert Stork at Columbia University. He returned to India in 1985 to join the Indian Institute of Science as a teaching faculty at the department of organic chemistry where he spent the rest of his career. He died on 20 January 2013, at the age of 58, while serving as a professor. During his tenure at the IISc, he held various positions such as that of an assistant professor (from 1989), associate professor (from 1994), professor (from 1999) and as the chair of the department (2003–05).

== Legacy ==
Srikrishna focused his research on organic synthesis and his studies have widened the understanding of the synthesis of natural products especially radical cyclisation and annulation based strategies. His contributions are reported in the racemic and enantiomeric synthesis of natural products and development of new reagents used in selective organic transformations. His research has been published in several peer-reviewed articles; ResearchGate, an online article repository has listed 379 of them. He sat on the editorial boards of the Proceedings of the Indian National Science Academy during 2002–05 and the Indian Journal of Chemistry, Section B in 2002 and guided 23 doctoral scholars in their studies.

== Awards and honors ==
Srikrishna received the Young Scientist Medal of the Indian National Science Academy in 1987 and the Dr. S. Husain Zaheer Young Scientist Award of Zaheer Science Foundation in 1993. The B. M. Birla Science Award for Chemistry was awarded to him in 1994 and the Indian Chemical Society awarded him the Professor R. D. Desai 80th Birthday Commemoration Award in 1996. The Council of Scientific and Industrial Research awarded him the Shanti Swarup Bhatnagar Prize, one of the highest Indian science awards, in 1997. He was an elected fellow of all the three major Indian science academies, viz. the National Academy of Sciences, India, Indian Academy of Sciences and the Indian National Science Academy (2002). A. B. Kulkarni Endowment Lecture of Bombay University (1998), Professor S. Swaminathan Endowment Award of the University of Madras (2002–03), Acharya J. C. Ghosh Memorial Lecture of the Indian Chemical Society (2008) are some of the notable award orations delivered by Srikrishna.

== See also ==
- Goverdhan Mehta
- Philip Eaton
- Gilbert Stork
