= Malladi Subbamma =

Indian feminist writer and humanist (1924–2014)

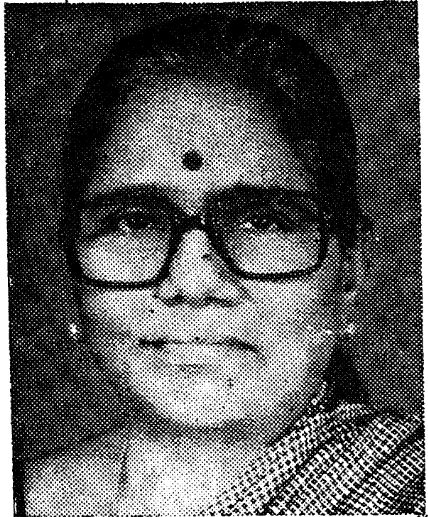
Malladi Subbamma

Malladi Subbamma (2 August 1924 – 15 May 2014) born in Pothardhakam in Repella of Guntur district. She was a feminist writer, rationalist, and editor of Stree Swetcha (transl. Women's Will). She worked for the upliftment of women by focusing on their education. She became a prominent figure in united Andhra Pradesh, after spearheading the Anti-liquor movement. The movement became a huge success and a prohibition on the sale of alcohol in the state was implemented in 1994. As the head of the Institute of Advancement of Women, she conducted many study camps to educate women. She was an avid proponent of humanism, for that she traveled throughout the country to propagate the same. In 2012, she sold her belongings and donated the proceeds to the building dedicated for Center for Women's Studies at University of Hyderabad on International Women's Day. She has authored about 110 books and 500 articles, mainly on Women's empowerment other women's issues.

== Literary works ==
Among many books and articles she has authored, the following are some of her prominent works:

- Bānisā kādu dēvatā kādu in Telugu
- Ō mahiḷā! munduku sāgipō in Telugu
- Samasyalu, saṃskaraṇalu in Telugu
- Mahiḷā abhyudayamu in Telugu
- Taratarāla strīla parājaya gādha in Telugu
- Āndhrapradēślō mahiḷōdyamaṃ, mahiḷā saṅghālu, 1860-1983 in Telugu
- Pātivratyaṃ nuṇḍi pheminijaṃ dākā : ātmakadha in Telugu
- Women and Social Reform
- Women, Tradition and Culture
- The Visnumahapuranam
- Status of Indian Women
- Manava Hakkulu-Mahilala Hakkulu in Telugu
- Women in Changing Society
