= D. Srinivasa Reddy =

Indian organic and medical chemist

- Born: 10 April 1971 (age 55); Andhra Pradesh, India
- Education: Osmania University; University of Hyderabad; Indian Institute of Science; University of Chicago; University of Kansas
- Known for: Silicon-switch approach
- Awards: 2013 Central Drug Research Institute Research Excellence Award; 2015 CRSI Bronze Medal; 2015 NASI-Reliance Industries Platinum Jubilee Award; 2015 Shanti Swarup Bhatnagar Prize
- Scientific career
- Fields: Organic chemistry; Medicinal chemistry
- Workplaces: Dr. Reddy's Laboratories; Advinus Therapeutics; National Chemical Laboratory; CSIR-CDRI; CDRI-IIIM; CSIR-IICT
- Doctoral advisor: Goverdhan Mehta; Sergey A. Kozmin; Jeffrey Aubé

Dumbala Srinivasa Reddy (born 1971) is currently Director CSIR-IICT Indian Institute of Chemical Technology Hyderabad India (June 2022), he has additional charge of CSIR-IIIM CSIR-Institute of Integrative Medicine at Jammu and CSIR-CDRI CSIR-Drug Research Institute at Lucknow, India.

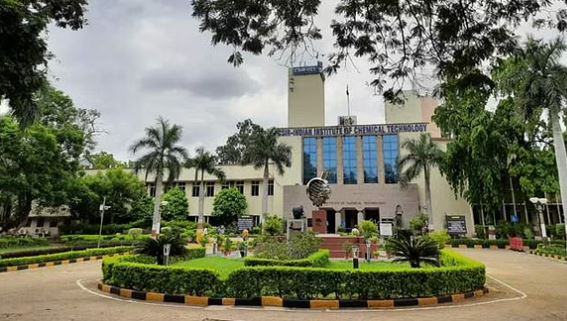
CSIR-IICT Hyderabad India

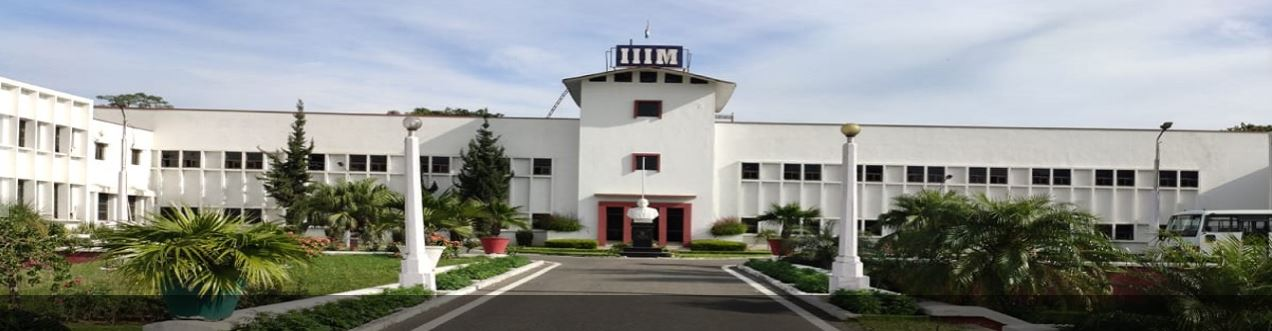
CSIR-IIIM Jammu India

He is Indian organic and medicinal chemist and was a senior scientist at National Chemical Laboratory. He is known for the application of Silicon-switch approach, a management protocol for treating diseases affecting the central nervous system in his researches and is a recipient of the Bronze Medal of the Chemical Research Society of India, NASI-Reliance Industries Platinum Jubilee Award and the Drug Research Excellence Award of the Central Drug Research Institute. The Council of Scientific and Industrial Research, the apex agency of the Government of India for scientific research, awarded him the Shanti Swarup Bhatnagar Prize for Science and Technology, one of the highest Indian science awards, in 2015, for his contributions to chemical sciences.

== Biography ==
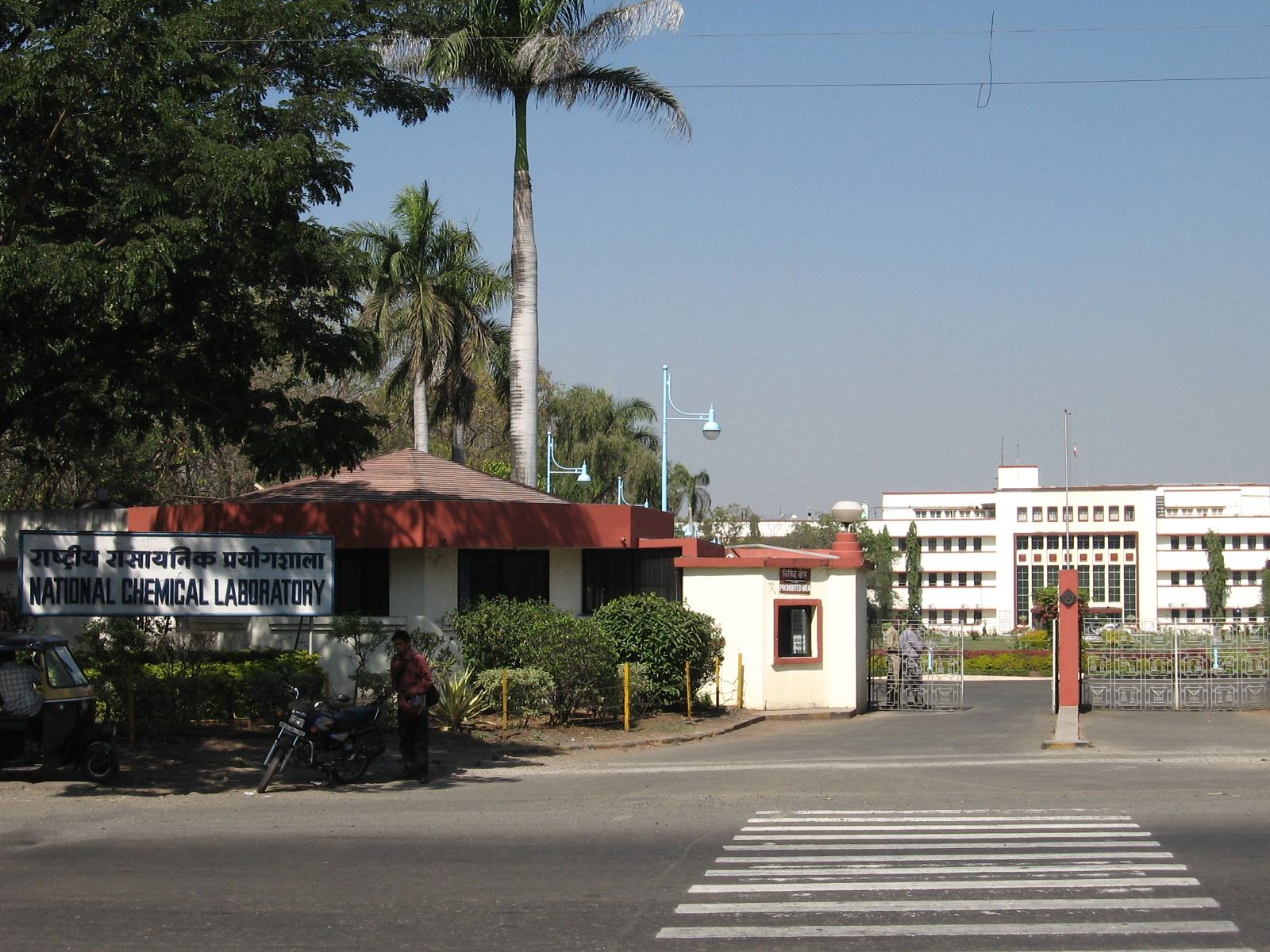
National Chemical Laboratory

He did BSC from SP College Secunderabad, D. Srinivasa Reddy graduated in chemistry in 1991 from Osmania University and completed his master's degree from the same institution Nizams college in 1993.

He joined IICT as project assistant, cleared CSIR-NET and enrolled for doctorate, under the guidance of Goverdhan Mehta, a noted chemist and former vice chancellor of University of Hyderabad, he moved to Indian Institute of Science when Mehta took up the position as the head of the department of organic chemistry at IISc.

His PhD came from Hyderabad University in 2000, During this period, he met Vidya Ramadas who was also pursuing her PhD in the same research group and later married her. Dr Reddy proceeded to the US where he did his post-doctoral work at the laboratories of Sergey A. Kozmin of the University of Chicago and Jeffrey Aubé of University of Kansas during 2001–03.

He started his career in 2003 as a principal scientist at Dr. Reddy’s Laboratories and became a research investigator in 2006 but a year later, he moved to Advinus Therapeutics as the group leader of their Discovery Chemistry research wing. In 2010, he was promoted as the section head; soon after, he left for National Chemical Laboratory where he worked as a senior scientist. He is currently Director CSIR-IICT Hyderabad India [], he has additional charge of CSIR-IIIM at Jammu and CSIR-CDRI at Lucknow, India. He is currently 10th director at IICT.

== Selected patents ==
1. Enantiospecific synthesis of pheromones, D. Srinivasa Reddy, Remya Ramesh, WO2016181413A4; US10221122B2.

2. Process for the synthesis of ivacaftor and related compounds, D. Srinivasa Reddy, N. Vasudevan, GorakhJachak, WO2016181414A1; US20180127373A1.

3. Tricyclic compounds and process for preparation thereof, D. Srinivasa Reddy, Kishor L. Handore, WO2016013032A1; US9950983B2.

4. Synthesis of tricyclic compounds and uses thereof, D. Srinivasa Reddy, K. Kashinath, PrakashJadhav, WO2015121876A1.

5. Novel N-heterocyclic carbene compounds, their preparation and use, D. Srinivasa Reddy, Revannath L. Sutar, Vinod Kumar, Rahul D. Shingare, WO2015102020A1.

6. Silicon based fungicides and process for producing the same, D. Srinivasa Reddy, GorakhJachak, Remya Ramesh, SantoshTupe, MukundDeshpande, US10053472B2, WO2015102025A1; EP3089985B1.

7. Novel indazole compounds and a process for the preparation thereof, D. Srinivasa Reddy, Chaitanya Saxena, K. Kashinath, WO2015015519A1; US9737510B2; DK3027605T3; EP3027605B1; JP6474808B2; KR20160053916A; CN106103427A; CA2919953A1; DK3027605T3; ES2656475T3.

8. Novel pyrrole compounds with silicon incorporation, D. Srinivasa Reddy, Vasudevan Natarajan, Sachin B. Wagh, Remya Ramesh, US9657037B2; WO2014195970A4.

9. Novel pyrazole compounds with silicon incorporation, D. Srinivasa Reddy, Remya Ramesh, Rahul D. Shingare, WO2014181357A1.

10. Insect repellents, D. Srinivasa Reddy, Kishor L. Handore, B. Seetharam Singh, AvalokiteswarSen, PushpaPawar, Mary Joseph, WO2014170915A1.

11. Anticancer compounds and process for the preparation thereof, D. Srinivasa Reddy, Kishor L. Handore, US9845302B2; WO2014128723A3.

12. Antitubercular compounds and process for the preparation thereof, D. Srinivasa Reddy, Remya Ramesh, WO2014128724A1.

13. Enantioselective process for the preparation of enantiomers of sex pheromones, D. Srinivasa Reddy, US9598346B2; WO2014115172A1.

14. A process for the preparation of aminoacrylic acid derivatives, D. Srinivasa Reddy, K. Kashinath, P. Siva Swaroop, US9193674B2; WO2013054366A8; EP2766340B1.

15. Sila analogs of oxazolidinone derivatives and synthesis thereof D. Srinivasa Reddy, B. Seetharam Singh, Remya Ramesh, WO2013054275A1; EP2766373B1; JP6162704B2; US9233989B2.

16. Glycoside derivatives and uses thereof, B. G. Raymond, Bock Mark G, D. Srinivasa Reddy, Hajare Atul K, Vyavahare Vinod, Bhosale Sandeep B, Kurhade Suresh E, Salunkhe Videsh, Shaikh Nadim S, Bhuniya Debnath, Palle P. Venkata, FengLili, LiangJessica, US8163704B2/US9895389B2; EP2491029B1; JP5384744B2; KR101465308B1; CN102656165B; CA2777812C;DK2491029T3; ES2564191T3; WO2011048112A1; TWI594765B

17. Glycoside derivative and uses thereof, B. G. Raymond, Bock Mark G, Bhuniya Debnath, Datrange Laxmikant, Kurhade Suresh E, Palle P. Venkata, D. SrinivasaReddy EP2491050; CA2778384A1; US8394772B2; KR20120087950A; CN102510867A; WO2011048148A3.

18. Glucoside derivatives and uses thereof as sglt inhibitors, Palle P. Venkata, Bhuniya Debnath, D.SrinivasaReddy, KurhadeSureshE, US20110269700A1; JP2012502953A; KR20110060935A; CA2737831A1; CN102159206A; WO2010031820A1; AU2009294613A1

19. Glycoside derivatives and uses thereof, Palle P. Venkata, D. Srinivasa Reddy, Kurhade SureshE, Bhuniya Debnath, US20110230403A1; WO2010031813A1; JP2012502950A; KR20110055740A; CN102159561A;CA2737830A1

20. Fused heterocyclic C-glycosides for the treatment of diabetes, B. G. Raymond, Bhosale Sandeep B, Bhuniya Debnath, Hajare Atul K, Mengawade Tanaji, Mukhopadhyay P, Palle P. Venkata, D. Srinivasa Reddy, WO2010128152A1

21. Novel heterocyclic compounds as lasy activators D. Srinivasa Reddy, Padmalayam Indira, Bhuniya Debnath, Pillarisetti Sivaram, Chakrabarti Ranjan, WO2008036967A3 22. Methods and compositions for the treatment of inflammation, obesity and related metabolic disorders, Padmalayam Indira, Bhuniya Debnath, D. Srinivasa Reddy, Khanna Ish, Saxena Uday, Pillarisetti Sivaram, WO2008036966A3.

== Research ==
Reddy's research have been focused on total organic synthesis of molecules with a view to their applications in agricultural and medicinal uses. He is credited with the total synthesis of over 20 agro-chemicals which includes a mealy bug-attracting sex pheromone that has reported use in crop protection. He has also developed several other products that has potential uses as cell-adhesion inhibitors, antibacterial, anti-inflammatory as well as anti-cancer agents and as insect repellents.

He employs the Silicon-switch approach for developing drug strategies for diseases affecting the central nervous system and his work has assisted in the drug discovery for the treatment of some infectious diseases as well as diabetes. His researches have been documented by way of a number of peer-reviewed articles; Google Scholar, an online article repository of scientific articles, has listed 123 of them respectively. He has also applied for 30 patents based on his researches.

== Awards and honours ==
Reddy received the Award for Excellence in Drug Research of the Central Drug Research Institute in 2013 and the Scientist of the Year Award of the National Chemical Laboratory the same year. He received three awards in 2015, starting with the NASI-Reliance Industries Platinum Jubilee Award, followed by the Bronze Medal of the Chemical Research Society of India. The Council of Scientific and Industrial Research awarded him the Shanti Swarup Bhatnagar Prize, one of the highest Indian science awards, also in 2015.

== See also ==
- Goverdhan Mehta
