= Rentala Madhubala =

Indian scientist

- Education: Jawaharlal Nehru University; University of Hyderabad
- Scientific career
- Workplaces: Jawaharlal Nehru University

Rentala Madhubala is an Indian scientist who studied molecular parasitology and functional genomics. She is the director of the Academic Staff College in Jawaharlal Nehru University. She was the Dean at the School of Life Sciences and the director of the Advanced Instrumentation Research Facility there.

== Education and career ==
Madhubala received her bachelor's and master's degrees in zoology from the Delhi University. She completed her M.Phil. in life sciences at Jawaharlal Nehru University in 1974 and obtained a PhD in biochemistry from the University of Hyderabad in 1983. She is a fellow of Indian Academy of Sciences, National Academy of Sciences, India and Indian National Science Academy.
