= Theatre Outreach Unit =

Theatre Outreach Unit (TOU) was set up by the Dept. of Theatre Arts, University of Hyderabad, India. Its aim is to engage with theatre practice outside institutional parameters in such a way that there is a continuous flow of skills and knowledge in the field of theatre between academic study and practice in the field. With the support of Sir Ratan Tata Trust TOU has taken up a project "Enhancement of livelihoods through revitalizing of Parishat theatre in Andhra Pradesh".

== Team ==
- Dr. Peddi Ramarao as Project Co-ordinator
- SM Basha as Project Administrator
- Shaik John Basheer as Project Associate
- Pranayraj Vangari as Project Assistant

== Perspective Building Meetings ==
There are 52 Parishats in Andhra Pradesh, conducting theatre competitions every year and creating space for around 80 theatre groups spread across the state. In order to work with them, three Perspective Building Meetings are planned covering the three major regions, namely Coastal Andhra, Rayalaseema and Telangana. Each meeting would be for one day duration having an open interaction with the local theatre artists, directors and Parishat organisers. The objective of these three meetings is to bridge the gap between academics and practice of theatre. The Dept. would able to understand the aspirations of Parishat organisers, theatre groups through these meetings. These meetings will also provide a platform for the Dept. to offer them their collaboration with the Parishat community.

== Identifying the target groups and artists ==
After the Perspective Building meetings, the Dept. would pick up the artists, theatre groups who are going to be a part of the collaboration for the next 18 months work. The selection of the groups and individuals would be done through a meticulous discussion with the staff and invited field experts at the Dept.

== Short Term Theatre Training Programmes ==
The lack of proper knowledge and skill are the primary reasons for the decline in the quality of Parishat Natakam. In order to overcome this, a series of four workshops are planned in the fields of 1) lighting 2) Set Design 3) Make up & Costumes 4) Music / Use of Technology. These workshops are intended to equip the theatre groups, artists of Parishats with the latest methods/ skills of executing a theatre performance. Through these workshops, diversity in themes and quality of the productions would be achieved. During the first phase, four short term theatre training programmes would be organised for the selected artists and technicians. A bunch of 20 artists representing 20 different Theatre Groups will be trained on full-time basis. The training will be on several aspects of theatre arts, covering acting, speech, costumes, make up, set design etc.

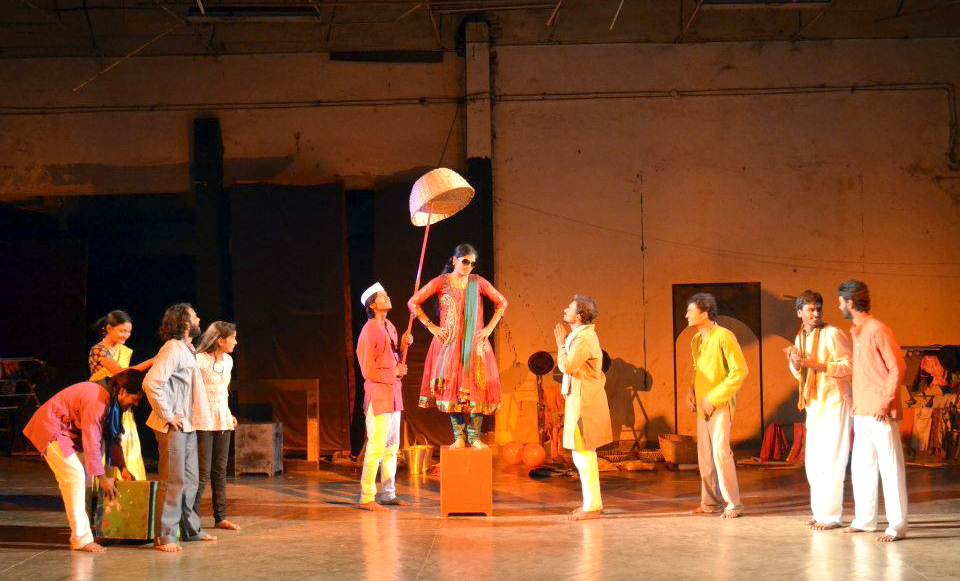
Miss Meena (Telugu)

== Artists in Residency Programme ==
A group of 12 young artists will be selected from a vigorous screening process and they will be given a fellowship of s.15,000/ per month per a period of eight months. During the first three months, these artists will stay in our campus as guestsand go through an intensive training in Theatre which involves a play production also. In the remaining five months, the group will start their touring all over Andhra Pradesh, giving performances in Parishats, colleges and schools. Miss Meena a play in Telugu was successfully produced and performed by one of the batches from the Artists in Residency Programme of TOU.

== Creating New Audience ==
When once look at the audience of the Parishat theatre in Andhra Pradesh, it can be observed that they are fixed audience between the age groups of 45 to 75. Since majority of the population being the youth in India, it can be understood that without receiving the patronage from the youth, theatre will not survive. Hence, a special focus should be given in driving the new audience to the Parishat theatre by way of creating new spaces and new plays. The other problem with Parishat theatre is they are very region specific. In order to cater to the Telugu audience of other cities out of A.P, a strategic intervention would be initiated to identify such places and arranging performances. Performances at Bharatiya Rang Mahostav (New Delhi), Prithvi theatre (Mumbai), Rangasankara(Bangolore) etc. would enhance the status of Parishat Theatre and also create new audience.

== Strengthening Theatre Spaces ==
The lack of proper theatre spaces all over Andhra Pradesh is considered as one of the major reasons for the lack of regular practice of theatre. Though Hyderabad being the capital city, it does not have a proper theatre space where theatre artists, groups, audience can gather and watch a performance on regular basis. In order to overcome this, TOU has proposes to remodel its Golden Threshold premises and dedicate it to the theatre practice. With this, people of Hyderabad will also have a proper cultural hub as in the case of other metro cities. The activities under strengthening the Theatre Spaces include… A) Remodelling the existing Golden Threshold B) Generating the equipment, power backups etc. C) Inauguration of Golden Threshold as Cultural Hub D) Announcing the calendar of events, plays that are going to be performed in G.T E) Launching of website of TOU with special emphasis on G.T Apart from dedicating and developing G.T as cultural hub, TOU would initiate the consultancy for developing and equipping performing spaces in other towns and villages.

== Sustainable Livelihood through Theatre ==
Theatre practice in Andhra Pradesh has become seasonal. Hence the livelihoods of the artists are also at serious stake during the non- season. In order to make them full time workers of theatre, the other avenues needed to be identified.

== Training in Children’s Theatre / Applied Theatre ==
The training in Children’s Theatre/ Applied theatre would further develop the avenues for the theatre groups and result the growth of their income. This advanced training will give them confidence to explore the opportunities at the local schools. They will understand the usage of their skills in producing plays for various Govt and non Govt. agencies working in the fields of health and development.

== Training in Marketing, Fund rising & Publicity ==
A special training focusing on various crucial issues in marketing and publicising the theatre performances will be organised for the selected theatre groups. Though, the Govt is the largest patron of arts and culture, it requires certain kind of documentation and procedure to seek the grants. Hence it is taken as one of the primary objectives of the TOU to get the registrations done for all the theatre groups and instruct them the process of auditing, maintaining the accounts and applying for the grants whenever the announcement comes up.
