= Radhika Vemula =

Indian activist

- Born: Andhra Pradesh, India
- Occupation: Activist
- Children: Rohith, Raja, and Nileema

Radhika Vemula is an Indian activist for Dalit rights and against caste based discrimination.

She continues the work started by her son, Rohith Vemula (leader of Ambedkar Students' Association), who committed suicide in the University of Hyderabad in 2016 - an incident which sparked outrage across India and gained widespread media attention as a case of Dalit discrimination in Indian universities. During the protest at the University of Hyderabad, police had arrested Radhika Vemula and other students on the first death anniversary of her son. She is seeking to end caste discrimination in universities and other higher education institutions.

However, the District Level Scrutiny Committee in Guntur district of Andhra Pradesh, which was reviewing the Dalit status of Rohith Vemula, submitted its final report to the government stating that neither Rohith nor his mother Radhika were Dalits. It has been claimed that she was born a Mala (Dalit), but was adapted by a lady Anjali Devi who was Vaddera (OBC). Anjali spoke fluent English, although Radhika did not know any English.

== Family ==
Radhika Vemula mothered three children, her older son Rohith(30/01/1989 to 17/01/2016), a younger son Raja, and her daughter Nileema.

== Conversion to Buddhism ==
On 14 April 2016, on the 125th Ambedkar Jayanti, Radhika Vemula, and her son Raja converted to Buddhism in Mumbai, Maharashtra. Prakash Ambedkar, grandson of Babasaheb Ambedkar, initiated the conversion of Rohith's family to Buddhism at Dr. Babasaheb Ambedkar Bhavan in Dadar, Mumbai.
