= Mohammed Baig Ehsas =

Urdu writer (born 1948)

- Born: 10 August 1948 (age 78); Hyderabad, Hyderabad State (now in Telangana, India)
- Education: University of Hyderabad (PhD)
- Writing career
- Notable awards: Sahitya Akademi Award

Mohammed Baig Ehsas (Urdu: بیگ احساس; born 10 August 1948 in Hyderabad) was an Indian scholar and short story writer from Hyderabad. He served as the head of the Urdu department at Osmania University and University of Hyderabad. His short story collection Dukhma won the 2017 Sahitya Akademi Award for Urdu. He died on 8 September 2021 at the age of 73 in Asian Institute of Gastroenterology Hospital Hyderabad Telangana.

His works have been translated into English.

== Academic career ==
Ehsas enrolled as a PhD student at the University of Hyderabad in 1979, as part of the first batch of scholars at the newly formed Department of Urdu. His thesis on the life and work of Krishan Chander was completed in 1984. Following this, he accepted the position of Lecturer at Osmania University. He was the head of Department of Urdu Studies for two terms at Osmania between 2000–2002 and 2004–2006. He later served as head of the Urdu department at University of Hyderabad before retiring in 2013.

== Literary career ==
Ehsas is a short-story writer whose work is mainly concerned with chronicling the life of his native Hyderabad and its composite multilingual, multi-religious culture. He has written three short-story collections – Khusha-e-gandum, Hanzal, and Dukhma. The last work, centered around the lives of people living near a Parsi cemetery in Secunderabad, won the 2017 Sahitya Akademi Award for Urdu.

Ehsas has also published a collection of literary essays titled Shor-e-jahan.
