= Ganesh Bagler =

Indian biologist (born 1977)

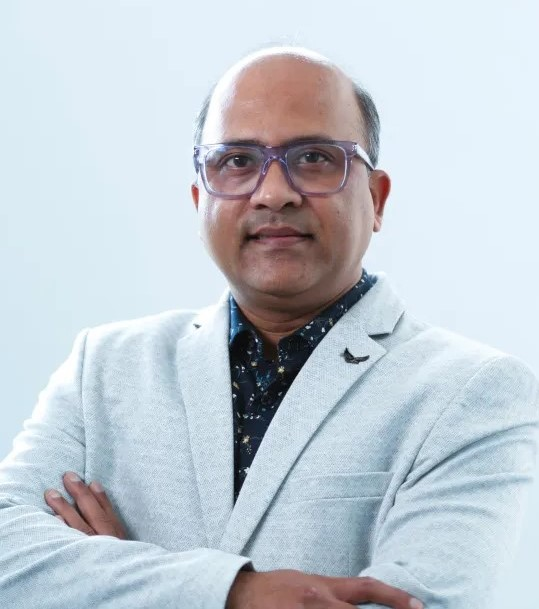
- Born: 1977 (age 48–49); Solapur, Maharashtra, India
- Education: Savitribai Phule Pune University; University of Hyderabad; Centre for Cellular and Molecular Biology; National Centre for Biological Sciences; Max Planck Institute for Molecular Genetics
- Scientific career
- Fields: Computational Biology
- Workplaces: Institute of Himalayan Bioresource Technology; Indian Institute of Technology Jodhpur; Dhirubhai Ambani Institute of Information and Communication Technology; Indraprastha Institute of Information Technology, Delhi
- Website: cosylab.iiitd.edu.in

Ganesh Bagler is an Indian scientist known for his work in computational gastronomy, an interdisciplinary field that applies data science and complex systems to culinary practices and food systems. His research spans global cuisines, and explores phenomena such as food pairing, flavor networks, and the cultural and health aspects of food. As of 2025, he was a professor at the Indraprastha Institute of Information Technology, Delhi.

== Early life and education ==
Ganesh Bagler was born and raised in Solapur, Maharashtra, where he completed his schooling at Sharada School and Siddheshwar High School, Solapur in the western peninsular Indian state of Maharashtra.

He pursued a Bachelor of Science (B.Sc.) degree in Physics from Sangameshwar College, affiliated with Shivaji University, graduating in 1997. Bagler continued his academic journey at the University of Hyderabad, earning a Master of Technology (M.Tech.) in Computational Techniques. He later joined the Centre for Cellular and Molecular Biology (CCMB) for his doctoral studies, where his Ph.D. research focused on the application of graph theoretical models to protein structures.

== Career ==
After earning his Ph.D. from the Centre for Cellular and Molecular Biology, where he focused on graph theoretical models of protein structures, Bagler completed postdoctoral research in computational neuroscience at the National Centre for Biological Sciences. He then worked at the Max Planck Institute for Molecular Genetics in Prof. Michael Lappe's (Otto Warburg Laboratory, Bioinformatics/Structural Proteomics) group in Germany on bioinformatics and structural proteomics. Returning to India, Bagler joined the CSIR-Institute of Himalayan Bioresource Technology as a scientist before moving to the Indian Institute of Technology Jodhpur as an assistant professor and later the Dhirubhai Ambani Institute of Information and Communication Technology.

In March 2015, Bagler was removed from the position of assistant professor at the Indian Institute of Technology Jodhpur. Students protested the termination. Bagler moved to Indraprastha Institute of Information Technology and became a professor there.

== Research ==
Bagler's research focuses on identifying the molecules in food ingredients responsible for creating flavour and investigating how this information can be used to understand how various combinations taste and behave in the body without trial and error, which can be time consuming and wasteful.

== Most cited works ==
- Ganesh Bagler (2008). "Analysis of Airport Network of India as a complex weighted network". Physica A. 387 (12): 2972–2980. arXiv:cond-mat/0409773. Bibcode:2008PhyA..387.2972B. doi:10.1016/j.physa.2008.01.077. S2CID 119387720.
- Neelansh Garg; Apurup Sethupathy; Rudraksh Tuwani; Rakhi NK; Shubham Dokania; Arvind Iyer; Ayushi Gupta; Shubhra Agrawal; Navjot Singh; Shubham Shukla; Kriti Kathuria; Rahul Badhwar; Rakesh Kanji; Anupam Jain; Avneet Kaur; Rashmi Nagpal; Ganesh Bagler (2018). "FlavorDB: A database of flavor molecules". Nucleic Acids Research. D1 (D1): D1210–D1216. doi:10.1093/nar/gkx957. PMC 5753196. PMID 29059383.
