= Computational gastronomy =

Computer analysis of aspects of food

Computational gastronomy is an interdisciplinary field combining computational science with culinary studies. It applies data-driven techniques to analyze various aspects of food, including recipes, flavors, nutrition, and sustainability. The field utilizes advancements in data analytics, machine learning, and computational models to systematically study food and optimize culinary practices. Applications of computational gastronomy include recipe optimization, flavor profiling, nutritional analysis, and personalized dietary recommendations.

== Overview ==
The field of computational gastronomy aims to enhance understanding and innovation in culinary science through computational tools. By analyzing the relationships between food components, health, and flavor, researchers seek to create innovative culinary experiences and improve food preparation techniques. Despite its potential, the field faces challenges such as the lack of high-quality, well-structured datasets, particularly for traditional recipes, and the inherent subjectivity of sensory experiences like taste.

== Techniques and Applications ==
=== Recipe Optimization ===
Computational methods are employed to analyze and optimize recipes by identifying patterns in ingredient ratios, cooking times, and temperature controls. These analyses lead to more efficient cooking processes and the creation of flavorful and nutritious dishes.

=== Flavor Profiling and Pairing ===
By studying the chemical composition of food, computational gastronomy enables the prediction of flavor profiles and suitable pairings. This knowledge is applied to enhance dining experiences through scientifically informed menu design.

=== Nutritional Optimization ===
The field contributes to the optimization of nutritional content in meals while balancing taste, texture, and cost. Computational models analyze ingredient data to create healthier dishes, accommodating specific dietary requirements such as low-calorie, low-fat, or gluten-free diets.

=== Novel Recipe Generation ===
Using natural language processing (NLP) and machine learning models, computational gastronomy facilitates the generation of unique recipes. Models such as Long Short-Term Memory (LSTM) networks and GPT-2 have been trained on extensive recipe datasets to synthesize ingredient lists and cooking instructions, supporting culinary creativity and personalized cooking experiences.

=== Personalized Nutrition ===
The field integrates physiological and genetic data to develop tailored dietary plans. Personalized nutrition aims to manage chronic diseases, enhance athletic performance, and improve overall health through customized meal recommendations.

=== Traditional Cuisine Analysis ===
By analyzing traditional recipes and culinary techniques, computational gastronomy explores the cultural and historical significance of food. Insights from such analyses can inform health and flavor optimization strategies and influence future culinary innovations.

== Challenges and Future Directions ==
Computational gastronomy faces challenges related to data quality, cultural diversity in recipes, and the subjective nature of taste. Researchers emphasize collaboration among chefs, scientists, and technologists to address these issues.

== Notable researchers ==
- Ganesh Bagler
