= G. Naresh Patwari =

Indian chemist

- Born: 13 December 1972 (age 53); Bodhan Mandal, Nizamabad, Telangana, India
- Education: Osmania University; University of Hyderabad; Tata Institute of Fundamental Research; Tohoku University; University of Illinois at Urbana-Champaign
- Known for: Studies on molecular clusters
- Awards: 2017 Shanti Swarup Bhatnagar Prize
- Scientific career
- Fields: Spectroscopy
- Workplaces: IIT Bombay

Ganpathi Naresh Patwari (born 13 December 1972) is an Indian chemist and a professor at the Department of Chemistry of the Indian Institute of Technology Bombay. Known for his studies on vibrational spectroscopy, his work is reported to have widened the understanding of the fundamental concepts in hydrogen bonding.

== Biography ==
Born on 13 December 1972 at Bodhan Mandal, Nizamabad district in the south Indian state of undivided Andhra Pradesh (presently in Telangana), Naresh Patwari did his early schooling at his home village. His undergraduate studies were at Osmania University and after earning a BSc in 1992, he moved to the University of Hyderabad to complete his master's degree (MSc) in 1994. Subsequently, he enrolled for doctoral research at Tata Institute of Fundamental Research to secure PhD in 2000 after which he did post-doctoral work at Tohoku University during 2000–02 on a fellowship awarded by Japan Society for the Promotion of Science and completed his post-doctoral work at University of Illinois at Urbana-Champaign in 2003. Returning to India, he joined the Indian Institute of Technology, Bombay in April 2003 as an assistant professor, became an associate professor in 2007 and holds the position of a professor since 2012.

Patwari's studies have been documented by way of a number of articles (Note: Please see Selected bibliography section) and ResearchGate, an online article repository of scientific articles, has listed several of them. He has also delivered invited talks at many seminars and conferees. The Council of Scientific and Industrial Research, the apex agency of the Government of India for scientific research, awarded him the Shanti Swarup Bhatnagar Prize for Science and Technology, one of the highest Indian science awards, for his contributions to chemical sciences in 2017. (Note: Long link - please select award year to see details)

== Awards ==
- 2018 Asian Scientist 100, Asian Scientist

== Selected bibliography ==
- G. Naresh Patwari, Asuka Fujii, Naohiko Mikami (2006). "Complete infrared spectroscopic characterization of phenol-borane-trimethylamine dihydrogen-bonded complex in the gas phase". The Journal of Chemical Physics. 124 (24): 241103. Bibcode:2006JChPh.124x1103P. doi:10.1063/1.2212937. PMID 16821963.
- Surajit Maity, G. Naresh Patwari (2009). "Hydrogen Bonding to Multifunctional Molecules: Spectroscopic and ab Initio Investigation of Water Complexes of Fluorophenylacetylenes". Journal of Physical Chemistry. 113 (9): 1760–1769. Bibcode:2009JPCA..113.1760M. doi:10.1021/jp809121n. PMID 19206507.
- Sohidul Islam Mondal, Saumik Sen, Anirban Hazra, G. Naresh Patwari (2017). "π-Stacked Dimers of Fluorophenylacetylenes: Role of Dipole Moment". Journal of Physical Chemistry. 121 (18): 3383–3391. Bibcode:2017JPCA..121.3383M. doi:10.1021/acs.jpca.7b00209. PMID 28406637.

== See also ==
- Rotational–vibrational spectroscopy
