= B. J. Rao =

Indian biologist (born 1956)

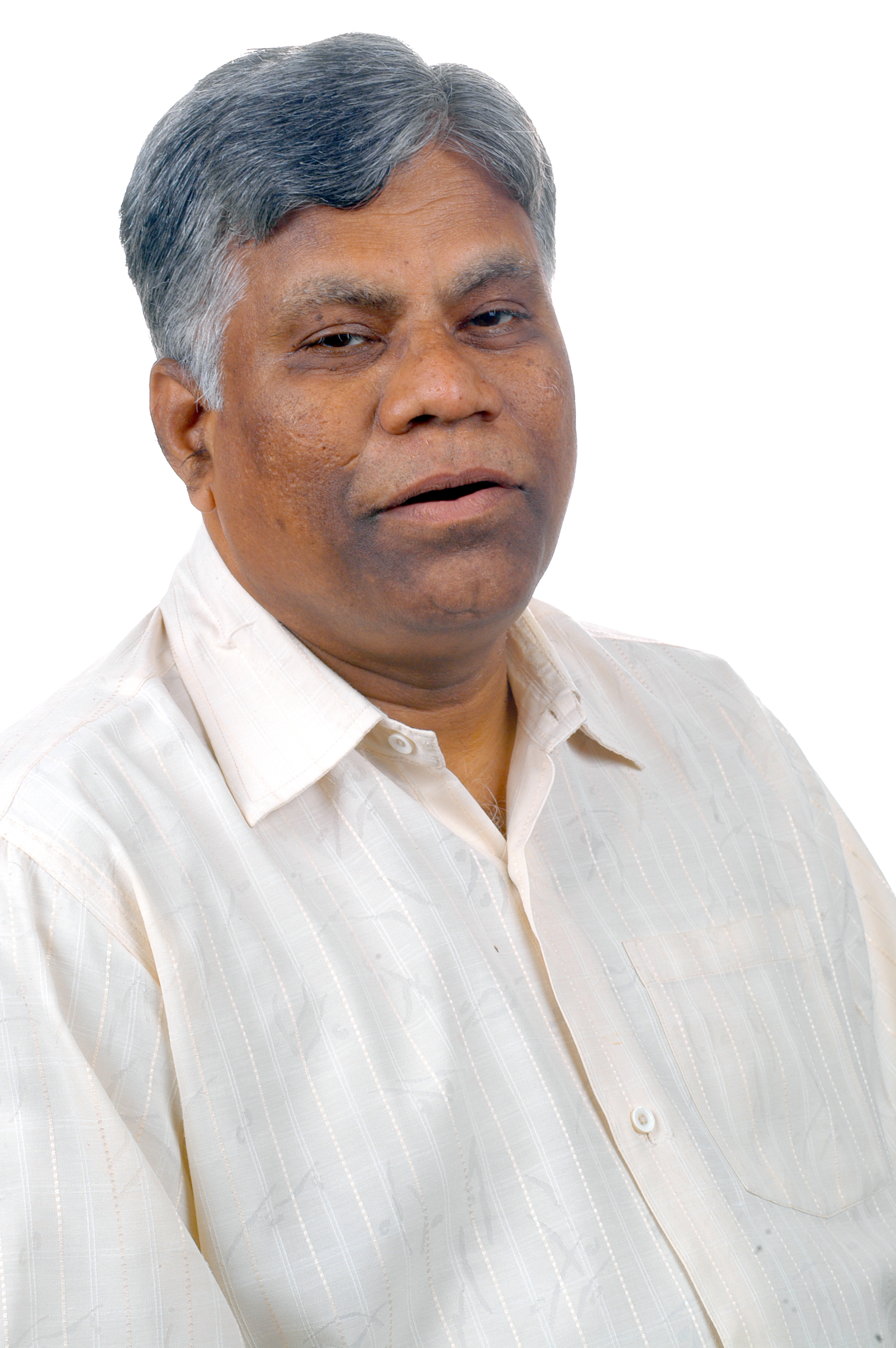
- Born: Basuthkar Jagadeeshwar Rao; 13 March 1956 (age 70); Andhra Pradesh, India
- Education: Yale School of Medicine, Indian Institute of Sciences, Osmania University
- Scientific career
- Fields: Biological science
- Workplaces: University of Hyderabad, IISER Tirupati, Tata Institute of Fundamental Research,
- Website: www.tifr.res.in/~dbs/faculty/BJ_Rao.html

Basuthkar Jagadeeshwar Rao (born 13 March 1956) is an Indian biologist who served as the Vice-Chancellor of University of Hyderabad, Telangana. Prior to this, he was a senior professor at the Department of Biological Sciences at IISER Tirupati before that he served at TIFR, Mumbai and the head of Mechanism of Genome Dynamics and Cellular Adaptations Laboratory, TIFR. His areas of specialisations are molecular basis of genome dynamics, computational biology of genomes and protein active sites, cellular physiology and metabolism, to which he made fundamental contributions. Apart from his fundamental research in the domain of biology, he is also interested in dissemination of scientific knowledge and outreach activities.

== Early life ==
Rao obtained his BSc from Nizam College and his MSc from Osmania University, Hyderabad. He then obtained PhD from Indian Institute of Sciences, Bangalore in the domain of Biochemistry. He then went on to do his post-doctoral work at Yale Medical School where he served as research scientist for about seven years. He then returned to India and started working at TIFR in various capacities, from being a reader to associate professor and a chairperson.Thereafter, in 2018 he became a senior Professor at IISER Tirupati. Following that, in July 2021 he became Vice- Chancellor at University of Hyderabad until March 2026.

== Research ==
He is primarily interested in:

- Mechanisms Genome instability-Repairs & Spatial dynamics of Chromosomal Territories vis-à- vis Genome Repair.
- Cellular signalling & Tissue homeostasis vis-à- vis Genome repair.
- Biophysics of genome repair.
- Computational Biology: Computational Genomics of organellar genomes; Computational analyses of protein active site geometry, evolution and promiscuity rules.
- Cell Biology of Chlamydomonas reinhardtii (a green yeast): cellular adaptive responses, metabolic and circadian rhythmicity, metabolic plasticity regulation by in cell NMR.

== Collaborations and genome dynamics Lab ==
. .

Rao and his collaborators of Genome Dynamics Lab are interested in mapping and understanding the promiscuity scores of protein active sites with the help of computational approaches. They are also dissecting the biochemical mechanism of regulation of homologous recombination by tumour suppressors such as P53 and BRCA2 proteins.

Other activities include:

- Chromosome territory movements associated with DNA damage response events in mammalian cells; Circadian control of UV-sensitivity in Chlamydomonas reinhardii
- Cell biology and metabolism in Chlamydomonas reinhardtii during adaptive stress responses.

The Lab is also involved in collaborative projects with chemists and physicists at TIFR to seek answers, for instance how “soft electrons” (≈10eV) intersect and change biomolecules etc., along with many other interdisciplinary research proposals.

== Recognition and outreach ==
He is a Fellow of all three National Academies in India, and is also the Sir JC Bose Fellow of Department of Science & Technology, India. He is also serving as a chief member and an advisor for various committees and has won many awards and fellowships.

He worked as a DST-inspire teacher by articulating the current excitements of basic biology to a large number of undergraduate students across India. He perceives biology as a complex manifestation of physics-chemistry of a dynamically evolving system and emphasise on design principles in Biology. He has given numerous technical as well as public lectures for varied audiences at conferences as well as at research centers.

== Selected publications ==
- Joshi, Amita; Rao, Basuthkar J (2002). "ATP Hydrolysis Induces Expansion of MutS Contacts on Heteroduplex: A Case for MutS Treadmilling?". Biochemistry. 41 (11): 3654–66. doi:10.1021/bi015743r. PMID 11888282.
- Nag, Nabanita; Rao, B.J; Krishnamoorthy, G (2007). "Altered Dynamics of DNA Bases Adjacent to a Mismatch: A Cue for Mismatch Recognition by MutS". Journal of Molecular Biology. 374 (1): 39–53. doi:10.1016/j.jmb.2007.08.065. PMID 17919654.
- Krishnan, Neeraja M; Rao, Basuthkar J (2009). "A comparative approach to elucidate chloroplast genome replication". BMC Genomics. 10: 237. doi:10.1186/1471-2164-10-237. PMC 2695485. PMID 19457260.
- Mehta, Ishita S; Kulashreshtha, Mugdha; Chakraborty, Sandeep; Kolthur-Seetharam, Ullas; Rao, Basuthkar J (2013). "Chromosome territories reposition during DNA damage-repair response". Genome Biology. 14 (12): R135. doi:10.1186/gb-2013-14-12-r135. PMC 4062845. PMID 24330859.
- Tirumani, Srikanth; Kokkanti, Mallikarjuna; Chaudhari, Vishal; Shukla, Manish; Rao, Basuthkar J (2014). "Regulation of CCM genes in Chlamydomonas reinhardtii during conditions of light–dark cycles in synchronous cultures". Plant Molecular Biology. 85 (3): 277–86. Bibcode:2014PMolB..85..277T. doi:10.1007/s11103-014-0183-z. PMID 24590314. S2CID 8316514.
- Kulashreshtha, Mugdha; Mehta, Ishita S; Kumar, Pradeep; Rao, Basuthkar J (2016). "Chromosome territory relocation during DNA repair requires nuclear myosin 1 recruitment to chromatin mediated by ϒ-H2AX signaling". Nucleic Acids Research. 44 (17): 8272–91. doi:10.1093/nar/gkw573. PMC 5041470. PMID 27365048.
- Himanshu, Singh; Manish, R. Shukla; Basuthkar, J. Rao; Kandala, V.R. Chary (2016). "Regulation of starch, lipids and amino acids upon nitrogen sensing in Chlamydomonas reinhardtii". Algal Research. 18: 33–44. Bibcode:2016AlgRe..18...33H. doi:10.1016/j.algal.2016.05.028.
