= Dhevalapally B. Ramachary =

Indian chemist

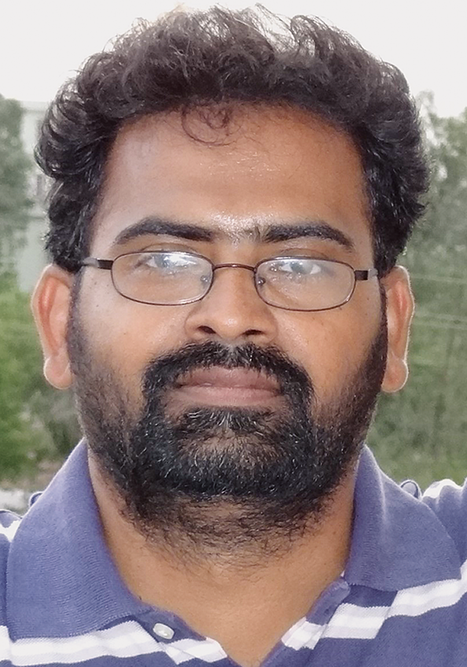
- Born: Thatikal, Nalgonda, India
- Education: University of Hyderabad; Indian Institute of Science; The Scripps Research Institute
- Known for: Organic Chemistry, Organocatalysis, Supramolecular-organocatalysis, Asymmetric Catalysis, Click chemistry
- Awards: ♦ Fellow, Indian National Science Academy, New Delhi (2025) ♦ Fellow, National Academy of Sciences, Allahabad (2021) ♦ Fellow, Royal society of Chemistry, London (2020) ♦ Fellow, Indian Academy of Sciences, Bangalore (2019) ♦ Fellow, Telangana Academy of Sciences, Hyderabad (2016) ♦ Fellow, The Indian National Science Academy, New Delhi (2025)
- Scientific career
- Fields: Chemistry
- Workplaces: University of Hyderabad
- Thesis: Total synthesis of Sesquiterpenes containing three contiguous quarternary carbon atoms (2001)
- Doctoral advisor: Prof. Adusumilli Srikrishna

Dhevalapally B. Ramachary FTAS, FRSC, FASc, FNASc, FNA also known as D. B. Ramachary (born 1973), is an Indian chemist and senior professor at the School of Chemistry, University of Hyderabad. He has made numerous contributions in various fields of chemical science.

== Early life and education ==
D. B. Ramachary was born to Shri Ramalingaiahchary and Ramalingamma in 1973, at Thatikal village, Nakrekal mandal, Nalgonda district of Telangana. He did his early schooling at ZPHS schools at Thatikal and Nakrekal, and later joined for an under graduate BSc programme at Nagarjuna Government College (Autonomous) at Nalgonda (1991–1994). Later, he moved to School of Chemistry, University of Hyderabad for pursuing MSc chemistry (1994–96), and then he obtained a PhD in synthetic organic chemistry under the guidance of Prof. A. Srikrishna at Indian Institute of Science in 1996–2001 for the total synthesis of sesquiterpenes.

Soon after his PhD in 2001, he moved to US as a Skaggs Postdoctoral Fellow and worked with Carlos F. Barbas III at Department of Chemistry and Molecular Biology, The Scripps Research Institute in La Jolla, United States during 2002–2005 for the development of small molecular-catalysis.

== Academic career ==
Ramachary was lecturer (2005–2007), reader (2007–2010), associate professor (2010–2013), professor (2013–2024), and at present he is a senior professor of organic chemistry since 2024 at the Catalysis laboratory, School of Chemistry, University of Hyderabad. He has authored more than 130 research papers.

== Research ==
In 2005, when Ramachary started his own research career at School of Chemistry, UoH, he showed interest towards discovering green reactions and catalysts. His laboratory mainly focused on the development of organocatalytic sequential one-pot reactions, asymmetric supramolecular catalysis and organocatalysis, development of multi-component and multi-catalysis cascade reactions, and metal-free carbonyls based click chemistry.

His laboratory discovered important reactions based on three-component reductive alkylation (TCRA) and push-pull dienamine (PPD) reactions. His research also focuses on the theoretical aspects of organocatalysis in finding out the suitable organocatalyst for stereoselective reactions using computational resources which helps in achieving better synthetic methodologies. Using this, his research group observed the electrostatic and dipole-dipole interactions in proline-catalyzed asymmetric desymmetrization of pro-chiral ketones with nitrosobenzene. He has also examined the trapping or stabilizing of king size pre- or post-transition states of asymmetric reactions by designing new tool ‘asymmetric supramolecular catalysis’ through which characterization of large-size supramolecular rings in the pre-transition state (pre-TS) of enol- or enamine-based Michael reactions for high asymmetric induction was reported. His contributions through original developed reactions were used by organic, medicinal, material chemists and these reactions became well-known organic reactions to be named after him. The reactions which are named after him are: 1) Ramachary Reductive Coupling Reaction, 2) Ramachary-Bressy-Wang Cycloaddition, 3) Ramachary Aminoenyne-catalysis, 4) Ramachary Base Induced Ring Opening (BIRO) Reaction, 5) Ramachary Azide-Carbonyl [3+2]-Cycloaddition.

== Awards and honors ==
- Prof. S. Swaminathan Endowment Award Lecture, Dept. of Chemistry, University of Madras, 17th March 2025
- Fellow, Indian National Science Academy, New Delhi – 2025.
- Research and Innovation Excellence Medal from Chirantan Rasayan Sanstha – 2023.
- Fellow, National Academy of Sciences, Allahabad – 2021.
- Fellow, Royal Society of Chemistry, London – 2020.
- Fellow, Indian Academy of Sciences, Bangalore – 2018.
- Fellow, Telangana Academy of Sciences – 2016.
- International Advisory Board Member, European Journal of Organic Chemistry, January 2017 to present.
- Chemical Research Society of India (CRSI Bronze Medal – 2016.
- The Chancellor Award – 2014.
- Member of Royal Society of Chemistry, 2014 to present.
- B. M. Birla Science Prize in Chemical Sciences – 2011.
- Anil Kumar Bose Memorial Award of the INSA – 2010.
- Associate Fellow of the Andhra Pradesh Academy of Sciences – 2010.
- Member of The National Academy of Sciences, Allahabad – 2009.
- Indian National Science Academy Medal for Young Scientist 2006.
- Member of Chemical Research Society of India (CRSI), Bangalore.
- Author profile published by European Journal of Organic Chemistry.

== Membership in editorial board ==
- Advisory Board Member Sustainability and Circularity NOW (March 2025 - Present)
- Editorial Board Member Tetrahedron and Tetrahedron Letters (March 2024 - Present)
- International Advisory Board Member Tetrahedron Chem (November 2021 - Present)
- International Advisory Board Member European Journal of Organic Chemistry (January 2017 - Present)
- Editorial Advisory Board Member Organic and Biomolecular Chemistry (2013 - Present)
