= U. K. Anandavardhanan =

Indian mathematician

- Born: May 25, 1976 (age 50); India
- Education: University of Calicut; University of Hyderabad
- Known for: Automorphic forms, Representation theory
- Awards: Shanti Swarup Bhatnagar Prize for Science and Technology (2020)
- Scientific career
- Fields: Mathematics
- Workplaces: Indian Institute of Technology Bombay

U. K. Anandavardhanan (born 25 May 1976) is an Indian mathematician specialising in automorphic forms and representation theory. He was awarded the Shanti Swarup Bhatnagar Prize for Science and Technology, the highest science award in India, for the year 2020 in mathematical science category. He is affiliated to Indian Institute of Technology, Bombay.

After completing undergraduate studies in University of Calicut, Anandavardhanan joined University of Hyderabad for further studies. He secured M Sc in mathematics from there in 1998 and Ph D in 2003. He was with Tata Institute of Fundamental Research during February 2003 - July 2005 and spent the spring of 2004 in University of Iowa. He has been a faculty member of Indian Institute of Technology Bombay since July 2005.

== Awards ==
In addition to the Shanti Swarup Bhatnagar Prize, he has been conferred the following awards also:

- Asian Scientist 100, Asian Scientist, 2021
- Young Scientist Platinum Jubilee Award, National Academy of Sciences, India, Allahabad, 2009
- INSA Medal for Young Scientist, Indian National Science Academy, New Delhi, 2008
