= Appa Rao Podile =

Indian scientist

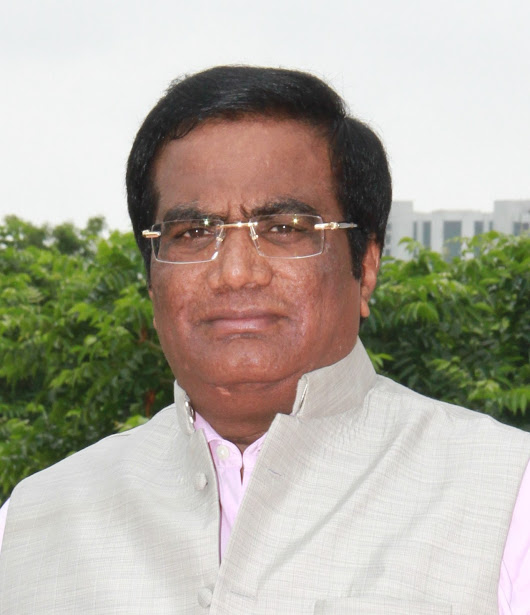
- Professor Appa Rao Podile
- Born: 3 March 1960 (age 66); Borupalem village, Thullur mandal, Guntur district, Andhra Pradesh, India
- Education: Sardar Patel University (PhD)
- Awards: Millennium Plaque of Honour (2017); Indian National Science Academy Fellowship (2001)
- Scientific career
- Fields: Life Sciences
- Workplaces: University of Hyderabad (1989–2021)

Appa Rao Podile (born 3 March 1960) is an Indian scientist, educator and former Vice-Chancellor of the University of Hyderabad. He was awarded the Millennium Plaques of Honour for his achievements in Life Sciences by the Prime Minister of India Narendra Modi in 2017.

A police case was filed against him under the Scheduled Caste and Scheduled Tribe (Prevention of Atrocities) Act against in the case of suicide of Rohith Vemula.

== Education ==
Podile obtained his MSc, and then completed his Ph.D. in 1987 from the Sardar Patel University in Gujarat. He was a postdoctoral fellow (1998) of the Institute of Botany, Academia Sinica, Taipei, Taiwan and subsequently was a visiting scientist (2000), at the Institute of Molecular Biology, Academia Sinica. Podile also completed a postdoctoral fellowship at the Department of Plant Biochemistry and Biotechnology, University of Münster, Germany in 2006. In 2015, he became the vice-chancellor of the University of Hyderabad where he served till 2021.

== Awards and recognition ==
- Fellow, Indian National Science Academy, New Delhi 2017
- Millennium Plaques of Honour, Indian Science Congress Association, Jan 2017 (presented by Prime Minister of India)
- President Elect, Association of Microbiologists of India, 2017
- Elected Fellow, National Academy of Agricultural Sciences, 2012
- Tata Innovation Fellowship, Department of Biotechnology, April 2014
- Fellow, Indian Academy of Sciences, Jan 2014
