= C. Shivappa =

Indian jurist (born 1938)

Justice C. Shivappa
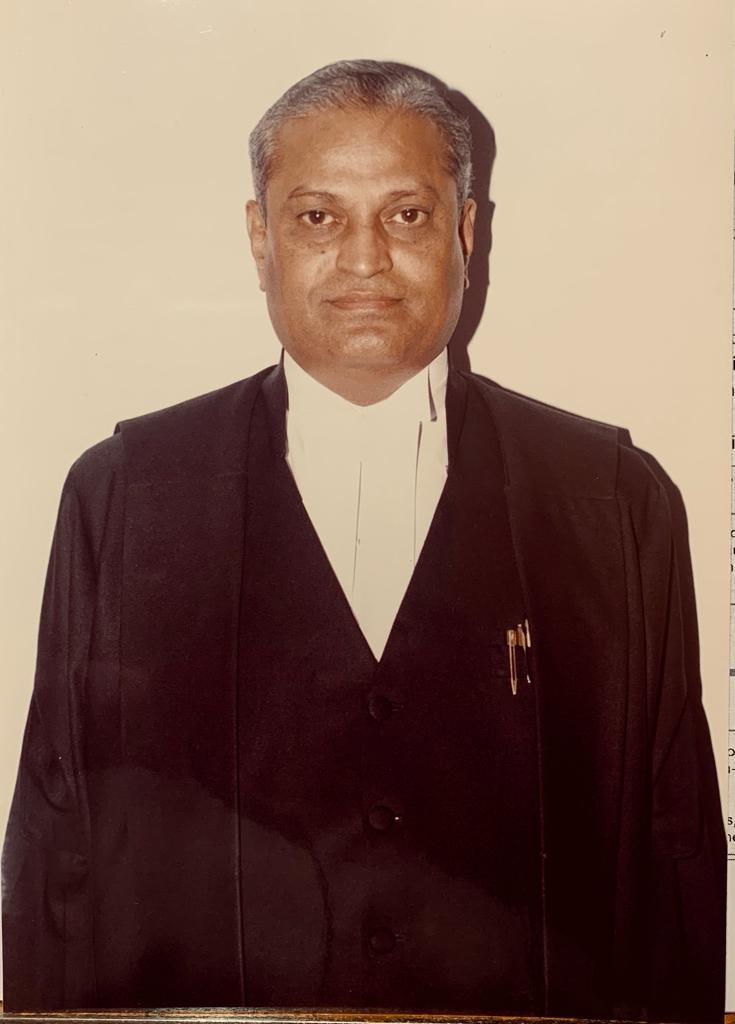
- Justice C. Shivappa

Judge of the Madras High Court
- In office 28-04-1994 – 26-10-1999

Judge of the Karnataka High Court
- In office 05-08-1991 – 28-04-1994

Advocate General of Karnataka
- In office 10-05-1989 – 04-08-1991
- Nominated by: Ramaswamy Venkataraman

C. Shivappa is a former judge and legal scholar who presided over the Criminal and Writ rosters at the High Courts of Madras and Karnataka.

He sentenced the then Chief Minister of the state of Tamil Nadu to jail for corruption. As a practicing senior counsel, he had handled the 'Murder of Advocate M.A. Rasheed' where Cabinet Minister Jalappa was directly involved as the accused.

He was appointed as a Government Advocate at the age of 30. Subsequently he was appointed the Public Prosecutor for the Government of Karnataka. In 1985 he was appointed as Special Counsel to the CBI and later as the Central Government Senior Standing Counsel, He was appointed as the Advocate General of Karnataka in 1989 and held office for two consecutive terms. In 1991, he was appointed as the Judge of the High Court of Karnataka and was transferred to the High Court of Madras in 1994.

== Biography ==
He was born on 11 December 1938, in Chitnahalli village, Pandavpura Taluk, Mandya, Karnataka in a wealthy family of landlords. His higher education was done in Mysore. He obtained his law degree, as well as a master's degree from Sarada Vilas Law College, Mysore.

In 1989 he was appointed as the Advocate General for the State of Karnataka during the Government of S. Bangarappa. He served two consecutive terms and was succeeded by Shri. B.V. Acharya. He was elevated as a Judge of the Karnataka High Court on 05.08. 1991.

He was a judge of the High Court of Karnataka for three years, after which he was transferred to the High Court of Madras.
