= Rohith Vemula =

Indian doctoral student (1989–2016)

- Portrait of Rohith Vemula
- Born: Rohith Chakravarthi Vemula; 30 January 1989; Guntur, Andhra Pradesh, India
- Died: 17 January 2016 (aged 26)
- Cause of death: Suicide
- Education: Hindu College, Guntur; University of Hyderabad
- Mother: Radhika Vemula

Rohith Chakravarthi Vemula (30 January 1989 – 17 January 2016) was an Indian PhD scholar at the University of Hyderabad. His death by suicide on 17 January 2016 drew attention to the alleged systemic discrimination imposed by the caste social hierarchies and enforced by state institutions, sparking widespread protests on various university campuses in India.

Vemula became involved in raising issues of caste injustice on campus under the banner of Ambedkar Students' Association (ASA), an Ambedkarite student organisation. In response, in July 2015 the university stopped paying his monthly stipend of ₹25,000 (equivalent to ₹41,000 or US$430 in 2026) (excluding HRA) with friends alleging that he was targeted for his involvement with the ASA.

A university official denied the allegation, blaming the delay instead on paperwork. On 5 August, the university set up an inquiry against Vemula and four other ASA members, two days after an assault on ABVP leader N. Susheel Kumar.

On 17 August, BJP MP and Union Minister Bandaru Dattatreya wrote to the HRD Minister urging action and claiming that the "Hyderabad University... has in the recent past, become a den of casteist, extremist and anti-national politics".

After a series of flip-flops, the five were suspended in September. On 17 December, the decision was upheld.

After confirmation of the suspension, Vemula committed suicide on 17 January 2016. His death sparked protests and outrage across India and gained widespread media attention as a case of state sponsored discrimination against Dalits in Indian universities. Afterwards, the District Level Scrutiny Committee in Guntur district of Andhra Pradesh, which was reviewing the Dalit status of Rohith Vemula, submitted its final report to the government stating that neither Vemula nor his mother Radhika were Dalits.

His suicide letter became a rallying cry for Dalit youth and was a big factor in the continuation of the Dalit Spring.

== Background and death ==
Vemula was born on 30 January 1989 in Guntur district of the Indian state of Andhra Pradesh to Manikumar Vemula and Radhika Vemula. His father is from the Vaddera caste, classified as an Other Backward Class (OBC) in India's system of Reservations, and his mother is said to be from Mala community by birth, which is a Scheduled Caste, but was adopted by a Vaddera family. It is reported that Radhika was treated differently from the rest of her adoptive family because of her caste. Vemula's own distress in seeing his mother abused and treated as inferior was made clear to his friends. His political activities, based on his and his mother's experiences, suggested that he identified as a Dalit, and was advocating for Dalit rights. A District Level Scrutiny Committee that looked into the caste status of the family declared that neither Vemula nor his mother were Dalits but belonged to the OBC category.

A PhD scholar at the University of Hyderabad, in July 2015 the university reportedly stopped paying Vemula the fellowship of ₹25,000 (equivalent to ₹41,000 or US$430 in 2026) per month after he was "raising issues under the banner of Ambedkar Students Association (ASA)", though a university official denied the allegation of non-payment of scholarship, citing the delay on "paperwork."

At the beginning of August 2015, ASA claims that they organised a seminar or public meeting to discuss the death penalty for Yakub Memon, a convict in 1993 Bombay bombings in which 257 people were killed. Right-wing student organization Akhil Bharatiya Vidyarthi Parishad (ABVP) claims "Vemula and four ASA members held a funeral prayer". ASA also condemned the ABVP protest on the screening of the documentary Muzaffarnagar Baaqi Hai in Delhi University. On 3 August 2015, he and other ASA activists demonstrated at the Hyderabad campus. In response, ABVP's university unit president, Nandanam Susheel Kumar, called them "goons" on Facebook.

The next day, Kumar was taken to hospital and operated for an acute appendicitis, but stated that he was "roughed up by around 40 ASA members who barged into [his] room." (Note: According to reports, Susheel Kumar was admitted to hospital on 4 August by his brother, where he was operated upon for acute appendicitis on 7 August. Dr Anupama Rao, Senior Medical Officer of the University of Hyderabad, said: "After collecting all the medical reports of Susheel Kumar and examining them, I could not reach the conclusion that he developed appendicitis due to the alleged assault. There was one line that there was a bruise on his left shoulder. I could not say if he was allegedly punched or beaten up. I did not examine him as he did not come to me and the hospital's report does not mention that he had any external or visible injury.".)

According to The Indian Express, an anonymous ASA member stated that "When we confronted Susheel in his hostel room, he tendered a written apology in the presence of the university's security officer. But the next day he got himself admitted in a hospital and alleged that members of ASA had manhandled him. The university ordered an inquiry while ABVP lodged a police complaint."

According to the publication, "the ABVP wrote to BJP MP from Secunderabad and Union Minister Dattatreya, alleging that the ASA members were indulging in 'casteist' and 'anti-national' activities. Dattatreya stated that he "forwarded the letter on my official letterhead to Union HRD Minister Smriti Irani. I do not know what happened after that. ABVP or BJP has nothing to do with that." The letter was then forwarded to the university's Vice-Chancellor professor P. Appa Rao. In response, further action was taken against Vemula by the college on 5 August 2015, expelling him from his hostel along with the other four members of the Ambedkar Students Association (ASA), while "ABVP's Kumar was let off with a warning."

In September, the five students were suspended, a decision which was upheld on 17 December 2015. Meanwhile, his family struggled to help him, and Vemula had to borrow money from a friend. On 3 January 2016, after the suspension was confirmed, "the five moved out of their hostel rooms to a tent they set up inside the campus and began a "relay hunger protest." On 17 January 2016, Vemula committed suicide, hanging himself with an ASA banner. In his suicide note, he blamed the "system" for his death. According to the suicide note, he committed suicide in the room of one Umma Anna, in whose room he was staying after being expelled from the hostel by the authorities at the University of Hyderabad. The note also said:

The value of a man was reduced to his immediate identity and nearest possibility. To a vote. To a number. To a thing. Never was a man treated as a mind. As a glorious thing made up of stardust. In very field, in studies, in streets, in politics, and in dying and living.

I am writing this kind of letter for the first time. My first time of a final letter. Forgive me if I fail to make sense. Maybe I was wrong, all the while, in understanding world. In understanding love, pain, life, death. There was no urgency. But I always was rushing. Desperate to start a life. All the while, some people, for them, life itself is curse. My birth is my fatal accident. I can never recover from my childhood loneliness. The unappreciated child from my past. I am not hurt at this moment. I am not sad. I am just empty. Unconcerned about myself. That's pathetic. And that's why I am doing this.
People may dub me as a coward. And selfish, or stupid once I am gone. I am not bothered about what I am called. I don't believe in after-death stories, ghosts, or spirits. If there is anything at all I believe, I believe that I can travel to the stars. And know about the other worlds.

I forgot to write the formalities. No one is responsible for my this act of killing myself. No one has instigated me, whether by their acts or by their words to this act. This is my decision and I am the only one responsible for this.

Smriti Irani told the Lok Sabha that no doctor was allowed to help Vemula and that "Instead, his body was used as a political tool. No police was allowed till 6:30AM the following morning." However, the Chief Medical Officer of the university, M. Rajashree, denied that was the case.

His father, Manikumar, has alleged that his son's death was not suicide and demanded a judicial inquiry.

Dattatreya was accused of being responsible for the suicide. According to Dattatreya's critics, his letter to the Education Minister, complaining about degraded student politics, had led to Vemula's suspension and ultimate suicide. Vemula's suicide letter did not blame anyone, and Dattatreya denied these allegations. After a complaint from students of the University of Hyderabad a police case was filed under the Scheduled Caste and Scheduled Tribe (Prevention of Atrocities) Act against Bandaru Dattatreya, Bharatiya Janata Party's MP from Secunderabad and Indian government's Minister of Labour and Employment; Ramachandra Rao (BJP MLC); and Appa Rao Podile (University of Hyderabad Vice-Chancellor).

== Caste status controversy ==
Rohith had a Scheduled Caste certificate for Hyderabad University admission. After External Affairs Minister Sushma Swaraj claimed that Rohith Vemula was not a Dalit, a police investigation was started to determine his caste status. The case against Dattatreya, Rao and Podile was likely to collapse if Vemula was not a Dalit. His brother's caste certificate lists him as Vaddera, and Vemula's uncle gave a statement to the police that Rohith's father was from that caste, which is classified as a Backward and non-scheduled caste in Andhra Pradesh.

The District Level Scrutiny Committee in Guntur district of Andhra Pradesh, which was reviewing the Dalit status of Rohith Vemula, submitted its final report to the government stating that neither Rohith nor his mother Radhika were Dalits.

However, according to the documentary film Rohith Vemula made by Srikanth Chintala, Radhika Vemula's foster mother clearly stated that Radhika Vemula was adopted by her and she belonged to a Dalit community. A video of Rohith Vemula's father Mani Kumar also stated in the documentary film that Radhika Vemula belonged to a Scheduled Caste. In Rajendra Shrivastava vs State of Maharashtra (2010), the question raised was this: "If a woman, who by birth belongs to a scheduled caste or a scheduled tribe marries a man belonging to a forward caste, whether on marriage she ceases to belong to the scheduled caste or the scheduled tribe?" The full bench of the Bombay high court relied on the constitution bench decision of the Supreme Court in the case of V.V. Giri vs D. Suri Dora (1959), where it was held that caste is acquired by birth and does not undergo a change by marriage or adoption.

On 14 April 2016, on Ambedkar Jayanti, Rohit Vemula's mother Radhika Vemula and brother Raja Vemula converted to Buddhism in Mumbai, Maharashtra. Rohith Vemula was cremated in a Buddhist manner. After the funeral, his brother Raja Vemula had said that Rohit had always been a humanitarian at heart. He believed in the compassion and humanity of Buddhism.

In May 2024, the Telangana Police filed a closure report with the Telangana High Court, concluding that Rohith Vemula was not a Dalit but belonged to the Vaddera (OBC) caste. The report suggested that his suicide may have been influenced by fears that his caste identity would be exposed, as he and his family had obtained Scheduled Caste certificates. The police found no evidence that actions by university officials or others directly led to Vemula’s suicide.

== Reactions ==
His suicide sparked protests and outrage from across India and gained widespread media attention as an alleged case of discrimination against Dalits and low status castes in India, in which elite educational institutions have been purportedly seen as hotbeds of caste-based discrimination against students belonging to lower caste.

In his suicide note, 26-year-old Rohith had shared that he always wanted to be a science writer like Carl Sagan. Ann Druyan, Sagan's third wife, depressed by discrimination against Dalit students, said that she mourned Rohith's death and lost promise, and responded to Rohith's words in a letter:

To read his suicide note and to learn the details of his predicament is to get a vivid inkling of the actual cost of bias to our civilization. If we could somehow quantify the totality of lost contributions and innovations as a result of prejudice, I believe we would find it staggering [...] You tell me, Rajeev: Is it possible that the attention paid to Rohit's story will lessen its chronic repetition? I am trying to find something hopeful in an otherwise heartbreaking example of needless suffering and squandered potential.

Rohith's suicide was described as "institutional murder" by Bahujan Samaj Party leader Mayawati, The poet Ashok Vajpeyi returned his D.Litt. degree awarded to him by the University of Hyderabad in protest against the circumstances which led to the death of Vemula, for which Vajpeyi holds the university culpable.

An open letter was written to the vice-chancellor of the University of Hyderabad by over 120 academics around the world, protesting against the role of the university in the events.

Rohith's mother, Radhika Vemula fought to bring justice to the death of her son. She started 'Mothers for nation yatra' to protest her son's death.
