= Apparao M. Rao =

American physicist (born 1961)

- Born: India
- Occupation: Physicist
- Title: Robert A. Bowen Endowed Professor of Physics, Founding Director of the Clemson Nanomaterials Institute, and Former Associate Dean for Discovery in the College of Science, Clemson University

Academic background
- Education: University of Kentucky

Academic work
- Discipline: Condensed Matter Physics

Apparao M Rao is the Robert A. Bowen Endowed Professor of Physics in the department of physics and astronomy, the founding director of the Clemson Nanomaterials Institute, and a former associate dean for discovery in the college of science at Clemson University. His research in nanoscience and nanotechnology has been cited over 59,000 times in open literature and his h-index is 107. He is a Fellow of the American Physical Society, the American Association for the Advancement of Science, the National Academy of Inventors, and the Materials Research Society. In 2012, he received the Alumni Award for Outstanding Achievements in Research, and has served on the Advisory Panel for the Dean and the Vice-President of Research, Clemson University. His research and development efforts led to the establishment of Clemson Nanomaterials Institute, which supports sustainable research and development capacity and competitiveness in the U.S. and the State of South Carolina. The State of South Carolina conferred on him its highest honor - the 2014 Governor’s award for excellence in scientific research.

Rao is an adjunct professor at the Sri Sathya Sai Institute of Higher Learning, India where he initiated a nanomaterials program, and directs research projects of M.S. and Ph.D. students. He is also the Brahm Prakash Endowed Visiting Chair Professor, Indian Institute of Science, Bengaluru, India.

== Accomplishments ==
Rao has developed a number of technologies for spectroscopic characterization of nanocarbon allotropes, synthesis methods for controlling the morphologies of carbon nanotubes or CNTs, and scalable nano-manufacturing of CNT-based devices.

Rao's research also includes the discovery of novel phenomena in nanocarbon systems, device development for electronics, photonics, and drug delivery. Rao's research includes the following topics:

- The photo-induced polymerization of solid C60, photo-enhanced oxidation of solid C60 diameter selective Raman scattering from single walled CNTs, and the demonstration that CNTs can be subjected to redox doping for tunable electronic properties, similar to graphite.
- Fullerenes and conducting polymers, synthesis and demonstration of logic functions in branched CNTs.
- Raman evidence for renormalized electron and phonon energies near a charged defect in doped CNTs.
- Raman evidence for phonon bottle necks in single walled CNTs.
- Observation of superconductivity in boron doped CNTs.

Rao's Raman spectroscopic studies of fullerenes and CNTs helped make Raman spectroscopy an important tool of nanocarbon research. Rao’s other research includes the synthesis and measurement of electrical and mechanical properties of nonlinear CNT morphologies, such as branched and helical CNT forms which exploit unique functionality at the nanoscale. His group demonstrated double decoupling of thermoelectric devices with a high figure of merit and compatibility factor. His recent research focuses on energy harnessing (e.g., harvesting near room temperature waste heat) and energy storage (e.g., supercapacitors and batteries) technologies.

== Honors & awards ==
- 2020 Fellow, Materials Research Society.
- 2018 Fellow, National Academy of Inventors.
- 2016 Recognized by the Board of Trustees as one of the top three faculty members in the College of Engineering and Science, Clemson University.
- 2014 Governor’s Award for Excellence in Scientific Research, South Carolina.
- 2012 Alumni Award for Outstanding Achievement in Research, Clemson University.
- 2011 Fellow, American Association for the Advancement of Science.
- 2010 R. A. Bowen Endowed Professor of Physics, Clemson University.
- 2008 Fellow, American Physical Society.
- 2007 Panel member for the World Technology Evaluation Center to evaluate carbon nanotube manufacturing capabilities in Europe and Asia.
- 2006 Faculty Achievement Award, Clemson University, for exemplary leadership in the sciences.
