= Goverdhan Mehta =

Indian chemist (born 1943)

- Born: 26 June 1943 (age 83); Jodhpur, Jodhpur State, British India (now in Rajasthan, India)
- Education: BITS Pilani; Pune University
- Awards: 1978 Shanti Swarup Bhatnagar Prize (Chemical Sciences); 1999 Officer of the Order of Academic Palms (France); 2001 Padma Shri; 2004 Knight of the Legion of Honour (France); 2005 Fellow of the Royal Society (FRS); 2016 Cross of the Order of Merit of the Federal Republic of Germany
- Scientific career
- Fields: Organic Chemistry
- Workplaces: University of Hyderabad (1977–1998); Indian Institute of Science (1998–2010); University of Hyderabad (2010–present )
- Doctoral advisor: Dr. Sukh Dev

Goverdhan Mehta (born 26 June 1943) is an Indian researcher and scientist. From 1998-2005 he was the director of the Indian Institute of Science (IISc). Previously from 1977-1998, Mehta was a professor of chemistry and vice-chancellor at the University of Hyderabad. Mehta has authored over 550 research papers.

== Education ==
Mehta received his BSc and MSc from the BITS Pilani and PhD from Pune University in 1967. His post-doctoral research was at the Michigan State University under Prof. Don Farnum and at the Ohio State University under Prof. Paul G. Gassman.

== Work ==
He joined IIT Kanpur in 1969 and remained there until 1977. From 1977 to 1998, he was Professor of Chemistry at the University of Hyderabad and from 1998 to 2010, he was a professor at the Indian Institute of Science Bangalore. Since 2010, he is university distinguished professor and holds the Dr. Kallam Anji Reddy Chair at Department of Chemistry, University of Hyderabad, India. From 2010-2018, Mehta was the Lilly-Jubilant Chair Professor at Department of Chemistry, University of Hyderabad, India.

Mehta has authored more than 550 research papers. He is a recipient of over 40 honorary doctorates from India/abroad and has delivered over 300 invited/plenary/award lectures at Universities/Institutions across the world. He has been a member of the scientific advisory council to the prime minister and also the scientific advisory committee to the Cabinet.

== Academic and Professional positions ==
- Research associate, Michigan State and the Ohio State Universities, US,1967–1969
- Lecturer and assistant professor, Indian Institute of Technology, Kanpur, 1969–1977
- Professor, University of Hyderabad, Hyderabad 1977–1998, Founder Dean 1977–1986
- Honorary professor, Jawaharlal Nehru Centre for Advanced Scientific Research, 1990–2009
- Visiting professor, University of Notre Dame, Indiana, USA, Jun-1990
- Srinivasa Ramanujan Research Professor, Indian National Science Academy, 1992–1997
- Vice-chancellor, University of Hyderabad, 1994–98
- Professor, Department of Organic Chemistry, Indian Institute of Science, 1998–2005
- Director, Indian Institute of Science, Bangalore, 1998–2005
- Tarrant Distinguished Professor, University of Florida, Gainesville, USA, Jun-2002
- CSIR Bhatnagar Fellow, Indian Institute of Science, Bangalore, 2005–2010
- National Research Professor, 2009–2014
- Lilly-Jubilant Chair Professor, University of Hyderabad, 2010–2018
- Dr. Kallam Anji Reddy Chair, University of Hyderabad, 2018–

== Awards ==
- Shanti Swarup Bhatnagar Prize for Science and Technology in Chemical Sciences awarded by CSIR (1978)
- Basudev Bannerji Medal & Prize awarded by Indian Chemical Society (1979)
- Science & Technology Award of Rajasthan Government (1980)
- Professor R.D. Desai Medal & Prize awarded by Indian Chemical Society (1982)
- FICCI Award in Physical Sciences (1983)
- Golden Jubilee Commemoration Medal (Chemical Sciences) awarded by Indian National Science Academy (1989)
- G.D. Birla Award for Excellence in Science (1992)
- Goyal Prize in Chemical Sciences awarded by Sri Kala Ram Trust (1994)
- Pandit Jawaharlal Nehru National Award for Excellence in Science awarded by MP Government (1994)
- Humboldt Prize (Humboldt-Forschungspreis) awarded by the Alexander von Humboldt Foundation of Germany (1995) (first in India)
- Acharya P.C. Ray Medal awarded by Indian Chemical Society (1995)
- Dr. Y. Nayudamma Gold Medal awarded by Andhra Pradesh Akademi of Sciences (now Telangana Academy of Sciences) (1998)
- Padma Shri awarded by Government of India (2001)
- TWAS Medal awarded by World Academy of Sciences (2001)
- Millennium Plaque of Honour awarded by Indian Science Congress Association (2002)
- C V Raman Medal awarded by Indian National Science Academy (2003)
- Legion of Honour awarded by Republic of France (2004)
- Rajvotsava Award by Karnataka Government (2004)
- Centenary Prize awarded by Royal Society of Chemistry (2005)
- Trieste Science Prize awarded by World Academy of Sciences (2007)
- G M Modi Award for Innovative Science and Technology (2007)
- H. K. Firodia Award for Science & Technology (2010)
- Distinguished Alumnus Award from BITS Pilani (2011)
- Order of Merit of the Federal Republic of Germany (2016)
- INSA Medal for Promotion and Service to Science (2017)
- Dr Sukh Dev ICS Centennial Jubilee Award awarded by Indian Chemical Society (2023)

== Fellowships ==
- Fellow of the Indian National Science Academy
- Fellow of the Indian Academy of Sciences
- Fellow of the National Academy of Sciences
- Fellow of the World Academy of Sciences
- Fellow of the Royal Society
- Foreign Member of the Russian Academy of Sciences
- Fellow of the World Innovation Foundation (WIF)
- Fellow of the Royal Society of Chemistry
- Fellow of Indian Chemical Society
- Fellow of the Andhra Pradesh Akademi of Sciences (now Telangana Academy of Sciences)
- Founding Member of Society for Scientific Values

== Important positions ==
- President of Indian National Science Academy (1999-2001)
- Co-chair (with Bruce Alberts of US NAS) of the Inter Academy Council (IAC) (2000-2005)
- President, Chemical Research Society of India (2002-2005)
- President, Association of Indian Universities (2003)
- President of ICSU (2005-2008)
- Chairperson, National Accreditation and Assessment (NAAC) (2006-2012)
- Jury Member for Physical Sciences, Infosys Prize (2012–2015)
- Chairman, board of governors, Indian Institute of Technology Jodhpur (2014-2018)
- Chairman, Indian Statistical Institute, Kolkata (2016-2020)
- Chairperson, Council of Management, Jawaharlal Nehru Centre for Advanced Scientific Research (JNCASR) (2018-2022)
- Member, board of directors, Dr. Reddy's Institute of Life Sciences
- Chairman and member, University Grants Commission Panel on Chemistry (1983–93)
- Member, Science & Engineering Research Council (SERC) (1984–90), (1994–97)
- Member, Scientific Advisory Committee, Ministry of Petroleum & Natural Gas (1984–88)
- Member, Government of India Scientific Commission on Bhopal Gas Leakage (1985–87)
- Chairman, National Committee for IUPAC (1991–93)
- Member, India-European Union (EU) Round Table of Eminent Persons

== Controversy ==
In 2006, the US Government refused Mehta a visa; this decision was strongly criticised by Indian and American scientists. The US ambassador to India David Mulford offered his apology to Mehta.

== Publications ==
- Mehta, Goverdhan; Murthy, A. Narayana; Reddy, D. Sivakumar; Reddy, A. Veera (1986). "A general approach to linearly fused triquinane natural products. Total syntheses of (.+-.)-hirsutene, (.+-.)-coriolin, and (.+-.)-capnellene". Journal of the American Chemical Society. 108 (12). American Chemical Society (ACS): 3443–3452. Bibcode:1986JAChS.108.3443M. doi:10.1021/ja00272a046. ISSN 0002-7863.
- Mehta, Goverdhan; Padma, S. (1987). "D2h-bishomohexaprismane ("garudane"). Design of the face-to-face 2 + 2 dimer of norbornadiene". Journal of the American Chemical Society. 109 (23). American Chemical Society (ACS): 7230–7232. Bibcode:1987JAChS.109.7230M. doi:10.1021/ja00257a076. ISSN 0002-7863.
- Mehta, Goverdhan; Khan, Faiz Ahmed (1990). "Electronic control of .pi.-facial selectivities in nucleophilic additions to 7-norbornanones". Journal of the American Chemical Society. 112 (16). American Chemical Society (ACS): 6140–6142. Bibcode:1990JAChS.112.6140M. doi:10.1021/ja00172a047. ISSN 0002-7863.
- Mehta, Goverdhan; Reddy, S. Hari Krishna (1993). "Golcondane: A Novel, Caged, Nonacyclic C20H24-Hydrocarbon ofD2d Symmetry". Angewandte Chemie International Edition in English. 32 (8). Wiley: 1160–1161. doi:10.1002/anie.199311601. ISSN 0570-0833.
- Mehta, Goverdhan; Singh, S. Robindro (30 January 2006). "Total Synthesis of (±)-Merrilactone A". Angewandte Chemie International Edition. 45 (6). Wiley: 953–955. doi:10.1002/anie.200503618. ISSN 1433-7851. PMID 16381043.
