= University of Hyderabad =

Central university in Hyderabad, Telangana, India

University of Hyderabad (UoH)
- Official seal of UoH
- Former name: Hyderabad Central University
- Motto: सा विद्या या विमुक्तये Sā vidyā yā vimuktayē
- Motto in English: "Gaining education leads to liberation."
- Type: Institution of Eminence (IoE); Public Central Research Institution
- Established: 1974; 52 years ago
- Founder: Parliament of India
- Accreditation: UGC; AICTE
- Affiliations: AIU; ACU
- Chancellor: Justice L. Narasimha Reddy (Retd.)
- Vice-Chancellor: J. Anuradha (I/C)
- Rector: Governor of Telangana
- Visitor: President of India
- Students: 5,322
- Location: Gachibowli, Hyderabad, Telangana, India; 17.4599791°N 78.3320099°E
- Campus: 930 ha (2,300 acres); Urban
- Website: uohyd.ac.in

- Location in University of Hyderabad Location in Telangana Location in India Location in Asia Location in Earth

The University of Hyderabad (UoH) is a public central research university located in Gachibowli, Hyderabad, Telangana, India. Established in 1974, this mostly residential campus has more than 5,000 students and 400 faculty, from several disciplines. UoH has a 930-hectare (2,300-acre) campus.

University of Hyderabad (UoH) was officially recognized as an Institution of Eminence by the Ministry of Education on 17 February 2020. As an IoE, UoH receives funds for their classes.

The University of Hyderabad is ranked 18th among Indian universities, 26th overall, 33rd in research, and 74th in post-graduate engineering by the NIRF 2025 Rankings. The campus is rich in flora and fauna, home to over 734 flower plants, 10 species of mammals, 15 species of reptiles, and 220 species of birds.

== History ==
The University of Hyderabad (UoH), also known as Hyderabad Central University, was established in 1974 by an Act of Parliament. It was founded as part of the Six-Point Formula of 1973, which aimed to address regional disparities in education and development in the state of Andhra Pradesh (now Telangana). The university began its academic journey in 'The Golden Threshold' (GT), a historic estate in the heart of Hyderabad, which was bequeathed to the university by Sarojini Naidu's family. Built in an Indo-European style of architecture, the Golden Threshold housed the university until it moved into its sprawling 930-hectare (2,300-acre) campus in Gachibowli.

In January 2015, the University of Hyderabad received the Visitor's Award for the Best Central University in India, awarded by the President of India.

== Campus ==
The university campus is on 930-odd hectares (2,300 acres), and has a large area under forest cover, with two perennial and three seasonal lakes, and rock formations characteristic of the Deccan. It is home to 734 plants, 10 mammals, 15 reptiles and 220 birds species (at last count). Notable animals include spotted deer, hares, peacocks, porcupines and wild boar. The campus also has a protected megalithic site.

A study, which ranged over three decades (1990–2010), reported that of the plants present on campus, 315 species were used in traditional Indian medicine. 39 species of plants belonging to the group that faces the threat of extinction. These listings resulted from field studies done on campus by students and faculty members.

The university has plans to preserve the area under forest cover and wetlands by creating a bioreserve.

== Academics ==
=== Teaching and learning ===
The university follows the semester calendar beginning in mid-July and ending in early-May. About 90% of the students are residential. The Master's programme is usually of 2 years while the MPhil and PhD programme are of 18 months and 5 years respectively.

The university follows the continuous assessment pattern, with 40% marks awarded through assignments spread out through the semester and 60% through semester-end examinations. Grading is on a 10.0 point scale, with D being the lowest passing grade, and A+ being the highest. The toppers of the post-graduate courses are awarded medals.

=== Admission ===
The university is primarily a post-graduate research university. The university offers integrated M.Sc., M.A., MFA, M.Tech., M.B.A, M.C.A., MPhil and PhD degrees. Admissions to UoH are highly competitive. The university follows the positive-discrimination reservation system as per University Grants Commission of India guidelines. For the Integrated Master's Programme (I.M.A. and I.M.Sc.), University takes admission through CUET-UG. For (I.M.tech), University takes admission through Jee Mains. It releases merits based on the score in CUET-UG, Jee Mains and then they have to report in-person in the university and based on ranks in merit list they are given preferences for the admission. For IMA, first three years, classes would be in CIS (College for Integrated Studies) & for IMSc, first two years classes would be in CIS, then they are transferred to their respective departments and schools. Students can Exit after three or four years respectively with Bachelor's (General) & Bachelor's (Hons) degree from the university.

=== Rankings ===
University rankings

General – international
- QS (World) (2025): 801-850
- QS (Asia) (2024): 239

General – India
- NIRF (Overall) (2024): 25
- NIRF (Research) (2024): 28
- NIRF (Universities) (2024): 17

Engineering – India
- NIRF (2024): 70

The University of Hyderabad was ranked 801–850 in the QS World University Rankings of 2025. It is ranked 25th in India overall and 17th in India among universities by the National Institutional Ranking Framework in 2024. In 2020, the university was ranked 2nd among India's government universities by India Today.

=== Library ===
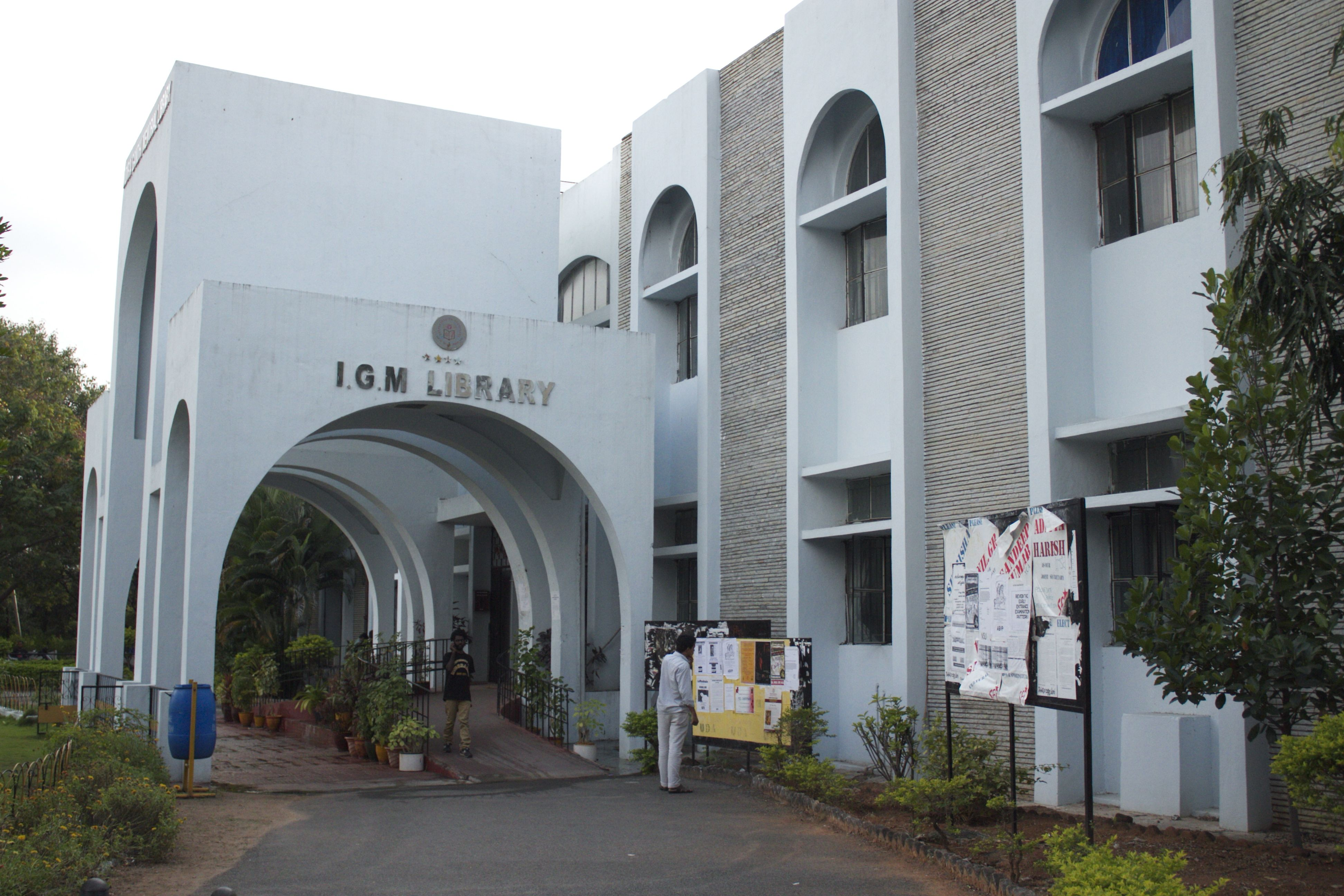
Indira Gandhi Memorial Library

The university library is a central facility to support teaching and research activities of the university. This present library building was inaugurated by Shankar Dayal Sharma, the then Vice President of India, on 21 October 1988 and named after late Prime Minister Indira Gandhi.

The library is connected to Campus Network. The library also created learning environment by establishing Online Public Access Catalog (WebOPAC), OPAC Searching Area, Internet browsing area, Laptop zone with Wi-Fi facility, specialised workstations & software for visually-challenged students and by facilitating electronic resources, search services/tools.

Indira Gandhi Memorial library is the first automated university library in the country. The library serves as a resources station to all scholars and has a print collection around 400,000, that include monographs, text books, back volumes of journals, theses / dissertations, CDs/DVDs. It subscribes around 500 print journals in various disciplines of the university and provides access to more than 25,000 e-resources including e-books. It also comprises a reading room which is accessible round-the-clock for the benefit of the students.

=== The Integrated Master's Programme ===
To support its educational mission, the university established the Centre for Integrated Studies (CIS) in the academic year 2006–07. The CIS offers five-year Integrated master's degree programs across various disciplines, aiming to provide specialized, in-depth education to students who have completed their higher secondary education (10+2 level).It was renamed as College for Integrated Studies in 2014.

The college offers 5-year Integrated master's degree courses in Science, Humanities, Economics and Social Science subjects.The five-year Integrated M.A. (I.M.A.) and M.Sc. (I.M.Sc.) courses of the University of Hyderabad are trans-disciplinary programmes with core and elective subjects.

CIS Facilities and Student Support

CIS Library: The Centre for Integrated Studies (CIS) offers a dedicated library for its students, currently housing approximately 12,000 books, including multiple copies. The library includes a separate newspaper section featuring nine different editions and eight magazines, along with numerous academic journals.

IT Lab: The CIS IT lab provides students with access to approximately 120 computers. The lab hosts IT classes, and outside of class hours, students are encouraged to utilize this space for independent learning and research.

Lab for Visually Challenged Students: CIS maintains a specialized lab for visually challenged students, featuring 10 computer systems with assistive technology, including a Braille printer, JAWS and NVDA screen-reading software, and a ZOOM-X scanner.

Academic Counsellors: CIS employs four academic counsellors who support students with program-specific academic issues, acting as the primary contact point for any academic concerns or guidance needed.

Student Mentorship: Recognizing the challenges of transitioning to university life, CIS appoints one faculty member from each department as a mentor for newly admitted students in each program. Mentors assist students throughout their program, offering guidance and monitoring their progress.

Student Clubs: To foster extracurricular engagement, the university sponsors several student-run clubs, including:

- Zenith Astronomy Club
- TechnoClub
- Junior Science Club & Experiment Forum
- Shape Your Thought & Debate Club

Each club is student-led with elected coordinators and faculty guidance. Activities span guest lectures, film screenings, quizzes, debates, workshops, and sports.

Vigyanotsav: The Junior Science Club hosts an annual science fest, Vigyanotsav, which invites local school children to explore CIS laboratories and participate in activities such as science talks, quiz competitions, and scientific demonstrations..

Psychological Counselling: The university provides psychological support, with two counsellors available on campus. Students can access counseling services as needed, and the DSW office organizes orientation sessions and group workshops throughout the year.

=== SIP: The Study in India Programme ===
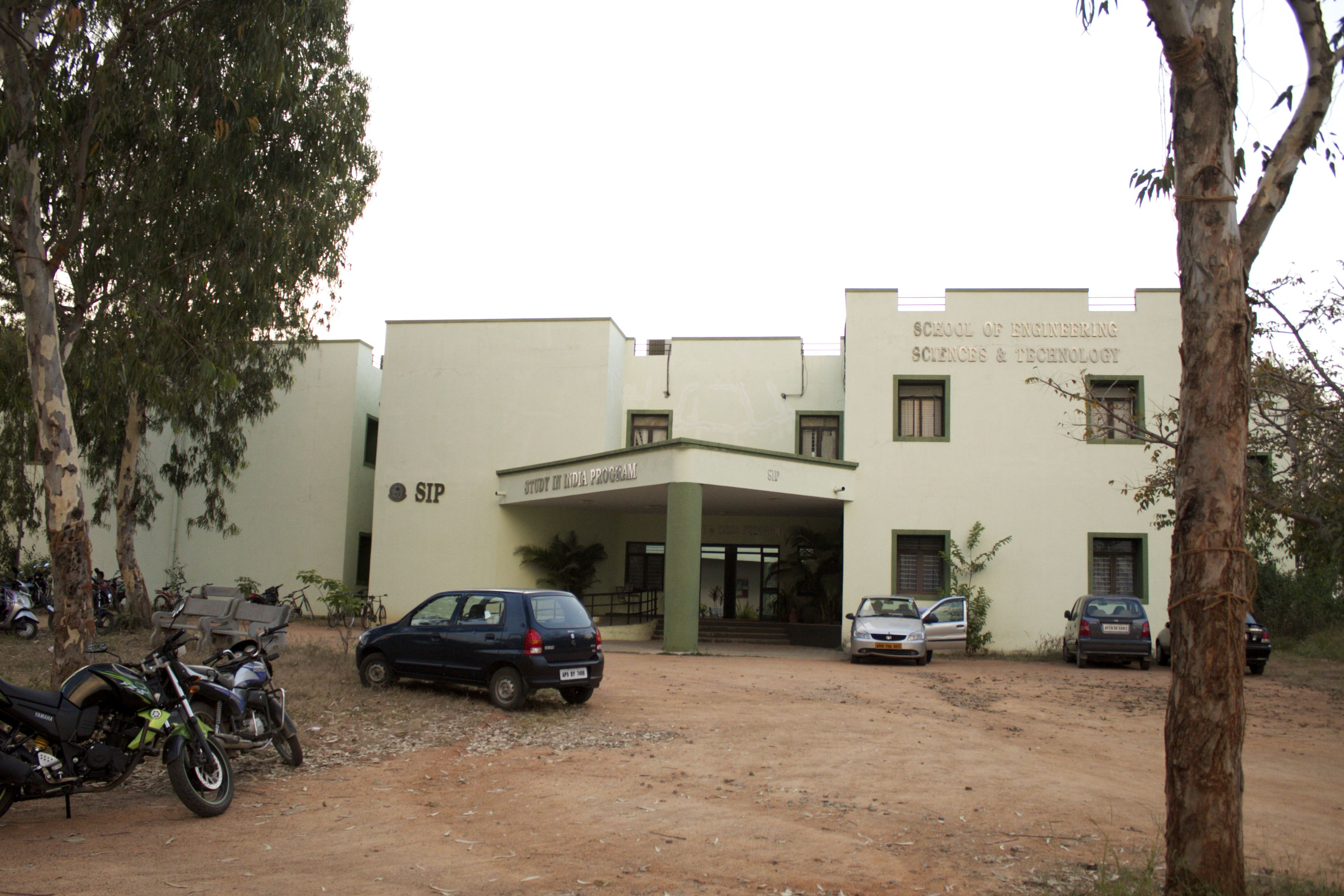
SIP Building, University of Hyderabad

The University of Hyderabad's Study in India Programme (SIP) for foreign students began as a small experimental summer initiative where students from the University of Pittsburgh took nine credits over nine weeks in the summer of 1998. Since then, SIP has grown in leaps and bounds and has gone from hosting eight students in its debut year to nearly 200 in the most recent academic year. The University Grants Commission (UGC), a governmental organisation in India tasked with determining and maintaining standards for university education, has hailed the Study in India Programme as a model initiative and has encouraged other universities in India to emulate the program's approach. SIP's strength is its flexibility and willing to innovate to meet the needs of universities and study abroad consortia. SIP has created specialised, tailor-made programs for partners such as Dartmouth College, Duke University and the Nordic Centre in India—a consortium of 15 Nordic universities. Students can apply on their own, through their home schools, or through study abroad consortia that are SIP partners.

In 2014 the SIP Programme has been selected for IIE Andrew Heiskell Award. Thirteen Campuses in the world have been recognised for their Outstanding International Initiatives. UoH is the only University from Asia to be recognised.

=== Centre for Distance and Virtual Learning ===
The University of Hyderabad started offering Post Graduate Diploma Programmes through distance mode since 1994. The target groups identified for these Programmes are (a) In service personnel looking forward to improve their skills and knowledge to enable to go up in the ladder in their own organisation or elsewhere and (b) Fresh graduate intending to improve their chances of employments on successful completion of these programmes.

== Schools, departments and centres ==
- School of Mathematics and Statistics
- School of Physics
- Centre for Earth and atmospheric ocean
- School of Chemistry
- School of Medical Sciences
  - Centre for Health Psychology
  - Centre for Neural and Cognitive Sciences
  - Department of Optometry
  - Department of Public Health
- School of Life Sciences
  - Department of Biochemistry
  - Department of Plant Sciences
  - Department of Animal Biology
  - Department of Biotechnology & Bioinformatics
  - Department of Systems & Computational Biology
- School of Computer and Information Sciences
- School of Social Sciences
  - Department of History
  - Department of Sociology
  - Department of Political Science
  - Department of Anthropology
  - Department of Education & Education Technology
- School of Humanities
  - Centre for Applied Linguistics and Translation Studies
  - Centre for Comparative Literature
  - Department of Philosophy
  - Department of English
  - Department of Hindi
  - Department of Telugu
  - Department of Urdu
  - Department of Sanskrit Studies
- School of Engineering Sciences and Technology
- School of Management Studies
- School of Economics
- Sarojini Naidu School of Arts & Communication
  - Department of Communication
  - Department of Dance
  - Department of Fine Arts
  - Department of Theatre Arts, See also: Theatre Outreach Unit
  - Department of Music

=== Academic Staff College ===
Established in 1987 as a major initiative in augmenting quality in Higher Education, the UGC promoted 66 Academic Staff Colleges. The Academic Staff College of University of Hyderabad is a constituent unit of the university offering orientation, refresher and need-based courses for Assistant Professors / Associate Professors working in Universities and Colleges.

It is an important academic wing of the university. Apart from the training programmes for teachers, the Academic Staff College conducts professional development programmes for principals and administrators. The faculty is also taking up the teaching assignments and research guidance in their respective departments. National Assessment and Accreditation Council (NAAC) Peer Review Committee from Ministry of Human Resource Development (MHRD) visited Academic Staff College during 19 – 21 January 2012 for peer reviewing of its activities and accredited this Academic Staff College, University of Hyderabad as ranked no. 4 in India.

== Research ==
The university is a public research university with high research activity in every department, awarding about 300 doctorates each year. The university receives research funding from UGC, CSIR, DST, DBT, FIST and other funding agencies. The university is known for high quality research output from faculty and students in the natural sciences, social sciences, and humanities.

=== National Institute of Animal Biotechnology ===
National Institute of Animal Biotechnology (NIAB) is an autonomous institute under the Department of Biotechnology, Ministry of Science and Technology, Government of India established in the campus of University of Hyderabad.

=== Institute of Life Sciences ===
The Institute of Life Sciences (ILS) also known as Dr. Reddy's Institute of Life Sciences is a research organisation founded through a public–private partnership initiative in the year 2004. The partners in the making of ILS are the Government of Telangana the University of Hyderabad and Dr. Reddy's Laboratories. Incorporated as a not-for-profit company, ILS has been accorded recognition as a Scientific & Industrial Research Organisation (SIRO) by the Ministry of Science & Technology.

=== CR Rao Advanced Institute of Mathematics, Statistics and Computer Science ===
The CR Rao Advanced Institute of Mathematics, Statistics and Computer Science (AIMSCS) has been set up with the objective of promoting research and advanced studies in mathematics, Statistics, Computer Science and allied subjects.

=== Association of Management Development Institutions in South Asia ===
The Association of Management Development Institutions in South Asia (AMDISA) is a SAARC-recognised body. The association was established on the initiative of leading management Schools in the SAARC region and is located on the University of Hyderabad Campus in Gachibowli. AMDISA promotes management education and Management Development in the SAARC region and publishes the South Asian Journal of Management. The mission of AMDISA is to network management schools and management development centres; to promote partnerships between the schools, leading managers, and policy administrators; and to enhance the quality and effectiveness of management education and development in South Asia.

== Student life ==
=== Hostels, canteens and recreational centres ===
There are 23 hostels for students to stay in (13 for men and 10 for women). The Tagore International House caters to international students. There are two shopping complexes: one on the North campus and one on the South Campus. Also, there are seven canteens: the Students Centre Canteen, Goodwill Canteen, SN school canteen, F canteen, School of Chemistry canteen, Admin canteen, and School of Life Sciences canteen.

There are four multipurpose auditoriums within the campus. The DST Auditorium is the largest, with a capacity of 700. It is used mainly for cultural events, seminars, public talks, and screening of documentaries and movies. The CV Raman Auditorium, with a capacity of 200, is located inside the science complex, and serves as a conference and seminar hall. The BR Ambedkar Auditorium is mainly used for cultural events, public talks, debates, and other events. There is another auditorium located inside the humanities block.

=== Bol Hyderabad Community Radio Station ===
Bol Hyderabad 90.4 FM is the University of Hyderabad's Campus Radio Station which began operations from 15 August 2011. The range of the radio broadcast is around 15-kilometre (9.3 mi) radius around the campus covering areas of Tolichowki, Gopanapally, HITEC City and Gachibowli areas of Hyderabad.

=== National Service Scheme Cell (NSS) ===
In connection with 'Gandhi Jayanti Week' Celebrations National Service Scheme(NSS) Cell, organises Peace March, Orientation Programmes, Tree plantation etc. during the first week of October every year.

=== Student Organizations ===
Major student organisations on the campus include the All India Students Association (AISA), Ambedkar Students' Association (ASA), Muslim Students Federation (MSF), Akhil Bharatiya Vidyarthi Parishad (ABVP), National Students' Union of India (NSUI), Students' Federation of India (SFI), Bahujan Students' Front (BSF), Dalit Students' Union (DSU), Fraternity Movement, Telangana Students' Association (TSA), and Other Backward Classes Federation (OBCF).

=== Students' Union ===
The Students' Union is elected annually, with elections being conducted by the students themselves, following the guidelines set by the Lyngdoh Committee. The Students' Union includes a president, vice-president, general secretary, joint secretary, sports secretary and cultural secretary. The elections are usually held during the month of September every year.

=== Sports events ===
The elected Students' Union conducts various sports and cultural events for the students over the academic year.

Nari's Knight Cup

The first of such event is the Nari's Cricket Knight Cup. The tournament is named in memory of an Ex-student Mr. Narayan Reddy (Nari) who met with an unfortunate death in the campus premises. Initially a few friends of Mr. Narayan Reddy started this 5-over a side tournament with 9 players per side. However, the Students' Union took over the responsibility of conducting the Knight Cup later. The tournament is conducted under floodlights at the Open-Air auditorium.

Senthil Balraj Cricket Night Cup

The Senthil Balraj Cricket Night cup was initiated in February, 2011 by the then Students' Union in memory of Senthil and Balraj. This cricket night cup is unique in the sense that it is open to only the registered students and employees of the university while the Nari's Knight Cup is open to Alumni's as well as the students of the university. However, the format of both the competitions remains the same.

Football Night Cup

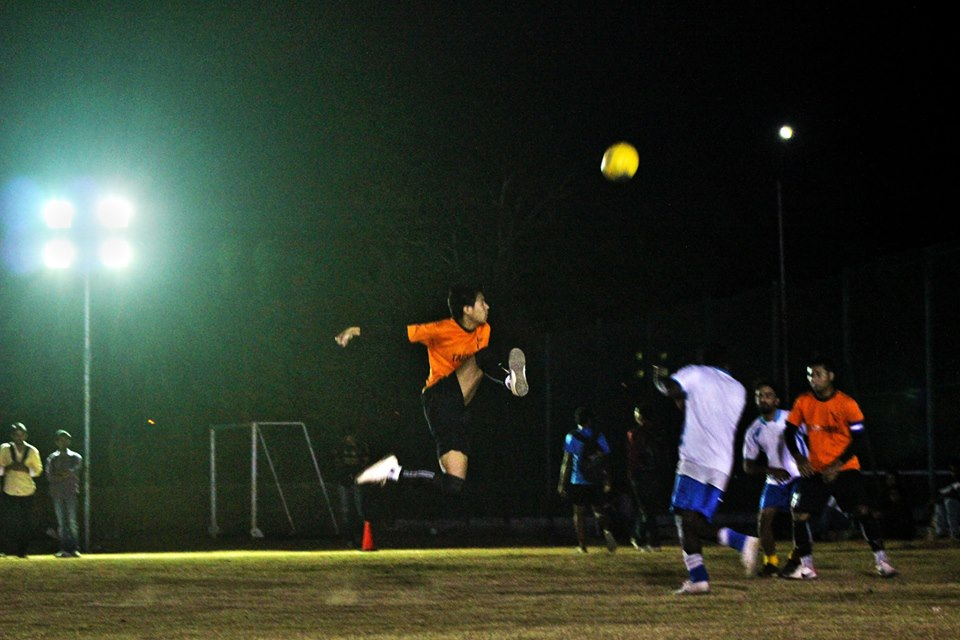
football

The Football Night cup is the third in the series of Night cups conducted by the Students' Union. The tournament is usually conducted in the last week of February every year. This is a 7-a-side tournament with a total match duration of 30 mins.

Basketball and Volleyball Night cup

The union also conducts basketball and volleyball night cups every year in the month of March.

=== Cultural festival ===
Sukoon (सुकून, meaning peace) is the annual cultural festival of the university organised by the Students' Union during the month of March where students from colleges all over Hyderabad participate. The 3-day event includes various literary and other recreational events.

=== Entrepreneurship Development Cell ===
The university has an ED Cell, located in the Management Block of the university, that has nurtured startups. Some of them include.

- Laundrette: A coin-operated washing machine service.

== Controversies ==
=== Transphobia and Casteism ===
On 24 February 2024, the clothes of a dalit trans woman and her roommate's clothes, who was also a trans woman, were found burnt near their hostel. Most probably an act of ragging caused due to transphobia and caste-based discrimination against dalits, this incident made the students to protest against the university for a transgender policy. A panel was made and a policy was drafted protecting transgender people which is expected to be introduced in the academic year of 2024-25.

=== Rohith Vemula ===
On 22 March 2016, police arrested 25 students and 2 faculty members who were reportedly protesting against the Vice Chancellor Appa Rao Podile's return to campus following the suicide of Rohith Vemula. All of them were granted bail on 28 March by the Metropolitan Magistrate at Miyapur court.

=== Kancha Gachibowli Land Auction Controversy (2025) ===
In 2025, the University of Hyderabad became the centre of a significant controversy involving the proposed auction of 160 hectares (400 acres) of land in the Kancha Gachibowli area, adjacent to its campus. The Telangana government's plan to auction this land for the development of an IT park sparked widespread protests from students, faculty, environmental activists, and political figures.

==== Background ====
The disputed 160-hectare (400-acre) tract was part of a larger 940-hectare (2,324-acre) parcel allocated to the University of Hyderabad in 1975 under the Six-Point Formula following the Telangana agitation. However, a 2022 High Court ruling determined that there was no legal documentation proving the transfer of this specific 160-hectare (400-acre) tract to the university. The Supreme Court upheld this decision, affirming the government's ownership of the land. Despite this, the university community contended that the land had been an integral part of the campus for decades and should remain under its stewardship.

==== Protests and Legal Actions ====
The government's decision to auction the land, with a base price of ₹10,000 crore, led to significant unrest. Students and faculty organized protests, including relay hunger strikes, demanding the cessation of land clearing activities and the removal of police presence on campus. Reports indicated that around 50 students were detained during these protests, with allegations of excessive force used by the police.

On 2 April 2025, tensions escalated at the University of Hyderabad as police resorted to a lathi charge against students and faculty protesting the Telangana government's decision to auction the land. The demonstrators, who had been staging an indefinite strike, were joined by the University of Hyderabad Teachers' Association in a march from Ambedkar Auditorium to the east campus. As they attempted to cross police barricades to reach the forested area being cleared, clashes ensued, resulting in approximately 20 injuries among the protesters.

Protesters accused the university administration of facilitating the land-clearing activities and criticized the police for using excessive force, including manhandling and detaining students. Videos of the incident circulated widely on social media, prompting public outcry. While police officials denied the use of force, stating that students were merely prevented from taking out the rally, eyewitness accounts and footage suggest otherwise.

A Joint Action Committee (JAC) comprising students, faculty, and civil society members was formed to oppose the auction. The JAC filed a Public Interest Litigation (PIL) in the Telangana High Court, seeking to halt the auction and protect the ecological integrity of the land.

==== Environmental and Cultural Concerns ====
Opponents of the auction argued that the land was ecologically sensitive, housing over 455 species of flora and fauna, including peacock, deer and unique rock formations. Activists filed petitions to have the area declared a national park under the Wildlife (Protection) Act, seeking its designation as a 'deemed forest' to prevent development.

The controversy also drew attention to the historical significance of the land, which had been part of the university's campus since its inception. Critics accused the government of prioritizing commercial interests over educational and environmental considerations.

==== Government Response and Current Status ====
In response to the protests and legal challenges, the Supreme Court took suo motu cognizance of the issue and appointed a Central Empowered Committee (CEC) to investigate the matter. The CEC held discussions with students, university officials, and politicians to assess the situation.

Following the CEC's involvement and mounting public pressure, the Telangana government reportedly decided to scrap the auction plan. Instead, it announced intentions to convert the disputed land, along with the surrounding area, into one of the world's largest eco-parks.

As of April 2025, the legal battle over the land's future continues, with the Telangana High Court scheduled to hear the case. The university community remains vigilant, advocating for the preservation of the land's ecological and educational value.

== Chancellors ==
SL No.	Name	Term start	Term end
1.	B D Jatti	1974	1979
2.	G Parthasarathy	1982	1986
3.	M Hidayatullah	1986	1991
4.	J R D Tata	1991	1993
5.	Abid Hussain	1994	1997
6.	Romila Thapar	1997	2000
7.	P. N. Bhagwati	2001	2005
8.	M N Venkatachaliah	2005	2008
9.	R. Chidambaram	2008	2012
10.	C. H. Hanumantha Rao	2012	2014
12.	C. Rangarajan	2015	2018
13.	L. Narasimha Reddy	2018	Incumbent

== Vice-Chancellors ==
- Gurbaksh Singh, 1974–1979
- B. S. Ramakrishna, 1980–1986
- Bhadriraju Krishnamurti, 1986–1993
- Goverdhan Mehta, 1993–1998
- Palle Rama Rao, 1999–2002
- Kota Harinarayana, 2002–2005
- Seyed E. Hasnain, 2005–2011
- Ramakrishna Ramaswamy, 2011 – 29 January 2015
- E. Haribabu, 29 January 2015 – 31 May 2015
- R. P. Sharma, 1 June 2015 – 22 September 2015
- Appa Rao Podile, 23 September 2015 – 7 June 2021
- Arun Agarwal, 8 June 2021 - 25 July 2021
- B. J. Rao, 26 July 2021 – 12 March 2026
- J. Anuradha (I/C), 13 March 2026 – present

== Notable Alumni and Faculty ==
- Syed Akbaruddin, former permanent representative of India at the United Nations
- Dipankar Chatterji, recipient of Padma Shri and Shanti Swarup Bhatnagar Prize
- Ganesh Puthur, Writer, Historian, Sahitya Akademi Yuva Puraskar Winner
- Shanta Sinha, Ramon Magsaysay Award winner
- Rahul Banerjee (chemist), Shanti Swarup Bhatnagar laureate
- U. K. Anandavardhanan, recipient of Shanti Swarup Bhatnagar Prize
- Goverdhan Mehta, FRS
- G. Naresh Patwari, chemist and Shanti Swarup Bhatnagar laureate
- D. Srinivasa Reddy
- Girish Agarwal, FRS
- Dhevalapally B. Ramachary, professor of chemistry at University of Hyderabad
- D Sridhar Babu, Former Minister, Govt of Andhra Pradesh
- G. Narahari Sastry, Bhatnagar Prize winner
- Adusumilli Srikrishna
- Mallu Bhatti Vikramarka
- Manoj Abraham IPS, ADGP Kerala Police
- Geeta Kashyap Vemuganti, Ophthalmologist, N-Bios laureate
- Rohith Vemula, Dalit activist
- Hoshang Merchant, poet and former English professor at University of Hyderabad
- Ganesh Bagler, a pioneer of computational gastronomy
- Priyadarshi Pulikonda, Telugu Actor
- Mohammed Baig Ehsas, Urdu writer
- Roji M. John, Minister for Higher Education, Government of Kerala
- Gautam R. Desiraju, chemist and former president of International Union of Crystallography and currently emeritus Professor at Indian Institute of Science

== See also ==
- Education in India
- Distance Education Council
- University Grants Commission (India)
- Bhartendu Academy of Dramatic Arts
