= Citizenship Amendment Act protests =

2019–2020 protests in India

- CAA and NRC protests
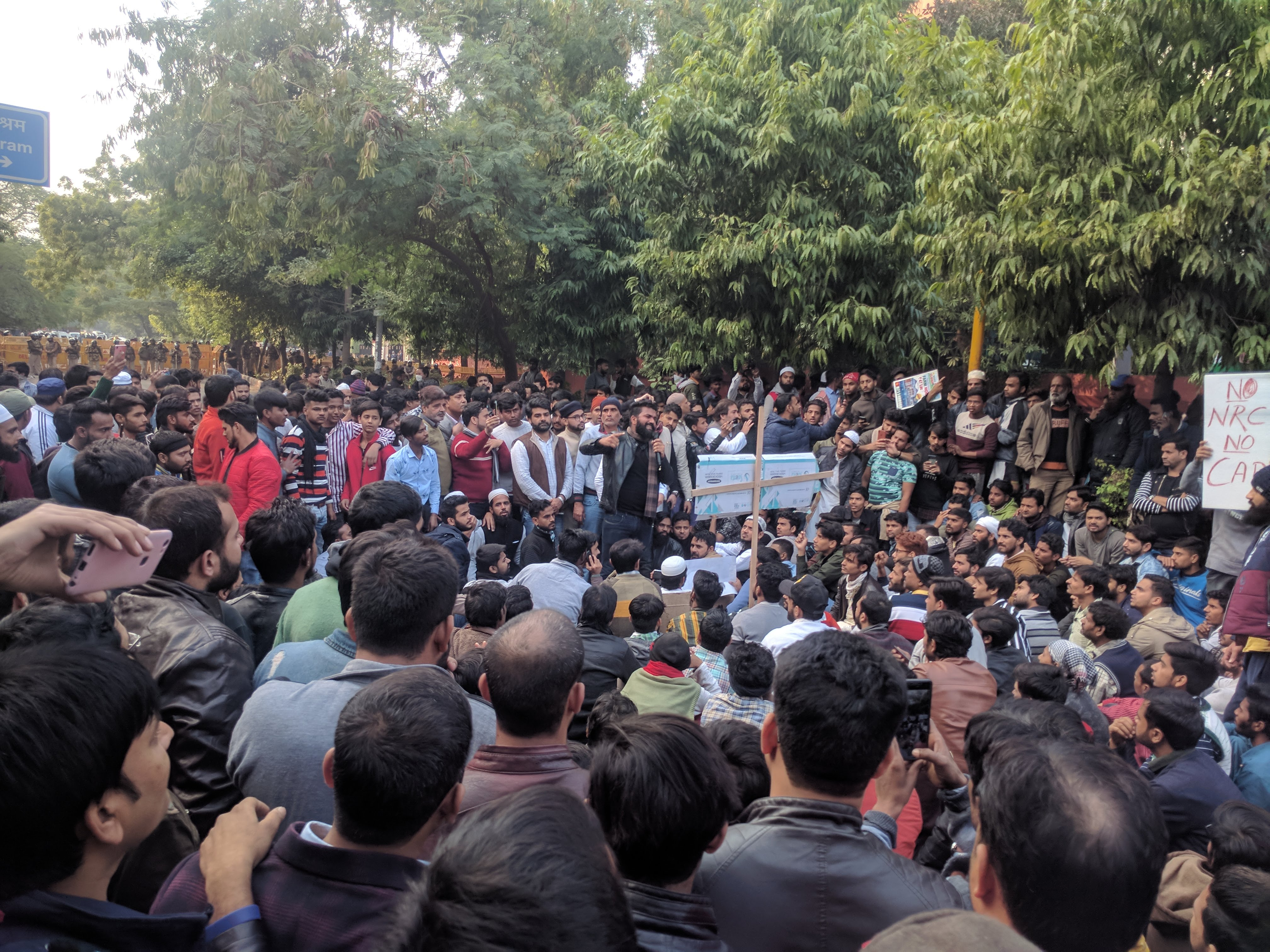
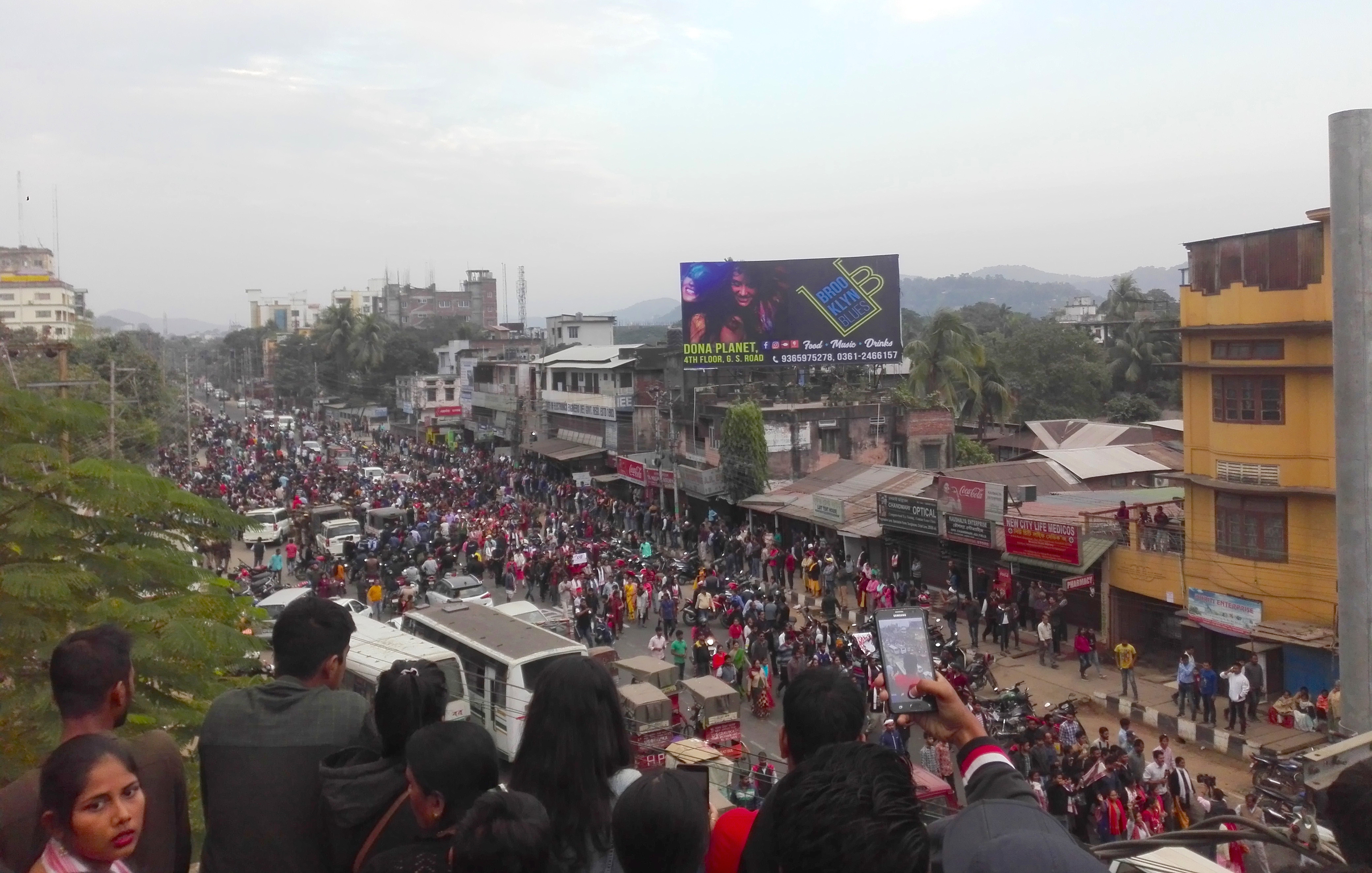
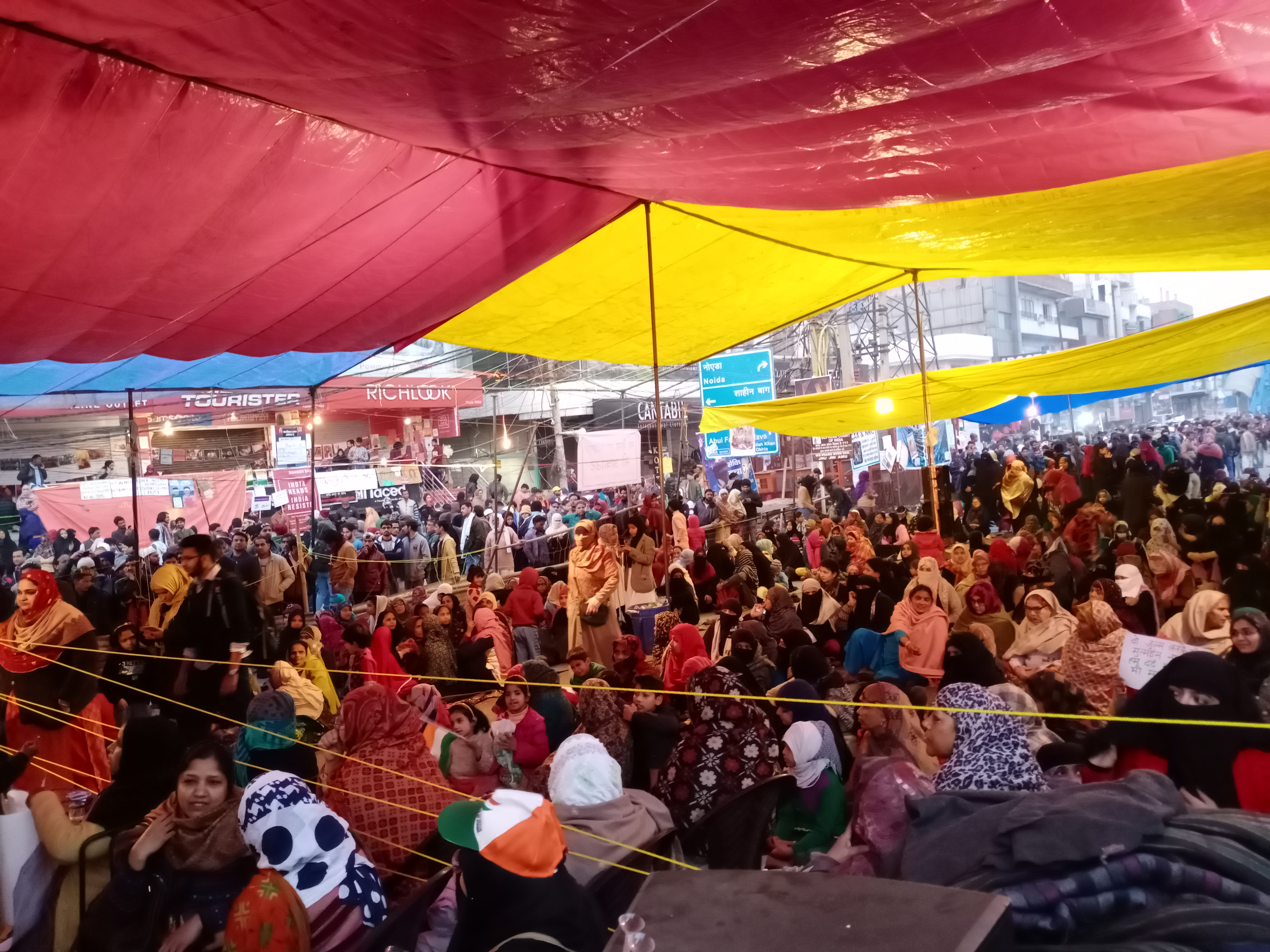
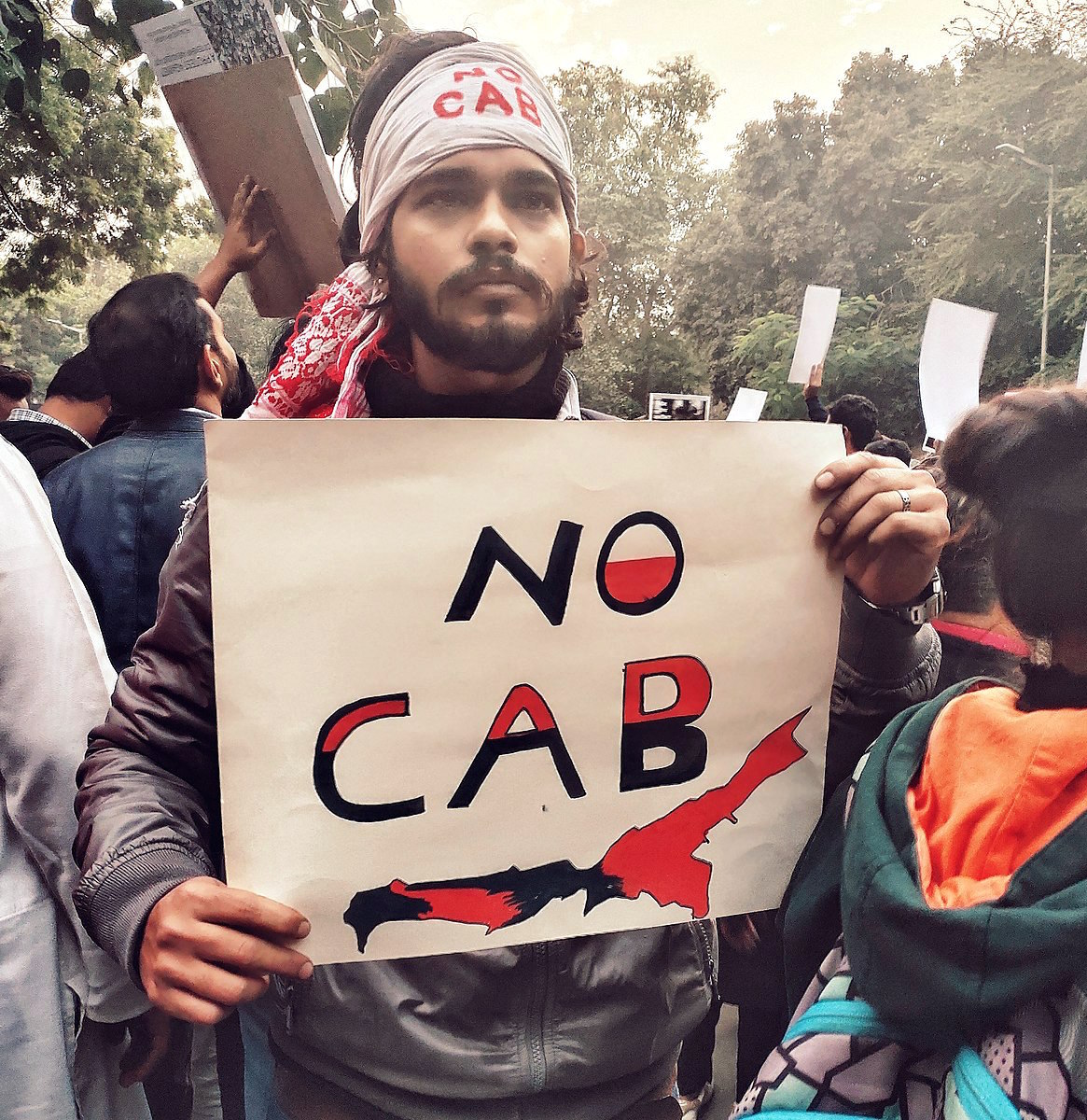
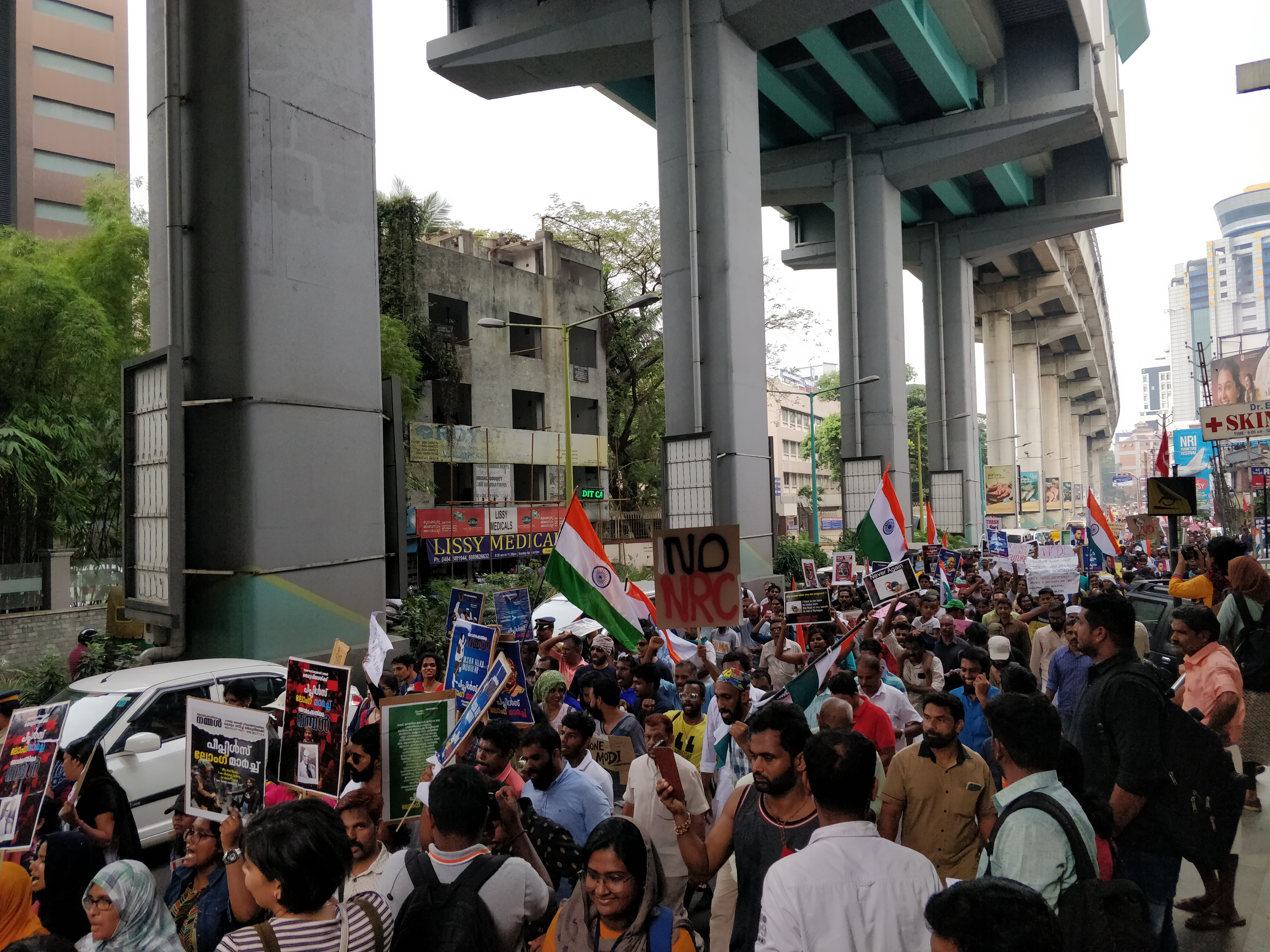
- (counterclockwise from top) Jamia Milia Islamia students protesting, protests in Guwahati, Meghalaya, Kerala and Shaheen Bagh (Delhi), protesters stopping traffic, Aisa and CPIML(L) protest in Kolkata.
- Date: 4 December 2019 – March 2020
- Location: India
- Caused by: Introduction of Citizenship (Amendment) Act, 2019; Anticipation of implementation of the National Register of Citizens of India; Police brutality against protesters; Violent crackdown against protesters
- Goals: Repeal of the Citizenship (Amendment) Act, 2019; Halt the implementation of the National Register of Citizens of India; Independent Judicial probe into various Police departments for police brutality; Resignation of CM Yogi Adityanath; Release of various political prisoners
- Methods: Protesters: Civil disobedience, demonstrations, Dharna, Gherao, hunger strikes, Satyagraha, Hartal, vandalism, arson, stone pelting, hashtag activism, general strike (Bandh); Government and supporters: Riot police, lathi charge, Mass arrest, Internet shutdown, curfew, transport restrictions, water cannon, imposing ban on assembly (Section 144)
- Status: Stopped. It became indispensable to stop due to the lockdown being imposed in the country to curb the COVID-19 pandemic. Previously: Section 144, curfew, Internet shutdown imposed in various parts of the country.; Indian Army deployed in Assam.; Paramilitary forces deployed in various parts of the country.
- Result: CAB implemented and now in force

Parties
Main parties: Bharatiya Janata Party; Rashtriya Swayamsevak Sangh; Akhil Bhartiya Vidyarthi Parishad; Vishva Hindu Parishad; Bajrang Dal; Others	Multiple groups of citizens throughout India; Student organisations: Ambedkar Students Association; Birsa Ambedkar Phule Students' Association; Kerala State Muslim Students Federation; Fraternity Movement; Muslim Students Federation; All India Students Federation; All Assam Students’ Union; Asom Jatiyatabadi Yuba Chatra Parishad; Chhatra Bharati; Pinjra Tod; Students For Society; Students Federation of India; Democratic Youth Federation of India; National Students' Union of India; All India Students Association; All India Democratic Students Organisation; Krantikari Yuva Sangathan; All India Catholic University Federation; All Arunachal Pradesh Students' U'''nion; North East Students' Organisation; Jawaharlal Nehru University Students' Union; Aligarh Muslim University Students Union; Students Islamic Organisation of India; Campus Front of India; Mizo Zirlai Pawl; Twipra Students Federation; All India Sikh Students Federation; All Idu Mishmi Students Union; All Tai Ahom Students Union; Jamia Coordination Committee; Other organisations: Bhim Army; Indian Youth Congress; Jamaat-e-Islami Hind; Popular Front of India; South East Asia Cultural Organisation; Muslim Youth League; All India Youth Federation; Revolutionary Youth Association; People's Union for Civil Liberties; Association of Democratic Rights; National Confederation of Human Rights Organisations; Krishak Mukti Sangram Samiti; All India Central Council of Trade Unions; Khalsa Aid; Khudai Khidmatgar India; Assam Sahitya Sabha; Srimanta Sankaradeva Sangha; Welfare Party of India; LGBT groups; Supported by: Vanchit Bahujan Aghadi; Indian National Congress; Aam Aadmi Party; All India Majlis-e-Ittehadul Muslimeen; All India Trinamool Congress; Samajwadi Party; Indian Union Muslim League; Dravida Munnetra Kazhagam; Rashtriya Lok Dal; Communist Party of India; Communist Party of India (Marxist); Communist Party of India (Marxist-Leninist) Liberation; Nationalist Congress Party; Rashtriya Janata Dal; Janata Dal (Secular); Makkal Needhi Maiam; Swaraj India

Lead figures
Narendra Modi; Amit Shah; Nitin Gadkari; Jagat Prakash Nadda; Himanta Biswa Sarma; Sarbananda Sonowal; Yogi Adityanath; B. S. Yediyurappa	Mamta Banerjee; Pinarayi Vijayan; Kanhaiya Kumar; Kannan Gopinathan; Priyanka Gandhi; Kavita Krishnan; Sitaram Yechury; Asaduddin Owaisi; Yogendra Yadav; Akhil Gogoi (arrested); Chandrashekhar Azad (arrested); D. Raja; Binoy Viswam; Rahul Gandhi; Tushar Gandhi; Umar Khalid; Sharjeel Imam; Feroze Mithiborwala; Safoora Zargar (arrested); Aysha Renna; Asif Iqbal Tanha (arrested); Ishrath Jahan (arrested); Fahad Ahmad; (scholars, writers, artists): Ramachandra Guha; Arundhati Roy; Harsh Mander; Javed Akhtar; Varun Grover; Zubeen Garg; Swara Bhaskar; Zeeshan Ayyub; Anurag Kashyap; Jay Mala

Casualties
- Deaths: 65+
- Injuries: 175 (reported as of 16 December)
- Arrested: 3,000+ (reported as of 17 December)

Protests occurred after the Citizenship Amendment Act (CAA) was enacted by the Government of India on 12 December 2019. The move sparked widespread national and overseas ongoing protests against the act and its associated proposals of the National Register of Citizens (NRC). The protests first began in Assam and spread swiftly to other states such as Delhi, Meghalaya, Arunachal Pradesh, and Tripura on 4 December 2019. Protests broke out rapidly across the country, although the concerns of the protesters in various regions varied.

The CAA amends the Indian citizenship act to provide accelerated pathway for citizenship for asylum seeking migrants who are Hindu, Sikh, Jain, Parsi, Buddhist, and Christian from Afghanistan, Bangladesh and Pakistan, and who entered India before 2014, following the religious persecutions. The bill reduced the time taken for naturalization for this category from twelve years to six years. The bill does not mention Muslims and other communities who fled from the same or other neighbouring countries. Refugees from Sri Lankan Tamils in India, Rohingyas from Myanmar, and Tibetan refugees are also not mentioned in the bill. The proposed National Register of Citizens (NRC) will be an official record of all legal citizens of India. Individuals would need to provide a prescribed set of documents before a specified cutoff date to be included in it.

The amendment has been widely criticised as discriminating on the basis of religion, particularity for excluding Muslims. Protestors against the amendment demand that it be scrapped and that the nationwide NRC not be implemented. The bill has raised concerns among the Indian Muslim community. They are also concerned that all citizens will be affected by the bureaucratic exercise of the NRC where they will have to prove their citizenship for inclusion in the registry. The protesters have raised voices against authoritarianism and the police crackdown in universities to suppress protests.

Protesters in Assam and other northeastern states do not want Indian citizenship to be granted to any refugee or immigrant, regardless of their religion, as they fear it would alter the region's demographic balance, resulting in a loss of their political rights, culture, and land. They are also concerned that it will motivate further migration from Bangladesh that could violate the Assam Accord which was a prior agreement reached with the central government on migrants and refugees.

The protests started in Assam on 4 December 2019, after the bill was introduced in parliament. Later on, protests erupted in Northeast India, and subsequently spread to the major cities of India. On 15 December, major protests took place near Jamia Millia Islamia in New Delhi and Aligarh Muslim University. As the protests broke out, mobs burnt and destroyed public as well as private properties and several railway stations were vandalised. Police forcibly entered the campus of Jamia, used batons and tear gas on the students, and more than 200 students were injured while around 100 were detained overnight in the police station. The police action was widely criticised and resulted students across the country protesting in solidarity.

The protests resulted in thousands of arrests and 27 deaths as of 27 December 2019. Two 17-year-old minors were among those reported to have been killed due to police firing during a live ammunition on protesters in Assam. On 19 December, the police issued a complete ban on protests in several parts of India. As a result of defying the ban, thousands of protesters were detained.

== Background ==
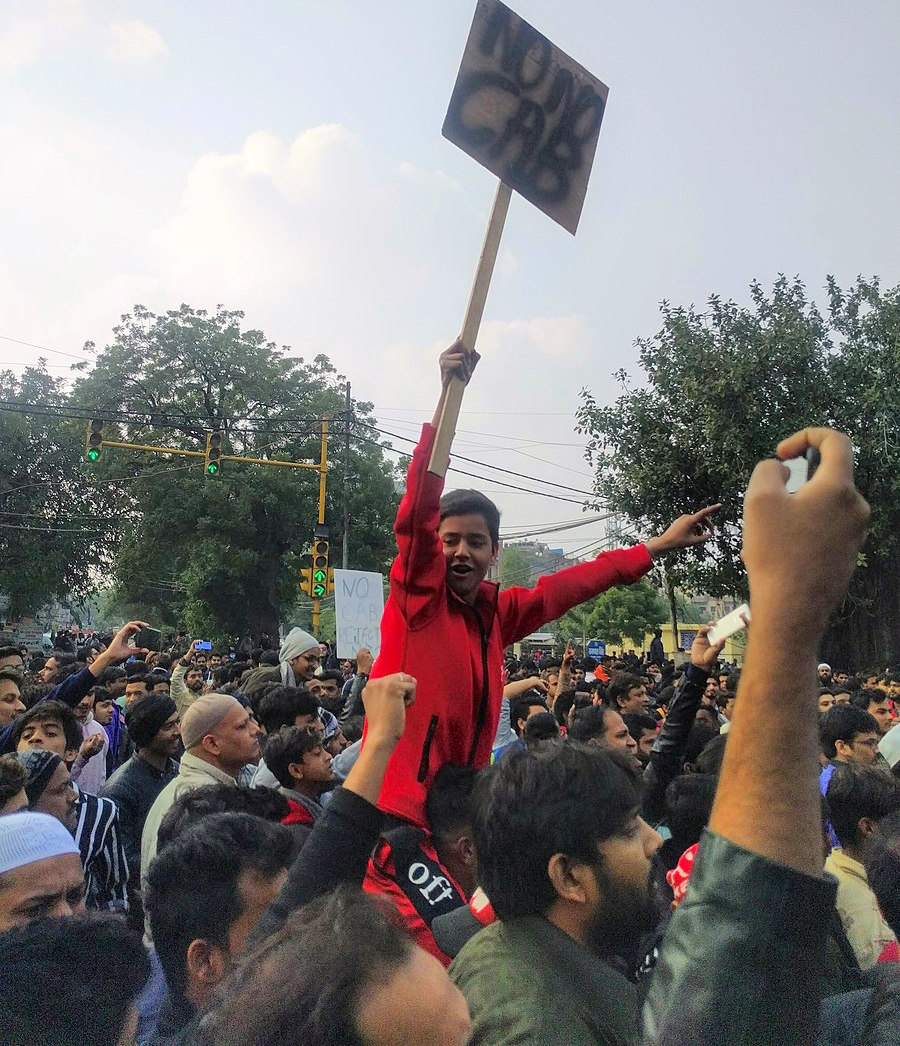
A child taking part in an anti-CAB NRC protest with Jamia Millia Islamia students and locals.

=== Citizenship (Amendment) Act, 2019 ===
The Citizenship (Amendment) Bill, 2019 (CAB) was introduced by the Home Minister, Amit Shah on the floor of the Parliament of India on 9 December 2019 in response to the exclusion of 1.9 million people, predominantly Hindus and Muslims in the National Register of Citizens for Assam. The Citizenship (Amendment) Act, 2019 (CAA) was passed by the Parliament of India on 11 December. It amends the Citizenship Act of 1955 to grant a swifter path to Indian citizenship under the assumption of religious persecution to any individual belonging to the specific minorities of Hindus, Sikhs, Buddhists, Jains, Parsis and Christians from Afghanistan, Bangladesh and Pakistan, who entered India on or before 31 December 2014. The Act also seeks to relax the requirement of residence in India for citizenship by naturalisation from 11 years to 5 years for migrants covered under the Act.

However, the Act does not mention Muslims and does not offer the same eligibility benefits to Muslim immigrants or immigrants belonging to other religions from those countries. The Act also does not mention any benefits for various other refugees which form the bulk of the refugees living in India, such as Sri Lankan Tamil refugees who faced persecution during the Sri Lankan Civil War, Rohingya refugees who were victims of the Rohingya genocide, Nepali refugees who faced ethnic cleansing in Bhutan, and Tibetan Buddhist refugees who faced persecution in China. According to the Intelligence Bureau, the immediate beneficiaries of the new law will be 25,447 Hindus, 5,807 Sikhs, 55 Christians, 2 Buddhists and 2 Parsis.

=== Response ===
The passage of the Act sparked massive protests in India. Protesters in Assam and other northeastern states oppose the grant of Indian citizenship to any refugee or immigrant, regardless of their religion, because they fear it would alter the region's demographic balance. They have campaigned since the 1970s against all refugees, and they fear that the new law will cause a loss of their political rights, culture and land. They are also concerned that it will trigger more migration from Bangladesh as well as violate the Assam Accord, which was a prior agreement reached with the central government on migrants and refugees. After the act was passed, protests in the northeastern region turned violent. Authorities have arrested over 3000 protesters as of 17 December 2019, and some news outlets have described these protests as riots. Protesters say that the Act violates Clause 5 and Clause 6 of the 1985 Assam Accord.

Critics have stated that the amendment Act is unconstitutional. The major opposition political parties state that it violates Constitution's Article 14, one that guarantees equality to all. They allege that the new law seeks to make Muslims second-class citizens of India, while preferentially treating non-Muslims in India.

Critics of the Act have also stated that due to the National Register of Citizens (NRC), Muslims could be made stateless, while the Citizenship Amendment Act would be able to shield people with Hindu, Sikh, Buddhist, Jain, Parsi or Christian identity as a means of providing them with Indian citizenship even if they fail to prove that they were citizens of India under the stringent requirements of the NRC. Some critics allege that it is a deliberate attempt at disenfranchising and segregating Muslims in line with the ethnonationalist Hindutva ideology of the ruling Bharatiya Janata Party (BJP).

Tavleen Singh described the Act as India's first Nuremberg Law.

The Act was criticised by various NGOs, students bodies, and liberal, progressive, and socialist organisations across the country, with the Indian National Congress and other major political parties announcing their staunch opposition. Protests led by these groups are concerned that the new law discriminates against Muslims, and believe that Indian citizenship should also be granted to Muslim refugees and immigrants. The states of Rajasthan, West Bengal, Kerala, Maharashtra, Madhya Pradesh, Jharkhand and Chhattisgarh – all ruled by political parties that had poor relations with the BJP in the year 2020 – announced that they would not implement either the National Register of Citizens (NRC) or the Citizenship Amendment Act. The states of Bihar, Andhra Pradesh and Odisha have however refused to only implement the NRC, while the state of Punjab and the union territories of Delhi and Puducherry have refused to implement the Act while only expressing disapproval of the NRC.

The states of West Bengal and Kerala have also put a hold on all activities relating to the preparation and update of the National Population Register which is necessary for the Census as well as the implementation of the National Register of Citizens. Although some of the states have opposed the Act, the Union Home Ministry clarified that states lack the legal power to stop the implementation of CAA. The Ministry stated that "The new legislation has been enacted under the Union List of the 7th Schedule of the Constitution. The states have no power to reject it." The Indian Union Muslim League and various other bodies have also petitioned the Supreme Court of India to strike down the Act as illegal and unconstitutional.

== Chronology ==
=== 2019 ===
- 4 December

- The Citizenship (Amendment) Bill, 2019 was cleared by the Union Cabinet for introduction in the parliament.
- After the bill was cleared, violent protests erupted in Assam, especially in Guwahati, and other areas in the state.
- In Dispur, several thousands of protesters broke down police barricades to protest in front of the Assam Legislative Assembly building.
- Demonstrations were held in Agartala. Six people died and fifty people were injured in the protests against the Act.

- 9 December

- The bill was introduced in the Lok Sabha by the Minister of Home Affairs, Amit Shah.

- 10 December

- The bill was passed with 311 members voting in favour and 80 against.

- 11 December

- The bill was subsequently passed by the Rajya Sabha with 125 votes in favour and 105 votes against it. Those parties that had voted in favour include BJP allies such as the Janata Dal (United) and the AIADMK and non-aligned parties such as the Biju Janata Dal.

- 12 December

- After receiving assent from the President of India, the bill assumed the status of an act. The act would come into force on 10 January, chosen by the Government of India, and would be notified as such.
- Dipanjal Das and Sam Stafford were killed in police firing during a protest in Guwahati.
- Akhil Gogoi was taken in preventive custody.

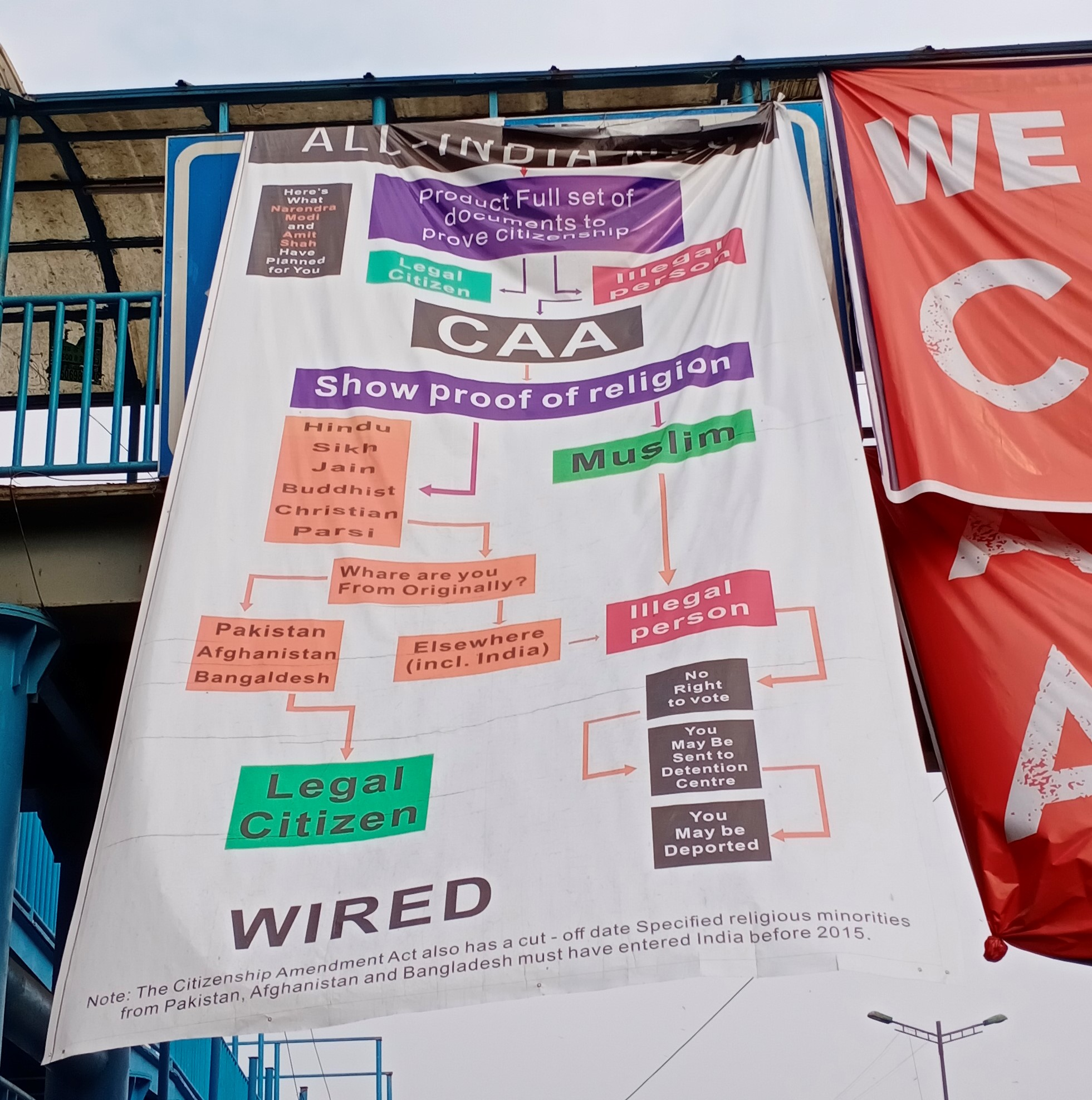
A poster at Shaheen Bagh protests New Delhi

- 13 December

- UK, US, France, Israel and Canada issued travel warnings for their citizens visiting India's north-east region, where the protests were mainly taking place, asking them to "exercise caution".
- The Chief Ministers of the Indian states of West Bengal, Punjab, Kerala, Madhya Pradesh and Chhattisgarh had stated that they would not implement the act.

- 14 December

- Ishwar Nayak was killed in police firing at a protest in Assam.
- Thousands of people protested against the law at the Jantar Mantar in New Delhi.

- 15 December

- In Assam, Abdul Alim, a protester, died due to police firing in a protest the previous day.
- In Jamia Nagar, Delhi, three Delhi Transport Corporation buses were torched as protests took a violent turn.
- A group of artists in Guwahati staged a concert in protest against the Citizenship Amendment Act 2019.
- Police forcefully entered the campus of Jamia Milia Islamia university and detained students. According to video footage, the police used batons and tear gas on the students. More than two hundred students were injured and around a hundred were detained. The police action was widely criticised, and resulted in protests across the country and abroad. There were also allegations that the police attacked students who were not part of the protests.
- Protests were held outside the campus of the Aligarh Muslim University. In the evening, police officers forcefully entered the campus and attacked students. At least 80 students were injured in the attacks.
- In West Bengal, violent protests occurred and five trains were set on fire by protesters in Lalgola and Krishnapur railway stations in Murshidabad district.

- 16 December

- In Lucknow, police prevented around 300 students of Nadwa University from staging a peaceful protest outside the campus; clashes ensued later. Around 15 to 20 students were injured and around 30 students were charged by the police for attempt to murder and violence.
- Priyanka Gandhi led a silent protest at the India Gate along with about three hundred Indian National Congress workers to show solidarity with the students of Jamia Milia Islamia after the previous day's incidents.
- A Satyagraha was organised by the All Assam Students' Union across Assam, which would continue till 18 December.
- In West Bengal thousands of people joined a demonstration led by Chief Minister Mamata Banerjee and her ruling Trinamool Congress party.
- Prime Minister Narendra Modi appealed for calm on Twitter and clarified that CAA was for immigrants.

- 17 December

- Violent clashes occurred in Delhi's Seelampur area. Police retaliated with tear gas and batons against the stone throwing protesters. Several protesters and officers were injured. A police station was set on fire and buses were vandalised in the area.
- A dawn-to-dusk hartal (shutdown) was observed in Kerala by the Welfare Party of India, Bahujan Samaj Party, Social Democratic Party of India and 30 other organisations against the Citizenship Amendment Act and the police violence against students at various universities across the country, in relation to anti-CAA protests.

- 18 December

- The Supreme Court of India heard 60 petitions challenging the Act and declined to stay implementation of CAA. 22 January 2020 was set as the next date of hearing on the constitutional validity of the act.
- A statement "condemning the recent police action and brutalisation of students at Jamia Millia University and Aligarh Muslim University" was signed by signatories from more than 1,100 academic institutions across the world.

- 19 December

- 3 protesters (2 in Mangalore and 1 in Lucknow) were killed in police firing.
- Various administrative authorities imposed bans against public gatherings, especially in BJP ruled states such as Karnataka, Uttar Pradesh and parts of Delhi, where the police comes under the BJP-ruled central government. Access to mobile-based internet was shut down in certain places in Delhi and Bangalore.
- Internet was suspended in certain regions of Uttar Pradesh including the state capital, Lucknow where data and text services were restricted till noon of 21 December 2019. Internet services were also suspended in Sambhal, Aligarh, Mau, Ghaziabad, and Azamgarh districts, as well as Dakshina Kannada district in Karnataka.
- Protest meetings were held defying bans in Delhi's Red Fort and Bengaluru. Tens of thousands of people protested in Hyderabad, Patna, Chandigarh, Mumbai and other cities. Calls were made on social media platforms asking people to turn up and protest peacefully.
- In Delhi, politicians Yogendra Yadav and Sitaram Yechury along with around 1,200 protesters were detained by the police.
- In Delhi, at least 700 flights were delayed and more than 20 cancelled due to traffic jams caused by police closing roads to stop protests.
- In Bengaluru, historian Ramchandra Guha along with several other professors were detained by the police. According to the police, around 200 protesters had been detained in Bengaluru.
- Curfew was imposed in Mangaluru until 20 December, after violent clashes and the death of 2 people due to police firing. The police later allegedly forced its way into the hospital where the 2 victims were brought.
- UNICEF issued a statement asking the government to respect children's right of freedom of expression, peaceful assembly and protest as per the Convention on the Rights of the Child.
- In Ahmedabad, during a violent clash in the Shah-e-Alam's Roza area police used tear gas to defend themselves and counter stone pelting while trying to disperse a crowd of around 2000 protesters.
- 90 protesters including 50 students of the Hyderabad university were detained by Hyderabad police.
- A crowd consisting of thousands of protesters gathered at Moulali in central Kolkata to peacefully protest against CAA and NRC.
- Protests involving 20,000 protesters concluded peacefully at the August Kranti Maidan at Mumbai.

- 20 December

- 6 protesters (one each in Meerut, Sambhal, Kanpur and Firozabad and 2 in Bijnor) were killed in separate police firing incidents in UP.
- Bhim Army Chief Chandrashekhar Azad conducted a protest march at the Jama Masjid in Delhi.

- 21 December

- Chandrashekhar Azad was arrested along with 27 people and three FIRs were registered for certain violent incidents on 20 December at Delhi Gate and Seemapuri.
- 1100 academics and academia staff from around the world issued a joint statement supporting the act.
- Peaceful protests were conducted in West Bengal, Assam, Meghalaya, Maharashtra and Delhi. An all-woman protest was organised across Assam.
- A spontaneous protest march, approximately 1.5 km long occurred in Kolkata.
- Clashes were reported during protests near Chennai Central railway station.
- 1 protester dies and several are injured in clashes at multiple locations in Uttar Pradesh. Access to the internet is still restricted at many places.
- In Patna and other towns of Bihar, supporters of the Rashtriya Janata Dal (RJD) protested at bus and train stations and blocked roads.
- An 18-year-old protester, Amir Hanzla was beaten to death by Hindu extremists for his role in the protests.

- 22 December

- The Chief Minister of Rajasthan, Ashok Gehlot held a protest march termed the "Samvidhan Bachao Rally" which was attended by around 300,000 people.
- The Karnataka government announced an ex-gratia compensation of ₹10 lakh (US$11,000) each to the families of the two men killed in violent protests against the Citizenship Amendment Act in Mangaluru on 19 December. However, the compensation was withheld on 26 December, impending an enquiry on the killed men.
- The Uttar Pradesh government created a panel to assess the damage to the property and to recover the losses by seizing the property of the alleged protesters.

- 23 December

- Protests involving 80,000 protesters concluded peacefully in Bangalore.
- Dibrugarh police arrested 55 people for involvement in acts of violence in the district during protests against the Amendment.
- Unidentified people assaulted three migrant labourers from West Bengal for allegedly taking part in anti-CAA protests.
- An FIR was registered against AAP MLA Amanatullah Khan over charges of "sharing an objectionable post" on the social media against the act.
- 31 people were arrested for violence during an anti-CAA protest in Rampur, Uttar Pradesh.

- 24 December

- Despite widespread ongoing protests, the central government approved the updation of the National Population Register (NPR) and allocated ₹3,941.35 crore (US$420 million) for it.
- A German exchange student at IIT Madras was deported by the Indian authorities for participating in the CAA protests.
- Reports of police vandalising homes, shops and cars and accusing and arresting protesters of taking part in vandalism emerged from various parts of the state of Uttar Pradesh.
- 1,000-1,200 protesters were booked for organising a candle march in Aligarh Muslim University for violating Section 144.

- 26 December

- In Sambhal, UP, the government sent notices to 26 people for their alleged involvement in damaging properties during protests and asked them to explain their position or pay for the loss due to damage of property. The losses to the property were assessed to be ₹11.66 lakh (US$12,000).

- 27 December

- 357 people including 75 women protesting against CAA and police atrocities were detained by the Delhi police near the UP Bhavan.

- 28 December

- The Indian National Congress, on its foundation day, undertook a flag march in Mumbai and coined the slogan "Save Bharat-Save Constitution". Similar marches were held in many parts of the country.
- In Meerut, U.P. government demanded ₹25,000 (US$270) each from more than 140 people, a total of ₹40 lakh (US$43,000) as penalty for damages caused during protests on 20 December.

- 29 December

- The Shaheen Bagh protests, which started on 15 December and were participated in mainly by house wives and old women with their children, gathered mainstream media attention on 29 December. Despite Delhi experiencing the second coldest night in the last 100 years, the women protesters sat on an indefinite protest at Shaheen Bagh, .

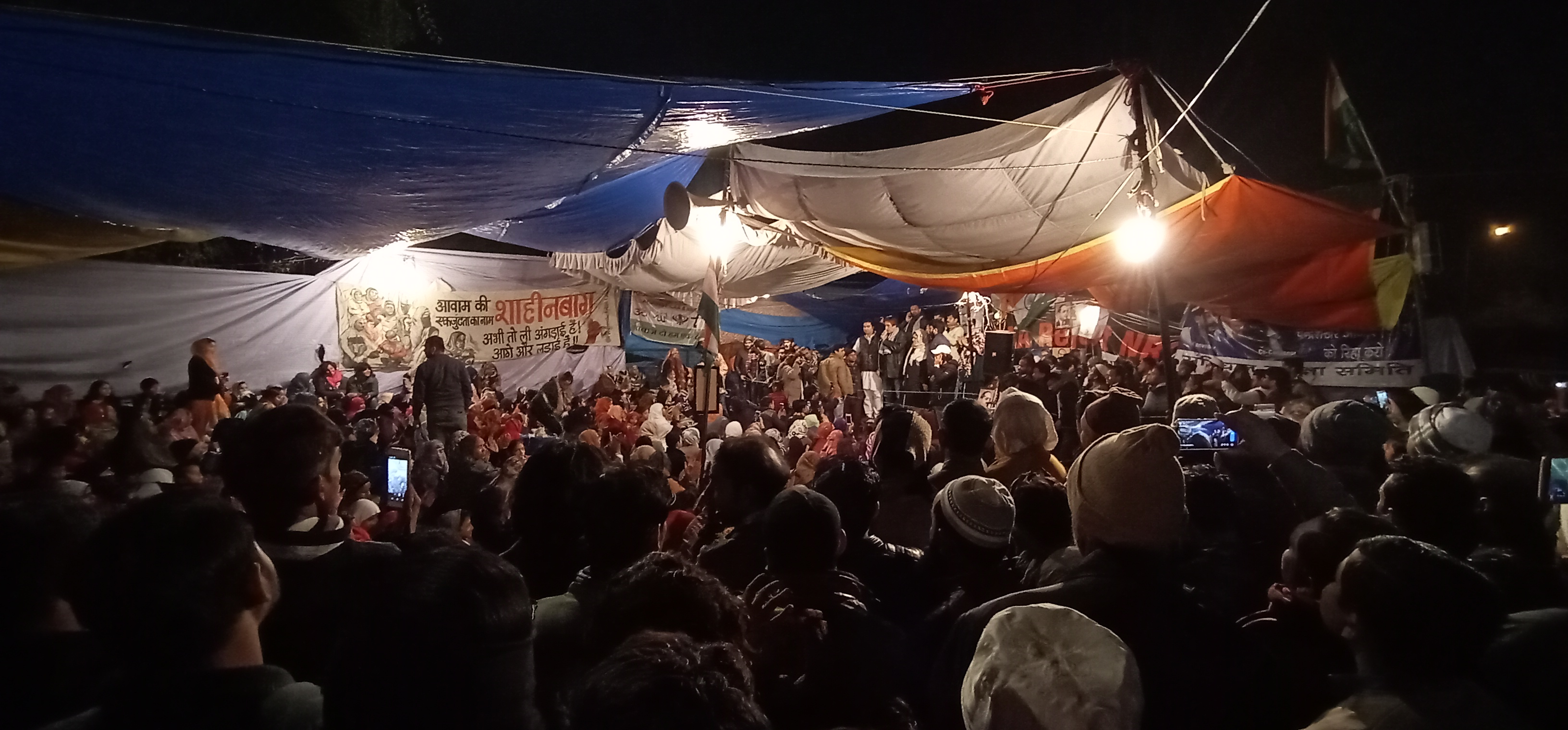
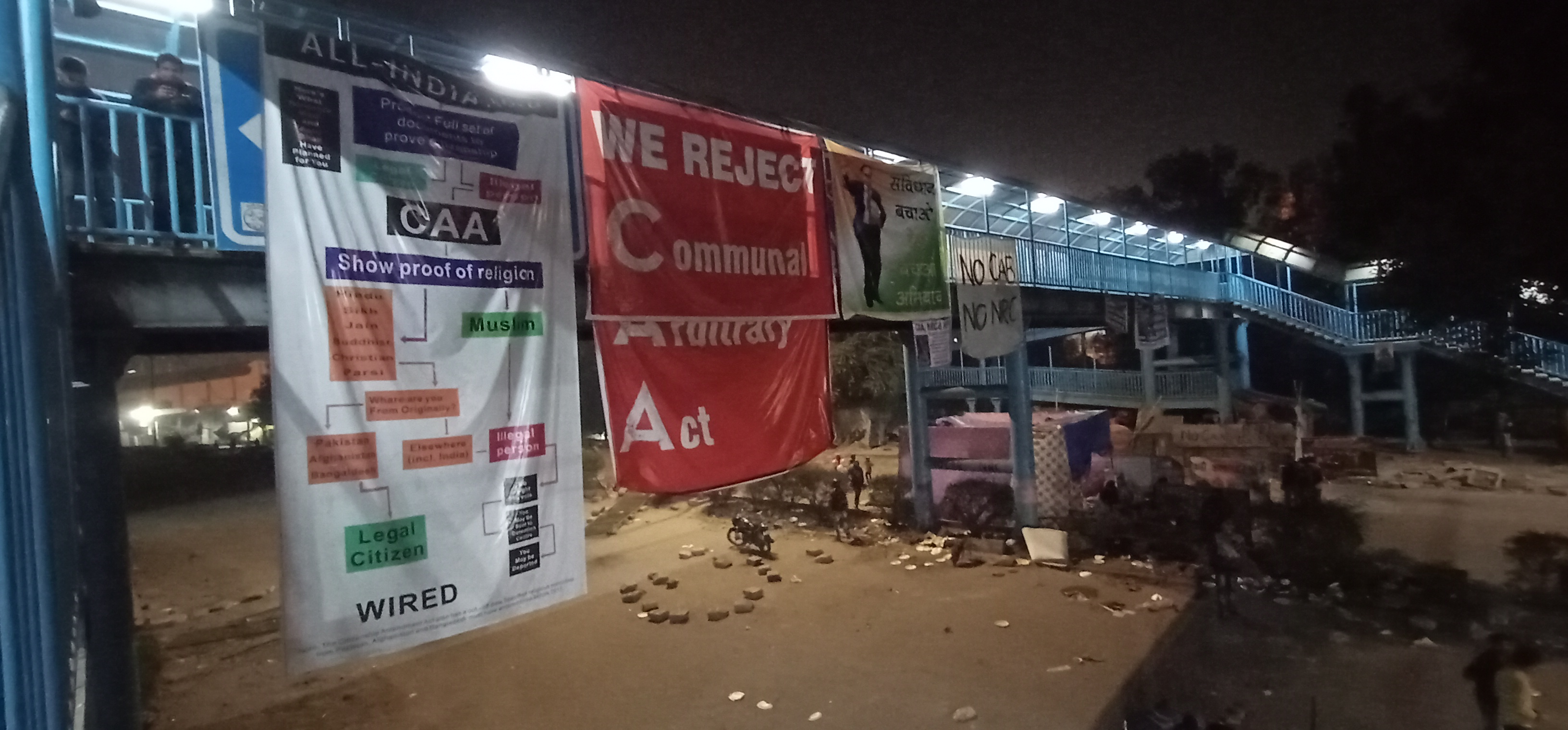
Shaheen Bagh protests on 4 January 2020. Protesters are still gathered blocking a major New Delhi road for over three weeks. (Bottom) Huge anti-CAA NRC banners across a footbridge at Shaheen Bagh.

- LGBT Rights activists protested against the CAA and NRC at the Kolkata Pride Parade.

- 30 December

- Delhi Police arrested street vendors, accusing them of stone pelting and inciting violence during the Jamia Milia Islamia attacks.

- 31 December

- Protests were held during New Year's Eve celebrations in Delhi, Hyderabad, Bhubaneshwar, Mumbai and Kolkata.

=== 2020 ===
==== January ====
- 1 January

- About 50,000–170,000 people participated in an anti-CAA rally organised by Muslim organisations in Kochi. The numbers swelled to 500,000, the unusually large size of the protest causing a complete standstill of traffic throughout the city.

- 3 January

- The UP Police admitted that it had wrongfully accused and arrested poor innocent people; and released four minors from jail due to lack of evidence.

- 4 January

- More than 100,000 protesters attended a protest march named "Million March" against the Citizenship Amendment Bill held in Hyderabad.
- In Bangalore hundreds of protesters participated in a rally and accused the Modi government of attempting to divide India on the basis of religion, and distracting people from the issues of economic slowdown and unemployment in the country.

- 5 January

- A masked mob, allegedly composed of Hindu extremists from the Akhil Bharatiya Vidyarthi Parishad, armed with rods and sticks attacked the campus of Jawaharlal Nehru University, Delhi and injured more than 40 students and teachers. The attack was described as an attempt to suppress student activism during the Citizenship Amendment Act protests.

- 6 January

- 50,000 women held an "all women's rally" in Malegaon, Maharashtra.

- 7 January

- Women in Kolkata started a sit-in protest at the grounds of Park Circus in Kolkata.

- 8 January

- PM Modi cancelled his visit to Assam, while the CAA protests continued. AASU had planned huge protests during Modi's visit.
- Thousands of people joined the anti-CAA protests at Dibrugarh, Guwahati and other parts of Assam.

- 9 January

- Students of JNU attempted to march towards Rashtrapati Bhavan, the official residence of the President of India while blocking Janpath. Police detained around 100 students when the march was blocking Janpath.
- The Chief Justice of India dismissed a petition by a lawyer demanding that the CAA be declared constitutionally valid, stating that "There is anyway a presumption of constitutionality".
- Asom Jatiyatabadi Yuba Chatra Parishad (AJYCP) along with All Assam Students’ Union (AASU), the Krishak Mukti Sangram Samiti (KMSS) and 30 other organisations and artist communities organised protests against CAA in Guwahati. They demanded "corruption-free, foreigner-free, terrorism-free and pollution-free Assam" from the Chief Minister of Assam, Sarbananda Sonowal rather than implementing CAA-NRC.

- 10 January

- The Citizenship Amendment Act came into force.
- The Delhi High Court dismissed a plea to remove the protesters occupying Shaheen Bagh.

- 11 January

- PM Modi visited Kolkata on a two day official visit. Hundreds of people protested against CAA at the Kolkata airport.
- Several parties and student unions launched a protest at the Dorina Crossing at Esplanade in Kolkata. SFI leader stated that the protests would continue till Sunday, until PM Modi (who had been visiting the city) was in Kolkata.
- A "Tiranga Rally" against the CAA was held in Hyderabad, with thousands of people displaying the national flag. Police officers were seen caning peaceful protesters.
- Pradyot Manikya Debbarma, the royal scion of the Manikya dynasty, led the largest protest in Tripura as of 11 January 2020 consisting of thousands of people. Debbarma stated that beneficiaries of CAA will not be allowed to settle in Tripura. He added that the state has already accommodated many migrants from East Pakistan and further immigration due to CAA will endanger the threatened indigenous residents of Tripura.

- 12 January

- In Kolkata, the protesters outside the venue of PM Modi's speech were detained by the police.
- Thousands of people join the anti CAA protests at Jogeshwari in Mumbai. Slogans such as "I Am From Gujarat, My Documents Burned in 2002", "No CAA, Boycott NRC, Stop Dividing India, Don't Divide us", "Save Constitution", were displayed on the banners.
- The Indian National Congress demanded the withdrawal of CAA, and stopping of the process to update NPR. It claimed that the NPR was a 'disguised NRC'.

- 13 January

- The Parliamentary panel on Home Affairs criticised the Delhi Police for the violent crackdown on Jamia and JNU and asked them not to be harsh.
- A meeting of 20 opposition parties in Delhi released a statement demanding a revocation of the CAA and asked all the Chief Ministers who have refused to implement the NRC in their states to stop the work of updating the National Population Register, as it is the foundation of NRC.
- At Jamia Millia Islamia, several student groups protested outside the office of Vice-Chancellor Najma Akhtar asking to reschedule the exam dates, filing a case against Delhi Police and ensuring the safety of students. The VC announced in the afternoon, that a case will be filed against police on 14 January.

- 14 January

- The Kerala government approached the Supreme Court to challenge the CAA under Section 131 of the Constitution and became the first state to do so.
- Mani Shankar Aiyar of the Indian National Congress joined the anti CAA protesters at Shaheen Bagh.
- 5000 women staged a sit-in protest at Mansoor Ali park in Prayagraj, Uttar Pradesh.
- In Mumbai, a group of students attended the India v/s Australia match at Wankhede stadium and peacefully protested by wearing T-shirts with the message "No NPR, NO NRC and NO CAA".
- In Gujarat, people celebrated Makar Sankranti by flying kites with slogans for and against CAA.

- 15 January

- More than 200,000 people joined the Anti-CAA protests in Mangalore, where hundreds of people came in boats carrying Indian flags. Activists Harsh Mander and former IAS officer Kannan Gopinathan gave speeches during the protests. The protests ended peacefully with the singing of National anthem.
- Women conducted sit-in protests at Patna's Sabzibagh and Kolkata's Park Circus, Allahabad's Roshan Bagh, Kanpur's Chaman Ganj, Gaya's Shanti Bagh along with Delhi's Shaheen Bagh.
- A petition was filed in Gujarat High court asking its intervention to allow citizens to hold Anti-CAA protests in Ahmedabad. The petitioners stated that the Gujarat Police did not grant them permission for peaceful protests but granted permission to 62 programmes held by the ruling BJP to support the CAA. The court asked the police to decide properly on the protesters' applications.
- A Delhi court granted bail and released Bhim Army chief Chandrashekhar Azad aka "Raavan", who had been arrested for his protest in December against CAA at Jama Masjid, Delhi.
- Aligarh Muslim University (AMU) postpones all exams due to the ongoing CAA protests.

- 16 January

- Police in Chennai banned all protests in the city for a period of 15 days. Five women and one man (including a physically disabled person) were detained by the police for protesting against CAA.

- 17 January

- Inspired by the Shaheen Bagh protest, a massive anti-CAA-NRC-NPR protest was started in Mumbai. Around 10,000 women gathered at the YMCA ground in Mumbai to protest in the evening. The protest was organised by a Non-governmental organisation named Mumbai Citizen Quorum.
- Around 500 women began a sit-in protest at the Clock tower grounds in Lucknow, Uttar Pradesh.

- 18 January

- Uttar Pradesh police cracked down on the CAA protesters demonstrating near the Clock Tower in Lucknow and snatched their personal belongings.

- 19 January

- In Delhi, hundreds of protesters joined a protest march holding lighted candles from Jamia University to Shaheen Bagh.
- In Berlin, Germany more than 200 people join the protest march against CAA, NRC and the JNU attack. The march was led by the Indian diaspora and started at the Brandenburg Gate and ended at the Indian Embassy.
- An all women protest started on 11 January, outside Konark Mall in Pune, organised by Kul Jamaat-e-Tanzeem, an umbrella body of several organisations, reached its ninth day with around 500–600 protesters participating all throughout the day.

- 20 January

- Several Labour Party MPs of the UK parliament discussed concerns regarding the CAA, in a meeting organised by South Asia Solidarity Group (SASG) and Ambedkar International Mission (UK) in London. The MPs expressed concern on its implications on human rights and disenfranchisement of the Muslim community.

- 21 January

- More than 300,000 people join an anti-CAA protest rally at Kalaburagi in Karnataka.
- In UP's Etawah, a video emerged that showed Police chasing and attacking the women protesters with batons in their attempts to break the protest.
- In a unique way of protesting, more than a hundred women protesters at Khureji Khas in Delhi released 10,000 gas filled black coloured balloons with the message "No CAA NPR NRC".
- Police register cases against 160 women for violation of the ban on assembly and protesting against CAA in Lucknow.
- Despite ban on assembly, Home Minister Amit Shah was allowed by the administration to address a pro CAA public rally at Lucknow. Amit Shah said that the protesters could continue protesting but the government would not revoke the CAA.
- Various college students' associations had called a complete shutdown of colleges and universities in the north-east on 22 Jan, asking the Supreme Court to declare CAA as unconstitutional.

- 22 January

- Thousands of students from 9 universities in North-East India boycott classes and join protest march in the states of Assam, Nagaland, Meghalaya and Arunachal Pradesh.
- A 5 kilometre long procession against CAA was led by CM Mamata Banerjee in Darjeeling, West Bengal.
- Women continued sit-in protests for the third day at the Haj House near Kadru Over Bridge in Ranchi, Jharkhand.
- 144 CAA related petitions scheduled for hearing in the Supreme Court of India were brought up. Chief Justice of India Sharad A. Bobde had led the three-judge bench. The court gave notice to the government on the petitions and allowed one month to respond in the next hearing in February. The Supreme Court also segregated the case of Assam and Tripura considering the fact of cross-border infiltration and assured of looking into the matter separately.
- A fact-finding team consisting of students of various prominent universities like Banaras Hindu University, Jamia Millia Islamia and JNU released a report after visiting 15 violence-affected cities in Uttar Pradesh and accused the Uttar Pradesh police of brutality in dealing with protesters and attacking Muslims. The police was accused of violating basic principles of fire arms usage by firing above the waist.
- While addressing a Pro-CAA public meeting in Lucknow the CM of UP threatened to charge the protesters with sedition if they raised slogans demanding Azadi (Freedom) in Uttar Pradesh.

- 24 January

- A statewide shutdown, "Maharashtra Bandh" was organised by Vanchit Bahujan Aghadi (VBA) across Maharashtra state, to protest against the CAA and the economic policies of the BJP-led central government, which according to the organisers "were ruining the country".
- Curfew was imposed in Jharkhand's Lohardaga district after a clash and violence between pro and anti CAA protesters.

- 25 January

- In London, around 2000 people from the Indian diaspora and the Human Rights organisation conducted a protest march against CAA from the Downing Street to the Indian High Commission.
- More than a thousand women staged a sit-in protest at Frazer Town in Bangalore for 48 hours.

- 26 January

- More than 300 eminent personalities in India including actor Naseeruddin Shah, Javed Jaffrey, and film-maker Mira Nair signed and issued an open statement against the CAA.
- On the occasion of Republic Day, protests were held in Delhi, Mumbai, Hyderabad, Chicago, and London.
- 6-7 million people participated in a human chain extending from Kasaragod to Kaliyikkavila organised by the LDF in Kerala.

- 30 January

- A juvenile Hindu fundamentalist opened fire at a protest at the Jamia Milia Islamia, injuring one student. The event happened on the 72nd anniversary of the assassination of Mahatma Gandhi, also by a Hindu fundamentalist. He was arrested and charged with attempted murder. The man shouted slogans of "Jai Shri Ram" (Victory to Lord Rama) and "Delhi Police Zindabad" (Long live Delhi police).
- Bihar Police detained CPI leader Kanhaiya Kumar before he could start his planned month-long "Jan-Gana-Man Yatra" which was organised at Champaran on Mahatma Gandhi's death anniversary.
- Seven protesters who were protesting at the Ghantaghar (Clock Tower) in Lucknow. They were arrested for taking out a candle march, which UP Police said was a violation of section 144 of the CrPC which was imposed in the area.

- 31 January

- Leaders from 14 opposition parties, led by the Indian National Congress, wore black armbands and vacated the front row seats to protest against the new law, the NRC and the NPR during President Ram Nath Kovind's address to the Joint Session of the Parliament of India for 2020 budget session. The Leader of the Opposition in the Rajya Sabha, Ghulam Nabi Azad said that the Union Government misused the President's office and it was "shameful" that the government had included the CAA in the President's speech as an achievement.

==== February ====
- 1 February

- After the JMI firing incident on 30 January, another Hindu fundamentalist fired bullets in the air during the Shaheen Bagh protests. The man chanted the slogans "Hindu Rashtra Zindabad" (Long live the Hindu Rashtra) and "Sirf Hinduo ki chalegi" (Only Hindus will rule in this country).
- Amnesty International informed US lawmakers that the CAA clearly violates the Constitution of India and International human rights law and "legitimises discrimination" on the basis of religion.
- Thousands of LGBT rights activists protest raised slogans against the CAA at the Queer Azaadi Pride Parade in Mumbai.

- 6 February

- In Bidar, a mother and a school principal were arrested after the mother's daughter participated in a play against the CAA.

- 7 February

- The Bidar police interrogated 85 school-children studying in classes 4–6 for participating in an anti-CAA play.
- Ahead of the 2020 Delhi Legislative Assembly election, two bike-borne men allegedly opened fired in the air near an anti-Citizenship Amendment Act (CAA) protest site in Northeast Delhi's Jafrabad. The police, however, suspected personal enmity.

- 8 February

- A Muslim BJP councillor in Indore resigned from the party, accusing it of spreading "politics of hatred".

- 11 February

- Jamia Milia Islamia students staged a march to the Parliament against the CAA and NRC. The march was stopped by the Delhi police who detained protesters. The police allegedly sexually assaulted the protesters.

- 16 February

- Imran Pratapgarhi, an Indian National Congress politician was fined ₹1.04 crore (equivalent to ₹1.3 crore or US$143,000 in 2026) for violating Section 144 by addressing protestors, participating in an anti-CAA protest in Moradabad, Uttar Pradesh, and allegedly instigating protesters at the Idgah ground.

- 17 February

- Over 150 prominent citizens including former judges, bureaucrats, army officers and academicians wrote to President Ram Nath Kovind, claiming that the anti-CAA protests were based on a false narrative, and urged the centre to look into the ongoing protests with all seriousness, safeguard the nation's democratic institutions and take stern action against the people behind them.
- Magsaysay Award recipient Sandeep Pandey was arrested by the Lucknow police for attempting to protest. He was released on bail after being produced in the District Magistrate's court.

- 18 February

- The Uttar Pradesh government informed the Allahabad High Court that 22 had been killed in the protests and a total of 883 people had been arrested in connection with violence during the protests.

- 19 February

- Secretary-General of the United Nations António Guterres expressed concerns over the possibility of millions being rendered stateless due to the CAA and NRC.
- In Chennai, a confederation of Muslim groups led a massive rally towards the Secretariat of Tamil Nadu in a demonstration against the CAA. It came a day after the Madras High Court denied permission to protesters to protest near the state assembly and press for passage of a resolution against CAA, NRC and NPR.

- 20 February

- All India Majlis-e-Ittehadul Muslimeen leader and spokesperson Waris Pathan stoked controversy at a rally in Karnataka's Gulbarga district by stating "To those saying we have only put our women at the forefront – only the lionesses are out and you're already sweating. Imagine what would happen if we all came together. We are 15 crore, but that can outweigh 100 crore, remember that." The politician withdrew his statement on 23 February, saying that he had no intentions of hurting the sentiments of any community, after criticism from both the ruling and opposition parties.

- 22 February

- About 200 Women gathered near the Jaffrabad Metro Station in Delhi at night protesting against the CAA and NRC.
- Chief Minister of Maharashtra Uddhav Thackeray decided to not pass a resolution against the CAA, making Maharashtra the first UPA-ruled state to decide not to pass a resolution.

- 23 February

- The protest in the Jaffrabad Metro Station continued for the second day. Around 500 people mostly women gathered around the metro station that leads to closing the entry and exit from the metro station.

- 24 February

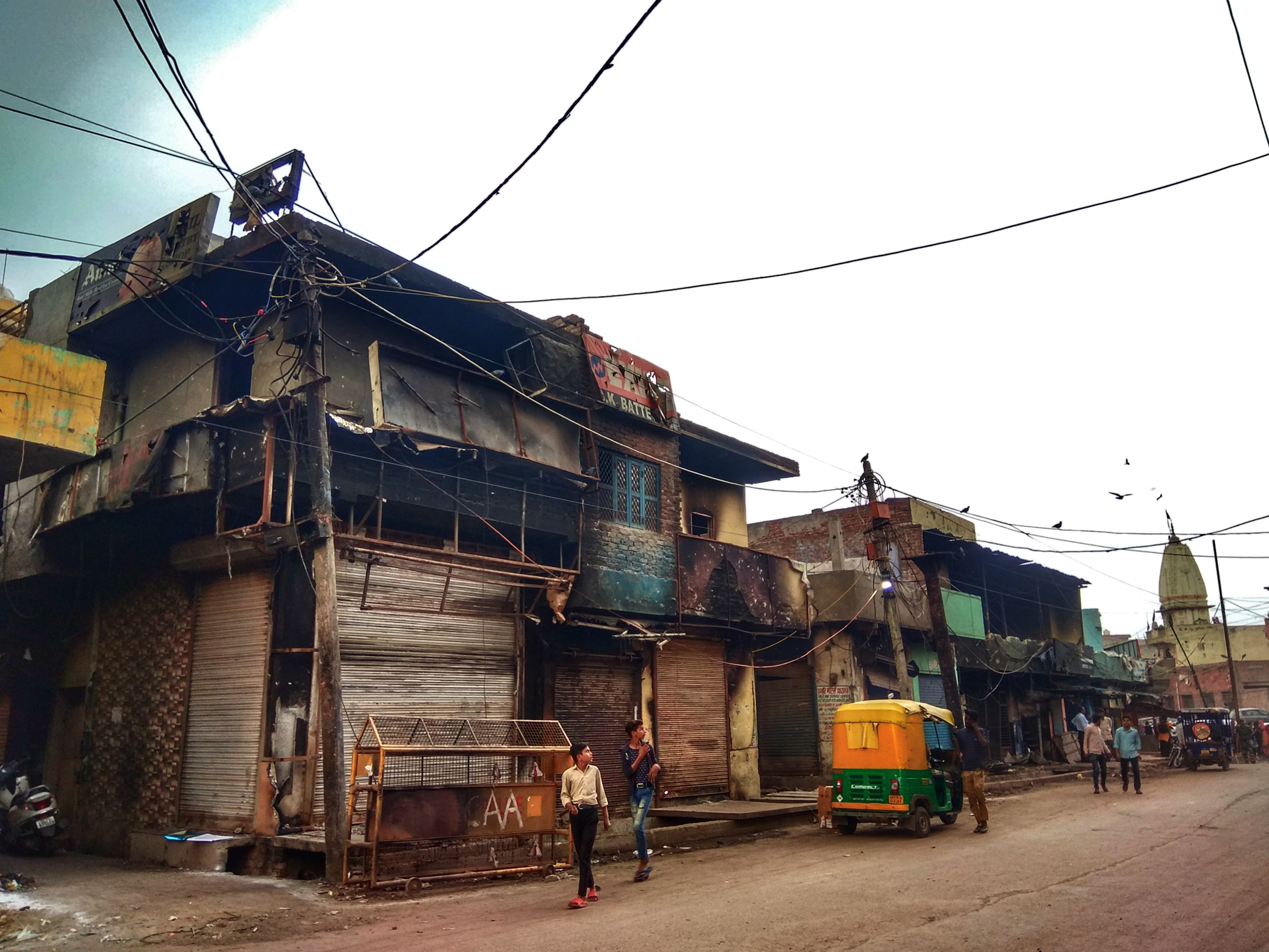
The burnt shops at Shiv Vihar in North East Delhi riots.

- One policeman and four protestors were killed and several shops and vehicles were burnt during a violent protest in Delhi.
- 13 people were killed in the North East Delhi riots.

- 25 February

- A shoot-at-sight order was issued in the evening by Delhi Police after the Anti-CAA and Pro-CAA protests became violent.
- The Central Board of Secondary Education postponed board examinations for classes 10 and 12 in northeast Delhi, in view of ongoing riots in the area. However, exams for the rest of Delhi and India would be conducted as per schedule.

- 26 February

- The Delhi High Court in an emergency late-night hearing, asked the police to ensure safe passage for those injured in the North East Delhi riots to the hospitals.
- The Delhi High Court asked the police to file First information reports against various politicians who were involved in making inflammatory speeches, provoking rioters in North East Delhi.

- 27 February

- One day after Delhi High Court judge S. Muralidhar directed Delhi police to file an FIR against those who had made inflammatory speeches, the President of India ordered his transfer with the recommendation of Supreme Court of India.

==== March ====
- 3 March

- The UN High Commissioner filed an intervention application in the Supreme Court to be made a party in the case.

=== 2024 ===
- 3 March
  - In response to the perceived lack of action by existing student unions, a new initiative called the Wesean Student Federation (WSF) was formed in March 2024. The WSF and other organisations like the Naga Student Federation has also sought international intervention on the issue, urging the United Nations to address the discriminatory nature of the CAA and its potential threat to the sovereignty and rights of indigenous peoples in the region.

== Resolutions ==
So far, at least eight states have announced that they will not implement the Act or the National Register of Citizens (NRC). While one state and two Union Territories have refused to implement the CAA, three other states have only declined the implementation of the NRC. However, the Union Home Ministry said that states lack the legal power to stop the implementation of Citizenship Amendment Act.

=== Resolutions against CAA ===
- A resolution to scrap the CAA was moved by Chief Minister of Kerala, Pinarayi Vijayan in the Kerala Legislative Assembly. It was eventually passed by an absolute majority, with only the lone BJP MLA voting against it.
- The Pattali Makkal Katchi, a member of the BJP-led National Democratic Alliance passed a resolution against the NRC. It had urged the Central Government and the State Government of Tamil Nadu not to extend the NRC in the state citing that it would create tension and fear in the society.
- The Punjab Legislative Assembly, that has the Indian National Congress in the majority, passed a resolution against the Act and urged the Modi Government to avoid discrimination on the basis of religion through the new Act. The resolution was moved by Punjab minister for parliamentary affairs Brahm Mohindra of the Congress and was supported by the Aam Aadmi Party and the Lok Insaaf Party.
- The Rajasthan Legislative Assembly that has the Indian National Congress in the majority, passed a resolution asking the Central government to repeal the CAA, making Rajasthan the third state to do so after Kerala and Punjab.
- A resolution to repeal the CAA was moved in the West Bengal Legislative Assembly by the All India Trinamool Congress headed by the Chief Minister, Mamata Banerjee and eventually got passed on 27 January 2020, becoming the fourth state assembly to do so. The West Bengal Assembly had also previously passed a resolution against the NRC in September 2019 and the first state assembly to pass a resolution against the proposed NRC.
- A five-page resolution against the CAA was drafted by 154 members of the European Parliament, who stated that it "marks a dangerous shift in the way citizenship will be determined in India and is set to create the largest statelessness crisis in the world and cause immense human suffering".
- The Madhya Pradesh Legislative Assembly passed a resolution against the CAA, becoming the fifth state to do so, after Rajasthan, West Bengal, Kerala and Punjab.
- The Bihar Legislative Assembly on 25 February 2020 unanimously passed a resolution not to implement the NRC in the State. It also said the NPR would be implemented in Bihar in the old 2010 format.
- The National Assembly of Pakistan passed a resolution labelling the Act as a "discriminatory law" and argued that it contravened "bilateral agreements and understandings between India and Pakistan, particularly those on security and rights of minorities in the respective countries".
- On 12 February 2020, Puducherry Legislative Assembly passed a resolution against the amended Citizenship Act, becoming the first union territory in the country to say no to the new law. The resolution passed by the Congress-led government in Puducherry also opposed the NRC and the NPR.
- The Gram panchayat of Islak, of Ahmednagar, Maharastra passed a resolution in January 2020 against the CAA, the NRC and the NPR, becoming the first Indian Gram Panchayat to do so. After Islak, Ghatnandur of Ambajogai, Maharastra, Loutolim of Goa and the panchayat of Patrud village of Beed, Maharastra have passed a resolutions against the CAA.
- On 13 March 2020, The Delhi Legislative Assembly passed a resolution against the CAA, becoming the second union territory to do so, after Puducherry.
- The Telangana Assembly has passed a resolution opposing the CAA, the NPR and the NRC moved by the Telangana Rashtra Samithi headed by the Chief minister K. Chandrashekar Rao. It has emerged as the 7th state to take decisions against the CAA, NPR and NCR. The resolution stated the Act as unconstitutional and urged the Union Government to remove all references to religion and any particular country.
- Several US cities and counties — Seattle, Albany, St. Paul, Hamtramck, Cambridge, San Francisco, Riverdale and Alameda County — have passed resolutions against the CAA and NRC.
- On 13 July 2020, New Westminster in the province of British Columbia, Canada passed a resolution against CAA and urged the Canadian government to "take a position in opposition."
- The Sree Sankaracharya University of Sanskrit (SSUS) at Kalady in Kerala become the first university in the country to pass a resolution against the Citizenship Amendment Act by its syndicate in January 2020. This was followed by Calicut University in the same month.

== Protests ==
After the bill was approved on 4 December 2019, violent protests erupted in Assam, especially in Guwahati, and other areas in the state. Reactionary protests were held as well in several metropolitan cities across India, including Delhi, Bangalore, Ahmedabad, Hyderabad, Jaipur, Kolkata and Mumbai.

Reactionary protests were also held at universities across the country including Cotton University, Gauhati University, IIT Bombay, Madras University, Presidency University, Kolkata, Jamia Millia Islamia, Osmania University, University of Hyderabad, University of Delhi, Panjab University and Aligarh Muslim University. By 16 December, the protests had spread across India with demonstrations occurring in at least 17 cities including Chennai, Jaipur, Bhopal, Lucknow and Puducherry.

Between 16 and 18 December, a statement of solidarity "condemning the recent police action and brutalization of students at Jamia Millia University and Aligarh Muslim University" had acquired 10,293 signatories from over 1,100 universities, colleges and academic institutions across the world. Scholars from major academic institutions in India, including JNU, Delhi University, all the Indian Institutes of Technology, the Indian Statistical Institute, the Tata Institute of Fundamental Research, among many others had signed the solidarity statement. On 16 December, professors and students of IIM-Ahmedabad were detained by police citing demonstrating protest against the Act is illegal.

On 19 December police banned protests in several parts of India with the imposition of Section 144 which prohibits the gathering of more than 4 individuals in a public space as being unlawful, namely, parts of the capital New Delhi, Uttar Pradesh, and Karnataka, including Bangalore. As Section 144 was imposed, the students of IIM-Bangalore demonstrate their protest peacefully by laying shoes and placards in front of the institute gate, which they called the Shoe Satyagraha. Following IIM-Ahmedabad and Bangalore, IIM-Calcutta raised their voice peacefully in solidarity against the Act and the brutal misconduct by police against the students who were protesting all over the country. Several institutes in Kozhikode including IIM-Kozhikode, NIT-Calicut, Government Medical College, Kozhikode and Farook College expressed their protest from 19 to 20 December. Police in Chennai denied permission for marches, rallies or any other demonstration. Internet services were also shutdown in some parts of Delhi. As a result of defying the ban, thousands of protesters were detained, primarily in Delhi, including several opposition leaders and activists such as Ramachandra Guha, Sitaram Yechury, Yogendra Yadav, Umar Khalid, Sandeep Dikshit, and D Raja. Despite the fear of being detained, tens of thousands of people protested in Hyderabad, Patna, Chandigarh, Mumbai and other cities. Civil society groups, political parties, students, activists and ordinary citizens used social medial platforms to ask people to turn up and protest peacefully. The protests involving 20,000 protesters concluded peacefully at the August Kranti Maidan at Mumbai.

More than 300 eminent personalities in India signed and issued an open statement against the CAA. The signatories including actor Naseeruddin Shah, Ratna Patak Shah, Jaaved Jafferi, Nandita Das, Lillete Dubey film-maker Mira Nair, writers Anita Desai, Kiran Desai, actors, sociologist Ashis Nandy, activists Sohail Hashmi and Shabnam Hashmi among others.

=== Assam ===
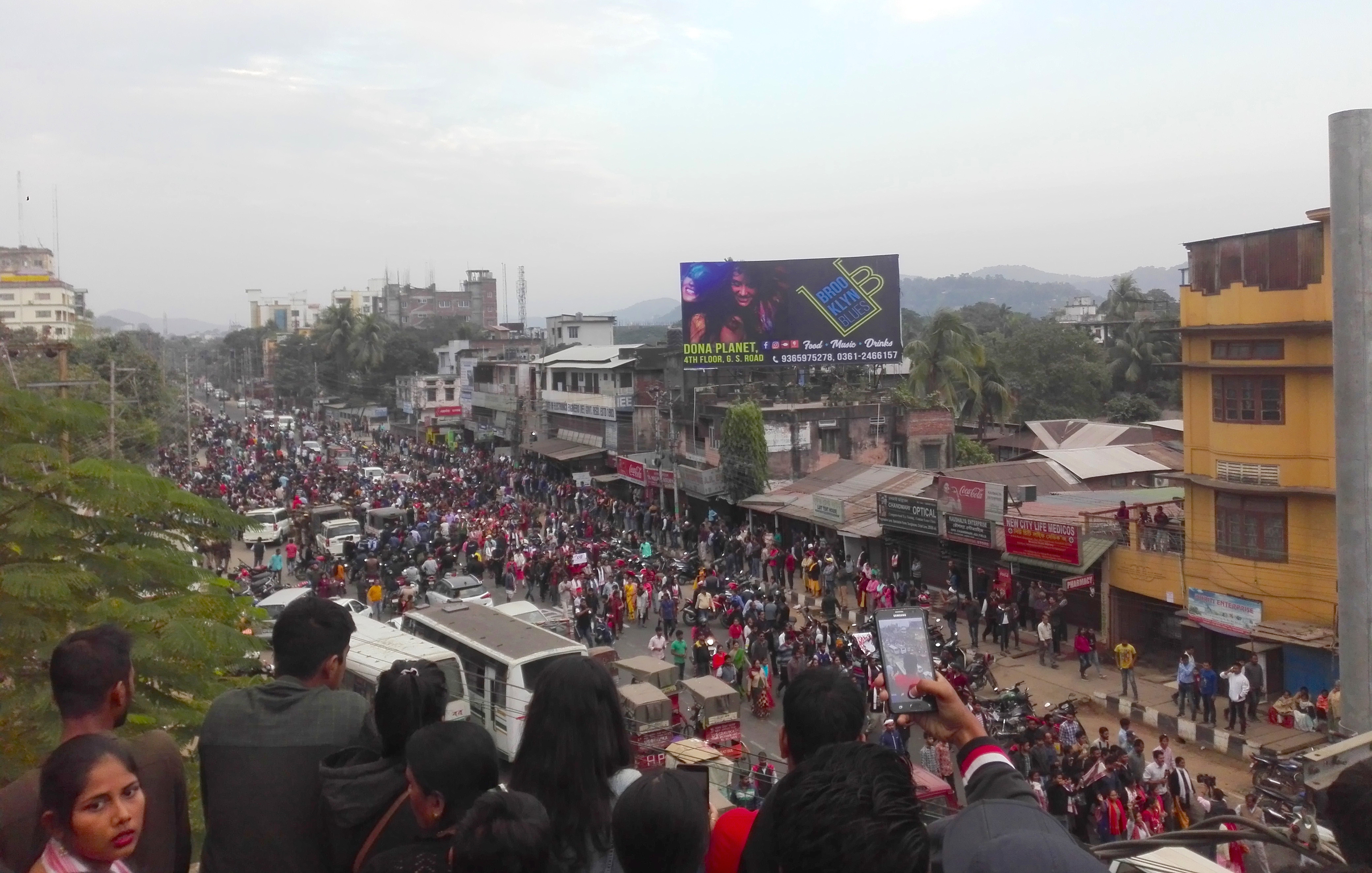
Mass Gathering of Anti Citizenship Act protests at Chandmari, Guwahati, Assam

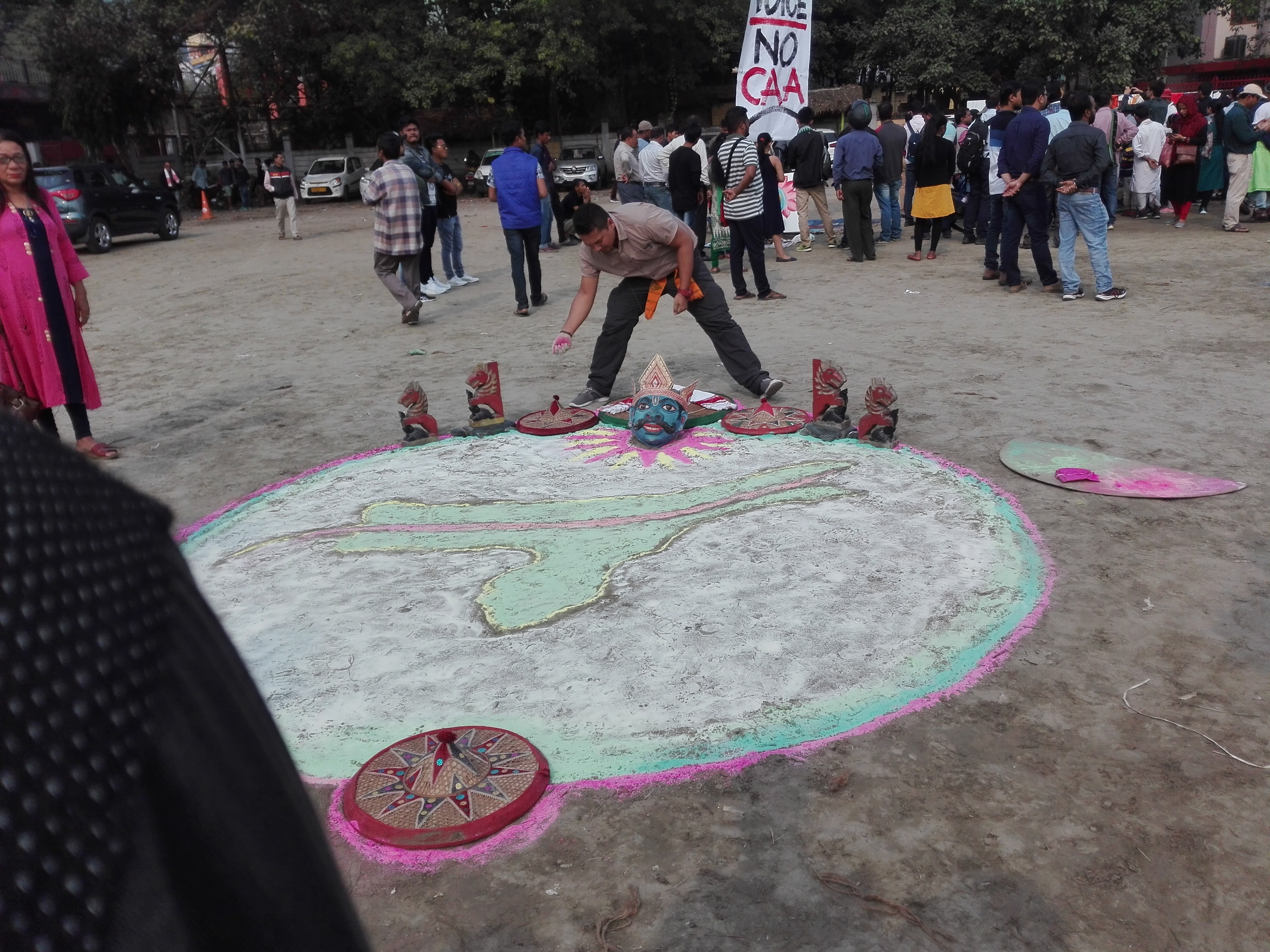
A Rangoli created as a part of protests against anti Citizenship Act 2019 at Chandmari, Guwahati, Assam

Students of Cotton University began protesting against the CAA a few days before the controversial bill was produced on the floor of the Lok Sabha. On 29 November, the students staged a silent protest outside the university campus. After the bill was cleared on 4 December 2019, violent protests erupted in Assam, especially in Guwahati, and other areas in the state. Reuters reported that the protests in the state were violent, adding that at least two people were killed till 16 December. Buildings and railway stations were set on fire.

The CAA made 2014 as the cut-off date to determine illegal foreigners but according to people opposing the act, Assam bore the brunt of immigrants from 1951 to 1971, while other states did not. The protesters were angry that the new law would allow thousands of Bengali speaking non-Muslim immigrants from Bangladesh to become legal citizens of India, thereby influencing the political and cultural environment of Assam. Thousands of members and workers of the All Assam Students Union (AASU) and 30 other indigenous organisations, artists, cultural activists of the state gathered at Latasil ground in Dispur to stage a satyagraha against the Act on 16, 17 and 18 December. Assam Police subsequently detained the general secretary and the adviser to the AASU and over 2,000 protesters in Guwahati during a protest rally on 18 December.

On 12 December, security personnel, including CRPF jawans with batons and shields barged into the office of a private TV channel of Assam, Prag News in Guwahati and attacked its staffers with batons during protests. On 20 December, Assamese language newspapers reported violent incidents occurring during the protests across the state. Use of excessive force by the police was also reported. In Dibrugarh, the All Assam Students Union members vandalised the district office of the Asom Gana Parishad, which had voted in favour of the act as part of the ruling Coalition.

Peasant leader Akhil Gogoi was arrested in Jorhat on 12 December as a preventive measure by authorities to prevent him from organising any protests. A special court of National Investigation Agency (NIA) in Guwahati on Tuesday charged him under sedition for "maoist links" and sent him to 10-day NIA custody. The Assam Human rights Commission decided to take suo moto cognizance of reports of alleged torture upon Akhil Gogoi. According to the Assam Government, people have been arrested by the Assam Police for their alleged involvement in the violent incidents during the anti-CAA protests across the state, as of 17 December.

In Dispur, several thousands of protesters broke down police barricades to protest in front of the Assam Legislative Assembly building. Demonstrations were also held in Agartala. On 15 December 2019, a concert was staged by artistes of Assam as a protest against the CAA. The concert was themed as 'No CAA, Concert for peace and harmony'. Along with music, paintings were also demonstrated in the event.

Access to the internet was restricted in Assam by the administrative authorities. A curfew was also declared in Assam and Tripura due to the protests, leading to army deployment as protesters defied the curfews. Railway services were suspended and some airlines started to waive rescheduling or cancellation fees in those areas. Officials reported that at least four people died after clashes with police in Guwahati. Two men, Dipanjal Das and Sam Stafford, died due to police firing on 12 December. On 15 December, Gauhati Medical College and Hospital official stated that Ishwar Nayak died on the night of 14 December and Abdul Alim died on 15 December morning. Both of them had been admitted to the hospital after suffering gunshot wounds. As of 15 December, it was reported that at least 6 people had died due to police firing during the protests. After ten days of restriction, mobile internet services in the state were restored from 20 December, although the Gauhati High Court had ordered the government of Assam to restore the service by 5 pm on 19 December. By 22 December, the number of arrested people rose to 393, with 28 cases being registered for making offensive and provocative posts on social media.

On 21 December, an all-woman protest was organised across the state. Senior citizens across the state protested on 23 December. Chowkidinghee playground in Dibrugarh saw one of the largest mass gatherings of CAA protests in Assam organised by All Assam Students' Union on 24 December.

On 8 January, PM Modi cancelled his visit to Assam while the protests continued in the state. AASU had planned huge protests during Modi's visit. Thousands of people joined the anti-CAA protests at Dibrugarh, Guwahati and other parts of Assam. The protesters dressed up in traditional dress of the region and sang devotional songs during the protest. The protesters also demanded the release of Akhil Gogoi and called the Modi government a dictatorship. On 9 January, musical protests were planned at Gauhati Club in Assam by AASU, along with 30 other organisations and artist communities.

On 22 January, thousands of students from 9 universities in North East India boycotted classes and joined a protest march in the states of Assam, Nagaland, Meghalaya and Arunachal Pradesh.

The then ADG and currently Director General of the Central Reserve Police Force G P Singh said "If a couple of bullet injuries can bring the situation to normalcy, it is ok."

=== Tripura ===
Several protests marches with thousands of protesters were held in Tripura. On 12 December BBC reported that the army had been deployed in the state and around 1800 people were arrested. Around 200 protesters were detained by police during a protest in the capital city of Agartala. On 11 December, Pradyot Manikya Debbarma, the royal scion, led the largest protest in Tripura so far consisting of thousands of people. Debbarma stated that beneficiaries of CAA would not be allowed to settle in Tripura. He added that the state has already accommodated many migrants from East Pakistan and further immigration due to CAA would endanger the threatened indigenous residents of the state.

The Act also ignited old conflicts between the Bengalis and the Reang refugees. Fresh clashes were reported in the northern district of Kanchanpur between the two communities. The Reang refugees were protesting against the CAA while the Hindu Bengalis were supporting it. Protesters reportedly threw stones and vandalised shops and a marketplace.

=== Crackdown on Universities ===
==== Jamia Millia Islamia ====
On 13 December 2019, the students of Jamia Millia Islamia University undertook a march to the Parliament protesting against the CAA. They were prevented from going ahead by the police who used batons and tear gas to disperse the protesters leading to clashes with them. Fifty students were detained by the police after the clash. According to the students, police attacked the peaceful protesters with stones and sticks, and several students were injured. The students then retaliated, and clashes ensued. Police denied the allegations, also claiming that the protesters attacked the policemen with stones after they were stopped from marching onwards. Police then used tear gas to disperse them. On the morning of 15 December 2019, more than two thousand students of Jamia joined the protests against CAA in Delhi. Jamia Millia Student Body and Jamia Millia Islamia Teacher's Association (JTA) condemned the violence that happened on the same day in Delhi and stated that no student or teacher was involved in the violence.

At 6:46 pm on 15 December 2019, hundreds of police officers forcefully entered the campus of Jamia, without the permission of college authority. The police used batons and tear gas on the protesting students. Nearly a hundred students were detained by the Delhi police and released at 3:30 am next morning. The visuals of students being dragged and assaulted by the police was telecast by news channels. Students from all across Delhi joined the agitation. About two hundred people were injured and were admitted to AIIMS and the Holy Family Hospital.

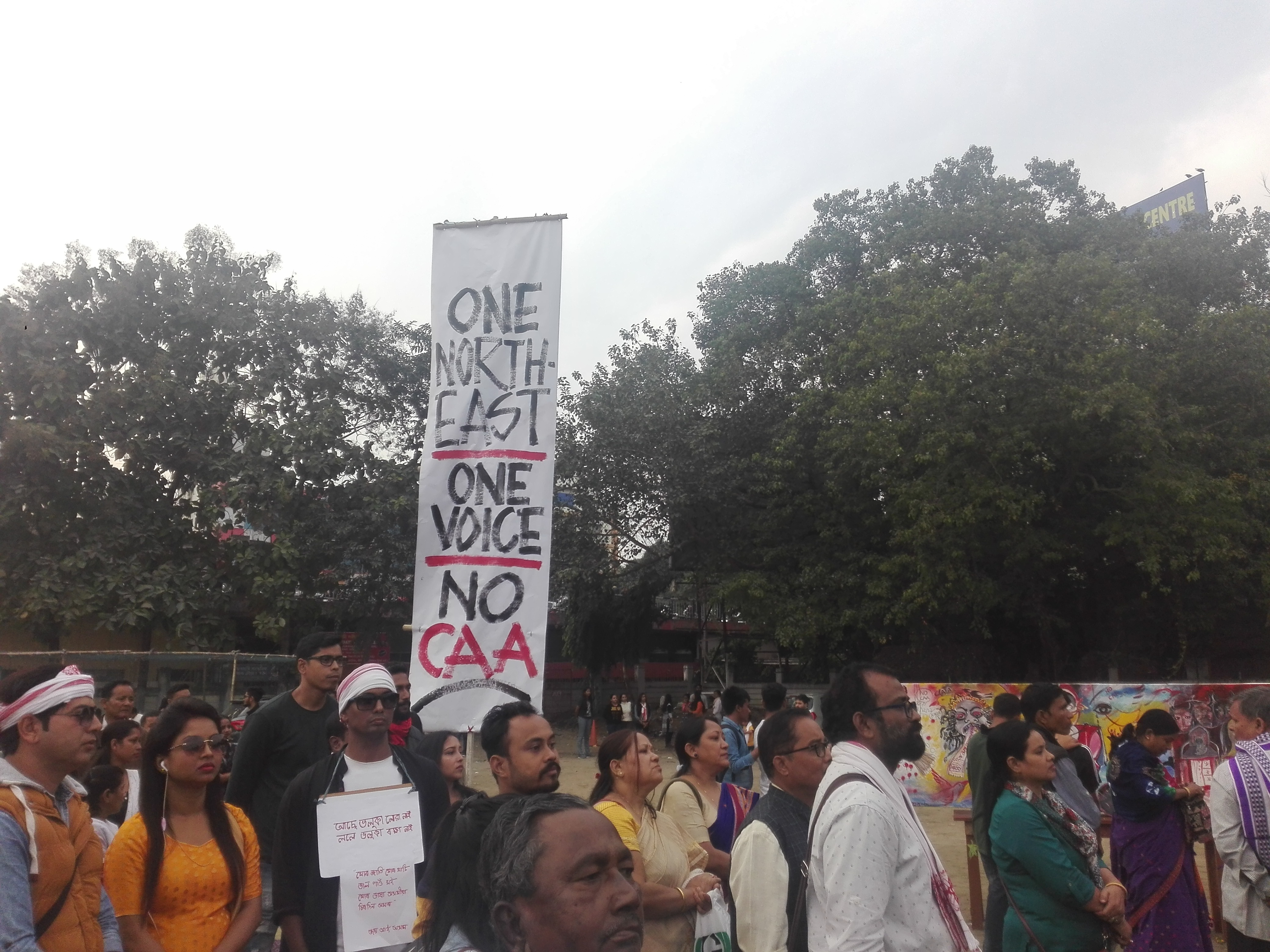
Anti-CAA Banner demonstrated at Cultural Protest organised by Artistes of Assam at AEI ground, Chandmari, Guwahati.

On 16 December 2019, two students of Jamia were admitted to the Safdarjung Hospital with bullet injuries received during the protests on 15 December. One of the victims, M. Tamin stated that he was not participating in the protest and was passing through the area on a motorcycle, when police suddenly started caning the protesters and he was shot in the leg by police from point blank range. According to the doctors treating him, the wounds were from a gunshot. The police stated that they were investigating the allegations of gunshot. The vice-chancellor stated that they will file a court case against the police, demanding an investigation on how police entered the university premises and assaulted the students. On 15 December, Delhi Police attacked students of Jamia Millia Islamia including Shaheen Abdullah, Chanda Yadav, Ladeeda Farzana and Aysha Renna at New Friends Colony. The university was shut until 5 January 2020 and the residents were asked to leave the campus.

Response

The police violence was heavily criticised by filmmaker Anurag Kashyap, actor John Cusack and Rajkummar Rao condemned the police violence, with Cusack referring it to fascism and Kashyap calling the government to be "clearly fascist". Actor Swara Bhaskar, praised the students protests for raising their voice against communalism and called the police action as dictatorial, brutal, shocking and shameful. She also questioned if it was the police and not the protesters who vandalised the property in Delhi and Aligarh.

Amnesty International India criticised the police for the violence against the students of Jamia and Aligarh University and stated that the allegations of police brutality and sexual harassment against the students should be investigated and culprits be punished. Defending the right of the students to protest, its director stated that the arrest of protesters violate India's obligations under the Article 19 and Article 21 of the International Covenant on Civil and Political Rights (ICCPR), to respect and protect the right to freedom of expression and peaceful assembly.

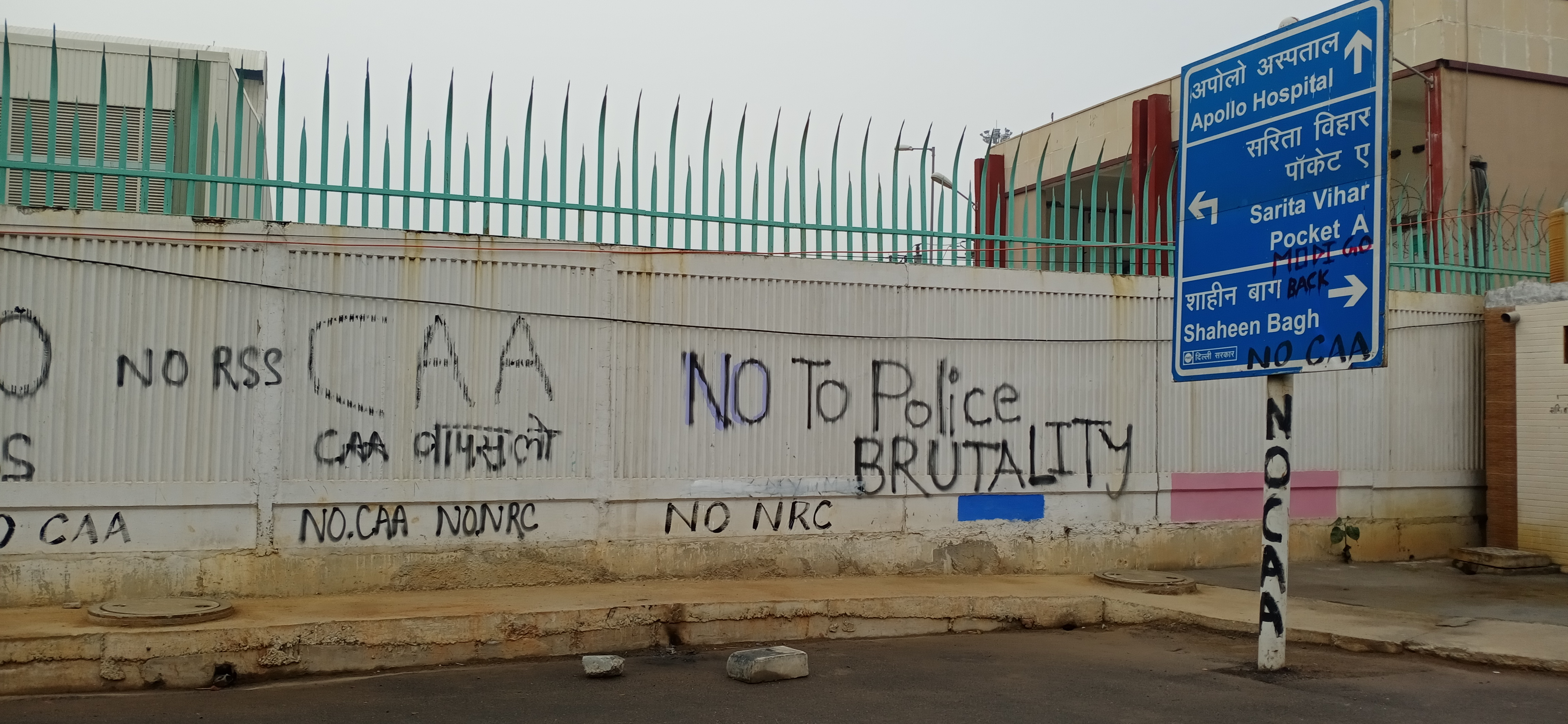
No to police brutality graffiti on a metro wall in New Delhi

In response to the police crackdown in Jamia Millia Islamia University and Aligarh Muslim University, protests were also joined by the students of the educational institutions of IIT Kanpur, IIT Madras, Jadavpur University, Tata Institute of Social Sciences, IISc, Pondicherry University, IIM Ahmedabad, as well as organisations such as Pinjra Tod and the Students' Federation of India. The students of Jadavpur University, West Bengal, called a protest gathering on 16 December, to "condemn the brutal state terror on the students of Jamia Millia Islamia University". At the event of IIT Kanpur, communal slogans were also raised by the protesters.

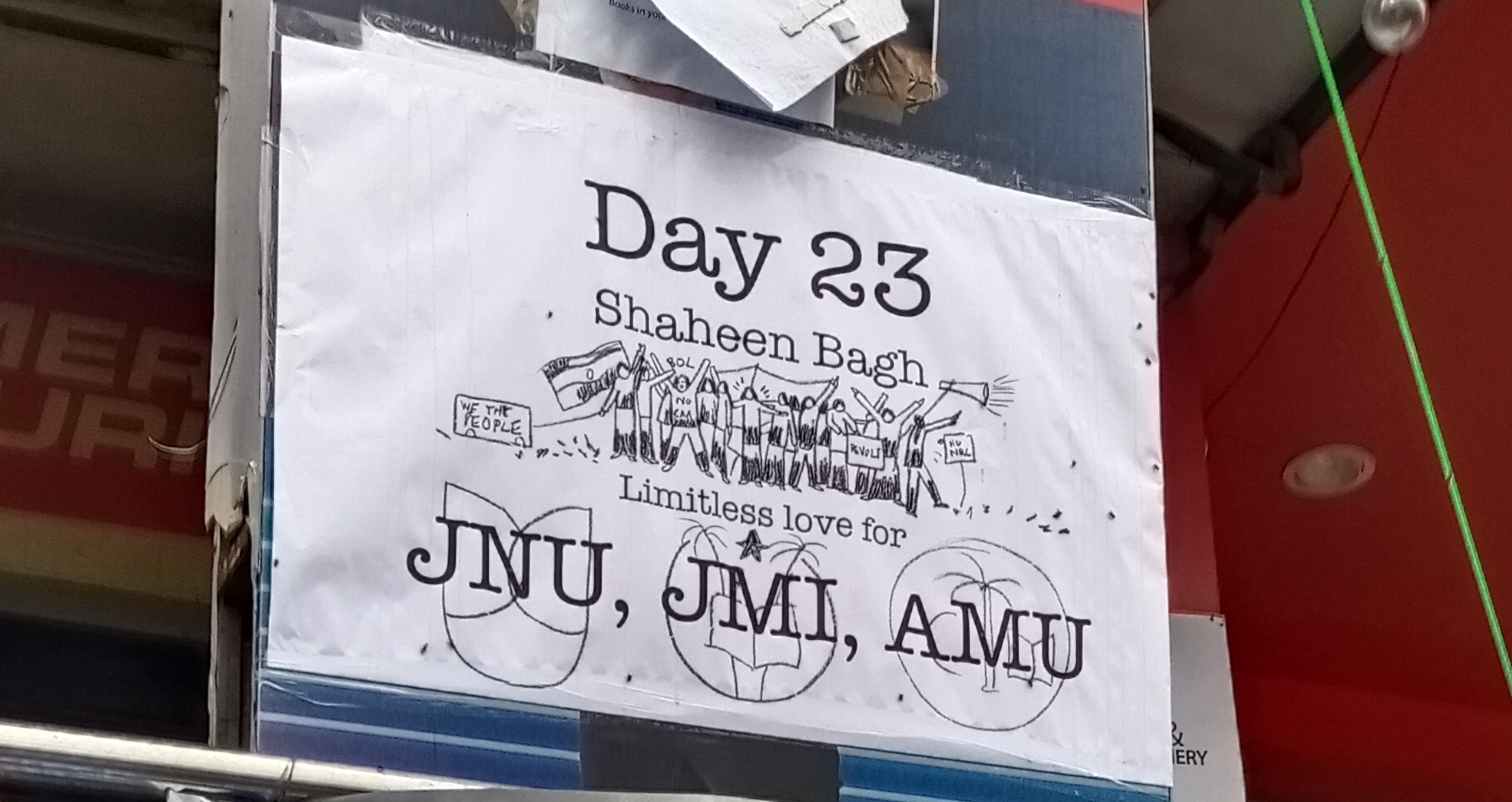
A placard on the 23rd day of protests at Shaheen Bagh; in solidarity with AMU JMI JNU, 8 January 2020 in New Delhi .

Aftermath

On 17 December, police arrested ten people (some of them having criminal history) in the case of the violent clashes in Jamia. None of the arrested were students of Jamia. On 13 January, several student groups protested outside the office of Vice-Chancellor asking to reschedule the exam dates, filing a case against Delhi Police and ensuring the safety of students. The VC announced in the afternoon, that a case will be filed against police on 14 January. On 15 January, the VC met Delhi police commissioner to discuss the violence and urged him to file an FIR. The Registrar of JMI filed a petition in a Delhi court for filing FIR on the violence at JMI. The court directed Delhi Police to submit by 16 March, a report on the actions taken on JMI administration's complaint.

==== Aligarh Muslim University ====
On 15 December, protests against CAA were held outside the campus of the Aligarh Muslim University. On the evening of 15 December, police officers forcefully entered the campus of the university and assaulted the students. At least 60 students were injured including the president of the students Union. The access to the internet was restricted in the area by the district administration. The university was closed from 15 December till 5 January 2020. A report by three activist-lawyers alleged that the police had resorted to "deceptive shelling", firing explosives camouflaged as tear gas shells during the crackdown. On the evening of 17 December, police released 26 people (including 8 students) on personal bonds. They had been arrested on charges of violence.

On 19 December, People's Union for Democratic Rights' fact-finding team consisting of activists Yogendra Yadav, Harsh Mander and Kavita Krishnan released a report on police crackdown at the Aligarh Muslim University. The report alleged that the police had called the students as terrorists and had used religiously charged slogans such as "Jai Shri Ram". The report also accused the police of breaking the protocols of the campus. It added that no bullet injury was reported. The report was prepared after visiting the campus, based on the video and audio clips of the incident, statements of the injured students and witnesses.

After a lull of four days, on 20 December, AMU campus again witnessed protests on Saturday with hundreds of AMU non-teaching staff joining hands with AMU teachers' association, protesting against the CAA and "police atrocities" against the agitators in various parts of the state. On 24 December 1000 – 1200 protesters were booked after organising a candle march inside Aligarh Muslim University for violating section 144. On 15 January, Aligarh Muslim University postponed all exams due to the ongoing CAA protests.

Aftermath

At 7 am on 16 January, Vice-Chancellor met the protesting students and expressed regret for calling police inside the AMU campus to handle the law and order situation inside campus. He defended his decision stating he had not thought that the police would enter the hostels. AMU had set up a fact-finding committee headed by Justice (retd.) V.K. Gupta for a detailed investigation of the events that occurred in the night of 15 December. The VC asked to students to cooperate with the fact-finding committee and the National Human Rights Commission (NHRC) team that was visiting the campus.

==== Nadwa College ====
On 16 December, around 300 students of Nadwa college, in Lucknow had planned a peaceful protest march against CAA and in solidarity with the students of AMU. The police prevented students from holding the march and forced them to return into the campus premises. The police locked the gates of the campus from outside and guarded it with a heavy deployment of police to prevent the students from coming out of the campus and undertaking the planned march. A clash between the police and the students locked inside the campus ensued and involved stone pelting from both sides. The police officers were seen hitting the students with sticks as in the video footage of the incident telecast on news channels.

Around 15 to 20 students were injured. 30 students were charged by the police for attempt to murder, rioting etc. The police accused the students of blocking the road and engaging in violence by throwing stones. While the students claimed that the police had attacked the unarmed students who were holding a peaceful protest. The student stated that they were neither involved in any violence, nor did they block any roads and yet they were charged with batons. After the incident the college was shut down until 5 January, and the students were asked to leave the campus.

==== Jawaharlal Nehru University ====
On 5 January, at 6:30pm, a masked mob consisting of more than 60–100 people armed with rods and sticks attacked the campus of Jawaharlal Nehru University, Delhi. The assault and vandalism lasted for 3 hours, where the mob chanted slogans exclaiming the victims to be "naxalites" and "anti-national". The mob assaulted journalists and social activist, Yogendra Yadav in the presence of media and police, who attempted to enter the campus on receiving news of the incident. The mob also punctured the tires of ambulances attending to the victims of the assault which had left more than 42 students and teachers as severely injured. Street lights were shut off by authorities during the incident. Students of the campus including the JNUSU president, Aishe Ghosh who was brutally attacked on head and was hospitalised, alleged the police of intentional inaction as police were informed before the assault about unknown groups entering in the campus. Around 30 students who were members of the left wing groups were injured along with 12 teachers. Visually impaired students were also not spared from assault. The students and left wing organisations accused the members of the BJP's student wing, Akhil Bharatiya Vidyarthi Parishad of orchestrating the attacks, while ABVP accused the left wing organisations. Professors who tried to intervene and save the students were also attacked. The policemen inside the campus allegedly did nothing to stop the mob. The assault was orchestrated through a WhatsApp group called "Unity against Left" which were traced through messages from members of the ABVP in the group. Students in Mumbai, launched a protest called "Occupy Gateway" late at night to protest against the assault. As a reaction to the assault, protests occurred across the country and in several cities.

=== Delhi ===
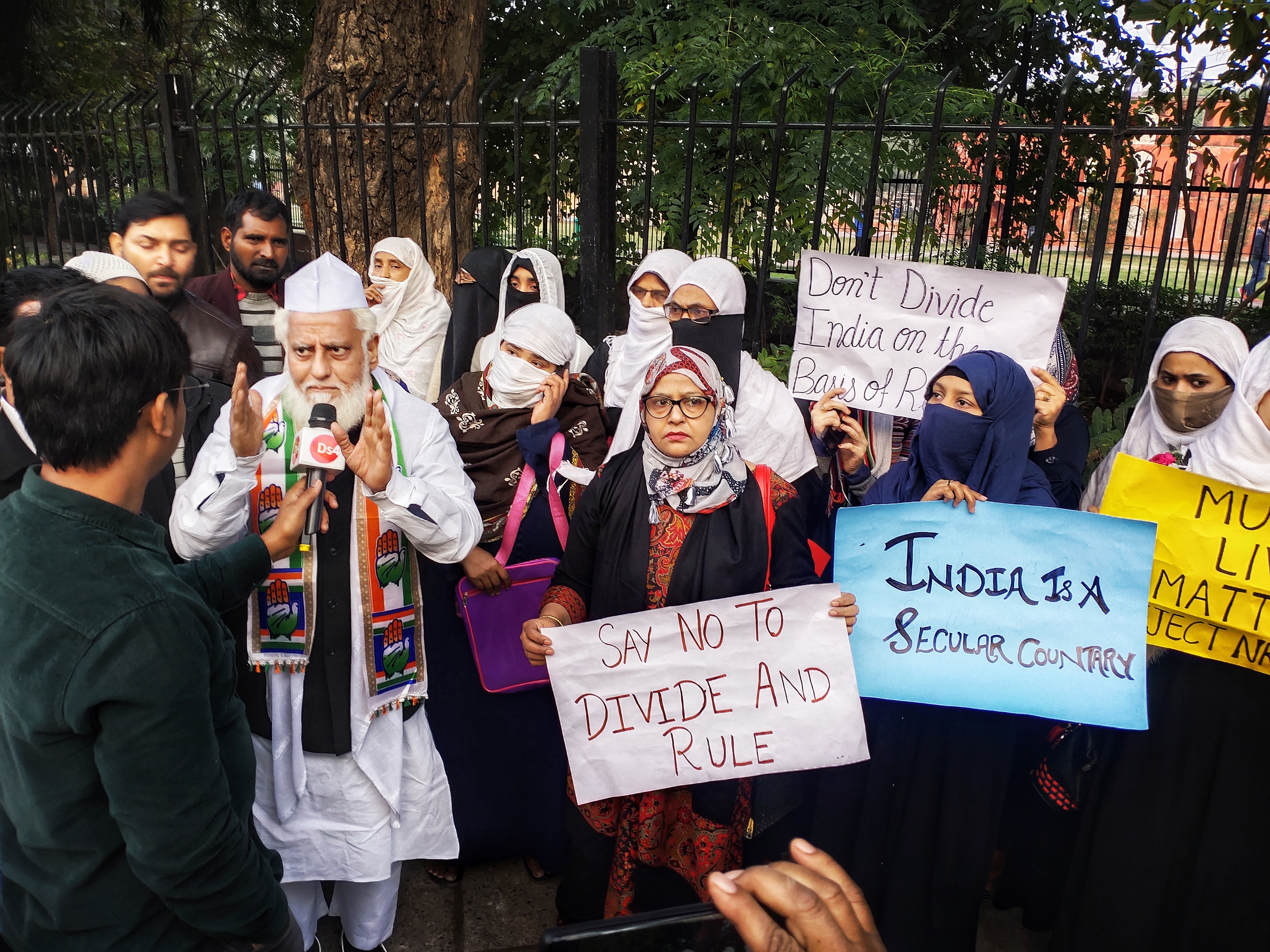
Locals in New Delhi protest against CAA

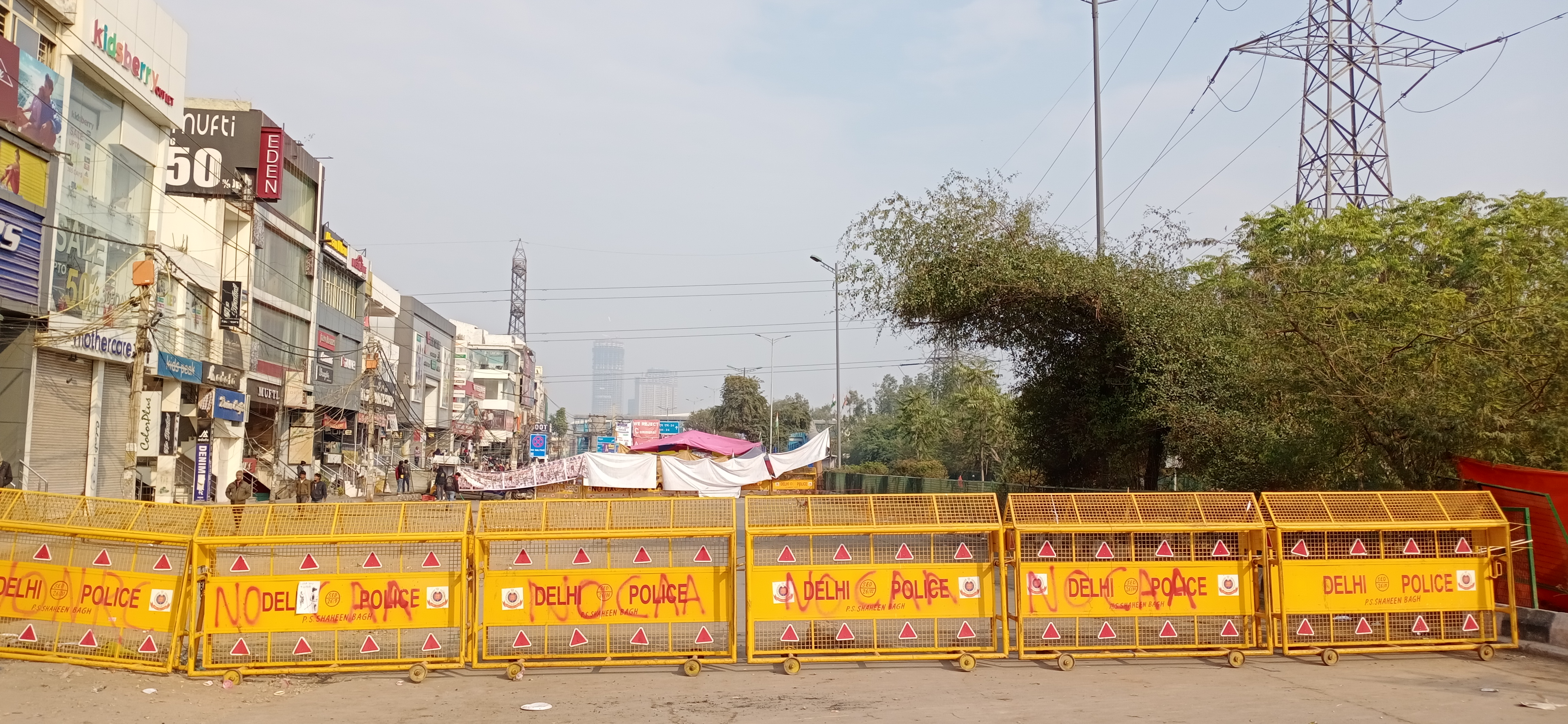
A major road in New Delhi has been blocked by anti CAA protests for over three weeks in the Shaheen Bagh protests. (pic taken on 7 January 2020).

On 14 December 2019, thousands of agitators packed into Jantar Mantar Road, filling up a space estimated to be half the size of a football ground, as multiple demonstrations occurred against the CAA in Delhi. The next day in Delhi near New Friends Colony, three Delhi Transport Corporation buses were torched. On 16 December, Priyanka Gandhi led a silent protest at the India Gate along with about three hundred congress workers to show solidarity with the students of Jamia Millia Islamia. On 17 December 2019, Delhi's Seelampur area had stone-throwing crowds face off against the police. The police retaliated with tear gas and batons, in which, according to local reports, several protesters and officers were injured. There were also reports of a police station being set on fire. According to police, buses were vandalised in the area.

On 19 December 2019, the administrative authorities imposed a ban against public gatherings in parts of Delhi. 20 metro stations were closed to prevent the movement for protests. At least 700 flights were delayed and more than 20 cancelled due to traffic jams caused by police closing the roads to stifle protests. Protest meetings were held defying the ban in Red Fort and Mandi House. Access to the mobile internet was restricted in certain places in Delhi. Digital rights activists, who accessed and studied the order suspending internet in several areas in Delhi on 19 December, stated that it was not issued from the "right channels" and, therefore, was "illegal". Politicians Yogendra Yadav, Sitaram Yechury, Nilotpal Basu, Brinda Karat, Ajay Maken, Brinda Karat, Prakash Karat, Sandeep Dikshit, Umar Khalid and D. Raja along with around 1,200 protesters were detained by the police.

On 20 December 2019, two Delhi Metro stations – Jamia Millia Islamia and Jasola Vihar Shaheen Bagh were closed. Amid nationwide crackdown because of CAA, Bhim Army Chief Chandrashekhar Azad's permission for the march from Jama Masjid to Jantar Mantar had been denied by Delhi Police. In spite of the denial of permission and the imposition of Section 144, a protest march was held where Azad was able to escape after being detained by the police. The protests were peaceful throughout the day, but in the evening a car was torched in Daryaganj after which the police attacked the protesters with water cannons and lathi charge. On the aftermath, Chandrashekhar Azad accused the Rashtriya Swayamsevak Sangh of being responsible for the violence and sought for the resignation of the Union Home Minister, Amit Shah. On 21 December, Chandrashekhar Azad was arrested along with 27 people and three FIRs were registered for the violent incidents on 20 December at Delhi Gate and Seemapuri. On 10 January 12 of those arrested were released on bail. On 15 January, a Delhi court granted bail and released Chandrashekhar Azad aka "Raavan".

However, when presented in the Delhi Tis Hazari court on 14 January 2020, the court questioned the public prosecutor about what is wrong with protesting since many people who protested in past are sitting chairpersons in the present government.

Protests were conducted by the journalists against the police brutality on the journalists covering the Anti-CAA protests especially in the states of Delhi, Uttar Pradesh and Karnataka. In the protests, Sitaram Yechury stated that only the states ruled by the Bharatiya Janata Party were experiencing violence. He further added that the other states were peaceful and hinted that the differences between the situation in the states show the who were encouraging violence.

On 23 December 2019, protests were held at multiple locations. 93 other students protesting outside Assam Bhawan and demanding the release of RTI activist Akhil Gogoi were detained by the police. The students alleged that the police used violence on the protesters.

On 24 December 2019, Police imposed a ban on gatherings in central Delhi's Mandi House near the Lutyens' Zone to prevent the protest march of students from multiple universities. The anti CAA-NRC protest march was to start from Mandi House to Jantar Mantar. On 27 December, the Delhi Police used facial recognition software by recording a video of the protester and checking it with the database of criminals maintained by them.

On 14 January, Supreme Court lawyers conducted a protest march from the Supreme Court to Jantar Mantar to protest against the CAA, NRC and NPR. On 19 January, in Delhi, hundreds of protesters joined a protest march holding lighted candles from Jamia University to Shaheen Bagh. Some of the protesters had dressed up as Mahatma Gandhi, BR Ambedkar and other revolutionaries of the Indian Independence movement. A model of detention camp was also paraded in the march.

==== North East Delhi riots ====
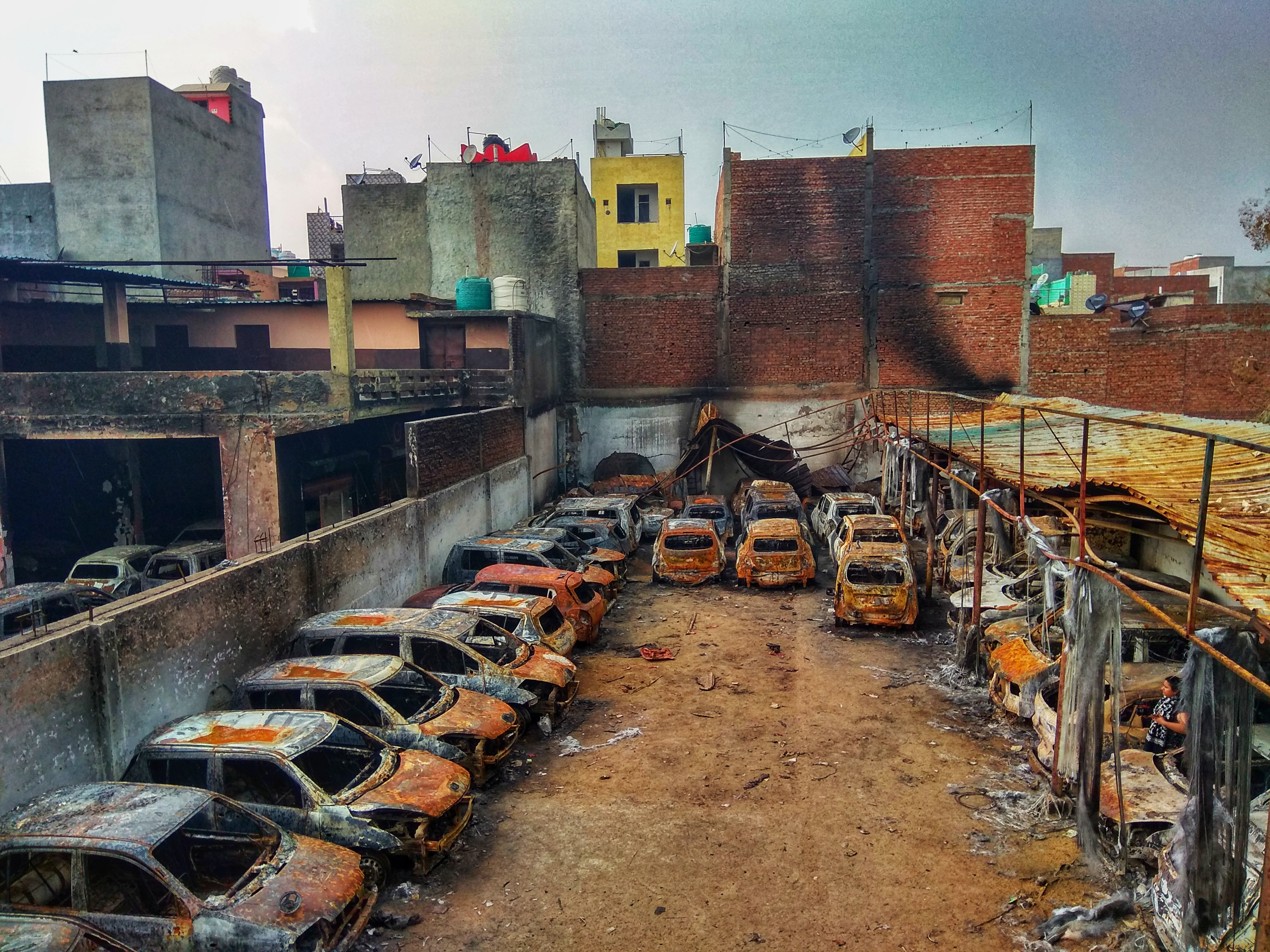
Many Cars burnt by Mob in Shiv Vihar

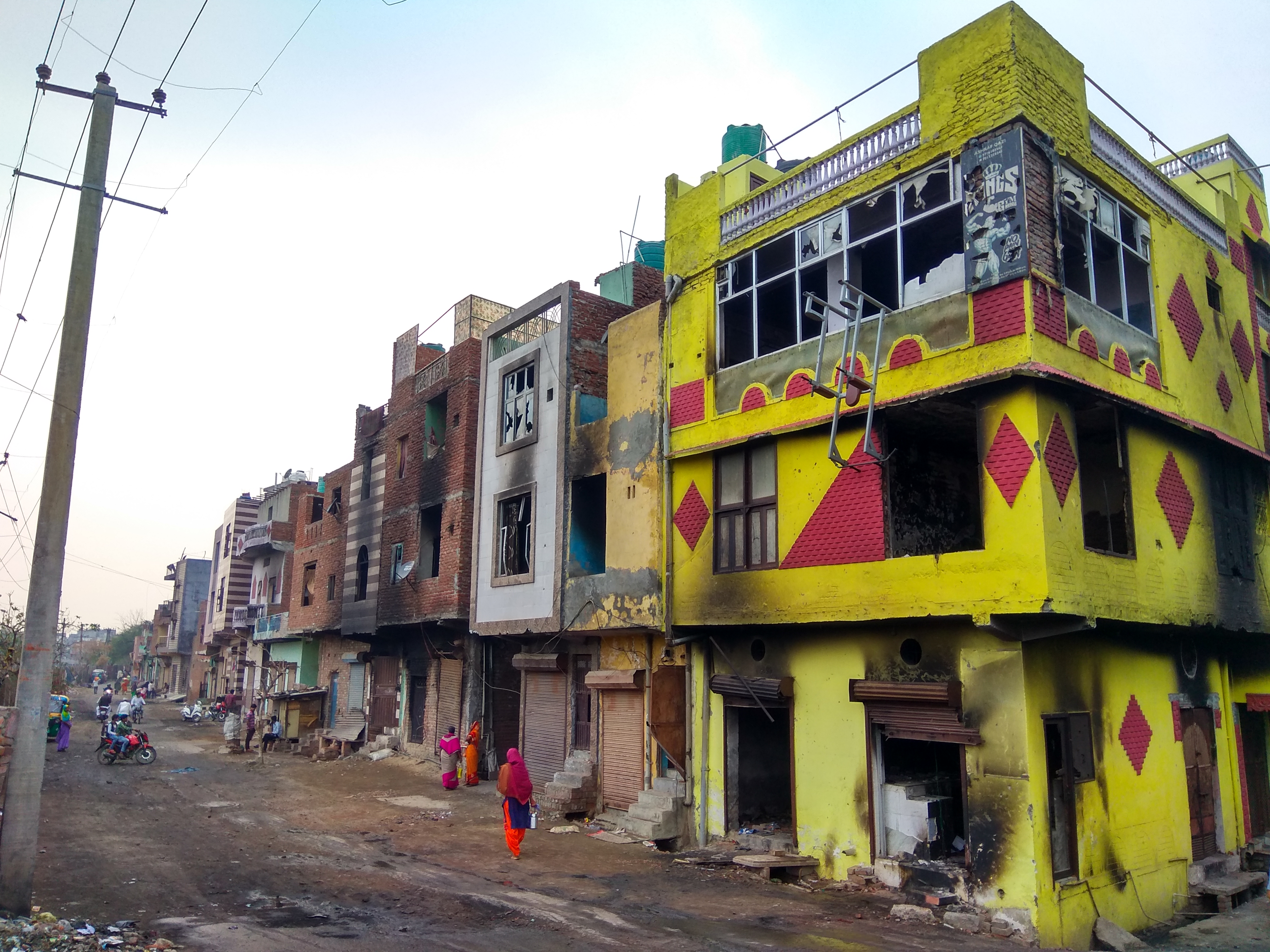
The burnt Gym at Shiv Vihar.

On 24 February, violent clashes occurred at Jaffrabad and Maujpur in which one police officer and a protester were killed. The pro-CAA demonstrators indulged in stone pelting with the anti-CAA protesters and vandalised houses, vehicles and shops. The police personnel used tear gas and lathicharge against the protestors. Later, it was reported that four protestors also died during the violence. The Ministry of Home Affairs stated that the violence appeared orchestrated because of U.S. President Donald Trump's visit to India.

On 26 February, The United States Commission on International Religious Freedom (USCIRF) condemned the violence in New Delhi. USCIRF Chair Tony Perkins said, "We urge the Indian government to make serious efforts to protect Muslims and others targeted by mob violence."

The Organization of Islamic Cooperation (OIC) has also condemned the New Delhi violence. It stated that steps must be taken to prevent the incidents of "Islamophobia" in the country. The OIC statement further went on to add that it "condemns the recent and alarming violence against Muslims in India, resulting in the death and injury of innocent people and the arson and vandalism of mosques and Muslim-owned properties."

The Government of India (GOI) has reacted by describing the criticism from the OIC as "inaccurate, selective, and misleading." The GOI also described USCIRF's criticism as "factually inaccurate and misleading, and appear to be aimed at politicising the issue."

==== Shaheen Bagh ====
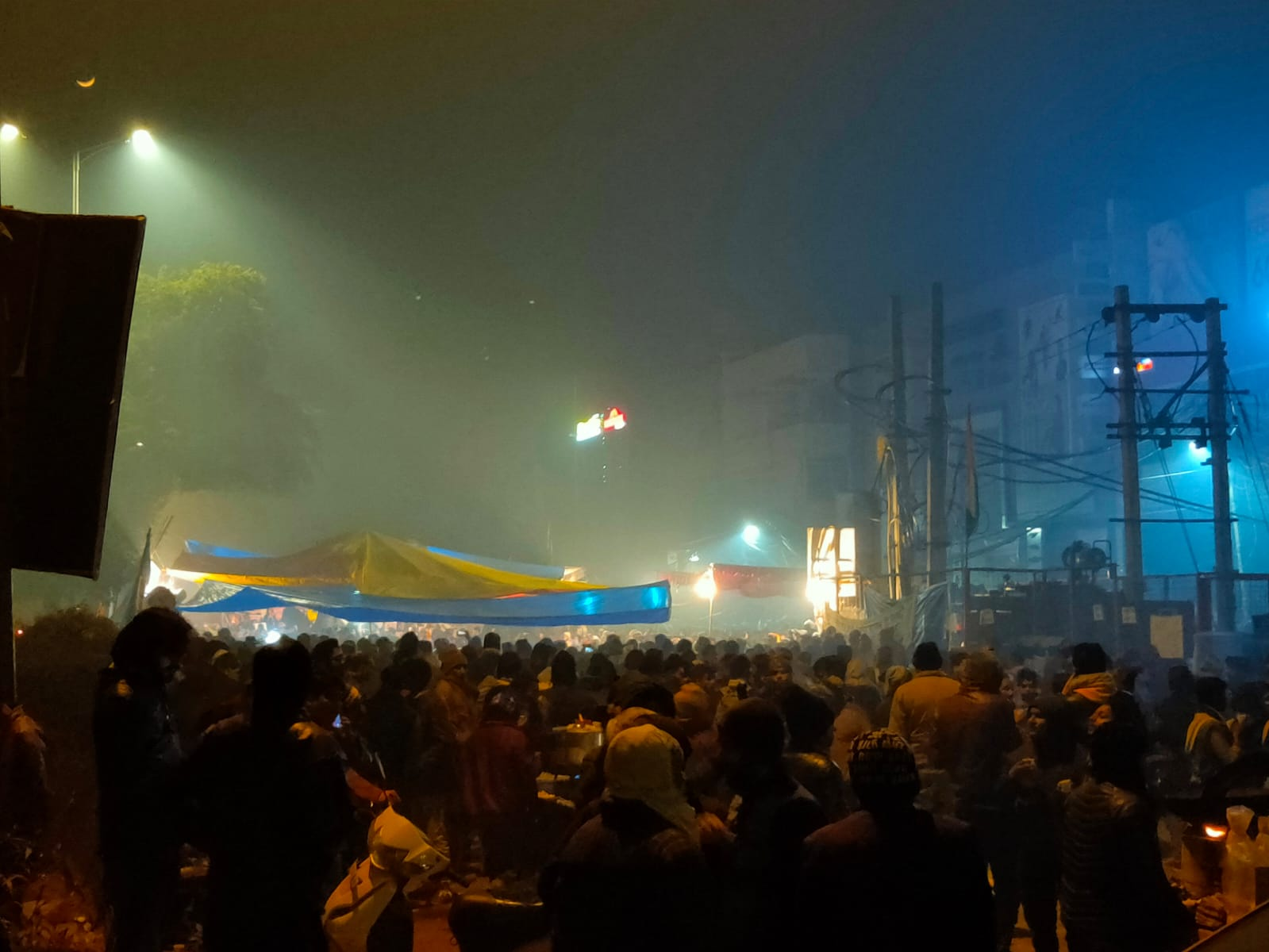
Shaheen Bagh on New Year's Eve.

Since 14 December, a continuous 24/7 sit in protest is being conducted. The protest began in the afternoon of 14 December with just 15 local women, and went on to gather thousands of protesters with crowds reaching as high as 100,000 on Sundays. On New Year's Eve, thousands of protesters camping at the site sung the Indian national anthem. They were joined in by celebrities and activists on 31 December. But in a turn of events, the protest took a turn for the worse when anti India slogans were shouted at Shaheen Bagh with reference to Jinnah and a call out to try and break India (Jinnah wali Azadi), where many miscreants with their own agenda had joined. The day was also recorded to have been the coldest in Delhi in the past 100 years. On 10 January, the Delhi High Court rejected a plea to shift the Shaheen Bagh protesters. The area has been covered with protest artwork.

=== West Bengal ===
On Saturday, 14 December 2019, violent protests occurred in West Bengal as the protesters attacked railway stations and public buses. Five trains were set on fire by the protesters in Lalgola and Krishnapur railway stations in Murshidabad district; railway tracks were also damaged in Suti.

On Monday, 16 December 2019, tens of thousands of people joined a protest march led by Chief Minister Mamata Banerjee and her ruling Trinamool Congress party. Mamata Banerjee stated that the NRC and CAA would not be implemented in West Bengal state as long as she was alive. She appealed people not to resort to violence, while accusing people from outside the state and members of the BJP of engaging in arson.

On Tuesday, 17 December 2019, protests that included road and rail blockades continued in parts of West Bengal including the districts of South 24 Parganas, North 24 Parganas and Nadia.

On 19 December 2019, a crowd with thousands of protesters gathered at Moulali in central Kolkata to peacefully object CAA and NRC. Mamata Banerjee held a second rally in Kolkata and stated that the Central Government was trying to project the CAA Protests as though it was a Hindu vs Muslim fight. She also stated that "BJP is buying skull caps for its cadres who are wearing them while vandalising properties to malign a particular community,". Earlier, on 18 December, a young BJP worker along with five associates, wearing lungi and skullcap were seen by the local residents throwing stones on a train engine. The arsonists were caught by the locals who handed them to the Murshidabad police.

On 21 December 2019, a protest march that the police estimated to be of 10,000 people was held in Kolkata from Shahid Minar till Mahajati Sadan.

Between 13 and 17 December 2019, multiple incidents of violence were reported during the protests. According to the police, as of 21 December, more than 600 people had been arrested for allegedly being involved in the violence.

On 23 December 2019, Governor Jagdeep Dhankhar was stopped by the students at Jadavpur University, from attending the university convocation ceremony. The vice-president of the BJP West Bengal unit raised questions that why the Muslims were excluded from the amendment if it was not about religion.

On 24 December 2019, Chief Minister Mamata Banerjee lead a protest march in Kolkata from Swami Vivekananda statue at Bidhan Sarani. She accused PM Narendra Modi and Union Home Minister Amit Shah of making contradictory statements. She stated "The prime minister is saying there has been no discussion or proposal on NRC. But a few days ago, BJP president and Union Home Minister Amit Shah had said NRC exercise would be carried out across the country. Both the statements are contradictory. We wonder who is speaking the truth. They are trying to create confusion,".

On 3 January, the radical Islamic organisation Popular Front of India (PFI) had planned an anti CAA protest for 5 January, but the West Bengal police denied permission for it. Since 7 January, women had been conducting a sit in protest at the grounds of Park Circus in Kolkata.

On 11 January, PM Modi visited Kolkata on a two-day official visit. Hundreds of people protested against CAA at the Kolkata airport. Several parties and student unions launched a protest at the Dorina Crossing at Esplanade in Kolkata. SFI leader stated that the protests would continue till Sunday, until PM Modi (who had been visiting the city) was in Kolkata.

On 22 January, a 5 kilometre long procession against CAA was led by CM Mamta Bannerjee in Darjeeling, West Bengal. The participants wore ethnic dresses and also played musical instruments. The participants chanted anti CAA slogans and carried banners and posters.

On 26 January (Republic Day), thousands formed parallel 11 km long human chains from Shyambazar to Golpark in Kolkata.

=== Punjab ===
Protests begun in Malerkotta, Patiala and Ludhiana with the support of Khalsa Aid, Alliance of Sikh Organisations and various Dalit organisations. By 17 December, protests were being held in Amritsar, Malerkotla, Machhiwara, Bathinda and Ludhiana. Students of Panjab University, Punjabi University and Central University of Punjab took a leading role in the protests backed by the Association of Democratic Rights. Razia Sultana, the only Muslim MLA and a Minister of the Punjab Cabinet organised a large protest in Malerkotla.

A cabinet meeting in Punjab decided to proceed as per the decision of the state assembly. A statement was released stating, "The ministers also expressed concern over the implications of the blatantly unconstitutional and divisive CAA, NRC and NPR," They also expressed concern on the violence over CAA stating, the issue "threatened to rip apart the secular fabric of the nation".

=== Uttar Pradesh ===
Protests were held in Aligarh, Kanpur, Bareilly, Varanasi and Lucknow. Banaras Hindu University students also protested the police action targeting AMU and Jamia students. However, they also held a rally in support of the CAA and NRC. On 19 December, the administration banned public assembly all over the state to prevent further protests in the state. Access to the internet was restricted in Azamgarh district for 2 days, after protest continued for 2 days in the area. In Lucknow, several buses, cars, media vans and motorbikes were torched. Uttar Pradesh Chief Minister Yogi Adityanath stated that the authorities would seize the properties of those who indulge in violence in the state.

On 20 December 2019, six protesters are killed in police firing in UP. According to the Press Trust of India, the death toll from Friday's protests in Uttar Pradesh's 13 districts has risen to 11.

On 21 December 2019, violent protests along with alleged police brutality were reported from several districts across the state. Access to the internet was restricted. The number of fatalities in the state increased to 16. Multiple clashes causing injuries to several people were reported. According to the police, 263 policemen were injured, of which 57 were firearm injuries. NDTV later reported that they could only find one policeman with bullet wound and the police did not share the list of 57 policemen with bullet injuries. Police arrested 705 people in the state, with 102 arrested for making allegedly objectionable remarks or social media posts. According to the UP Police, as of 21 December, a total of 218 people had been arrested in Lucknow.

On 24 December, Uttar Pradesh Police stated that 21,500 people were charged in 15 FIRs for violent incidents in Kanpur. In Muzaffarnagar the government, sealed 67 shops. Chief Minister, Adityanath had threatened the protesters that his government would auction the properties of the rioters to recover the losses due to the damage made to the property.

On 26 December, In Sambhal, UP, the government sent notices to 26 people for their alleged involvement in damaging properties during protests and asked them to explain their position or pay for the loss due to damage of property. The losses to the property were assessed to be ₹11.66 lakh (US$12,000). Earlier, on 22 December, the UP government had created a panel to assess the damage to the property and to recover the losses by seizing the property of the alleged protesters. The social activists accused the government of intimidating the protesters.

On 28 December, the Indian Express reported that with 19 killed and 1,246 people arrested based on 372 FIRs lodged in the state, UP was the worst affected state with the biggest police crackdown in India. Even though the official figure of number of deaths so far in UP was 19, opposition parties claimed that the actual figure was higher. The UP police had maintained that the deaths of protesters were not the result of police firing, but later on they admitted that some deaths were indeed caused by the police but attributed those incidents to shots fired in self defence.

On 17 January in Lucknow, around 500 women along with their children started a sit in protest at 2 pm near the Clock Tower.(subscription required) The police tried to convince them to end the protest but the protesters refused to move. On the night of 18 January, Uttar Pradesh police cracked down on the CAA protesters and snatched their blankets, utensils and food items. The video of policemen carrying away the blankets was recorded and shared on social media. The conduct of UP police was criticised by the users and the phrase "KAMBALCHOR_UPPOLICE" (blanket thief UP Police) became the top trend on Twitter in India. The police responded saying that they had confiscated the blankets following due procedure. The protesters alleged that police also cut the electricity connection to the ground, locked the public toilet nearby and poured water on the bonfire in the winter night. The police had issued a prohibition on assembly in Lucknow, and stated that they will prosecute the protesters for violating it. On 21 January, police registered cases against 160 women for violation of the ban on assembly and protesting against CAA in Lucknow.

On 16 December, in response to the police crackdown at Jamia Millia University in Delhi and Aligarh Muslim University over the Citizenship Amendment Act, clashes between the police and protesters occurred in Dakshintola area of Mau, Uttar Pradesh. On 17 December, students of IIT Kanpur assembled in a peaceful protest against the CAA and to express solidarity with the students of Jamia Millia Islamia.

=== Karnataka ===
On 16 December, protests against the Citizenship Amendment Act (CAA) were held in various parts of Karnataka. In Mysore, hundreds of protestors marched on the street, raising slogans and took out bike rallies. The police imposed a ban on public assembly in Mysore.

In Bangalore, the IISc students organised silent protest in the campus in solidarity with the students of Delhi and other parts of India.

In Shimoga, former MLA K B Prasanna Kumar was leading the protests near Gandhi Park in the city. The police detained him alleging that the protests were turning violent. Protests also occurred in Bellary, Bidar, Gulbarga, Kodagu and Udupi. In Raichur protests were held after the announcement of the CAA, as the protestors had concerns that approximately 5,000 of the 20,000 Bangladeshi immigrants in the Sindhanur camp would get Indian citizenship.

On 21 January more than 300,000 people join an anti-CAA protest rally at Kalaburagi in Karnataka. The rally was held 13-acre Peer Bangali ground, where people waving national flags had occupied the ground and the nearby roads. Sitaram Yechury, general secretary of Communist Party of India (Marxist) and M. Mallikarjun Kharge, general secretary of the All-India Congress Committee, activists Swamy Agnivesh and former IAS officer Sasikanth Senthil gave speeches in the event. Yechury asked the people to conduct a peaceful civil disobedience movement with aim to defy the CAA, NPR, and NCR to "save the country from Prime Minister Narendra Modi and Home Minister Amit Shah".

==== Bangalore ====
On 19 December, hundreds of protesters, including historian Ramachandra Guha, were detained by the Bangalore Police from Town Hall. On 20 December, Karnataka High Court asked the state government to explain the prohibitions on the assembly in the state. On 23 December, over 100,000 protesters gathered around the town hall in Bangalore. On 4 January in Bangalore hundreds of protesters participated in a rally and accused Modi government of attempts to divide India on the basis of religion, and distracting people from the issues of economic slowdown and job losses in the country.

Respecting Section 144 of the Code of Criminal Procedure, in force in the city until the midnight of 21 December, around 60 students from the Indian Institute of Management Bangalore came out in turns at the campus gate and left blank placards and their footwear at the campus gate, letting their footwear represent them.

As of 14 January 2020, 82 separate protest occasions had taken place in the city. The number was observed to be the highest number of protests in a month in the city's history. The protests were primarily held in Town Hall and Freedom Park.

On 25 January, more than thousand women staged a sit in protest at Frazer Town in Bangalore for 48 hours.

==== Mangalore ====
According to India Today, on 19 December seven CCTV recorded the arrival of a mob near a Mangalore police station along with a tempo carrying gunny bags full of stones. They then made an organised attempt to attack a police station, block all roads to the station, stone the police personnel and steal firearms. This was followed by the police firing on the mob, killing two people. The family of the deceased stated that the police used excessive force and should have tried to disperse the crowd instead.

In Mangalore 38 protesters from Campus Front of India who were marching towards the Deputy commissioner residence were arrested by the police arrested on charges of blocking traffic on Balmatta Road. On 19 December, a curfew was imposed in Mangalore until 20 December, while protesters marched on the streets defying prohibitory orders. Two people died with gunshot wounds after police fired on the crowd. The police in riot gear then entered the Highland Hospital where the two people with gunshot wounds were brought. The police were accused of beating up patients and their relatives. The incident was caught on CCTV Cameras, in which the policemen were seen banging on the hospital's ICU doors.

Home Minister of Karnataka Basavaraj Bommai accused the people from Kerala for the violence in Mangalore. Karnataka Police restricted the entry of people from Kerala to Mangalore at the Thalappady state border and detained more than 50 people without identity cards. On 20 December, the mobile phones of several journalists in Mangalore (many from Kerala) were confiscated and the journalists were detained. The Chief Minister of Kerala, Pinarayi Vijayan who condemned the action as an attack on media freedom and intervened after which the journalists were released.

On 22 December, the Karnataka government announced a compensation of ₹10 lakh (US$11,000) each to the families of the two men killed in violent protests in Mangalore on 19 December. The compensation was later withheld and an enquiry was initiated on the killed men.

On 15 January, more than 200,000 people joined the anti-CAA protests in Mangalore, hundreds of whom came to the venue in boats carrying Indian flags. Activists Harsh Mander and Kannan Gopinathan gave speeches during the protests. An organiser said that they considered the CAA, an anti-constitutional law that will be affecting not just Muslims but all religions. The event ended peacefully with the singing of National anthem.

=== Tamil Nadu ===
On 16 December, protests against CAA were organised by Muslim organisations and political parties in Tirupathur district of Tamil Nadu. Effigies of Prime Minister Narendra Modi and Home Minister Amit Shah were burnt, after which more than a hundred people were detained by the police. Demonstrations protesting against the CAA and the attack on students in Delhi were also held by the students of Government Law College at Katpadi and Government Arts College in Tiruvannamalai.

On 20 December, actor Siddharth, singer T. M. Krishna and 600 others were detained for anti-CAA protests in Valluvar Kottam In Chennai. On 23 December Dravida Munnetra Kazhagam along with allied parties held a "mega rally" as an anti-CAA protest in Chennai. Protests were also continued to be held in various parts of Tamil Nadu including Salem and Krishnagiri.

In Chennai, eight anti-CAA activists, including five women, were arrested for drawing kolams criticising the CAA and NRC. Following their arrest, the opposition DMK officially supported the kolam protest, and anti-CAA and anti-NRC kolams were drawn outside the houses of its leaders and members.

On 16 January, police in Chennai banned all protests in the city for a period of 15 days. 5 women and 1 man (including a physically disabled person) were detained by the police for protesting against CAA.

=== Gujarat ===
On 16 December, around 50 people protesting outside the Indian Institute of Management Ahmedabad and CEPT University were detained by the Gujarat Police.

On 17 December, five students were arrested by the Gujarat police for allegedly creating a graffiti against Citizenship Act. According to the police, the students (all in their early twenties) of the Maharaja Sayajirao University's Fine Arts department had made a graffiti that said "no CAB Modi", but instead of the letter 'o' in the phrase the students made a 'swastika' sign. The graffiti was made at locations that included police headquarters, Kala Ghoda Circle, the Fatehgunj pavilion wall and the wall of a hostel near Rosary School. A police complaint was registered on 16 December for "using provocative and humiliating words to hurt sentiments of the people from one community and cause violence, and also damaging public property". The Police alleged that "They used slogans with certain symbols in their graffiti to intentionally hurt religious sentiments of a particular community and affect public peace and cause riots against members of a community. They also damaged public property." The police has already arrested five and two students who were absconding were being searched.

On 19 December 2019, peaceful protest march were carried out in several parts of Ahmedabad. The peaceful protest march in Shah-e-Alam's Roza area turned violent after police intervened to disperse the crowd. Police used tear gas to counter stone pelting while trying to disperse a crowd of 2000 protesters. Protest rallies and strikes were also organised in several cities of Gujarat.

On 19 December 2019, videos surfaced allegedly showing protestors attacking policemen in Ahmedabad and Banaskantha.

On 25 December 2019, many activists alleged that Nirma University in Ahmedabad tried to "intimidate" its students who took part in protests against the Citizenship (Amendment) Act and also advised their parents to "counsel" them. The SMS sent by the university to the protesting students' parents read thus: " It has come to our knowledge that your ward was involved in protest against recent issues. The Police and Intelligence Bureau-IB have taken details of your ward from us... This is also to inform you that if your ward continues to participate in the protest, the police might create a record against him."

On 15 January 2020, a petition was filed in Gujarat High Court asking for the court's intervention to allow the petitioners to hold Anti-CAA protests in Ahmedabad. The petitioners stated that police did not grant them permission for peaceful anti-CAA protests but granted permission to 62 programmes held by the BJP to support the CAA. The petitioners said that the administration keeps denying the permission to Anti-CAA protesters and called it a violation of fundamental rights of the citizens. The Court asked the police to decide timely on the protests application.

=== Kerala ===
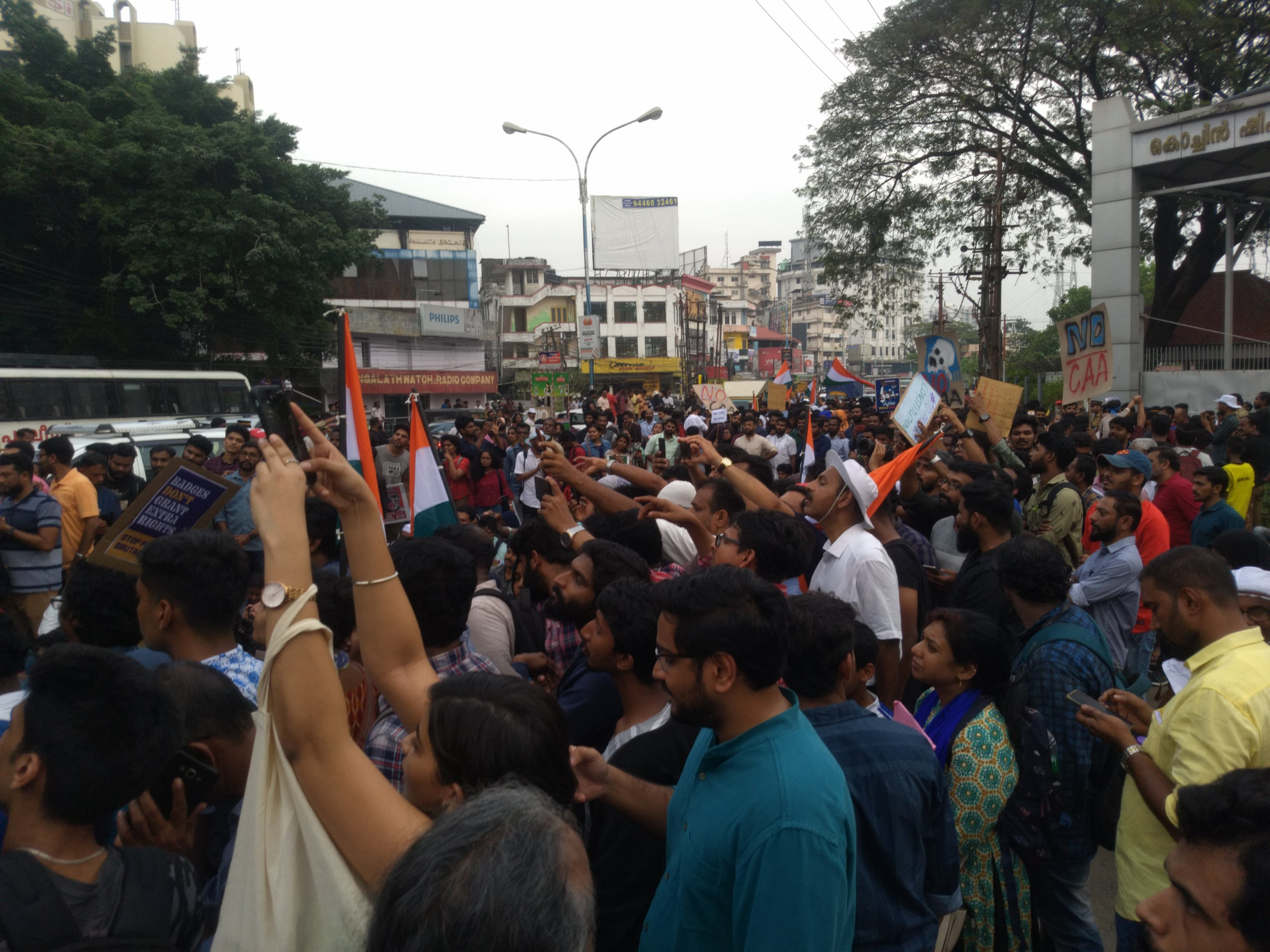
Protests at Ernakulam, c. 23 December 2019.

On 16 December, the ruling coalition, the Left Democratic Front (LDF), and the opposition coalition, the United Democratic Front (UDF), organised a joint hunger strike in the Thiruvananthapuram Martyr's Square. Chief Minister Pinarayi Vijayan stated that Kerala will "stand together to fight against the evil designs of the Modi government undermining the secular credentials of India", terming the Citizens Amendment Act "anti-constitutional and anti-people". Leader of the Opposition Ramesh Chennithala observed that another struggle for Independence is required to save the constitution from "fascist forces".

On 17 December, A dawn-to-dusk hartal (shutdown) was observed in Kerala by Welfare Party of India, Bahujan Samaj Party, Social Democratic Party of India and other 30 organisation against the Citizenship (Amendment) Act and the police violence against students at various universities across the country, in relation to anti-CAA protests. The Kerala police detained 233 people in connection with the hartal, including 55 people in Ernakulam, 51 in Thrissur and 35 in Idukki. In Palakkad 21 people have been detained, while 13 were detained in Kannur, 12 in Kottayam and 8 in Wayanad.

On 23 December, multiple protests in Kochi was organised and took place. People's long march, which started from Jawaharlal Nehru Stadium premises and ended near Cochin Shipyard. Cultural activists led another march from the Gandhi Square to Vasco De Gama Square at Fort Kochi. Another march led by CPI state secretary Kanam Rajendran was also held at the same time started from Kalamassery and ended in Rajendra Maidanam. On 24 December, Differently-abled Come together against CAA and NRC at Marine Drive, Kochi.

On 28 December, several delegates attending the Indian History Congress held at Kannur University protested during Kerala Governor Arif Mohammad Khan's speech. Some of them were detained by police, but were later released following an intervention by Kannur University.

On 31 December, Kerala Legislative Assembly passed a resolution demanding scrapping of the Act. On 1 January 2020 in Kochi, around half a million assembled in peaceful rally to protest against the CAA-NRC, held between Jawaharlal Nehru Stadium and Marine Drive.

On 14 January, the Kerala government approached Supreme Court to challenge the CAA under section 131 of the constitution and becomes the first state to do so. The article 131 of the Indian constitution provides Supreme Court the power to decide the disputes between the states and the Government of India. The Kerala government in its petition called the act "a violation of India's secular constitution" and accused the Indian government of dividing the country among religious lines. Kerala Chief Minister Pinarayi Vijayan said, "Kerala will always remain in the forefront of this fight to protect the Indian constitution and the fundamental rights of its citizens,". Vijayan added that Kerala will save the rights of the citizens from the unconstitutional CAA by fighting against it using constitutional methods.

On 26 January, to protest against the CAA and the proposed NRC the Left Democratic Front led by the Communist Party of India (Marxist) had organised the human chain. The chain was formed by approximately 6 to 7 million people and extended for a distance of 620 kilometres from Kasaragod to Kaliyikkavila.

=== Telangana ===
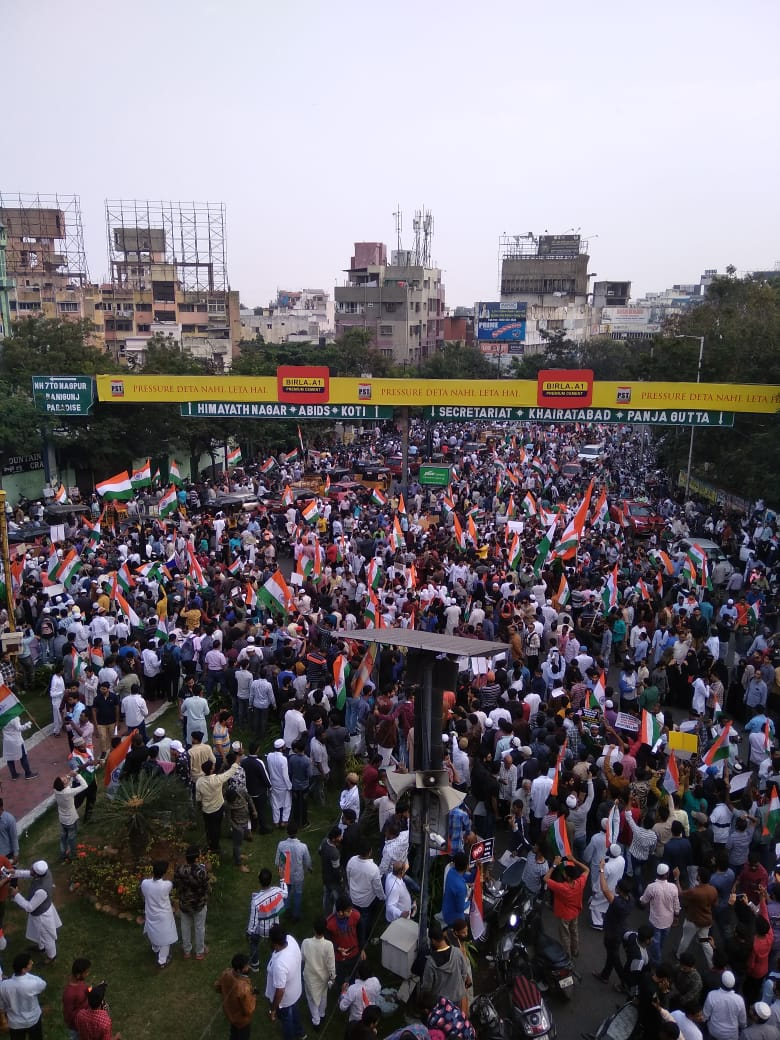
Million March, Hyderabad

On 16 December, thousands of students from major institutes in Hyderabad such as University of Hyderabad, Osmania University and MANU University participated in protests, demanding a rollback of the CAA. On 21 December, numerous protests took place across Hyderabad organised by students, NGOs and various political parties. The Hyderabad Police stated that the protests remained peaceful. Protesters demanded Chief Minister K. Chandrashekar Rao, whose party Telangana Rashtra Samithi had voted against the bill in parliament, to end his silence with respect to the CAA. By 23 December, it was reported that protests had spread to smaller towns, including Nizamabad.

On 4 January, more than 100,000 protesters attended the protest march named "Million March" in Hyderabad. The protesters displayed placards with slogans saying "Withdraw CAA immediately," and "India's only religion in secularism".

=== Bihar ===
On 17 December, posters describing Bihar Chief Minister Nitish Kumar as "missing" were erected as a form of protest in Patna. Nitish Kumar had been criticised for his silence over the CAA. while his party, Janata Dal (United), had supported the bill in both the Houses of Parliament as part of the alliance with the Bharatiya Janata Party. The JD(U) party strategist Prashant Kishor, party spokesperson Pavan Verma and MLC Gulam Rasool Balyawi had voiced dissatisfaction over the party's stance on CAA. On 19 December, Nitish Kumar declared that the NRC will not be implemented in the state, becoming the first major Bharatiya Janata Party ally to reject the controversial measure.

On 19 December, a bandh was called by communist parties in Bihar, supported by a number of small parties, where protesters blocked rail and road traffic in protest against CAA and the proposed countrywide implementation of NRC.

On Saturday, 21 December, a "Bihar bandh" was called by the Rashtriya Janata Dal (RJD), where bandh supporters reportedly blocked railway tracks in Araria and East Champaran districts. In Nawada, bandh supporters demonstrated on National Highway 31 where wheels were burned on the road and the movement of vehicles was disrupted, while in Vaishali, the highway was blocked with the help of buffaloes. In Patna, hundreds of party supporters with lathis entered the railway stations and bus stations with party flags, but were repulsed by policemen. At Darbhanga, RJD workers and supporters protested bare chest, sloganeering against Bihar chief minister Nitish Kumar and central government.

During a protest at Phulwari Sharif near Patna, some of the miscreants started pelting stones and a clash broke out between protesters and the supporters of the Act. A nearby temple and a cemetery were damaged in the clash. Eyewitnesses said police had used tear gas and water cannon to disperse the people. Police said that people of Hindu community fired bullets that injured nine Muslim men. During the stampede, an eighteen years old teenage protester Amir Hanzla ran towards the lanes of Sangat Mohalla, a neighbourhood that was a hub of RSS-affiliated right wing Hindutva members. His dead body was found a week after he was allegedly murdered by the Hindutva extremists. Police arrested six people accused in the case who belonged to Hindu Putra Sangathan, a Hindutva group. All of the suspects confessed their crimes and police is also investigating 18 other organisations related to this extremist group.

=== Maharashtra ===
On 19 December, different NGOs and college students, backed by Congress, Nationalist Congress Party and Left Democratic Front parties, jointly formed a front with the name "Hum Bharat Ke Log" and held a protest at the August Kranti Maidan. In Mumbai, several actors including Farhan Akhtar, Swara Bhaskar, Huma Qureshi, Raj Babbar, Sushant Singh, Javed Jaffrey, Aditi Rao Hydari, Parvathy Thiruvothu, Konkona Sen Sharma, Nandita Das, Arjun Mathur and filmmakers Anurag Kashyap, Rakeysh Omprakash Mehra, and Saeed Mirza joined in the protest venue. Mumbai police had deployed more than 2,500 policemen to monitor and control around 20,000 protesters. The peaceful protest concluded without any violent incidents. Mumbai police was praised by prominent artists including Farhan Akhtar, Swara Bhaskar, Kunal Kamra, politician Milind Deora and citizens for its professional conduct in maintaining law and order. Protests were held in other cities in the state such as Pune, Nashik, Malegaon, Kolhapur and Nagpur.

On 28 December, on the occasion of the foundation day of the party, the state unit of the Congress party in Mumbai undertook a flag march and used the slogan "Save Bharat-Save Constitution". The march started from the August Kranti Maidan and ended at the statue of Lokmanya Tilak near Girgaum Chowpatty. It was attended by office bearers and workers of the party. Similar marches were held in many parts of the country.

On the midnight of 6 January, students of IIT Bombay began a protest called "Occupy Gateway" in Mumbai in response to the attack on Jawaharlal Nehru University campus. They were joined in by hundreds of protesters, including activists Feroze Mithiborwala, Umar Khalid and comedian Kunal Kamra.

On 12 January, thousands of people joined the anti-CAA protests at Jogeshwari in Mumbai. Slogans such as "I Am From Gujarat, My Documents Burned in 2002", "No CAA, Boycott NRC, Stop Dividing India, Don't Divide us", "Save Constitution", were displayed on the banners. Large number of policemen were also deputed for security.

Inspired by the Shaheen Bagh protest, a massive anti-CAA-NRC-NPR protest started in Mumbai on 17 January. Around 10,000 women gathered at the YMCA Ground in Mumbai to protest in the evening. The protest was organised by a NGO named Mumbai Citizen Quorum.

A statewide shutdown, "Maharashtra Bandh" was organised by Vanchit Bahujan Aghadi (VBA) along with 35 other organisations across Maharashtra state, to protest against CAA and the economic policies of the BJP-led central government, which according to the organisers "were ruining the country". The activists of VBA forced shopkeepers to shut down their stores. A bus was damaged due to stone pelting. On 6 January, 50,000 women held an "all women's rally" in Malegaon to protest against the CAA, NRC and NPR. The rally was organised by Dastoor Bachao Committee and Shan-e-Hind, an affiliate of Janata Dal (Secular).

On 1 February, thousands gathered for the pride parade, Queer Azaadi Mumbai at August Kranti Maidan which joined in slogans against the CAA and NRC.

==== Pune ====
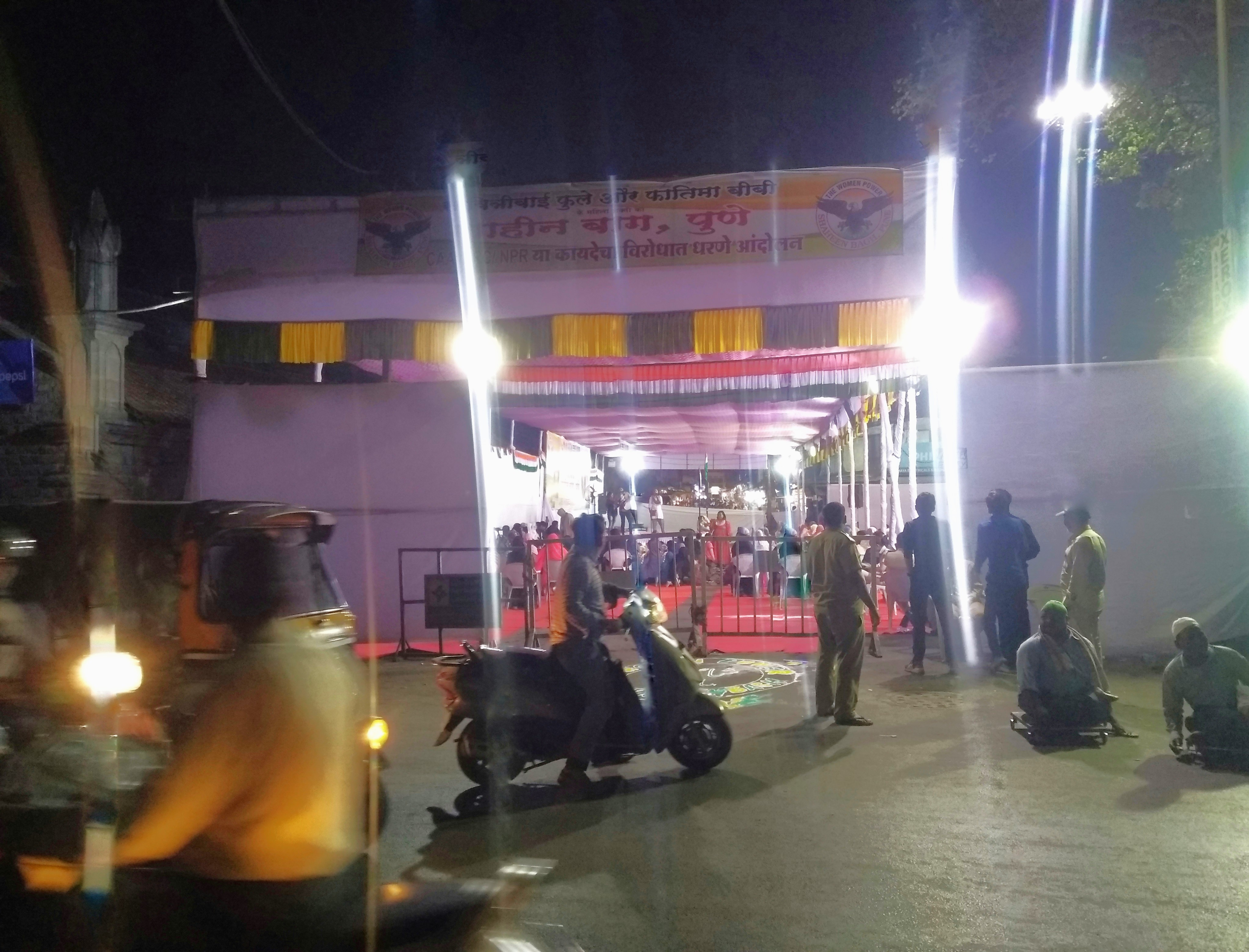
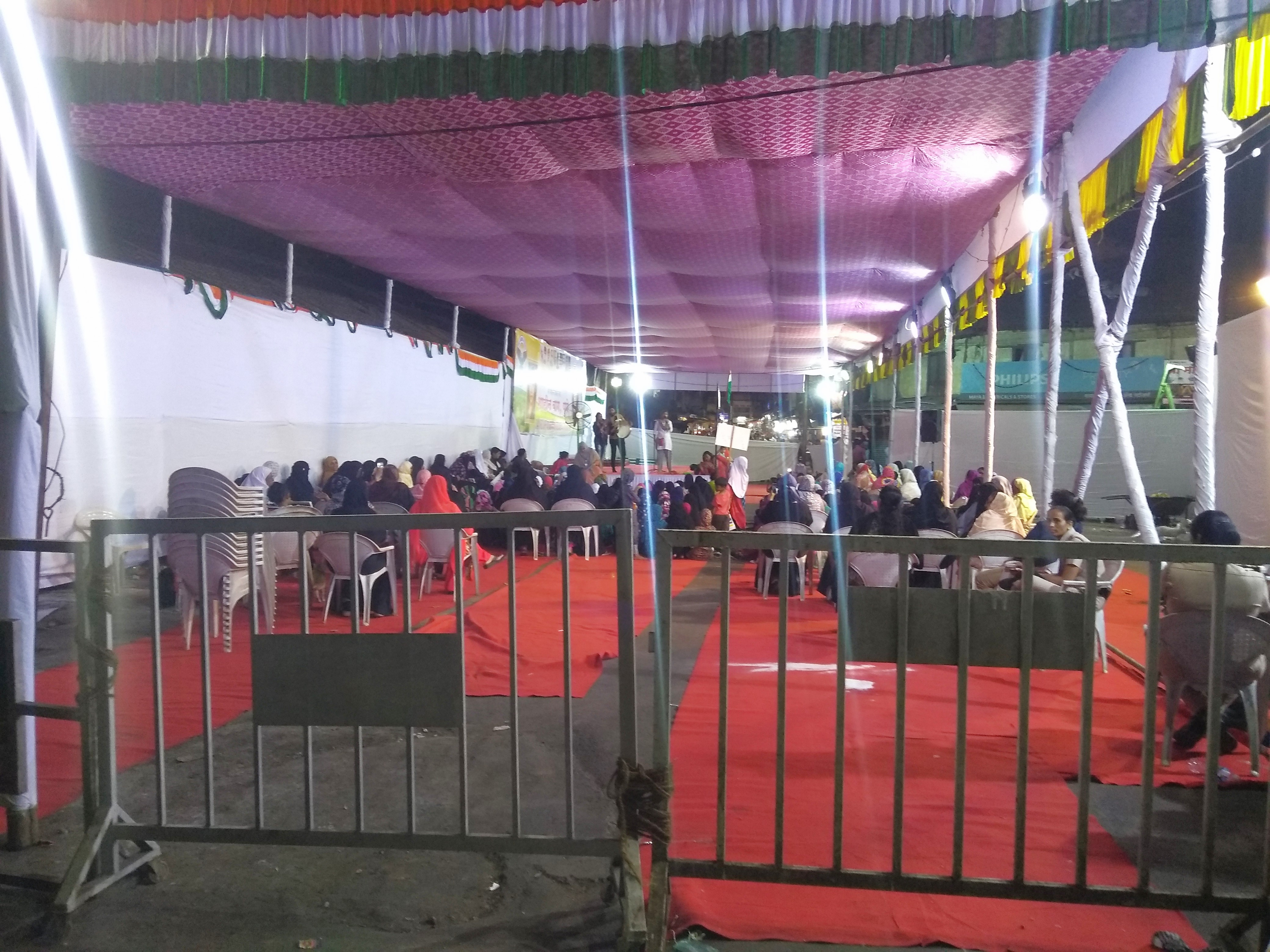
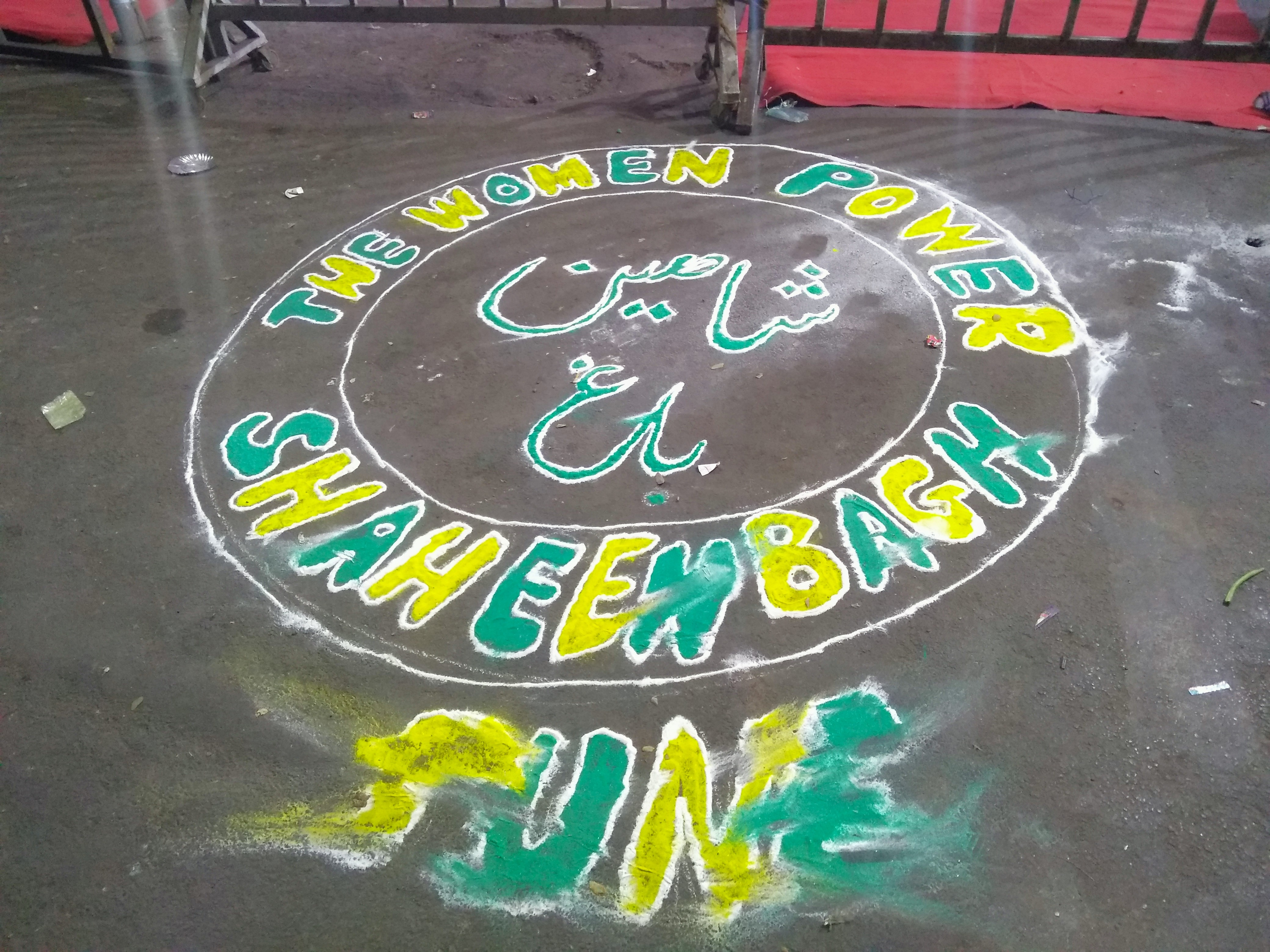
Shaheen Bagh protests against CAA, NRC and NPR in Pune on 22 Jan 2020

On 11 January, an all women sit in protest was started outside Konark Mall in Kondhwa, in Pune, organised by Kul Jamaat-e-Tanzeem, an umbrella body of several organisations. the protests started with fewer people participating but the crowd grew steadily and reached around 500–600 protesters as reported on 19 January. According to a protester the movement was to save the constitution and the country. Candle light vigil, human chains and speeches were made as part of the protest. The venue had banners with slogans such as 'Tumhari Lathi Se Tej Hamari Awaaz Hai' and 'Liar Liar Desh on Fire', as well as 'India Needs Education, Jobs, Not CAA, NRC, NPR'. Shaheen Bagh-style protests against CAA, NPR and NRC were held over several days in Pune Camp.

==== Nagpur ====
In Nagpur, on 24 January, lawyers, doctors and professors conducted a rally. In the rally a high court judge, Ravi Shakar Bhure said that the judiciary had become helpless as well and termed the actions of the government to be part of a massive conspiracy.

=== Northeast India ===
The Citizenship Amendment Act (CAA) implementation has faced significant opposition in Northeast India, especially in Assam. Critics argue the CAA is discriminatory and undermines indigenous rights. The central government's decision to exclude most tribal areas from the CAA has been met with mixed reactions, as regions like Assam still largely fall outside the Sixth Schedule and are thus not exempted .

Assam, due to its porous borders with Bangladesh, has been particularly affected by illegal immigration, which heightens the controversy surrounding the CAA. Existing student bodies, such as the Northeast Student Union (NESU), have been criticized for their inaction on the issue. In response, the Wesean Student Federation(WSF) was formed in March 2024, advocating for international intervention and urging the United Nations to address the CAA's discriminatory aspects .

Calls for excluding the entire Northeast from the CAA's purview have been persistent, reflecting widespread regional discontent. In Assam, only areas under the Sixth Schedule, like the Bodoland Territorial Region, are exempt, leaving much of the state vulnerable to the CAA. This discrepancy has sparked questions about the state's policy consistency, as highlighted by All Assam Students Union Chief Advisor Samujjal Bhattacharya .

Efforts to grant Scheduled Tribe status to additional Assamese communities could potentially lead to a tribal-majority state fully exempt from the CAA, though this has not yet materialized. Meanwhile, organizations like the Asom Jatiyatabadi Yuba Chatra Parishad (AJYCP) are pushing for the implementation of an Inner Line Permit system to further protect against illegal immigration .

=== Other states and union territories ===
- Meghalaya: On 9 December, large scale protests were held in the state. Vehicles and buildings were vandalised in Shillong. Curfew and internet restrictions were imposed in several parts of the state. On 20 December, the internet restrictions were lifted after an order from Guwahati High Court while night curfews remained in place. The agitations continued in the state with the capital of Shillong being primarily affected. The agitations were led by student organisations with regular demonstrations taking place in universities like North East Hill University.
- Goa: On 13 December, Goa Forward Party chief, Vijai Sardesai, who dubbed the bill as "communal ammunition bill", took part in the protests in Margao. On 22 February, over 15,000 people gathered at a protest in the capital city Panaji, organised by the "Goa Alliance Against CAA-NRC-NPR" with support from the Goa Church.
- Chhattisgarh: On 15 December, a protest march was held under the banner of the "Anti-CAB Agitation Forum" from Marine Drive area to Ambedkar Chowk in Raipur in the evening.
- Odisha: On 16 December, thousands of protesters, including farmer leaders, student activists, Dalit leaders and people with disability, hit the road in Odisha against the CAA, NRC and the attack on Jamia students. They marched from Satyanagar Mosque towards the residence of Chief Minister Naveen Patnaik in Bhubaneswar. They also submitted a memorandum to the Chief Minister and Governor Ganeshi Lal. On 30 January, 25,000 protesters marched through central Bhubaneswar to protest against the CAA.
- Uttarakhand: On 16 December, protest marches were organised in Dehradun, Kashipur, Haridwar, Nainital and Udham Singh Nagar, Haldwani, districts opposing the law terming it discriminatory and unconstitutional.
- Chandigarh: On 19 December, over 700 students from Punjab University accompanied by students, activists and residents of surrounding districts like Ambala and Patiala conducted a protest march in city.
- Manipur: On 19 December, women vendors of Ima Market held a silent protest by closing down all their shops. Students also held protest rallies where a few minor scuffles broke out between them and security forces.
- Madhya Pradesh: On 20 December, protests reportedly turned violent in Jabalpur, leading to a curfew being imposed in four police station limits.
- Rajasthan: On 22 December, Chief Minister Ashok Gehlot led a protest march of nearly 300,000 people christened "Samvidhan Bachao rally" against CAA. The protestors stated that CAA was against the constitution and is an attempt to divide the people based on their religion. They demanded that the new law be repealed. The protest march was supported by several political parties including Congress, Aam Aadmi Party, Rashtriya Lok Dal and Janata Dal (Secular). On 24 December 200,000 people attended a protest in Kota. On 25 January, Rajasthan Assembly, with Congress in the majority, passed a resolution asking the central government to repeal CAA and also objected against the NPR and NRC.

=== Overseas ===
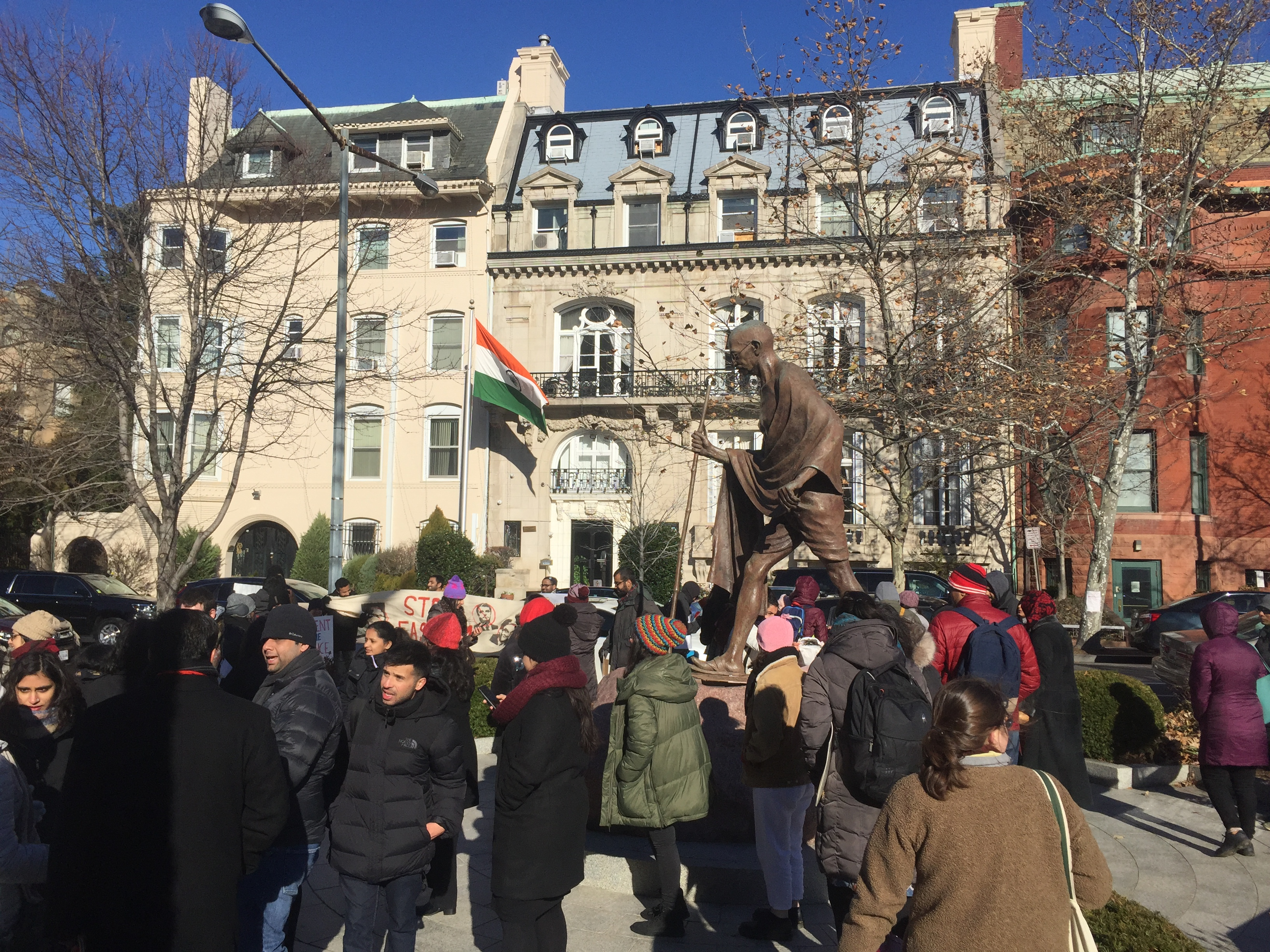
Protest at the Mahatma Gandhi Memorial in Washington D.C., c. 19 December 2019.

Various cities around the world, including New York City, Washington D. C., Paris, Berlin, Geneva, Barcelona, San Francisco, Tokyo, Helsinki, and Amsterdam, witnessed protests against the Act and the police brutality faced by Indian protesters.

North America

Protests were held in solidarity with Indian protesters outside the Mahatma Gandhi Memorial in Washington D. C. Protests were also held at Harvard University and Massachusetts Institute of Technology in the United States, where the students held demonstrations against the violent police crackdown in Jamia Milia Islamia. Around 100 students and faculty members of Columbia University tore up copies of the CAA and 150 others marched to the Indian consulate in Chicago to condemn the repressive behaviour of police against the students.

On 19 December, around 400 present students along with former students of Harvard University, Columbia University, Yale University, Stanford University, Brown University, Johns Hopkins University, Cornell University, Carnegie Mellon University, Purdue University, University of California and the Massachusetts Institute of Technology condemned the arbitrary use of power of policing and asked the Home Minister of India, Amit Shah to curb the brutality.

On 26 January 2020, the 71st Republic Day of India, protest held in 30 cities of the United States including cities which have Indian consulates like, New York, Chicago, Houston, Atlanta and San Francisco and in front of the Indian Embassy in Washington DC. Various organisations including Indian American Muslim Council (IAMC), Equality Labs, Black Lives Matter (BLM), Jewish Voice for Peace (JVP) and Hindus for Human Rights (HfHR) participated in the protest.

Europe

The first anti-CAA protests in Europe were held outside the High Commission of India in London, on 14 December 2019. On 16 December, students at University of Edinburgh in the United Kingdom demonstrated their protest against the Act. The university and College Union, Edinburgh had released a statement in solidarity condemning the brutal inflictions exercised by state police on the students of various universities in the country who were protesting against the Act.

On 20 December 2019, students from various universities in the Netherlands protested against the Act and the National Register of Citizens in front of the Indian Embassy at The Hague. Around 300 students from University of Leiden, University of Groningen, and Erasmus University assembled in a peaceful protest by reading the Preamble to the Constitution of India and anti-CAA slogans. Till date, four protests were held in front of the embassy by the Indian diaspora living in the Netherlands.

Protests were also held in Berlin, Germany and Zurich, Switzerland with Berlin even seeing a protest march from the Brandenburg Gate till the Indian embassy.

On 21 December 2019, around a hundred students and professionals of Indian origin living in Munich, Germany gathered at the memorial to the White Rose Movement outside LMU Munich and protested against the CAA, NRC, and the police action against the students of Jamia Millia Islamia and Aligarh Muslim University.

Diverse voices from France too, joined in for anti-CAA, anti-NRC protests. A letter of solidarity with protests in India and condemning the citizenship legislation, signed by hundreds of students and other professionals including eminent writers like Shumona Sinha, Amit Chaudhuri, musicians- Jean-Philippe Rykiel, Prabhu Edouard et al. preceded a planned mass protest gathering. On 4 January 2020, peaceful and song-filled protests by students, educationists and others from the Indian and foreign diaspora were held at Parvis du Trocadéro in Paris and also in front of the Indian Embassy, Paris despite facing the irk of some local BJP supporters.

On 14 January, more than 500 people gathered outside the Indian embassy in London to protest against the CAA. In Berlin, Germany more than 200 people join the protest march against CAA, NRC, JNU attack on 19 January. The march was led by the Indian diaspora and started at the Brandenburg Gate and ended at the Indian Embassy.

On 20 January, several Labour MPs of the UK parliament discussed the concerns on the CAA, in a meeting organised by South Asia Solidarity Group (SASG) and Ambedkar International Mission (UK) in London. The MPs expressed concern on its implications on human rights and disenfranchisement of Muslims.

On 25 January, in London, around 2000 of people from the Indian diaspora and the Human Rights organisation, conducted a protest march against CAA from the Downing street to the Indian High Commission. The protesters demanded the repeal of the CAA stating that it impacts the secular constitution of India. The protesters carried banners with slogans such as "Protect the Constitution", "Stop Dividing India", "United Against Racism in India" and "No Citizenship on the Basis of Religion". The protester also asked for the abolishing the NPR and NRC which could be used along with the CAA for a mass disenfranchisement of Muslims in India.

During the march, MP Sam Tarry, from the UK Opposition Labour Party while addressing the crowd, stated "We are not here as any anti-India demonstration, we are here as a pro-India demonstration. It is incredibly important that our voices are heard against laws that are not good for the future of the country," he added that the human rights in any country is an international issue. Labour MPs Stephen Timms, Clive Lewis and Nadia Whittome supported the protest with written messages and asked the UK government to discuss it with the Indian government. Some of the groups backing the march were Indian Workers Association (GB), School of Oriental and African Studies (SOAS) India Society, CasteWatch UK, Tamil People in the UK, Indian Muslim Federation(UK), Federation of Redbridge Muslim Organisations (FORMO), Kashmir Solidarity Movement, South Asian Students Against Fascism.

A five-page resolution against the CAA was drafted by more than 150 members of the European Union, who stated that it "marks a dangerous shift in the way citizenship will be determined in India and is set to create the largest statelessness crisis in the world and cause immense human suffering". The members pointed out that the United Nations High Commissioner for Human Rights has called the CAA 'fundamentally discriminatory', and also accused the Indian government of "discriminating against, harassing and prosecuting national and religious minorities and silencing any opposition, human rights groups... and journalists critical of the government". The members have asked EU to include a "strong human rights clause with an effective implementation and suspension mechanism" while negotiating any trade agreement with India.

Asia and Oceania

Several silent protests were held in December by students in Israel. On the same day, students of University of Dhaka assembled in solidarity for the student protesters who were beaten by police and also condemned the CAA.

On 22 December, members of the Indian community in Australia gathered at the Parliament of Victoria in Melbourne in huge numbers and protested against the new Act and police brutality through sloganeering.

On 24 December, a 32-year-old Indian national protested against the CAA in the district of Marina Bay in Singapore. The local authorities called it an unauthorised protest on foreign politics.

In Aotearoa New Zealand, protestors held a march in Aotea Square, Auckland.

Africa

Protests were held outside the Indian Consulate in Cape Town.

== Methods ==
The protesters used various methods including demonstrations, civil disobedience, Dharna, Gherao, hunger strikes, Satyagraha, Hartal, vandalism, arsons, stone pelting, hashtag activism, general strike and Bandh against the bill.

Protesters used several slogans and poems during the protests. Lyricist and Urdu poet Rahat Indori's famous ghazal "Sabhi ka khoon hai shaamil yahan ki mitti mein; kisi ke baap ka Hindustan thodi hai" (This land has seen sacrifices from everyone; Hindustan is not anyone's property) resonates throughout the protest. Revolutionary poems by Pash like "Main Ghas Hoon; Main aapke Kiye Dhare Par Ugh Ayunga" (I am grass, I will rise everywhere), lyricist and writer Varun Grover's poem like "Tanashah aakar jayenge, hum kagaz nahi dikhayenge" (Dictators will come and go but we will not show our documents), "Main Inkaar Karta Hoon" (I refuse) penned by singer Aamir Aziz and the popular poem "Main Hindustani Musalmaan Hoon" (I am an Indian Muslim) by Indian spoken word poet Hussain Haidry has been used during the protests. Along with poems, the famous revolutionary "Aazadi!" slogan by JNU students has been used extensively throughout the protest in all over the country and abroad.

Slogans, poems and songs used during Indian independence movement like "Inquilab Zindabad" (Long live the revolution) coined by Indian freedom fighter Hasrat Mohani, "Sarfaroshi Ki Tamanna aab haamare dill mein hai; Dekhna hai zor kitna baazu-e-qatil mein hai" (The desire for revolution is in our hearts; Let's see how much strength the enemy has) written by Bismil Azimabadi which were later popularised by martyr Bhagat Singh, Ashfaqullah Khan, Chandrashekhar Azad and Ram Prasad Bismil were used as main vocal resistance during the protest. Protesters used the poetry written by revolutionary poets such as Faiz Ahmad Faiz and Habib Jalib, both considered symbols of resistance against military dictatorships and state oppression in Pakistan. Poems such as "Hum Dekhenge" (We will witness) penned by Faiz and "Main nahin janta, main nahin manta" (I refuse to acknowledge, I refuse to accept) penned by Jalib inspired large scale protests in form of banners and recitations. "Saare Jahan Se Achcha Hindustan Haamara" (Better than the entire world, is our Hindustan) by Urdu poet Muhammad Iqbal was recited in the protests. Singer and lyricist Aamir Aziz wrote Main Inkaar Karta Hoon as a Hindustani protest poem. Aziz's work was political poetry which was used during the protests and also to protest against the police brutality on the student protesters who were demonstrating against the Act. Along with Hindi and Urdu literature, English poems and slogans were also used for the protests. Among those one such dramatic monologue by a teacher named Ajmal Khan, "Write me down!, I am an Indian; This is my land, If I have born here, I will die here; There for, Write it down! Clearly In bold and capital letters, On the top of your NRC, that I am an Indian!", improvised from Mahmoud Darwish's song Write Down!, questions the Act's secularism and the Government. The poem strongly urged not to question the identity and patriotism of the Indian Muslims, the tribals, the poor, the landless, the Dalits and questioned the various actions of right wing organisations in the country. Pink Floyd co-founder and musician Roger Waters recites "Everything will be remembered, Everything recorded", an English Transliteration of Aamir Aziz's poem "Sab Yaad Rakha Jayega" at a protest in London. Kannada poem were also recited to protest. Siraj Bisaralli, a Kannada poet, recited his own poem "Ninna Dakhale Yaavaga Needuttee?" (When will you show your documents?) at a cultural festival and got arrested. English placards like "Modi-Shah, You Gave Me Depression", "Rise Against Fascism", "Don't Be Dead Inside For Democracy", "Fascism, Down Down", "I'll show you my documents, if you show your degree!" were used against the CAA-NRC and the Government, and placards like "Delhi Police: Shanti (Peace), Sewa (Service), Nyaya (Justice)?" and "Make Tea Not War" questions the Delhi Police's brutal actions against student protesters.

=== Art ===
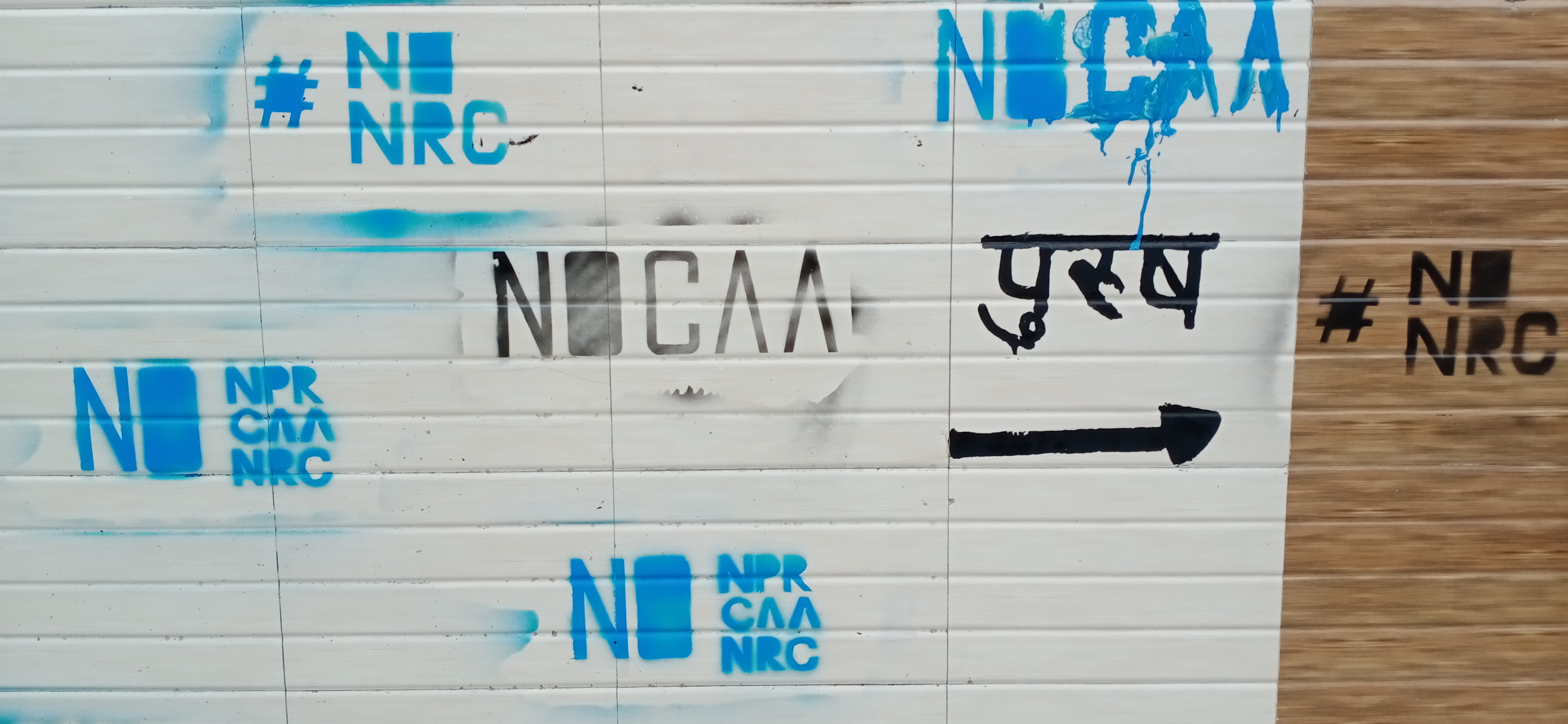
No NPR CAA NRC graffiti on a public toilet at Shaheen Bagh protests, New Delhi, 8 January 2020

Various artists created comics, illustrations, and posters against the CAA and NRC. Several political cartoonists created pieces covering the protests.

A group of activists in Chennai drew kolams (geometrical patterns drawn on the ground with rice flour or chalk) criticising the CAA and NRC. This novel protest was then officially supported by the opposition DMK party. Following the kolam protests in Tamil Nadu, anti-CAA protestors in West Bengal also started drawing kolams, known as alpana or rangoli in Bengal.

=== Government ===
The government used various methods to stop the protests, including mass shooting by riot police, lathi charge, mass arrest, Internet shutdown, curfew, transport restrictions, water cannon, and imposing ban on assembly (Section 144).

== Participants ==
The law was considered controversial since the time it was proposed, leading to protests from students, political organisations and citizen groups. On 4 December, the draft legislation was shared and the student organisation, All Assam Students' Union (AASU) objected to the proposal. AASU had participated in the Assam Movement in the 1970s and 1980s against the illegal immigration of Bangladeshis.

The protests started in Assam in early December. By 12 December, students in at least 50 colleges and universities nationwide had joined the protests. The student protests subsequently grew and spread all over the country and several political and citizen groups joined it. The protests came into national and international prominence after the police crackdown following the violent crackdown of protests in Aligarh Muslim University and Jamia Millia Islamia. Student leaders from Jamia Millia Islamia Aysha Renna and Ladeeda Farzana who were brutally attacked became the prominent faces of the movement.

=== Student organisations ===
==== Protesting ====
- Kerala State Muslim Students Federation
- Muslim Youth League
- All Assam Students’ Union
- Fraternity Movement
- Asom Jatiyatabadi Yuba Chatra Parishad
- All India Students Federation
- Chhatra Bharati
- Pinjra Tod
- Students For Society
- Ambedkar Students' Association
- Students Federation of India (affiliated to the Communist Party of India (Marxist))
- Democratic Youth Federation of India (youth wing of the Communist Party of India (Marxist))
- National Students' Union of India (student wing of the Indian National Congress)
- Indian Youth Congress (youth wing of the Indian National Congress party).
- All India Students Association (student wing of the Communist Party of India (Marxist–Leninist) Liberation)
- All India Democratic Students Organisation (affiliated to the Socialist Unity Centre of India (Communist))
- Krantikari Yuva Sangathan (KYS)
- Birsa Ambedkar Phule Students' Association
- All India Catholic University Federation
- All Arunachal Pradesh Students' Union
- North East Students' Organisation
- Jawaharlal Nehru University Students' Union
- Students Islamic Organisation of India
- Campus Front of India
- Mizo Zirlai Pawl
- Naga Students' Federation
- All Bodo Students Association
- Wesean Student Federation
- Twipra Students Federation
- All India Sikh Students Federation
- All Idu Mishmi Students Union
- All Tai Ahom Students’ Union

==== Pro-government ====
- Bharatiya Janata Yuva Morcha (student wing of the Bharatiya Janata Party)

== Casualties ==
As of 4 January, 21 people were killed by police firing guns during the CAA protests in Uttar Pradesh, 3 killed in Karnataka and 5 in Assam. Overall, 27 people were killed in the whole of India. With 19 killed and 1,246 people arrested based on 372 FIRs lodged in the state, UP was the most affected state with the biggest police crackdown in India.

- 12 December

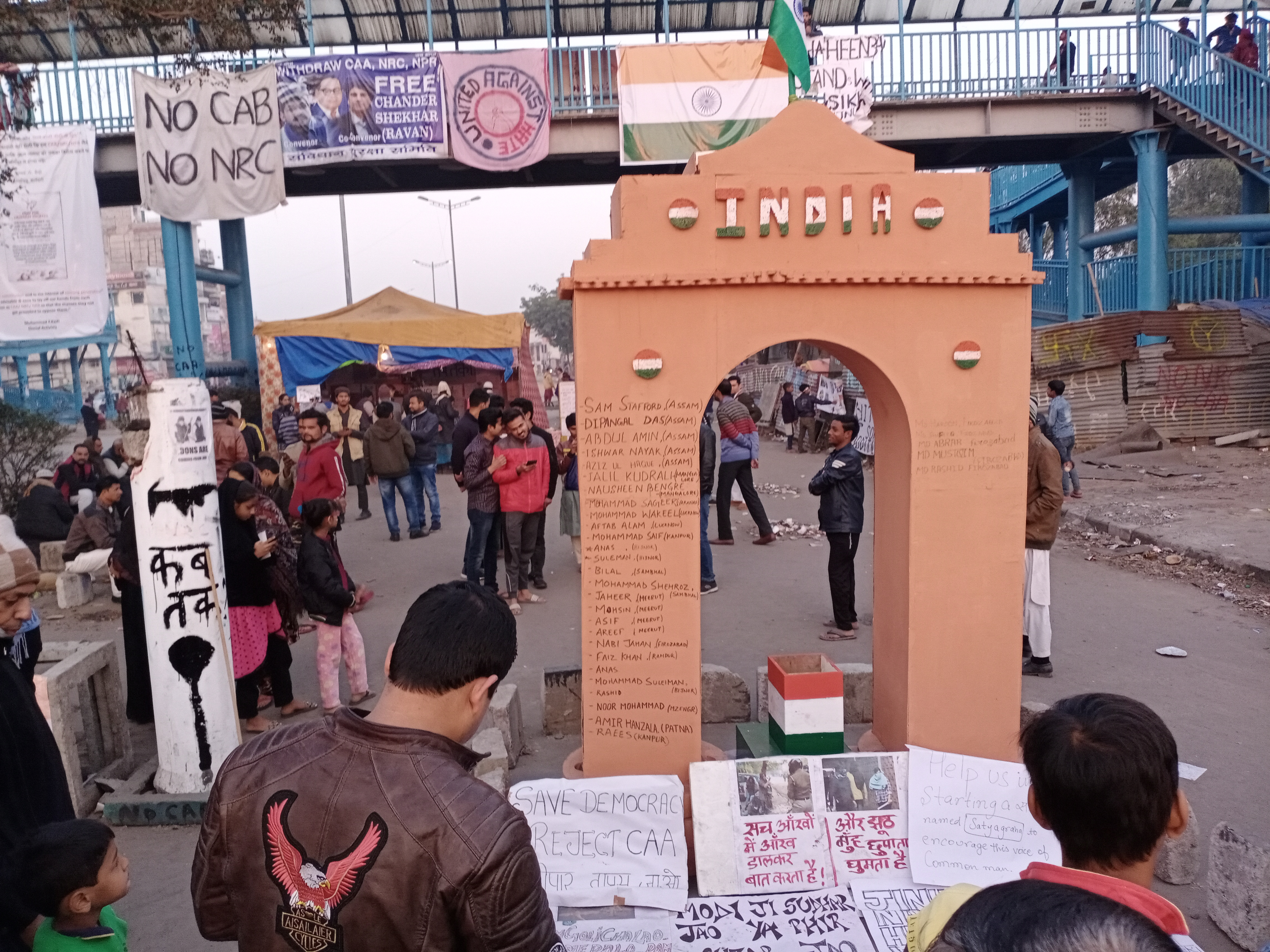
Names of those killed in anti-caa protests on a miniature India Gate artwork at Shaheen Bagh on 11 January 2020.

- Dipanjal Das (23), Sam Stafford (17), Abdul Alim (23), Ishwar Nayak (25), Azizul Haque (45) and Dwijendra Panging (35) in Assam.

- 19 December

- Nausheen Bengre (23) and Jaleel Kudroli (49) in Mangalore, Karnataka

- 20 December

- Mohammad Sageer (8), in Varanasi Uttar Pradesh, was killed in a stampede of people fleeing police lathi charge following CAA protests after Friday prayers.
- Mohammad Wakeel (25) in Uttar Pradesh.
- Aftab Alam (22) and Mohammad Saif (25) in Kanpur, Uttar Pradesh
- Asif (20), Arif (25), Zaheer (40), and Moshin (25) from Meerut, Uttar Pradesh
- Nabi Jahan (24) in Firozabad, Uttar Pradesh
- Faiz Khan (24) in Rampur, Uttar Pradesh
- Anas (22) and Sulaiman (26) from Nehtaur area, Bijnor, Uttar Pradesh
- Noor-e-Alam in Muzaffarnagar, Uttar Pradesh

- 21 December

- Mohammad Bilal (27) and Shehroz (22) in Uttar Pradesh.

== Impact ==
As the ongoing protest against the Citizenship Act turned violent, authorities of Gauhati University, Dibrugarh University and Cotton University postponed all semester exams scheduled up-to 16 December 2019. No play was possible on the fourth day of the cricket match between Assam and Services in the 2019–20 Ranji Trophy because of the protests. BCCI shifted two fixtures featuring three northeastern teams to other venues. The protests also affected the football matches of NorthEast United, with their fixture against Chennaiyin getting postponed. The India-Japan summit in Guwahati, which was supposed to be attended by Japanese Prime Minister Shinzo Abe was also cancelled.

=== Economy ===
The Indian Express reported that, during the second half of December, there had been a decline in the sales of cars, watches and other consumer goods, due to the ongoing protests.

=== Transport ===
Several trains and at least 700 flights were delayed and more than 20 cancelled as a result of the protests. Train services were completely suspended in parts of Assam after two railway stations in the state were set on fire. It was reported that the Indian Railways suffered losses worth ₹90 crore (US$9.6 million) in property damage due to the protests, including losses worth over ₹72 crore (US$7.7 million) in West Bengal alone. On 20 December, the Kerala State Road Transport Corporation suspended all bus services to Mangalore, while many Karnataka State Road Transport Corporation buses were blocked in Kerala.

On 19 and 20 December, several stations of the Delhi Metro were closed as a precautionary measure. On 19 December, the Delhi-Gurgaon highway was closed in view of the protests scheduled in Delhi.

=== Communication ===
The government imposed internet shutdowns in the states of Assam and Tripura, five districts in West Bengal, Bhopal, Dakshina Kannada and parts of Delhi. Mobile internet and SMS services were suspended in several places in Uttar Pradesh such as Lucknow, Ghaziabad, Bareilly, Meerut and Prayagraj.

=== Tourism ===
Canada, France, Israel, Russia, Singapore, Taiwan, the U.S. and the UK have issued travel advisories for nationals travelling to northeast India. The protests reportedly resulted in a 60% decline in tourists visiting the Taj Mahal in Agra for the month of December. The number of visitors went down by at least 90% in the state of Assam, according to the head of Assam Tourism Development Corporation.

== Reactions ==
=== Domestic ===
==== Return of Awards and Honours ====
- Mujtaba Hussain returned his Padma Shri and claimed Indian democracy has reduced to "a joke".
- The crews of the Malayalam film Sudani from Nigeria, which had won a national award for the best Malayalam film in the 66th National Film Awards decided to boycott the awards ceremony over the protests.
- Shirin Dalvi decided to return his Maharashtra Rajya Sahitya Akademi Award.
- Jahnu Barua withdrew his film Bhoga Khirikee from the Assam State Film Awards.

=== International ===
- Afghanistan: Former Afghanistan President Hamid Karzai urged Government of India to treat all minorities equally. In an interview to The Hindu, he said, "We don't have persecuted minorities in Afghanistan." Mentioning about the Afghanistan conflict, he said, "The whole country is persecuted. We have been in war and conflict for a long time. All religions in Afghanistan, Muslims and Hindus and Sikhs, which are our three main religions, have suffered."
- Bangladesh: In an interview to Gulf News Bangladesh Prime Minister Sheikh Hasina said, "Within India, people are facing many problems" and expressed her concerns saying, "We don't understand why (the Indian government) did it. It was not necessary". Though she maintained her stance that the CAA and NRC are internal matters of India. But Hasina's government had previously said that minority communities did not leave Bangladesh because of persecution. She also said that Prime Minister Modi assured her of no reverse migration from India.
- China: People's Daily, an official newspaper of Central Committee of the Chinese Communist Party, justified internet restrictions citing India's internet shutdowns. The newspaper said that India did not hesitate to shut down the internet in its two states when there was a significant threat to its national security; according to an article in The Times of India, activists described the justification as setting a dangerous precedent for internet freedom.
- Hungary: The Fidesz Hungarian government in Hungary has expressed support for India on Kashmir and the Citizenship Amendment Act protests.
- Kuwait: In a statement issued during National Assembly session in Kuwait group of lawmakers expressed their concern regarding "abusive legislative and repressive security measures" taken by the Government of India.
- Malaysia: Malaysian Prime Minister Mahathir Mohamad said "Already people are dying because of this law, so why is there a necessity to do this thing?". In response, the Government of India summoned the Chargé d'Affaires of the Malaysian Embassy over the matter.
- Pakistan: The Prime Minister of Pakistan, Imran Khan criticised the CAA by claiming that "the present Government. of India has been exposed of its fascist agenda as minorities have come out to protest against the CAA". He also expressed his concern that, such policies by the government. may create a major refugee crisis in the sub-continent.
- United States: US Congress think tank Congressional Research Service expressed concerns that the CAA along with the NRC may affect the status of the Indian Muslim community.

==== Organisation ====
- European Union: EU resolution states that CAA marks 'a dangerous shift ' in the way citizenship will be determined in India and is set to create the 'largest statelessness crisis in the world'.
- Organisation of Islamic Cooperation: OIC expressed their concern about present situation of CAA-NRC and urged the Government of India to ensure the safety of the Muslim minority and to follow obligation of Charter of the United Nations.
- United Nations: Secretary-General of the United Nations, António Guterres condemned the "violence and alleged use of excessive force by security forces" and urged the Government of India to respect the freedom of expression and opinion and freedom of peaceful assembly.

=== Human rights organisations ===
- United Nations Commission on Human Rights (UNCHR): Stéphane Dujarric, the spokesperson for the U.N. High Commissioner for Human Rights (OHCHR) had said that it is ‘concerned’ that the CAA is ‘fundamentally discriminatory in nature’. In a press briefing OHCHR said that CAA appears to "undermine the commitment to equality before the law enshrined in India's constitution and India's obligations under the International Covenant on Civil and Political Rights and the Convention for the Elimination of Racial Discrimination", which prohibit discrimination based on racial, ethnic or religious grounds. It also said that "all migrants, regardless of their migration status, are entitled to respect, protection and fulfilment of their human rights."
- Human Rights Watch (HRW): South Asia Director for HRW, Meenakshi Ganguly said that the "government failed to grasp the extent of public opposition over the erosion of basic rights evident in these protests". She urged that the government must establish an independent investigation into allegations of "excessive force, brutality, and vandalism" by police. Its "strongest response to the protests would be to repeal" the Act and "withdraw its plan for citizenship verification that threatens marginalized communities", the organisation said. According to an 82-page report published on 9 April 2020, by Human Rights Watch, "‘Shoot the Traitors’: Discrimination Against Muslims Under India's New Citizenship Policy," the police forces and other law enforcement officials perpetually failed in intervening during clashes between the supporters of the BJP government and those protesting against the new citizenship policies, in which the latter became a victim of repeated attacks.
- Amnesty International: Avinash Kumar, Executive Director of Amnesty India said "The CAA is a bigoted law that legitimises discrimination on the basis of religion." He also said that people should have the right to protest peacefully and should have right to freedom of peaceful assembly which facilitate freedom of expression and allows public debate. However, the Central Government and other state governments "rather than respecting, protecting and promoting this right, are clamping down on protestors by using repressive laws". Amnesty has also informed the US lawmakers that the CAA stands in "clear violation" of the constitution of India and international human rights law and "legitimises discrimination" on the basis of religion.

== Pro-CAA demonstrations ==
Rallies and demonstrations in support of Citizenship Amendment Bill were held in New Delhi, Mumbai, Nagpur, Bangalore, Dehradun and many other places. A rally in Kolkata was headed by Jagat Prakash Nadda, working national president of BJP, and was attended by persecuted Hindu refugees from Pakistan and Bangladesh. Protests against CAA were condemned in these rallies and hailed Prime Minister Narendra Modi for taking a decision on CAA. Nine Jain organisations came out in support of CAA on 20 December 2019 and thanked a BJP politician and BJP for the Amendment. Over 1,000 academicians released statements in support of CAA. Signatories included Swapan Dasgupta, Shishir Bajoria, journalist Kanchan Gupta and JNU faculty and administration including professor Ainul Hasan, dean of students Umesh Ashok Kadam and registrar Pramod Kumar.

The President of Delhi University Students' Union released a statement in support of the CAA which was condemned by partisan student unions of colleges under Delhi University.

A pro-CAA rally named Jana Jagarana Rally, was organised at Tirupati and attended by BJP national vice-president and former Madhya Pradesh Chief Minister Shivraj Singh Chouhan and mostly BJP workers. The participants raised slogans in support of CAA and carried placards with slogans such as ‘We support CAA’, ‘India supports CAA’, ‘CAA a punishment to intruders and traitors’ and ‘CAA protects refugees’. The participants also carried a 500-metre-long Indian national flag.

=== Assam ===
A rally was organised by BJP to support the Citizenship Amendment Act in Assam's Morigaon on 27 December in which over 50,000 civilians, including BJP workers, Asom Gana Parishad and Bodoland People's Front leaders took part. The 4-km long rally was led by Assam Chief Minister of Assam Sarbananda Sonowal and state Finance Minister Himanta Biswa Sarma.

=== West Bengal ===
Thousands of BJP workers took out a massive rally named Abhinandan Yatra or Thanks-giving rally in North Kolkata in support of CAA on 30 December. It was led by the party's Working President J P Nadda to thank Prime Minister Narendra Modi for enacting the Citizenship Amendment Act.

=== Gujarat ===
On 24 December, a large gathering was organised at Sabarmati Ashram, Ahmedabad. Vijay Rupani, Chief Minister of Gujarat was present at the event, said that Gujarat will definitely implement CAA. He also stated that Muslims have 150 countries to go while Hindus have only one. BJP leaders and ministers took parts in the different rallies organised across all 33 districts of Gujarat.

=== Maharashtra ===
Maharashtra witnessed pro-CAA demonstrations in cities including Nagpur, Mumbai, Yavatmal, Wardha and Pune. On 23 December 2019, RSS linked organisations carried out rally in Nagpur which was attended by Nitin Gadkari and Devendra Fadnavis along with more than 25,000 people.

Devendra Fadnavis, former chief minister of Maharashtra, targeted Shiv Sena at the event organised by BJP's Samvidhan Sanman Manch and also organised pro-CAA rally in Mumbai.

=== Phone call campaign ===
Several BJP leaders including Home Minister Amit Shah had publicised a phone number, asking people to call the number as a way to show their support for the CAA. Many accounts on social media were seen sharing the same number and asking people to call, intending to inflate the number of supporters of CAA. The number was also shared on bogus posts offering free six-month subscriptions to the streaming site Netflix for free. Netflix called the offer as fake.

=== Fake videos ===
A video of Naga Sadhus celebrating at Kumbh Mela at Allahabad in March 2019 was shared and made viral on social media, falsely claiming that this was the video of Hindus in the rally supporting CAA.

=== Overseas ===
Members of the Indian-American community held a pro-CAA rally in front of the Indian Consulate in Houston on 20 December 2019. They also held other rallies at Victor Steinbrueck Park, Seattle and Texas State Capitol building in Austin on 22 December 2019. Rallies were also held at Ted Kaltenbach Park, Dublin, Ohio and at Nash Square Park, Raleigh, North Carolina.

== Petitions in Supreme Court ==
On 14 January, the Kerala government approached Supreme Court to challenge the CAA under section 131 of the constitution that provides Supreme Court the power to decide the disputes between the states and the Government of India. The Kerala government in its petition called the act "a violation of India's secular constitution" and accused the Indian government of dividing the country among religious lines. The Supreme Court had scheduled the hearing of CAA related petitions on 22 January. The students' association have called a complete shutdown of the colleges and university in the north-east, on 22 January, asking the court to declare CAA unconstitutional.

On 22 January 144 CAA related petitions scheduled for hearing in the Supreme Court of India were brought up. The Chief Justice of India (CJI) Sharad A. Bobde had led the three judge bench in hearing the petitions. The court gave notice to the government on the petitions and allowed one month time to respond in the next hearing in February.

K.V. Vishwanathan, a senior advocate addressed the court, stating "The most immediate concern now is the sweeping powers given to executive authorities to brand people as 'doubtful citizens'. Once this is done, there are no guidelines to help these people. This is sinister. It will lead to gerrymandering of electoral rolls. The concern is spread across both the majority Hindus and the minorities as well. You have to address this fear... Otherwise fear and insecurity will pervade the country." Reacting to the concerns the CJI stated that the laws like the CAA are not irreversible, and the court will hear the interim prayer for a stay on CAA at a future date in February.

On 3 March, the Office of the United Nations High Commissioner for Human Rights (OHCHR), filed an application in the Supreme Court and asked to be made a party in the case citing "the exclusions of persons... on the basis of their religion". The OHCHR Commissioner, Michelle Bachelet said that the "differentiations" drawn by the Act are not "sufficiently objective and reasonable". However, the Ministry of External Affairs reacted to the move and said that the CAA is an "internal matter" of India and "no foreign party had any locus standi on issues pertaining to India's sovereignty".

== See also ==
- 2019 Jamia Millia Islamia attack
- 2020 JNU Attack
- Assam Accord
- Assam Movement
- National Register of Citizens
- North East Delhi Riots
- Shaheen Bagh protests
