= Protest art at Jamia Millia Islamia =

Students and artists created art and graphite paintings on the walls and roads of the Jamia Millia Islamia campus in New Delhi, India, following the 2019 Jamia Millia Islamia attack by Delhi Police in December 2019. The protest art spread into the neighborhood of Shaheen Bagh and their protests, and continued to be created until January and February 2020.

In addition to visual art, protesters utilized literature, theatre, and music. The protest art, and protests as a whole, were also characterized by the widespread mobilization of women and women artists.

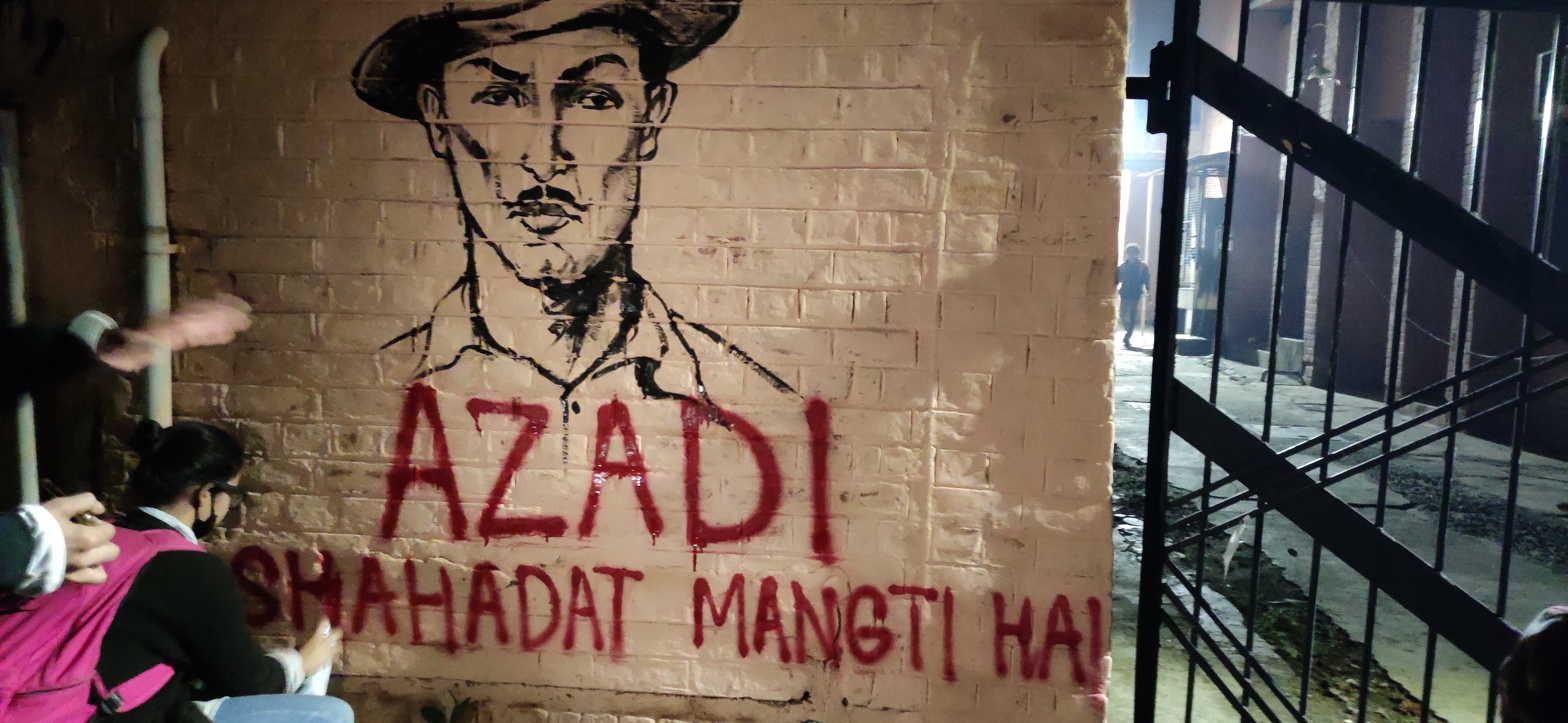
A fine art student making art inside the campus on 13 December 2019.

== Background ==
On Friday, 13 December 2019, the Delhi police led a lathi-charge on the students who agitated against the Citizenship Amendment Act (CAA) bill. The violent attack by the police sparked agitation among the students.

== Graffiti and murals ==
On 13 December, the day of the attack, a post-graduate student from Fine Arts started painting on the walls to show her resistance against the police action on students. Other artist and students followed suit, with both graffiti and murals. After the 15 December incident, the image and video of a group of female students wearing hijabs standing up to Delhi police went viral. This visual, of a student wearing a hijab pointing at the police, demanding that they stop beating students, became the basis of art and symbolic expression of this protest.

Students called for art, and artists responded, with the walls of the campus from the stadium to gate no. 4 becoming covered with graffiti.

Graffiti was added to the roads in and around the university's campus. The road art included caricatures of the Prime Minister, Narendra Modi, and the Minister of Home Affairs, Amit Shah, alongside slogans such as "you can't impose 144, on our speech, freedom and truth," "jiyo aur jeene do" (live and let live), "#No CAA, #No NRC," and "mera desh, mera samvidhan" (my country, my constitution). Other slogans such as "zinda qaume panch aaal tak intazar nahi karti'," further expressed anti-dictatorship and anti-authoritarian sentiments. Other individuals portrayed in the protest art included Bhagat Singh, Mahatma Gandhi, Dr. B.R Ambedkar, Jawaharlal Nehru, Maulana Abul Kalam Azad, Mohammad Ali Jauhar and Dr Zakir Hussain.

Many of the artists shared their art anonymously or under pseudonyms, out of fears for their safety.

=== Removal of graffiti ===
In March 2020, when the Delhi government announced a complete lockdown as a precautionary measure to prevent the spread of coronavirus, the students called off the protest, after which the Delhi police began to remove the graffiti from the Jamia Millia Islamia campus and Shaheen Bagh.

== Literature ==
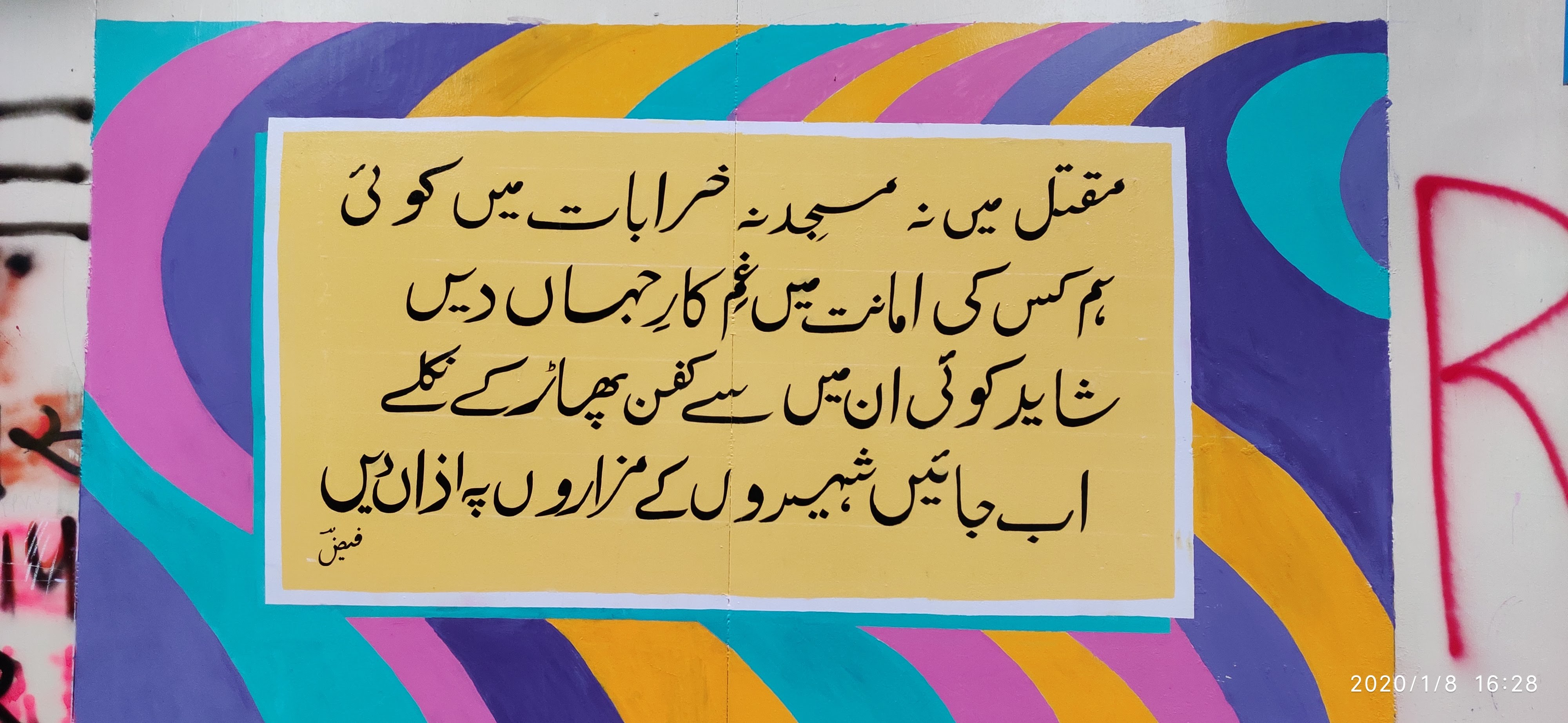
Faiz Ahmad Faiz's couplet on Jamia's wall during the Anti-CAA protest.

During the 100-day long protest, resistance literature became the language of protest, such as Faiz Ahmad Faiz's 'Hum Dekhenge', Habib Jalib's 'Dastoor', and Rahat Indori's "Kisi k baap ka Hindustan thodi hai" couplet. Avtar Singh Pash and Dushyant Kumar's resistance poetry were also painted on the campus walls of Jamia Millia Islamia.

== Songs ==
Songs are always the bearer of protest and play a role in spreading the conscience about the issue among the common man. It is generally situational and associated with the cause and movements. In this agitation, many poets and musician came out with their own version of resistance songs. Few became popular among the people like Hum Kagaz Nahi Dikhayenge by Varun Grover and 'Sab Yaad Rakha Jayega' by Amir Aziz.

== See also ==
- Citizenship Amendment Act protests
- Shaheen Bagh protest
- Protest art
