= Shaheen Bagh protest =

2019–20 sit-in protest in Delhi, India

- Part of Citizenship Amendment Act protests
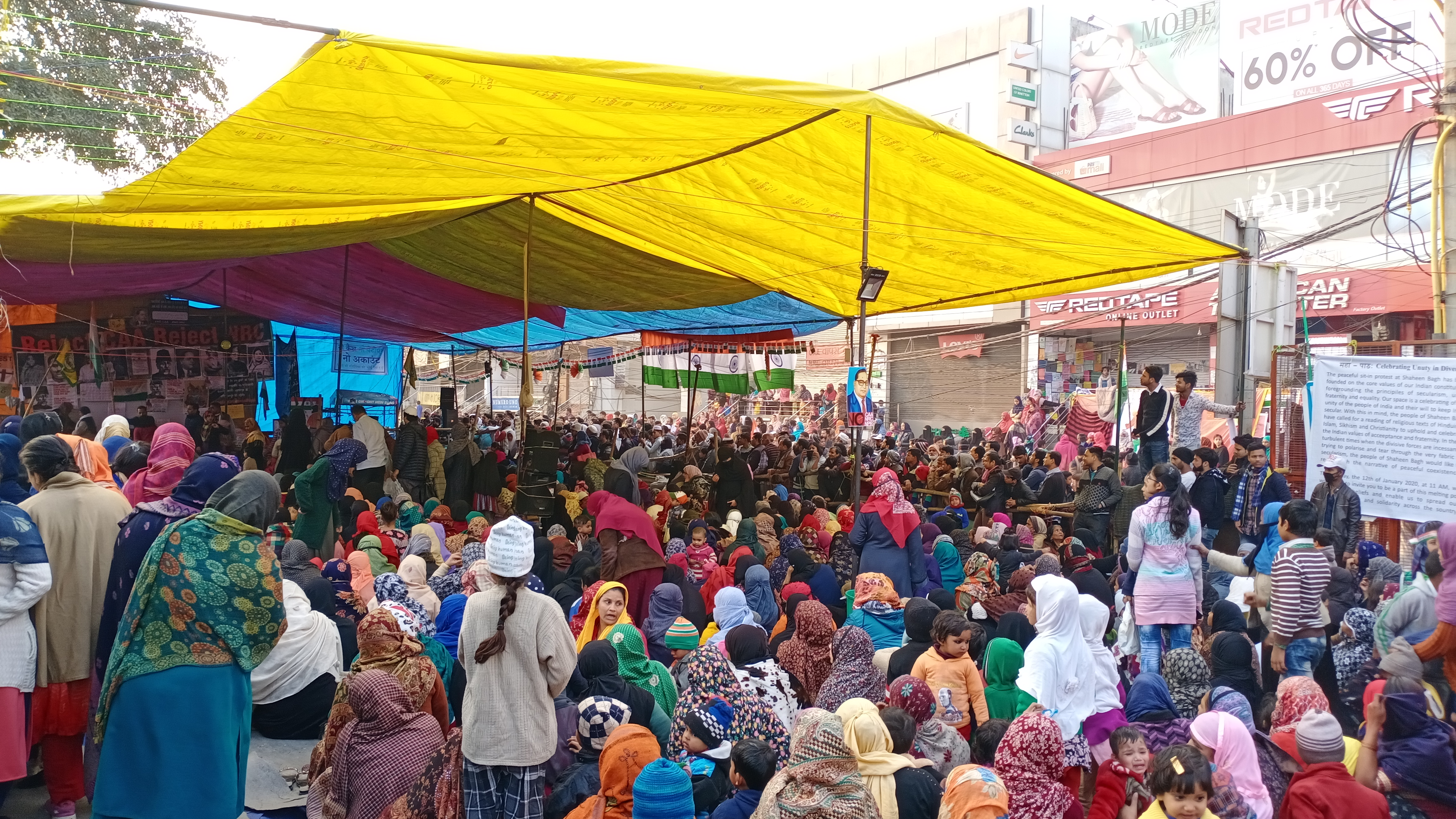
- Shaheen Bagh women protesters blocking a major road (Road 13A GD Birla Marg, Shaheen Bagh - Kalindi Kunj area) in New Delhi
- Date: 15 December 2019 – 24 March 2020; (101 days)
- Location: Shaheen Bagh, Delhi, India; 28°32′34″N 77°18′09″E
- Caused by: Passage of the Citizenship (Amendment) Act, 2019 and the following police intervention at Jamia Millia Islamia
- Goals: To roll back Citizenship (Amendment) Act, 2019 (CAA) and prevent implementation of National Register of Citizens (NRC) and National Population Register (NPR)
- Methods: Sit-in, demonstrations, civil disobedience, hunger strike, public lecture, public debate, art (graffiti, poster, scale model, poetry, storytelling, street performance, puppetry)
- Status: Halted for lockdown related to the COVID-19 pandemic in India. Protest did not resume. On 7 October 2020, the Supreme Court judged that Shaheen Bagh type protests, which occupy public places indefinitely, are not allowed.
- Result: Unsuccessful

Lead figures
Non-centralized leadership (Note: One of the media coordinators of the protest, Qazi Emad. One of the national conveners of the protest, Shoaib Jamai.)	

Casualties
- Deaths: 0 (Note: A four month old child died; it was reported that the child caught a cold after having been exposed to the winter chill as the mother was attending the outdoor protest.)
- Injuries: 1
- Arrested: 10 (Note: On 24 March 2020 Delhi Police detained 6 women and 3 men from the Shaheen Bagh protest site following precautionary restrictions on movement related to the pandemic. On 30 March 2020 three of the men arrested were released under certain conditions such as reporting to the Shaheen Bagh Police station once a week. In another incident a man was arrested for supporting the Shaheen Bagh protest online; he was granted bail after 5 months.)
- Location within Delhi Location within India

A peaceful sit-in protest in Delhi, India, began on 15 December 2019 and lasted until 24 March 2020. The protest was led by women who blocked a major road (Note: Road No 13-A, Shaheen Bagh (GD Birla Marg) - Mathura Road - Kalindi Kunj - Shaheen Bagh stretch is a border point that connects New Delhi to Noida and Faridabad.) at Shaheen Bagh using non-violent resistance 24×7. Mainly consisting of Muslim women, the protest began in response to the passage of the Citizenship (Amendment) Act (CAA) on 11 December 2019 and the ensuing police intervention against students at Jamia Millia Islamia who were opposing the Amendment. Protesters agitated against the citizenship issues of the CAA, National Register of Citizens (NRC) and National Population Register (NPR), in addition to police brutality, unemployment, and poverty, and for women's safety. The Delhi Police barricaded major roads in and around the area, affecting more than 100,000 vehicles a day and adding hours to some journeys. Following the North East Delhi riots, police presence in the area temporarily increased with over 1000 personnel being assigned to Shaheen Bagh. After the COVID-19 outbreak in India and subsequent government-enforced restrictions the protest continued for several days in a more controlled manner. Following the complete lockdown imposed in Delhi on 23 March 2020, the remaining protesters were arrested or forcefully removed from the site by the Delhi Police.

The barricaded and tented venue drew large crowds with tens of thousands of protesters participating. Some days saw over 150,000 people at the venue. The protest inspired similar copycat protests across the country, such as those in Gaya, Kolkata, Prayagraj, Mumbai and Bengaluru. The leaderless protest was generally against the Bharatiya Janata Party (BJP) government. The blockade became a campaign issue in the 2020 Delhi Legislative Assembly elections, especially for the BJP. BJP's campaign was negative towards the Shaheen Bagh protests with a number of campaigners making controversial statements such as goli maaro (Shoot them). Some BJP campaigners promised to immediately remove the blockade after being voted into power and were accused by their opponents of prolonging the demonstration to agitate voters. BJP won an extra six seats as compared to the previous election while the Aam Aadmi Party retained a clear majority with 62 seats.

A number of petitions were filed to stop the blockade. The Delhi High Court refused to hear the first two pleas and on 14 January 2020 declared the blockade to be a police matter. The Delhi Police said that they would not use force to end the blockade. A third petition highlighted the difficulty faced by students with upcoming board examinations. The matter reached the Supreme Court of India, which appointed three mediators to initiate conversations with the protesters regarding shifting to a location which wouldn't block a public place. In response to the batch of petitions filed against the protestors, the Supreme Court of India stated on 7 October 2020 that the "indefinite" occupation of public space for protest or expressing dissent was not acceptable.

One of the Shaheen Bagh protestors, 82-year old Bilkis, was listed in Time magazine's 100 most influential people of 2020, BBC's 100 Women and was also named as the 'Women of the Year' in the 2021 edition of The Muslim 500. Delhi Police labelled Sharjeel Imam as one of the 'masterminds' of the protest. While the protest was praised for a number of reasons some commentators called it a failure with regard to the main goal of revoking CAA.

== Background ==
Women in India have been at the forefront of some of the largest and most successful resistance movements in the country such as the Chipko Movement of 1973, the anti-nuclear protests in Tamil Nadu in 1980; protests following the Bhopal gas leak and the movement to save the Narmada river.

=== Citizenship (Amendment) Act, 2019 ===
"By insinuating that we don't know anything about CAA or NRC, Modi thinks he can diminish our protest. But we are aware, we have read the Act. We also know what the constitution says."

— Ghazala, 22, Shaheen Bagh protester

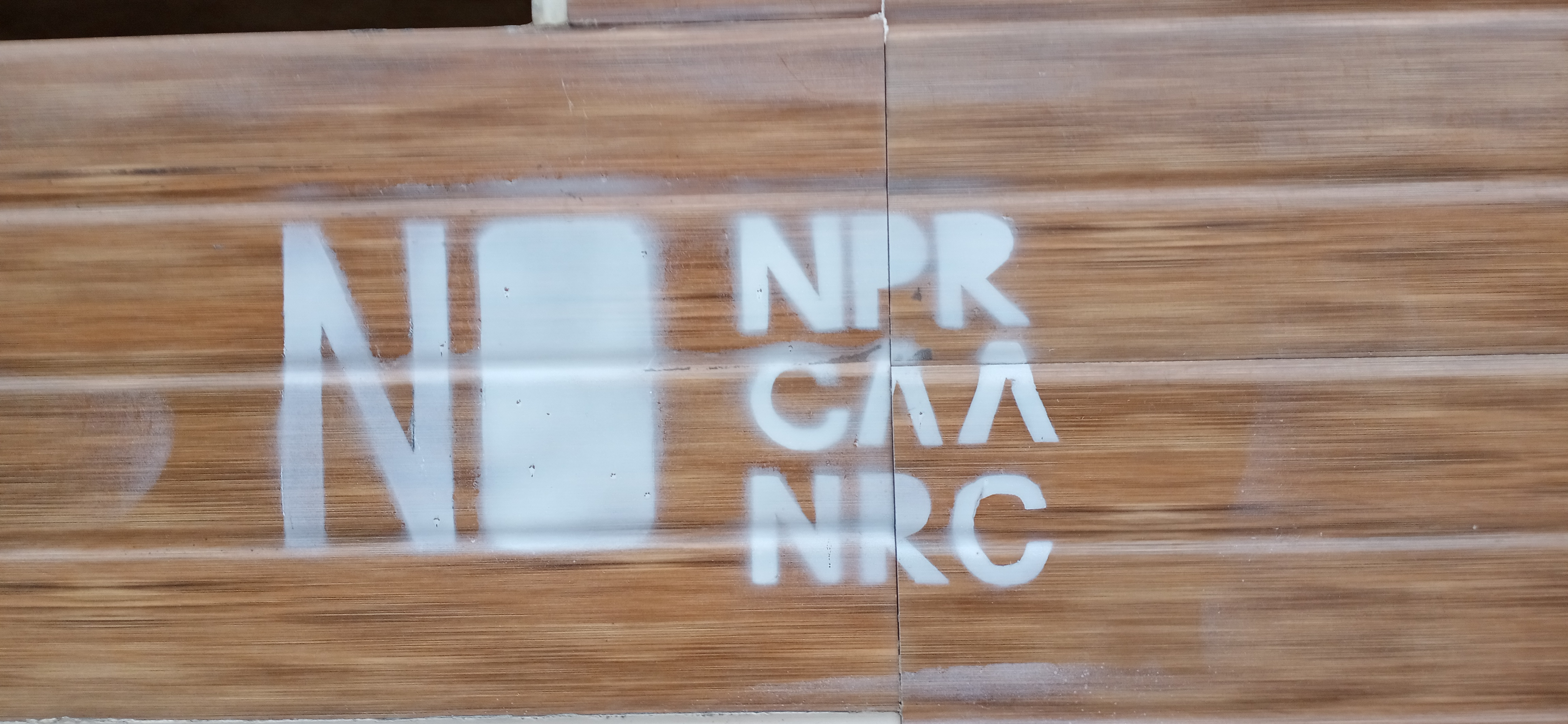
No NPR CAA NRC graffiti at Shaheen Bagh

On 12 December 2019, the President of India gave assent to the Citizenship (Amendment) Act, 2019 (CAA) following its passage in both houses of the parliament on 11 and 12 December. CAA amends the Citizenship Act of 1955 to grant a swifter path to Indian citizenship under the assumption of religious persecution to any individual belonging to the specific religious minorities of Hindus, Sikhs, Buddhists, Jains, Parsis and Christians from Afghanistan, Bangladesh and Pakistan, for those who entered India on or before 31 December 2014. However, the Act does not mention Muslims and does not offer eligibility benefits to Muslim immigrants or immigrants belonging to other religions or from other countries, such as Sri Lankan Tamil refugees, Rohingya Muslim and Hindu refugees from Myanmar, and Buddhist refugees from Tibet. It is also alleged that the National Register of Citizens (NRC), which the government planned to implement for the country in 2021, could be used to deprive Muslims of Indian citizenship. The CAA–NRC issue also ignited protest against the economic crisis and economic disparities. Women's safety, rising cost of commodities, increasing unemployment and poverty also acted as catalysts for the protest.

=== Shaheen Bagh ===
Scholars Kiran Bhatia and Radhika Gajjala have noted that "the location of this (Shaheen Bagh) site is critical for the anti-CAA protests for several reasons". Shaheen Bagh is located in Jamia Nagar, South East Delhi, an area with a large population of Muslims from diverse backgrounds; daily labourers to rich businessmen. The Jamia Millia Islamia University is located nearby and getting admitted is an aspiration for students and teachers alike. Further the university has a number of community programmes in the area. So when the police stormed the campus of the primarily Muslim university on 15 December 2019 resulting in injuries to 200 student protestors, Shaheen Bagh came out in support.

== The protest ==
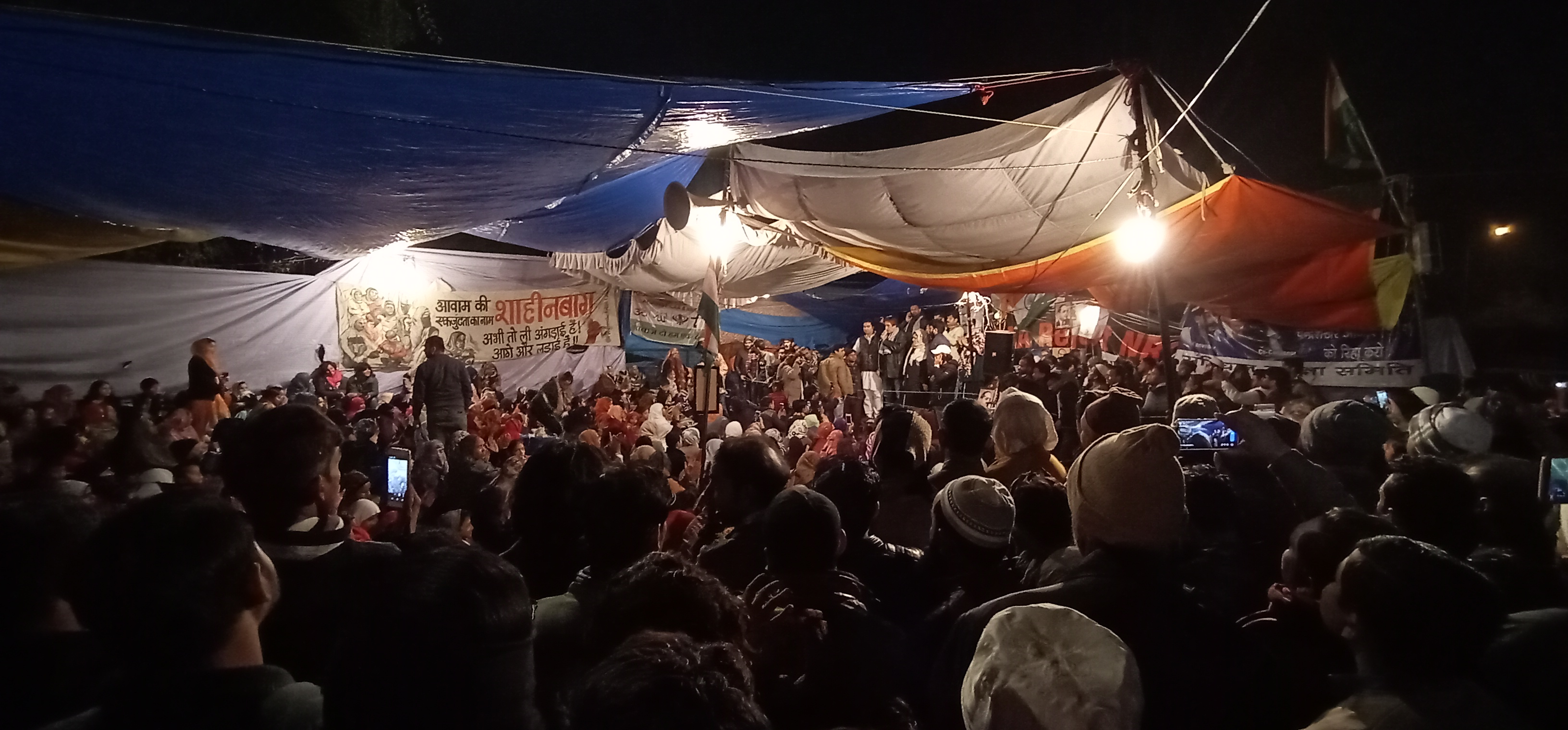
Protesters under a makeshift tent at the site during a night in December 2019.

The Shaheen Bagh protest was launched on 15 December 2019, when 10 to 15 local women began to blockade Kalindi Kunj Road (Road 13A), a six-lane highway bordering the Muslim-dominated neighbourhood of Shaheen Bagh in southeast Delhi. More locals joined and it became a continuous sit-in protest. Many of the women were hijab- and burqa-wearing Muslim homemakers. Elderly women also joined the protest. Children and newborn babies were brought by their parents. The protesters were supported and coordinated by more than a hundred volunteers, including students and professionals from Delhi. These volunteers organised themselves around different tasks: setting up makeshift stages, shelters and bedding; providing food, water, medicine, and access to toilet facilities; installing CCTV cameras and bringing in outside speakers. Within 10 days, the peaceful protest had grown to cover nearly 1 kilometre (0.62 mi) of the highway, supported by donations. On 2 January 2020, some volunteers including Sharjeel Imam withdrew and urged to stop the protest, fearing that its message could be hijacked by political parties with the approach of the Delhi election, which they felt could "tarnish the image of the movement" and raise the risk of violence. However, the protesters immediately made it clear through social media that they would continue.

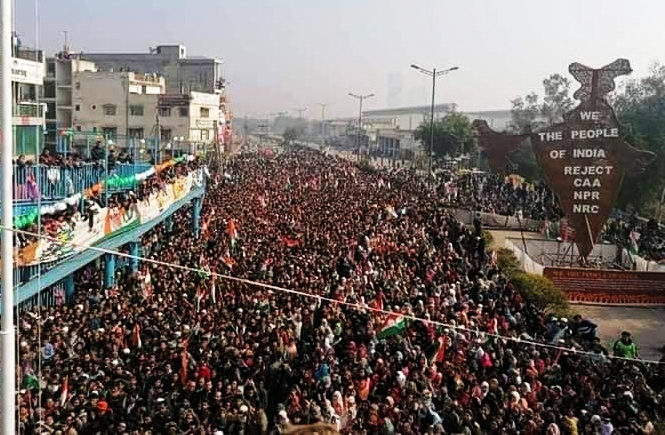
Shaheen Bagh Protest on 26 January 2020, celebrating the 71st Republic Day of India.

With crowds attending in the thousands, the protest became one of the longest sit-in protests of this magnitude against CAA, also inspiring other similar protests across the country. Its stages became prominent platforms to voice issues from which to voice issues and the protest gained support from Punjab farmers. A number of protestors cited the Jamia Milia Islamia attack. The protesters also supported unions opposing the government's "anti-labour" policies. CNN reported that a woman named Bahro Nisa quit her job to continue full-time protest, saying "They tried to stifle the voices of our children [...] as mothers, we decided to stand up". An article in Business Standard called the protest "A new kind of satyagraha", noting how a girl was allowed to express her doubts on stage by explaining her dilemma of supporting the CAA while understanding its dangers.

On 31 December 2019, thousands of camping protestors sang the Indian national anthem at midnight, on what was reportedly Delhi's second-coldest night in the previous 100 years. The protest had one of its largest crowds on 12 January 2020; TIME reported over 150,000. On 26 January, the 71st Republic Day of India, over 100,000 people assembled at the protest site. The flag was hoisted by three local elderly women who became known as "Shaheen Bagh dadis" ("grandmother" in Urdu) during the protest and by the mother of Rohith Vemula. This included Bilquis, Asma and Sarwari. The protesters extended an invitation to the Prime Minister Narendra Modi to come and celebrate the Valentine's Day with heart-shaped cardboard banners. A small health camp was also set up beside the camped protesters. Doctors and nurses along with medical students from different medical institutes and hospitals joined as volunteers. A group of Sikh farmers also came and set up a langer (free community kitchen) in the area.

Interactive map of locations of the Shaheen Bagh protest. Pan and zoom the map and click on points for more details and images.
- Protest site
- Main protest tent
- Police barricades

The barricaded area was visited by numerous politicians such as Indian National Congress leaders Mani Shankar Aiyar and Shashi Tharoor; social activists Chandrashekhar Azad, Umar Khalid and Jigesh Mevani; and celebrities such as Mohammed Zeeshan Ayyub. On 14 February 2020, filmmaker Anurag Kashyap visited Shaheen Bagh and delivered a speech. On the same day, the anniversary of the 2019 Pulwama attack, the protestors paid homage to the 40 Central Reserve Police Force personnel martyred in the attack, a suicide bombing attack by terrorists. The Union Home Minister Amit Shah sent an open invitation for talks to the elderly Shaheen Bagh protestors. However, a crowd of protestors who marched towards the Union Minister's residence for talks was stopped by the Delhi Police.

Some protesters kept a hunger strike. Zainul Abidin, a 29-year-old social activist and businessman from Jamia Nagar, had been on hunger strike since the protest started on 15 December 2019 and continued it into 2020. 50-year-old social activist Mehroneesha began a hunger strike on 1 January 2020. Both stated that they were motivated by police brutality on the students of JMI along with perceived injustices of CAA-NRC. Abidin stated concern for his two sisters who were studying in Jamia, as police reportedly entered the toilets of the institute and beat the female students. Abidin was hospitalised and ended a 42-day hunger strike on 26 January 2020.

== Protest art ==
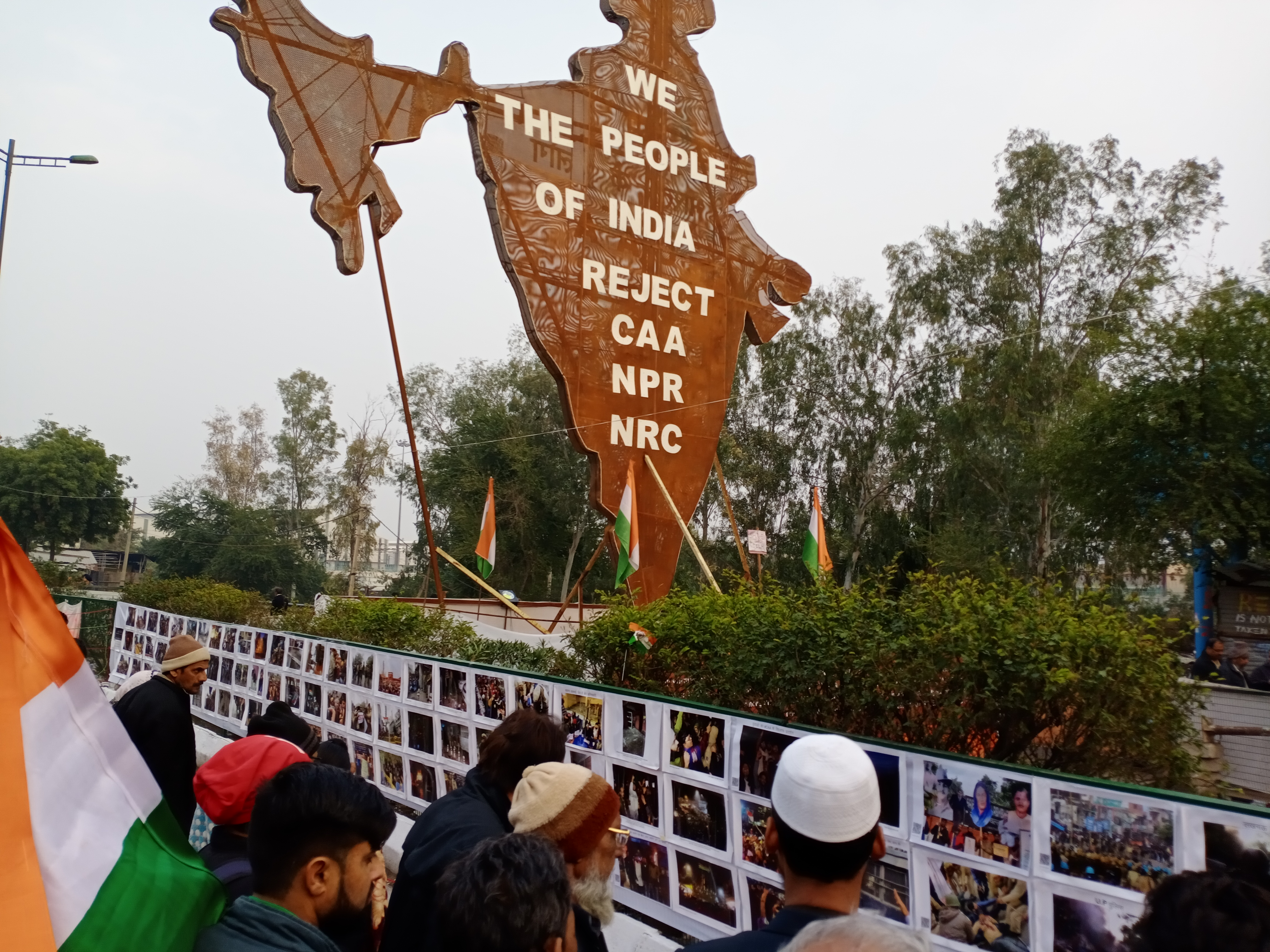
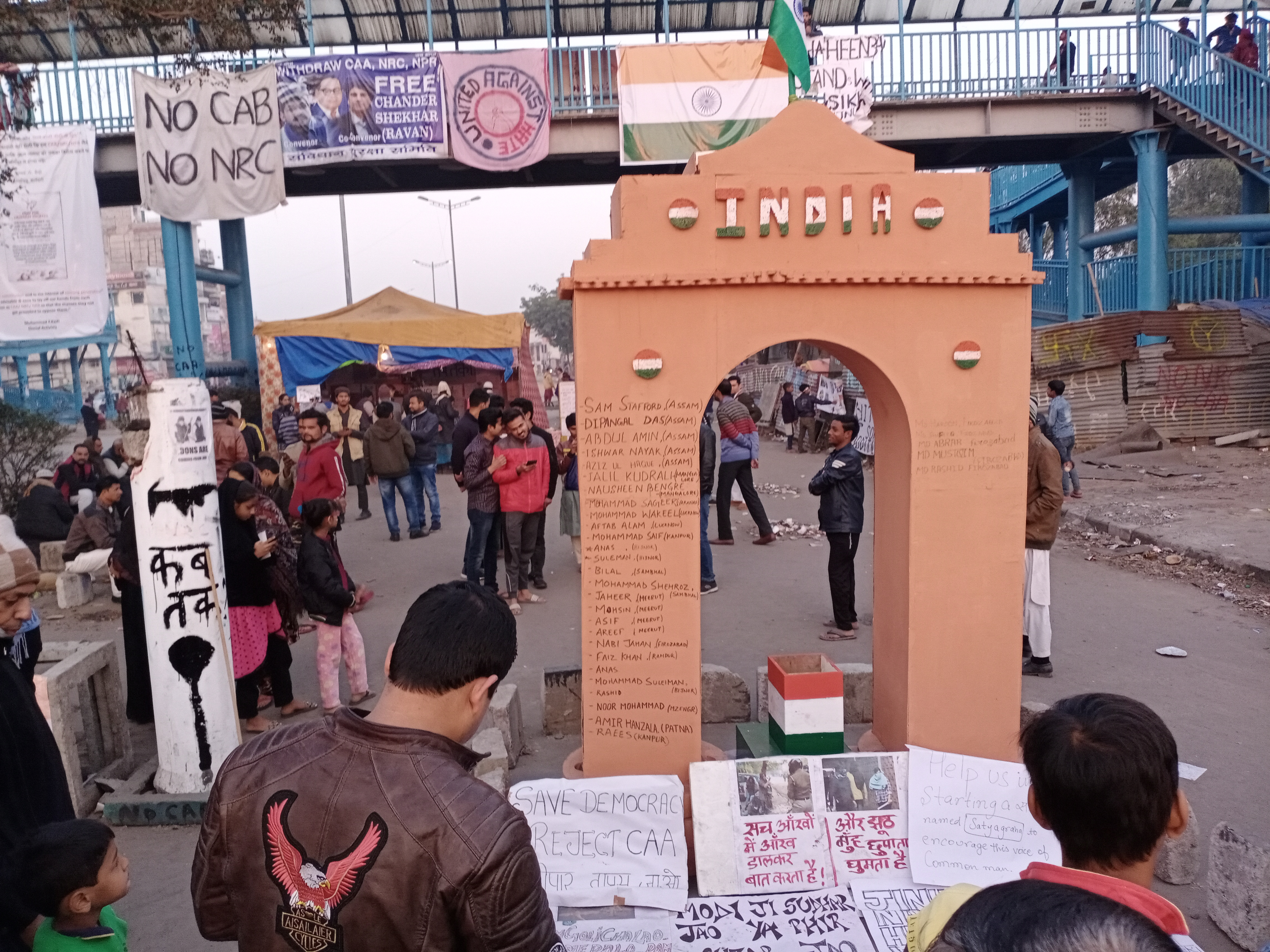
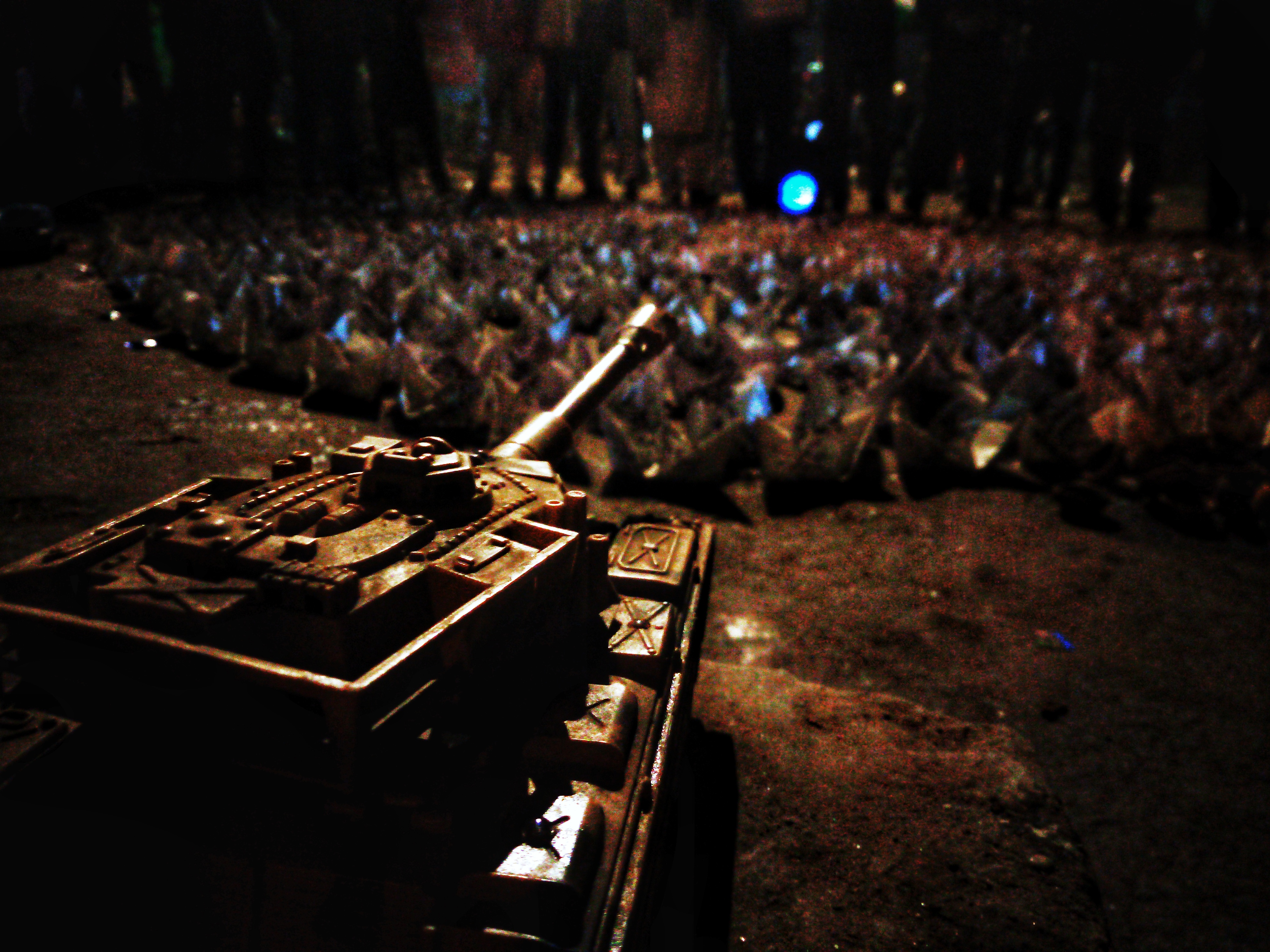
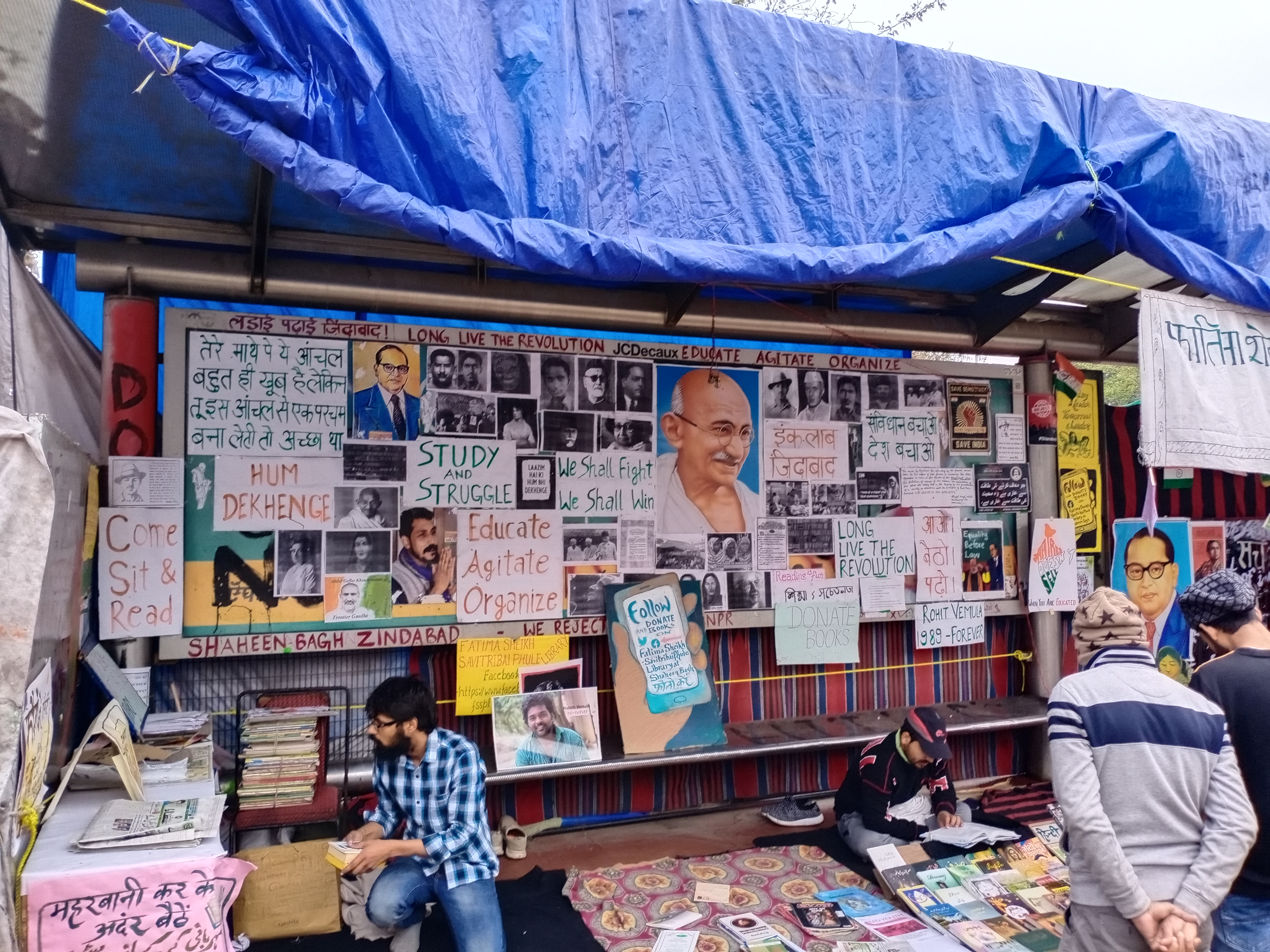
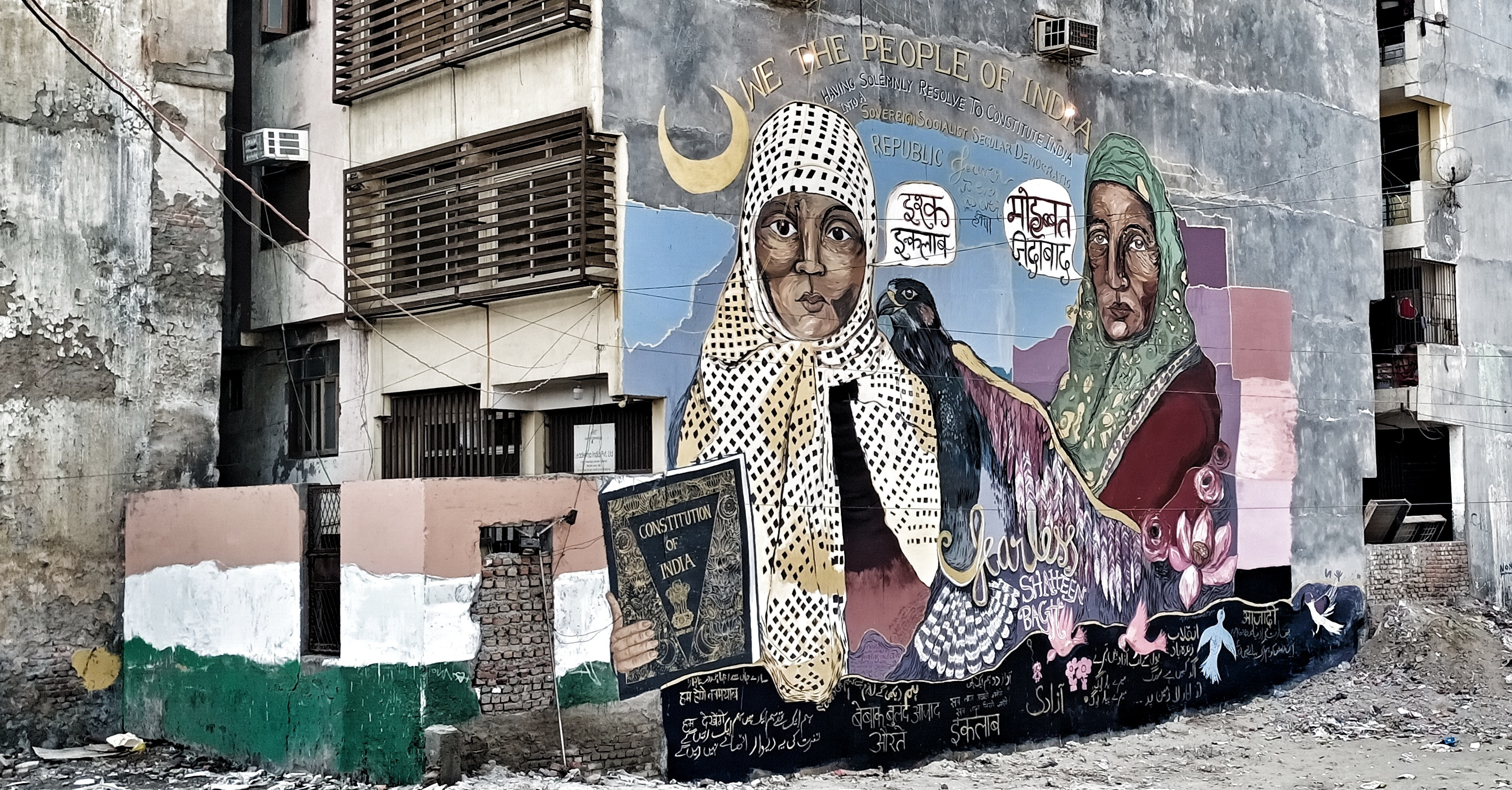
- Top left: A photo wall by JMI students; in background, an iron welded map of India built by protestors inscribed with a rejection of CAA-NRC-NPR
- Top right: India Gate mockup with names of those killed in anti-CAA protests
- Bottom left: Art depicting state oppression
- Bottom right: A bus stop converted into a library named after Fatima Sheikh and Savitribai Phule
- Bottom: A mural at Shaheen Bagh made during the protests. Visible— words from the Preamble, crescent moon symbolism, (transl.) long live revolution for love, Constitution of India, Shaheen Bagh's dadis (grandmothers), Shaheen falcon, India's tricolours (saffron, white, green), (transl.) brave, proud and free woman text; peace and freedom sybolism

Shaheen Bagh protestors and volunteers utilised protest art extensively. The protest area was covered in murals, graffiti, posters and banners. A number of scale models were installed, including one of a detention camp, symbolically depicting those used as a consequence of the NRC in Assam. A miniature replica of India Gate bore the names of those killed during the anti-CAA protests across India. Protestors built a 12-metre-high (40 ft) iron welded structure in the shape of India, painted with the message Hum Bharat ke log CAA-NPR-NRC nahi maante (We the people of India reject CAA-NPR-NRC). Hundreds of paper boats with the words of Hum Dekhenge (We will witness), a poem of resistance, were arranged as a heart and dwarfed by a tank representing state oppression. Posters proclaimed that the protesters were a bouquet, and not the lotus, the symbol of the ruling Bharatiya Janata Party.

Volunteers contributing to this outsider art included students from Delhi University, JMI, Jadavpur University and University of Hyderabad. A reading area called "Read for Revolution" had been set up with hundreds of crowd-sourced books as well as writing materials, drawing allusions to the JMI attack in which police forced themselves into the university's library and assaulted those inside. On 17 January, a bus stop was converted into a library named after Fatima Sheikh and Savitribai Phule, which provided material on the country's constitution, revolution, racism, fascism, oppression and various social issues.

Speeches, lectures and shayari poetry readings took place. Lines of poetry and nazm of revolutionary poets such as Faiz Ahmad Faiz, Pash, Habib Jalib, Muhammad Iqbal and Ramdhari Singh Dinkar were recited. Inter-faith prayers were held. Scriptures from the Geeta, the Bible, and the Quran were read, and Gurbani was held. Many street peddlers came to the site, including balloon vendors and chaatwallas (people cooking chaat from carts), giving the area a "lightness of festivity". Nearby eating establishments in Shaheen Bagh saw an influx of people with an increase in political conversations.

At the main protest tent in Shaheen Bagh, between 2 and 8 February 2020, a musical and cultural event called 'Artists Against Communalism' was held in solidarity with anti-CAA protest. Performers included Shubha Mudgal, T. M. Krishna, Madan Gopal Singh, Prateek Kuhad and Anushka Manchanda, and musical groups Advaita, Peter Cat Recording Co. and Rajasthani folk troupe Kutle Khan. Mudgal performed the song "Hamari Khwaishon ka Naam Inquilab Hain" (My dream is my revolution) and "Main nahin janta, main nahin manta" (I refuse to acknowledge, I refuse to accept) by Habib Jalib. Rapper Sumit Roy performed his viral rap music "Poorna Swaraj" (Complete freedom) and poet Amir Aziz recited "Main Inkaar Karta Hoon" (I refuse).

== Children at the protest ==
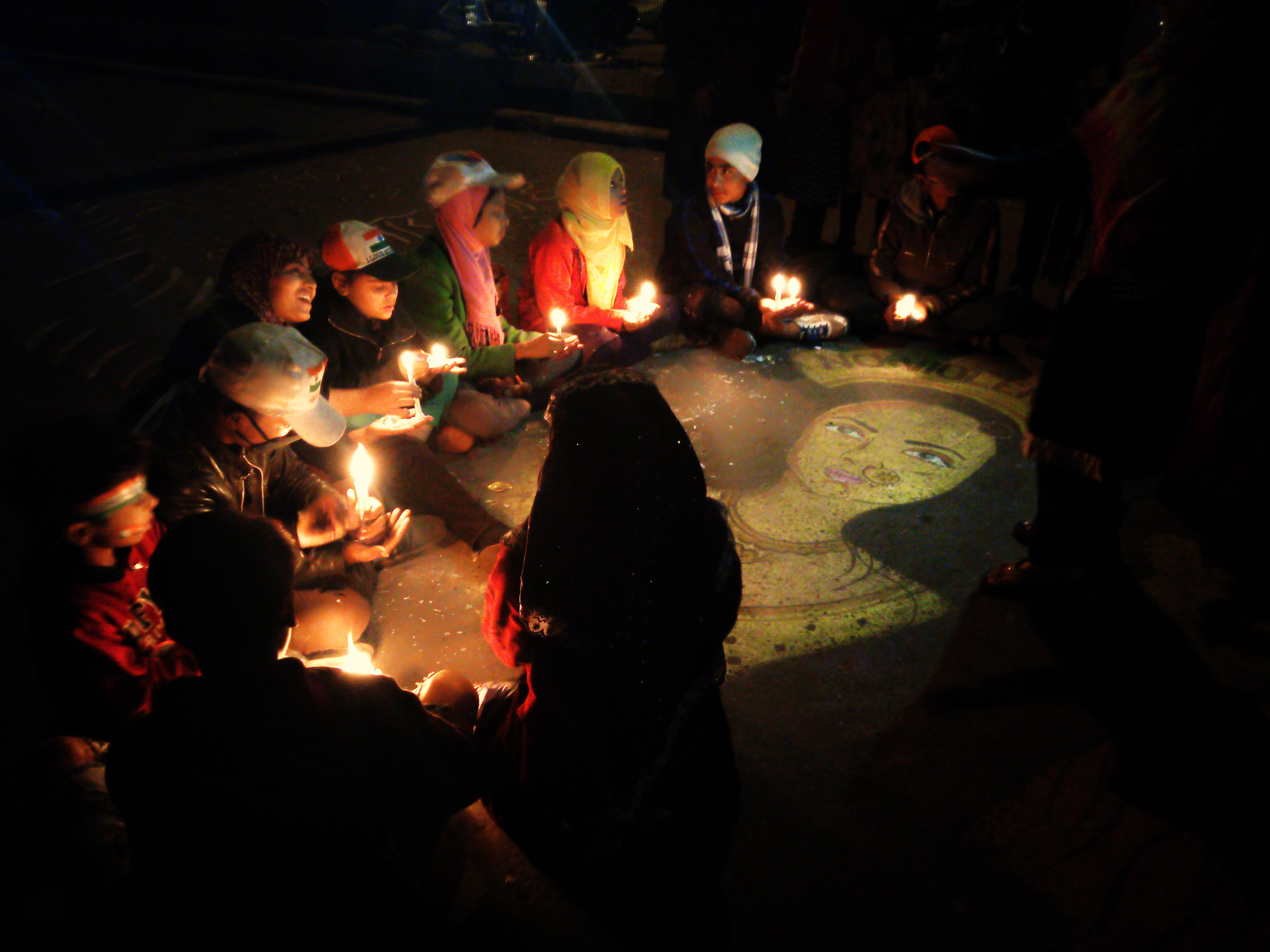
Children at Shaheen Bagh protest around artwork holding candles

From the first day, children were present alongside parents who participated in the protest. Most of these children would visit school in the morning before joining their parents at the protest site, which became an art space for many children. They would express their thoughts and join in the protest through storytelling, poetry, puppetry, singing and painting. Student and teacher volunteers engaged the local children in reading, painting and singing, and held informal reading lessons.

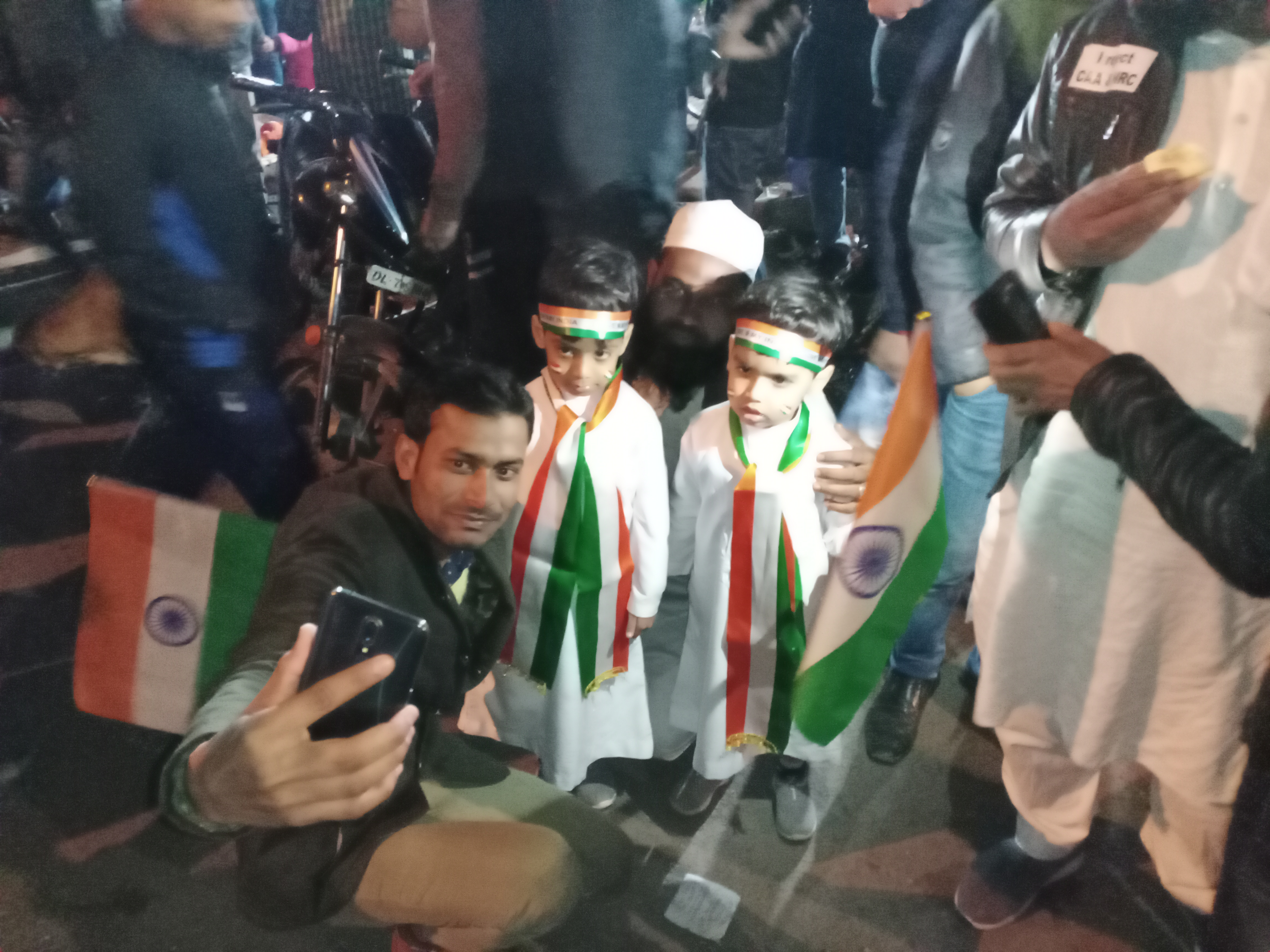
Children at the Shaheen Bagh protests dressed in tricolour

Children drew about issues such as the Australian wildfires and other things such as Deepika Padukone, Spider-Man and Disney Princesses. Some of the children would go to the stage with slogans such as "Hum kagaz nahin dikhayenge" (we won't show our papers). One of the most common pictures drawn by the children was that of the national flag. Scroll.in called the area an "open air art gallery".

On 21 January 2020, the National Commission for Protection of Child Rights, the top children's-rights body of India, asked authorities to provide counselling for children present at the protests. A complaint was received by the children's-rights body that the children had been misinformed by their parents about the CAA and detention centers. Some of these children were seen in viral videos of the protests shouting slogans. The District Magistrate of South East Delhi was informed of "mental trauma" the children may have undergone due to this. After an infant died at the protests the Supreme Court questioned the Union and state governments as to why a four-month year old child was at the protest. Shaheen Bagh put out a statement in this regard, "To say that a child is too immature to feel their oppression is to belittle and reduce oppression as something that can be felt only by those who understand its nuances". Earlier, West Bengal BJP chief Dilip Ghosh had expressed his surprise related to why nobody had died at the protest site till then considering that elderly women and children were protesting under difficult conditions.

== Efforts to remove blockade ==
Counter-protests against the Shaheen Bagh blockade were held with many locals wanting the roads to reopen. The Delhi High Court refused a plea on shifting the protesters from Shaheen Bagh. Another petition was filed by advocate Amit Sahni "seeking directions to withdraw the closure of Shaheen Bagh stretch" and give Delhi Police the required assistance in addressing the issue. The blocked road affected more than 100,000 vehicles per day, including around 1,800 trucks which are being diverted to other border points. On 14 January 2020, the Delhi High Court stated that it was a traffic matter to be dealt with by the police according to the larger public interest. The Delhi Police then stated that they would look into the restrictions caused by the protesters, which affect tens of thousands of commuters daily. Delhi Police made a statement saying that they "won't use force to evict protesters from Shaheen Bagh" and would use "persuasion". Talks between the protesters and the police failed and the protesters refused to move. The leaderless nature of the protests made it difficult to take any action.

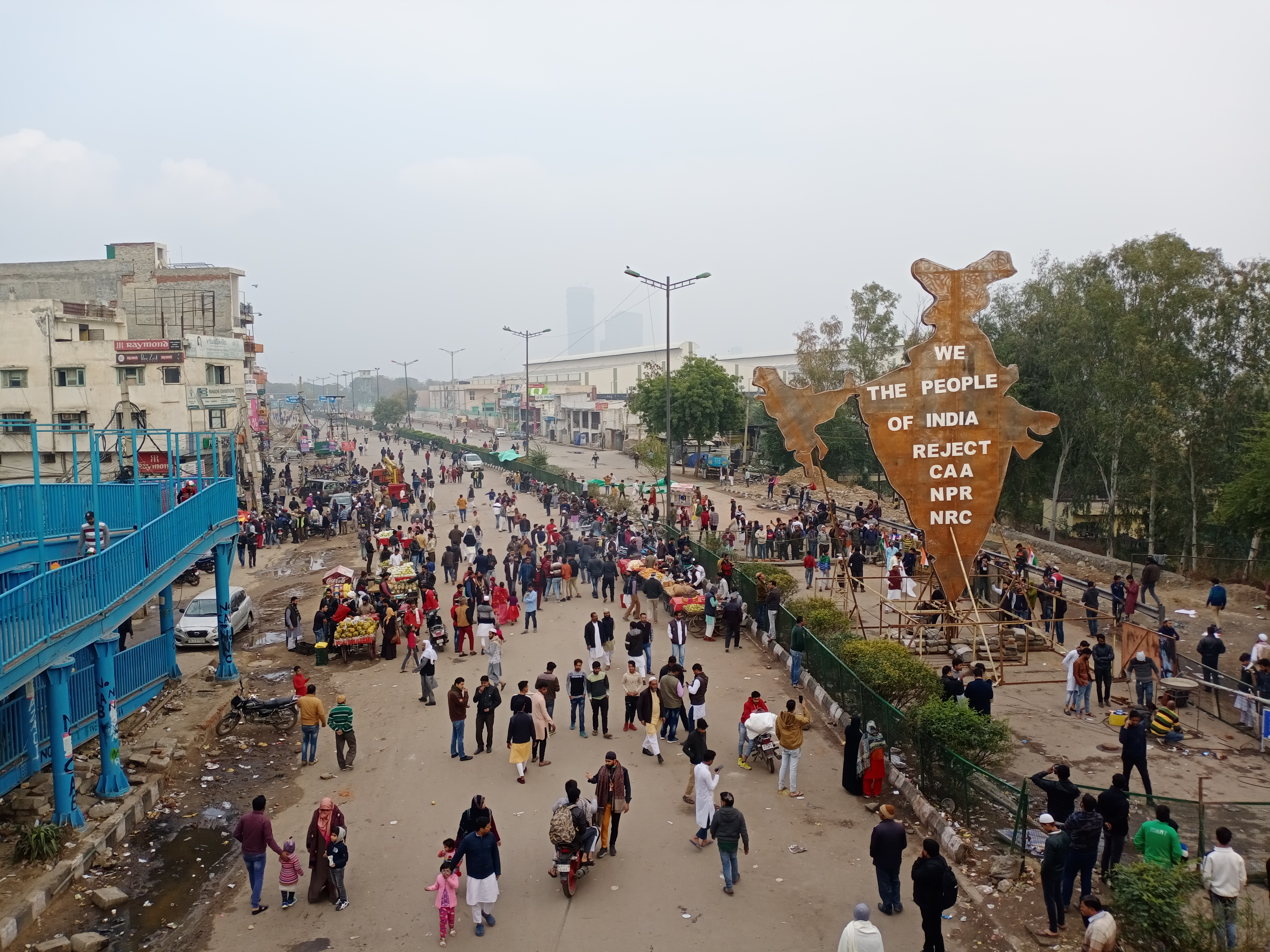
The protest site on GD Birla Marg

Delhi BJP chief Manoj Tiwari made a video appeal to the protesters to end the demonstration, noting that the road closure resulted in tens of thousands "completing a 25-minute journey in two-three hours", while stating that the CAA was not against any religion. Protesters responded that they would not budge until CAA is scrapped, but that they will help ease traffic, and said that they have opened the blockade for ambulances and would do so for school buses. There were various misleading claims by the media related to the protest. One of such claim was that the Delhi High Court ordered police to clear the protest site. The Times of India debunked a viral video which claimed there was a failed police crackdown at Shaheen Bagh; the video was from a CAA protest in East Delhi.

On 18 January, another petition was filed on behalf of the Sarita Vihar resident welfare association (RWA) for opening the road, with concerns regarding the upcoming student board exams in February and March. The High Court accordingly directed the police to look into the reasons for the closure. On 21 January, Baijal met a group of eight protesters who submitted a memorandum of demands. On 1 February, Union Minister Ravi Shankar Prasad said that the Narendra Modi government was ready to negotiate in a structured manner.

Commentators noted that the Shaheen Bagh was allowed to continue for as long as it did as it benefited the regime. Pratap Bhanu Mehta noted that, "In Delhi, the protests were allowed to continue in Shaheen Bagh, not because the government was soft. It thought it could use the protest as pretext to consolidate majoritarian sentiment: Look at these minorities blocking roads and standing against Hindu rights, went the refrain."

=== Police blockades ===
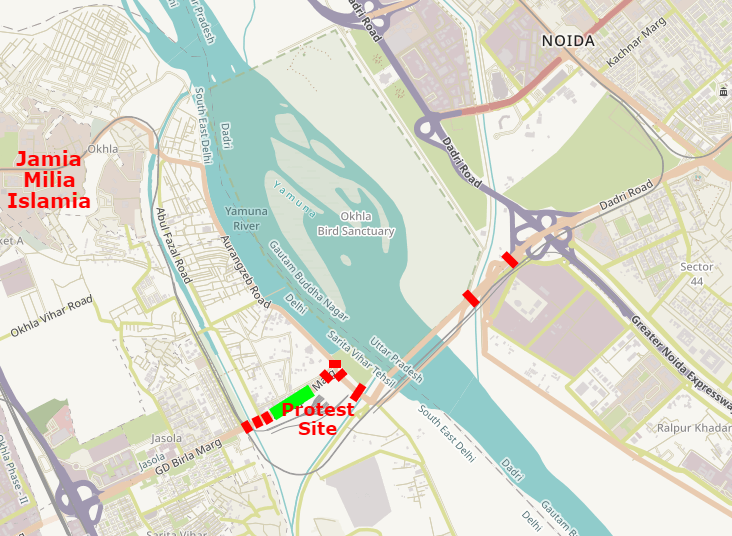
Shaheen Bagh protest site and surrounding barricades.

Scroll.in reported that the effect on traffic congestion was not merely due to the closure of GD Birla Marg where the protest site was, but also because two other connecting routes had been barricaded by Delhi and Uttar Pradesh (UP) police. Further, The Quint reported that while the protest occupied a small stretch of GD Birla Marg, police blocked both the whole road. Delhi Police called these restrictions "a security measure" explaining that as the main carriageways were blocked, the smaller connecting roads would not be able to handle the additional traffic, hence barricading them too became a compulsion. As Delhi Police placed barricades at entry point near Kalindi Kunj metro station blocking the entry of commuters from Noida into Delhi, UP Police did the same, in effect causing the closure of the six lane bridge. Delhi Police also blocked the entry of Khadar–Kalindi Kunj Road which connects Jamia Nagar and Noida to Faridabad. Following the North East Delhi riots, police barricading and presence in the area increased with over ten companies (1000 personnel) being deployed.

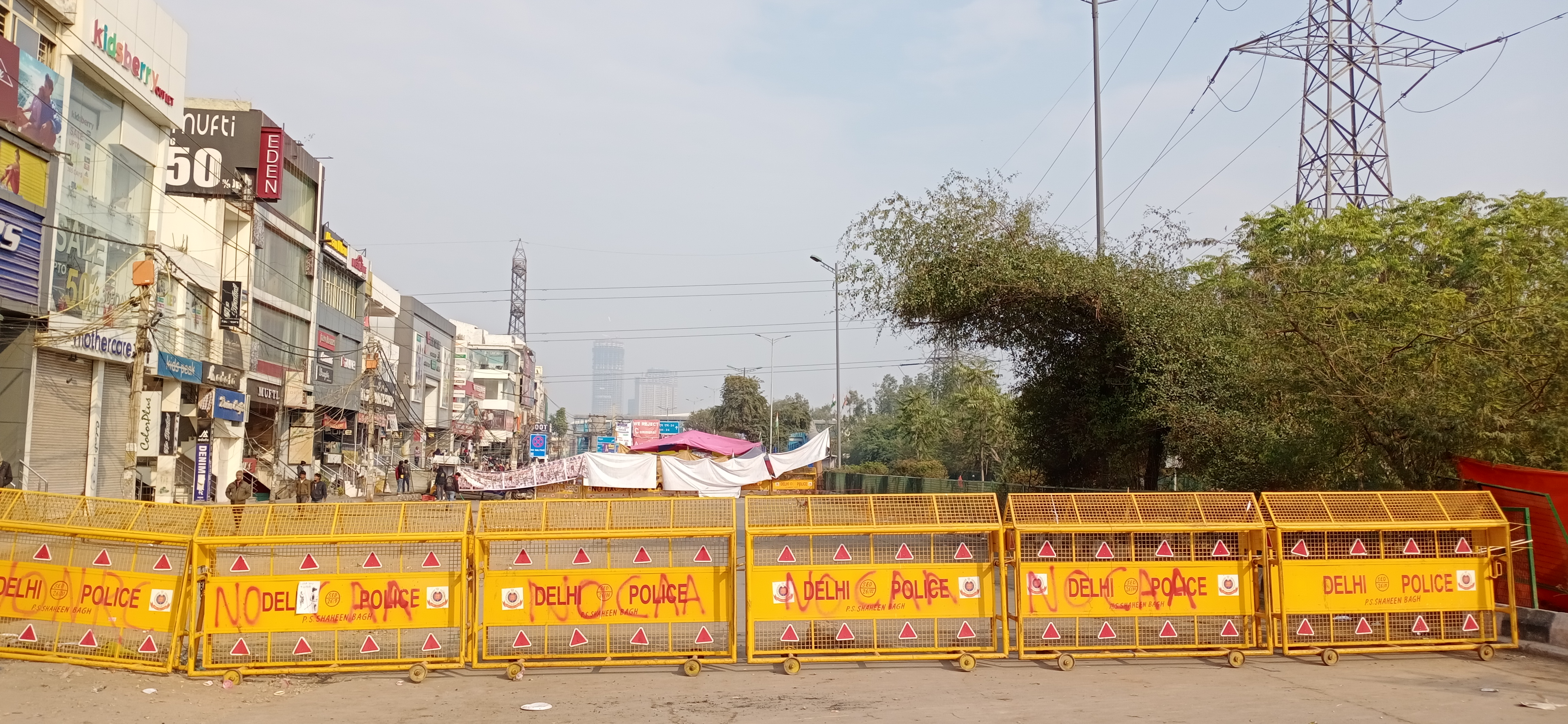
Police barricades blocking the carriage ways of GD Birla Marg

=== Petitions to the Supreme Court ===
A plea was filed to the Supreme Court of India requesting supervision to prevent any violence. The plea sought removal of the demonstration, citing that no one can be allowed to occupy a public road for a peaceful protest for an indefinite period such that others face inconvenience. Another petition to the Supreme Court was filed on 4 February 2020, by BJP leader Nand Kishore Garg, and sought an urgent hearing. On 7 February, the Supreme Court postponed the hearing until after the Delhi elections, scheduled for 8 February, so as not to influence the outcome. On 10 February, in its first hearing, the Court drew the attention of the protesters to the inconvenience caused over months of disruption. The court argued whether protests can be held in common areas indefinitely or if an area should be designated for protests, and considered the consequences of such protests held in public areas everywhere. However, the Court issued notices to the Central Government, the Delhi Government and the Delhi Police, stating that people have the "right to protest" though this couldn't be for "an indefinite period in a common area". The Court did not give any interim order and wanted to hear from the protesters.

On 17 February, the Supreme Court heard the plea which framed the matter as an issue of protests on public roads. Two interlocutors were chosen for engagement in dialogues with the protesters by the bench of justices S.K. Kaul and K. M. Joseph and the hearing was scheduled for 24 February 2020. The two interlocutors were senior advocates Sanjay Hegde and Sadhna Ramchandran. The Court also advised the interlocutors that they could seek assistance of former Chief Information Commissioner of India, Wajahat Habibullah, who filed an affidavit in the Court on the blockade. Habibullah in his affidavit stated that the precautionary blockade by police around the protest site was the cause for the traffic inconveniences, not the protestors. Hegde and Ramachandran examined the area and had several talk sessions with the protesters. On 24 February 2020, the interlocutors submitted the sealed cover report to the court. The bench received the report to examine the situation and scheduled the hearing for 26 February 2020. However, the Court postponed the hearing, following the North East Delhi riots which happened between 23 and 26 February 2020. The second round of talks between the interlocutors and the protesters took place on 5 March 2020. As a result of the COVID-19 pandemic the protests were conducted in a more controlled manner and were subsequently cleared by the police with minimal force on 24 March. The interlocutors came out came out with a statement requesting both parties, the government and the protestors, not to see the situation as "win or lose"; they emphasised that everyone's attention should be on the pandemic.

== Defamation attempts and fake news ==
The legitimacy of the protests were questioned in a number of ways. Media houses like Republic TV and OpIndia, considered as right-wing media, repeatedly questioned the number of protestors at the venue and showcased the protest site only when there were minimal protestors. This kind of reportage and social media depiction resulted in protestors at Shaheen Bagh saying, "Let us pledge that we don't speak to the state-sponsored media who instead of reporting the truth serve the interests of the regime."

=== Kashmiri Pandits' and Sikhs ===
"We feel the pain of Kashmiri Pandits who left everything back in Kashmir and ran. We the people of Shaheen Bagh stand in solidarity with them in their agony."

— A 40-year-old female protester at Shaheen Bagh.

The protestors confronted fake news spread about them. When misinformation was spread on the social media claiming that the Shaheen Bagh protestors would celebrate the deaths of Kashmiri Hindus on 19 January, the anniversary of the exodus of Kashmiri Hindus, the protestors rejected the claims. The protestors went on to invite Kashmiri Hindus to speak at the gathering, including M. K. Raina, and also observed a two-minute silence in solidarity.

Media houses were also required to fact check reports related to Sikhs at Shaheen Bagh. In March 2020, when the Kabul gurdwara attack took place in which 25 Sikh worshippers were killed, BJP leaders like Kapil Mishra tweeted on 25 March, "The Sikhs were providing free Biryani to Muslims protesting against CAA in Shaheen Bagh. Look what they did to them in Afghanistan". Following this some women of Shaheen Bagh posted a solidarity note on their Twitter account: "We, the women of #ShaheenBaghs all over India, strongly condemn the brutal terrorist attack on the Gurudwara in Kabul [...]".

=== Paid protest allegations ===
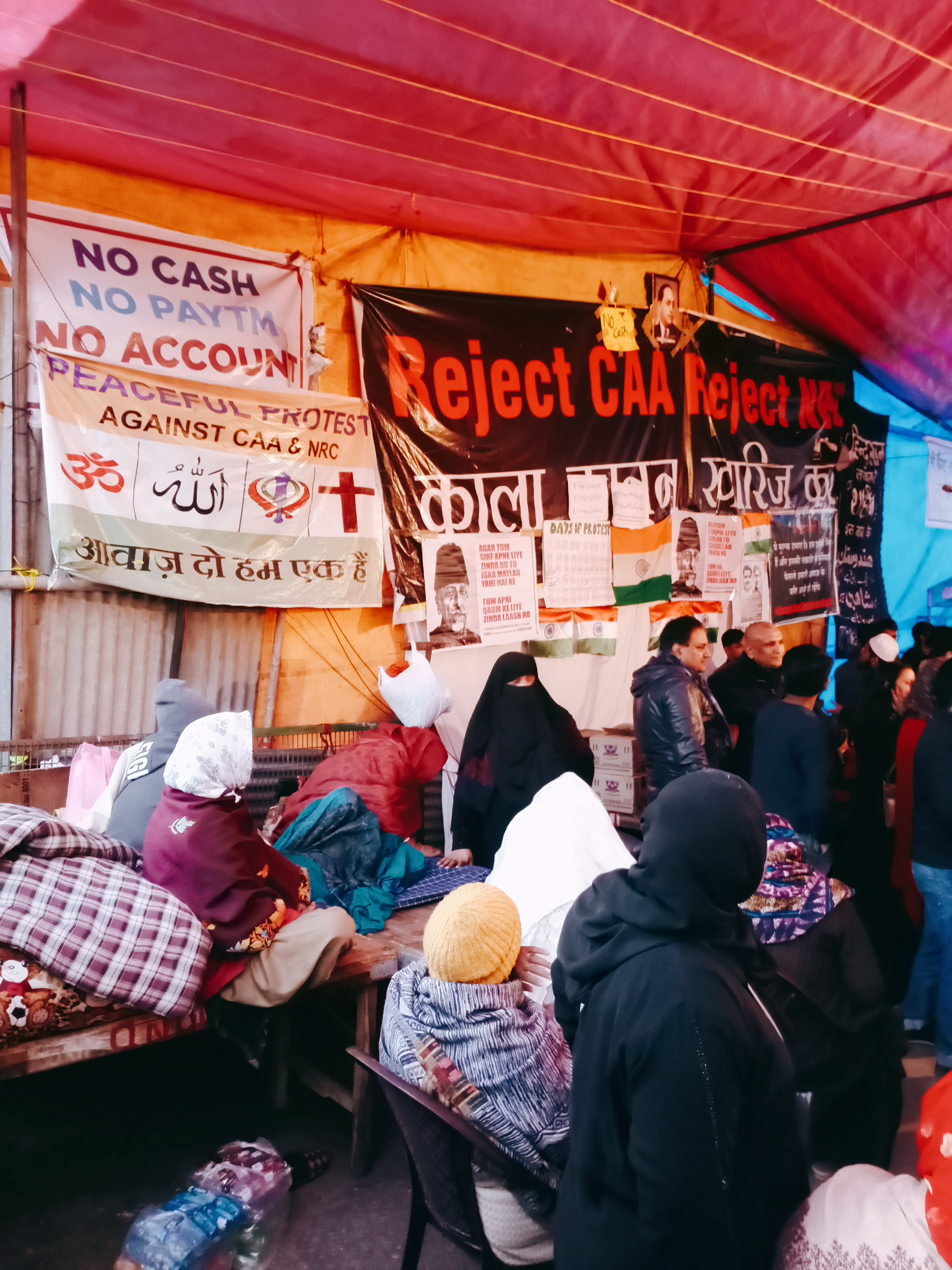
A poster at the protest reads: No Cash, No Paytm, No Account.

As the protest entered January, the BJP and its online supporters made claims that protesters were being paid. A doctored poster stating "fix rate Rs 500" went viral on social media platforms on 18 January 2020. This claim was debunked when independent website The Logical Indian released a fact check article on the same posters. The article unearthed the veracity of the real poster which says, "CAA wapas lo, NRC wapas lo" (English: Roll back CAA and NRC). On 15 January, Amit Malviya, BJP leader and head of IT cell, tweeted a video which claimed that the women protesters had been paid ₹500 to 700 to sit-in. The protest's official Twitter account released a statement and denied the claim. Posters at the site asked participants to not accept any amount of money and to not bribe anyone to participate. On 4 February 2020, Alt News and Newslaundry jointly released a fact-checking article in which the veracity of the video was debunked.

"We are not here to take Rs 500 rather we are here to protect our 500 years which our ancestors have dedicated for India."

— Asharfi, a 63-year-old protester.

Two protesters sent a defamation notice to Malviya which demanded an apology and ₹1 crore (equivalent to ₹1.3 crore or US$130,000 in 2026) in damages from the BJP IT cell chief. The notice stated that the addressees, "have not only played a fraud on the general public but have also attempted to bring disrepute to the protesters". Notices had also been sent to Republic TV, Zee News, Times Now, TV18 and News Nation with the same allegations.

== Inspiration for other similar protests ==
Location of some Shaheen Bagh inspired protests. Some locations like Delhi, Pune and Ranchi have Shaheen Bagh inspired protests in multiple locations. (Map is not exhaustive.) The Ministry of Home Affairs stated that in January and February 2020, the number of "unauthorised" protest sites increased from 9 to 291.
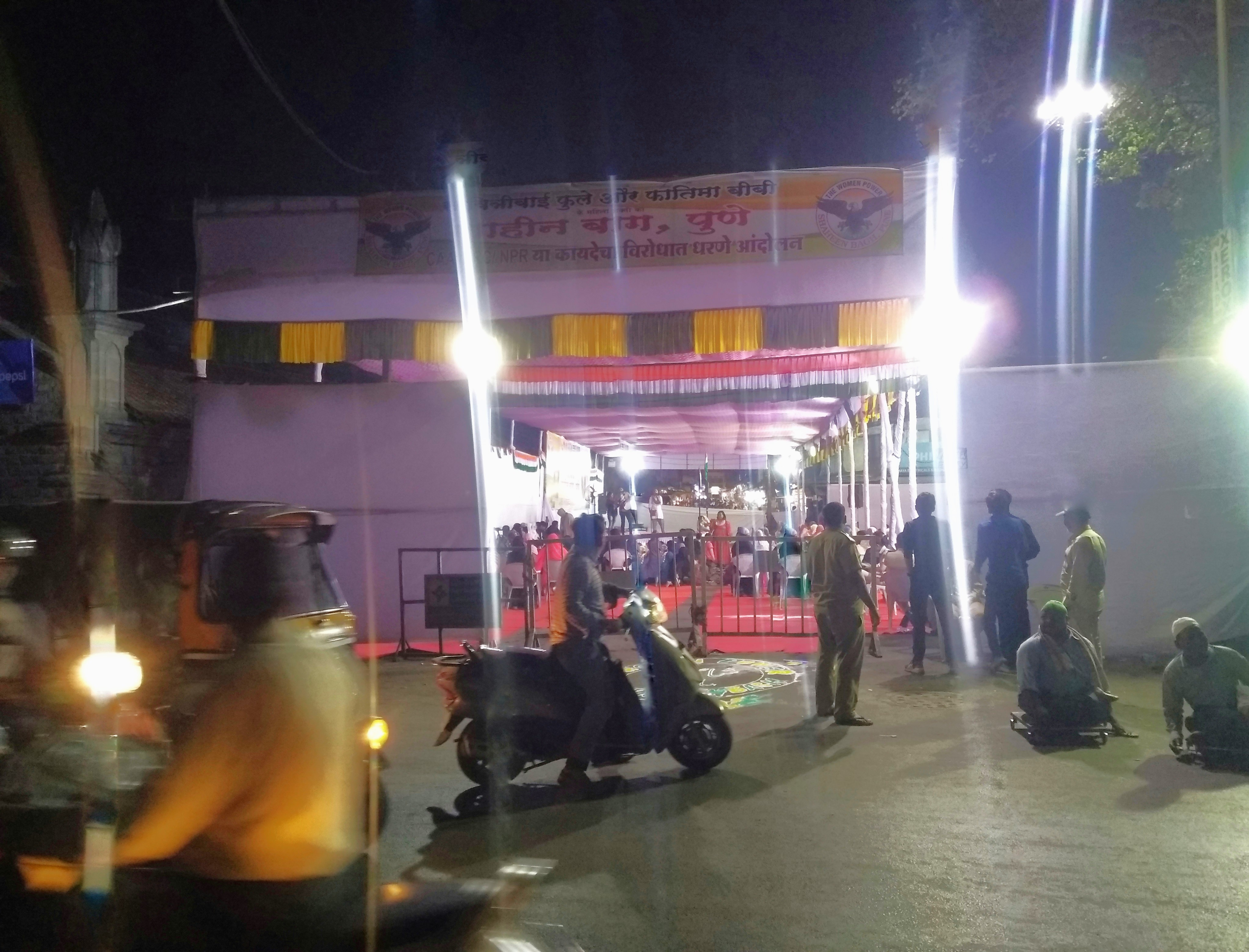
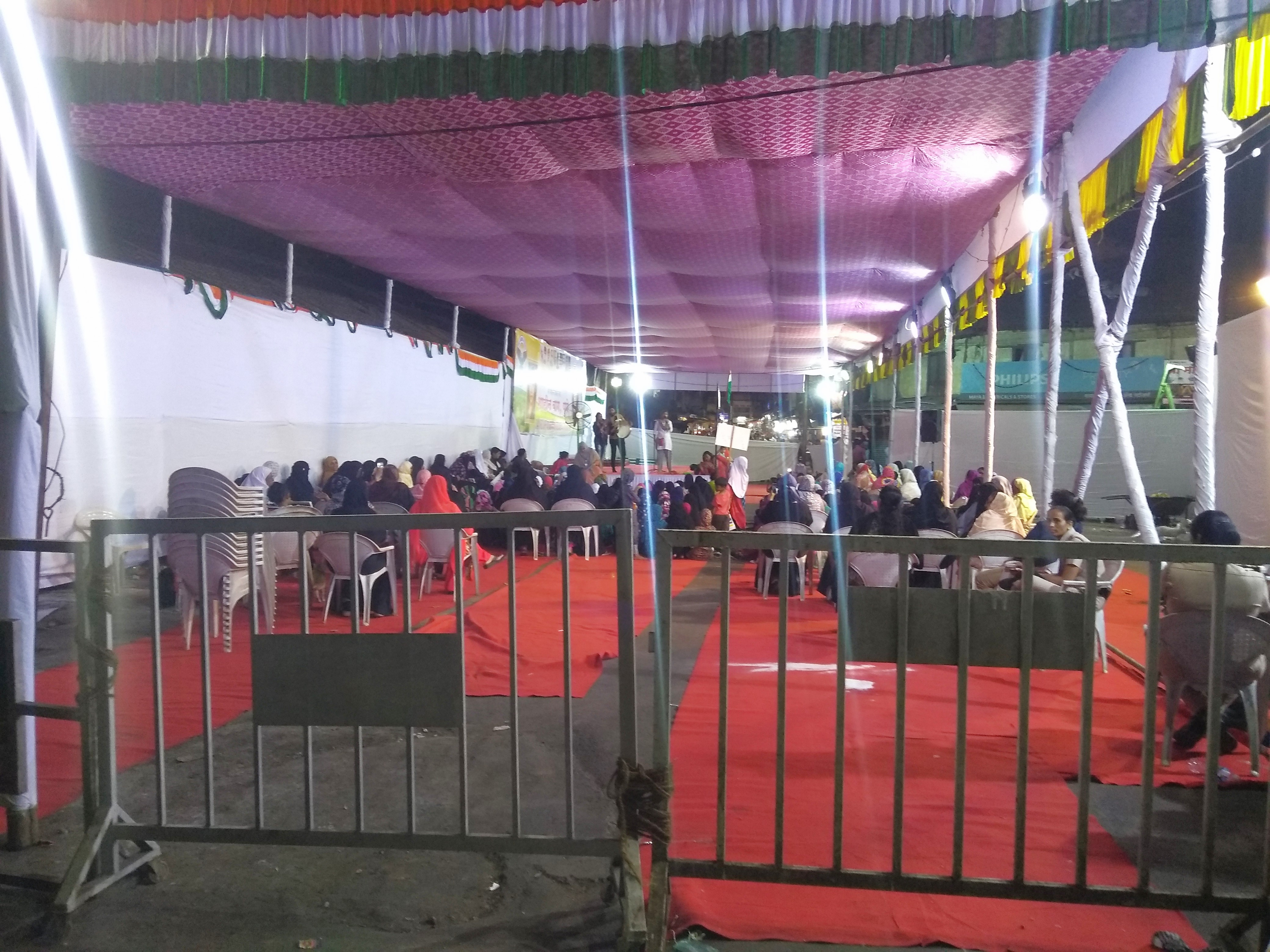
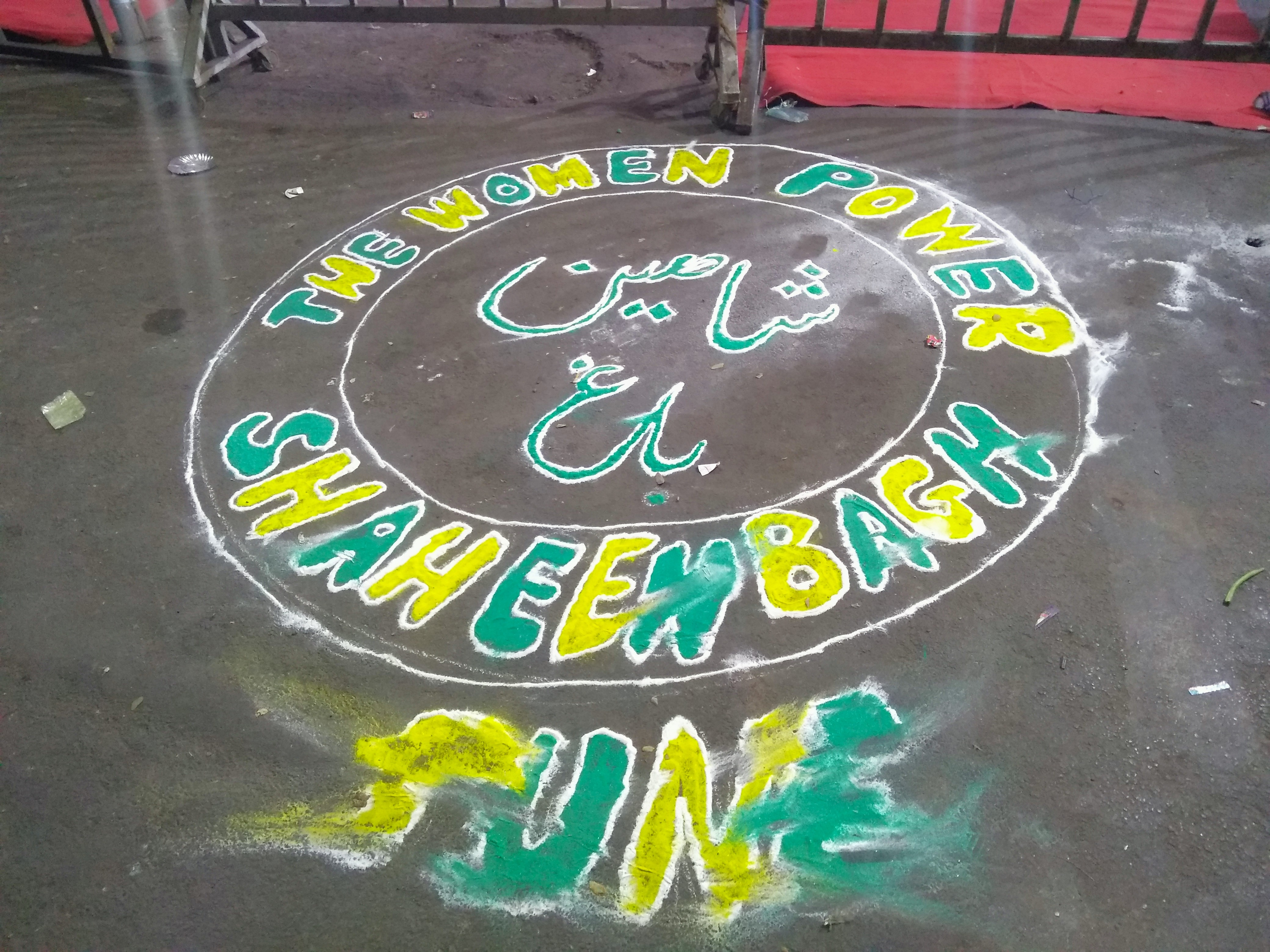
Shaheen Bagh protests against CAA, NRC and NPR in Pune on 22 January 2020

The Shaheen Bagh protest inspired several other similar protests in big cities around India. On 7 January 2020, female residents of Park Circus, Kolkata, gathered at Park Circus Maidan to voice their dissent against the CAA. It became one of the most organised protests against CAA-NRC. On request from the protesters, the West Bengal state government provided them with tents, bio-toilets, running water and lights so their protest could run continuously. Former Union Minister P. Chidambaram visited the protest and conducted a workshop there on CAA and NRC. Social activist Yogendra Yadav and singer Kabir Suman also visited to extend their support to the protesters.

On 11 January, an all-women sit-in protest started outside Konark Mall in Kondhwa, Pune, organised by Kul Jamaat-e-Tanzeem, an umbrella body of several organisations. This protest started with a few participants, growing to 500–600 protesters by 19 January. According to a protester the movement was to save the constitution and the country. Candle light vigils, human chains and speeches were part of the protest. The venue had banners with slogans such as "Tumhari Lathi Se Tej Hamari Awaaz Hai" (English: Our voice is louder than your batons) and "India Needs Education, Jobs, Not CAA, NRC, NPR".

On 12 January, a group of women started a CAA sit-in demonstration in Patna's Sabzibagh. Over the following three days, people of all ages gathered to join them in the protest. Also on 12 January, inspired by the women of Shaheen Bagh, groups of ten women began sit-in protests at the Mansoor Ali Park of Roshan Bagh, Allahabad. Over the next few days, thousands of women, students, and others sat through the rain and cold to join the resistance against the CAA–NRC through slogans, speeches and poems. Allahabad Police served notices to around 30 people in the protest.

Similar protests were held at Kanpur's Chaman Ganj, Gaya's Shanti Bagh, Kota's Eidgah ground, Lucknow's Clock Tower and Fraser Town in Bangalore. Inspired by the Shaheen Bagh protest, a large anti-CAA-NRC-NPR protest started in Mumbai on 17 January. Around 10,000 women gathered in the evening at the YMCA ground in Agripada, Mumbai to protest. The protest was organised by NGO collective Mumbai Citizen Quorum. On 20 January, an indefinite sit-in protest started at Parbhani, called "Parbhani bhi ek Shaheen Bagh", which was organised by Samvidhan Bachao Tahrik. Protests were also held in Bilal Bagh, Bangalore, Karnataka; Nagpada, Mumbai, Maharashtra; Anaj Mandi, Malerkotla, Punjab; Haj House, Ranchi, Jharkhand; Idgah ground, Deoband, Uttar Pradesh; Old Washermanpet, Chennai, Tamil Nadu; and Jaffrabad, Delhi.

== 2020 Delhi Assembly elections ==
The blockade at Shaheen Bagh became a campaign issue for the Delhi Legislative Assembly election, held on 8 February 2020. The BJP focused on a negative portrayal of Shaheen Bagh while Aam Aadmi Party (AAP) mostly stayed clear of the protests and focused on good governance. In relation to the Shaheen Bagh and CAA protests, Prime Minister Modi of the ruling BJP said on 3 February 2020,

The people of Delhi are quiet and they are angry watching this vote bank politics [...] If the strength of those plotting a conspiracy increases, then another road or lane will be blocked. We can't leave Delhi to such anarchy. Only people of Delhi can stop this. Every vote given to the BJP can do this [...] Be it Seelampur, Jamia (Nagar) or Shaheen Bagh, for the last several days, there have been protests over the Citizenship (Amendment) Act. Are these protests coincidental. No, this is not coincidental, it is an experiment...

Chief Minister of Delhi Arvind Kejriwal of the AAP and Home Minister of India Amit Shah of the BJP criticised each other over their positions on the protest. On 27 January, during an election rally, Shah asked Kejriwal whether "he is with the people of Shaheen Bagh or not" as some AAP party members had publicly sided with the protesters. Kejriwal accused the BJP of using "dirty politics" by prolonging the road closures to cause a public backlash against the protesters. Union Law Minister Ravi Shankar Prasad (BJP) said that Shaheen Bagh was offering a platform for the "anti-India" gangs. Several BJP leaders and politicians made hate speeches against the protesters, including Yogi Adityanath, Anurag Thakur and Parvesh Verma.

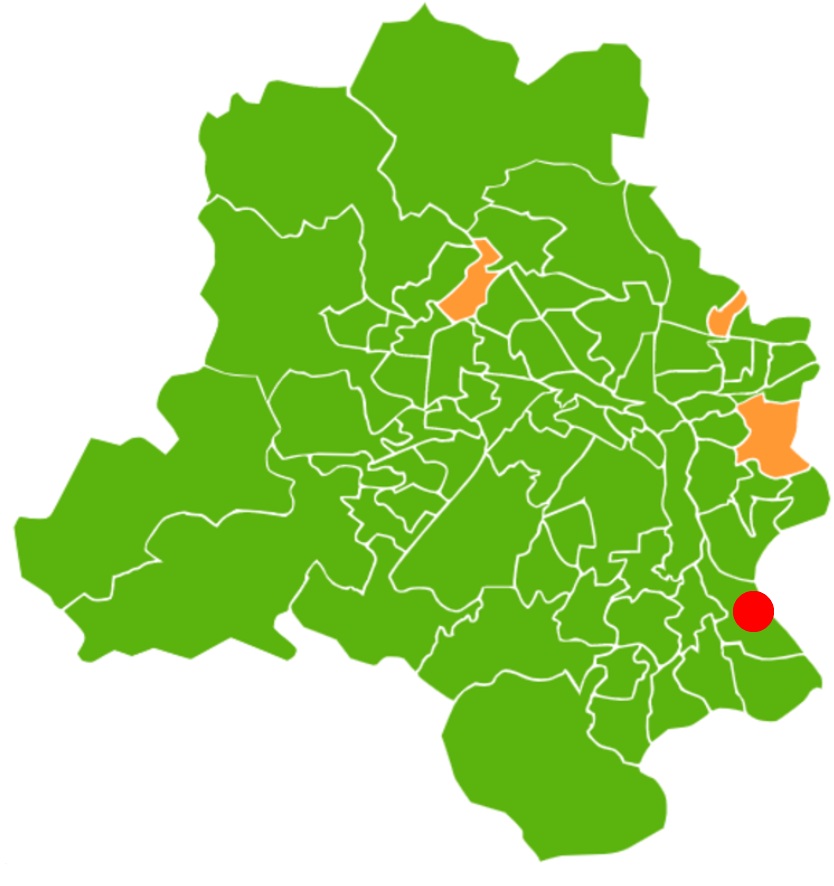
Results of the 2015 Delhi Legislative Assembly election

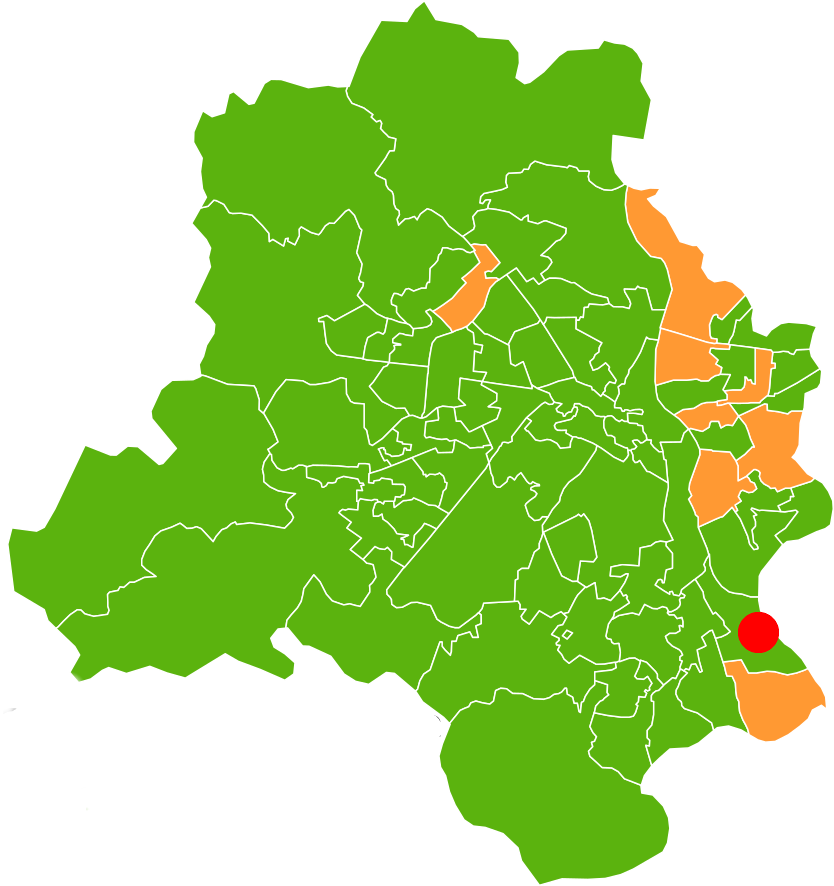
Results of the 2020 Delhi Legislative Assembly election

Green represents AAP. Orange represents BJP. Okhla (Delhi Assembly constituency) and Shaheen Bagh represented by the red dot.

AAP won with 62 out of the 70 seats. The AAP did lose six seats to BJP. One of the factors for this was referenced to the Shaheen Bagh protests. However, Shaheen Bagh did not have the impact on the elections that the BJP wanted and the party won much fewer seats than expected. Amit Shah said that this may be due to certain statements made during the election campaigning. In Okhla, the constituency of Delhi in which the Shaheen Bagh protest was occurring, voters reelected its Muslim leader and AAP candidate Amanatullah Khan with a clear majority of 66% of the total votes.

=== Threats to the protesters ===
BJP MP Parvesh Verma (BJP) made hateful and abusive comments about the Shaheen Bagh protesters, and claimed that they would be cleared within an hour of the election results being declared on 11 February. Verma was later penalised by the Election Commission and BJP for his comments. Several other BJP leaders made statements regarding removal of the protesters from Shaheen Bagh. One said that a "surgical strike" would be conducted on the protesters. Hindu Sena stated that they would remove all "Shaheen Bagh Jihadis" at 11 am on 2 February. This plan was cancelled after consultations with the Delhi Police.

On 28 January 2020, an armed man entered the Shaheen Bagh protest site, climbed the stage, and threatened people to stop the agitation; he was later overpowered by protesters. On 1 February, a Hindu fundamentalist entered the barricaded area and fired a gun three times into the air near the stage. He shouted the slogan Jai Shri Ram and said no one other than Hindus will have a say in this country; he was taken into police custody and later released on bail. The incident happened two days after a Hindu fundamentalist shot and injured a student protester in the presence of police near Jamia Millia Islamia. The alleged perpetrator of the Jamia incident had made various threatening and hateful social media posts, including one in which he threatened to convert "Shaheen Bagh into Jallianwala Bagh", the site of a massacre. On 2 February 2020, the Election Commission of India transferred the then deputy commissioner of police for South East Delhi, citing the multiple shooting incidents in the Jamia area, which was an election polling area. Amit Shah made a statement after the elections in which he said that some remarks in relation to Shaheen Bagh such as "goli maaro" and "India vs Pakistan" should not have been made.

== Impact of coronavirus pandemic ==
Following the spread of the coronavirus in India in 2020 the women at Shaheen Bagh were provided with masks and sanitisers. However, the Chief Minister of Delhi made it clear that restrictions were in place in Delhi as per the Epidemic Diseases Act, 1897 and this applied to protests too. Schools, colleges, malls, weekly markets, cinema halls and gatherings of more than 50 people had been banned in Delhi. The Chief Minister made it clear that those who did not comply with the Act would be punished. In response to this the coordinators stated that "the order of shut down has come for entertainment services, while Shaheen Bagh is agitation and fight for survival" and that only a Supreme Court order could get them to move; it was a choice between protesting for their rights versus civic responsibility. As a precautionary measure the protesters planned for a "controlled gathering".

The protest followed the "Janata Curfew", announced by the Prime Minister on 22 March 2020, by reducing the number of protesters to 5 and symbolically leaving behind cots and sandals by other protesters at the site in solidarity. However, a complete lockdown was imposed in Delhi by Chief Minister Arvind Kejriwal from 23 to 31 March 2020, following which the protesters were removed by the Delhi police on 24 March 2020, 101 days after the start of the protest. The police arrested the remaining few protesters who were present there as they refused to leave the site.

In 2021, when Delhi was facing the second wave of the COVID-19 pandemic and hospitals were in dire need of oxygen, this epicentre of anti-CAA protests saw a new transformation — welding Shops in the area turned into free oxygen cylinder distribution and refilling centres.

== Aftermath ==
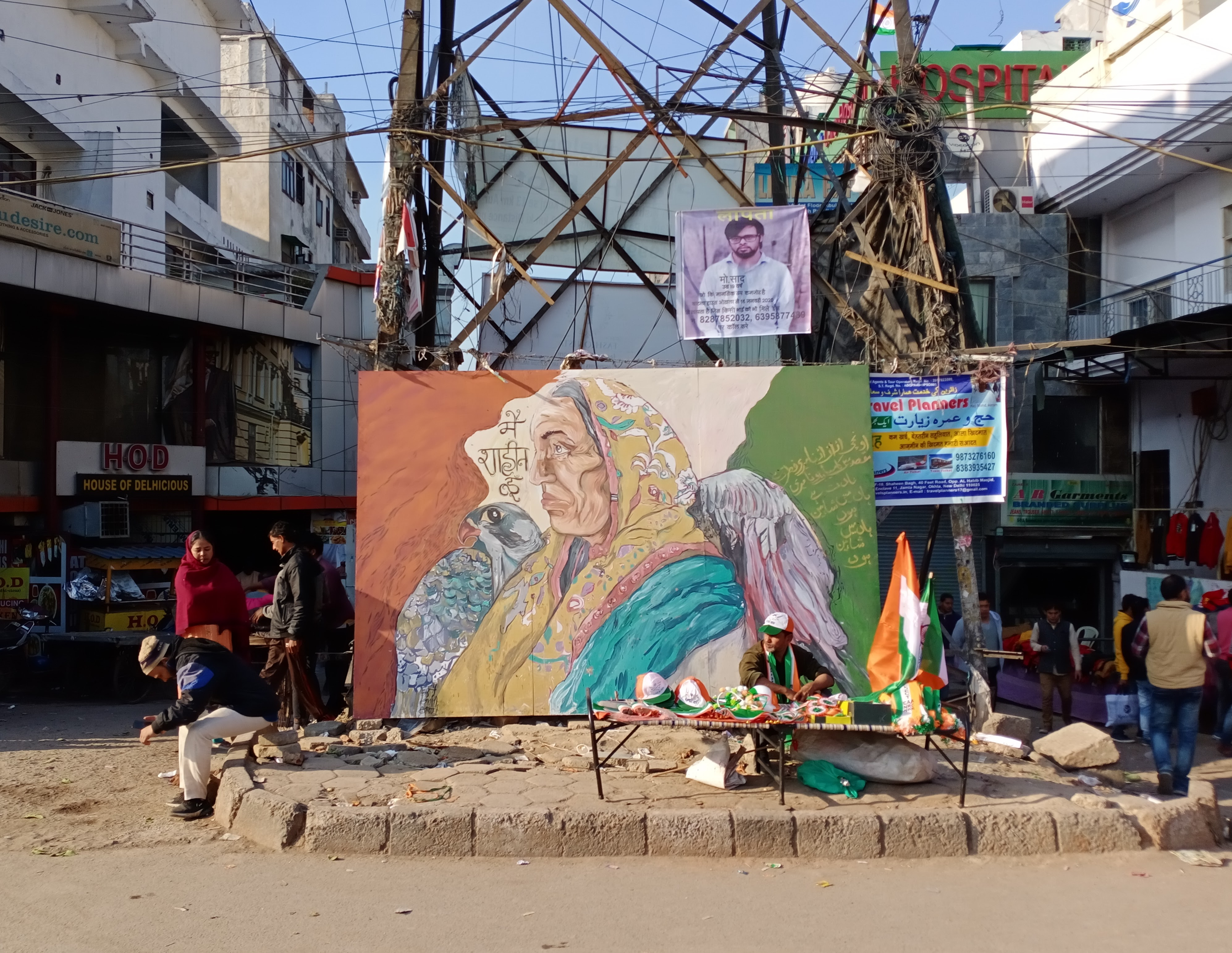
Artwork at Shaheen Bagh during the protests. Representation of the Shaheen Bagh dadi's (grandmothers) and the Shaheen falcon.

=== Protest site ===
Following the removal of protestors on 24 March 2020, the government also removed the art installations and painted the graffiti white. On 9 October 2020, Indian Express reported that the only remains at the protest site were some graffiti and posters (missed by the government). Some of the shops that had been shut as a result of the protests followed by COVID-19 were open. Numerous remain closed. Regular police patrols are present in the area. During the 2020–2021 farmers protest police presence significantly increased in the area, a local explained, "No government wants a repeat of what happened last year".

=== Attainment of goals ===
One of the goals of Shaheen Bagh was to get CAA revoked. In this aspect they were not successful. Indian political scientist Sanjay Kumar commented that "the fact that women, children and families came together for a cause was unique. It was an example of how protests can be undertaken if people are committed". However he went on to say "It did not achieve anything". Mohammed Ayoob wrote on 3 February 2020 that while the protestors had successfully stood up against the government narrative it was "time for the Shaheen Bagh protests to end". Pratap Bhanu Mehta wrote on 10 March 2020 that the Shaheen Bagh protestors had reached a "strategic (a) dead end" and that at best, the Shaheen Bagh movement is a "curiosity"— "The anti-CAA protests gave us the poetry to resist. But the hard plumbing of an alternative politics is yet to be worked out". An editorial from Hindustan Times said that the protests would "go down as historic" but added, "Now, find other ways to dissent".

=== Protestors ===
Bilkis Dadi, one of the Shaheen Bagh protestors, was included by Time magazine in its list of "The 100 Most Influential People of 2020". In a statement to Indian Express in October 2020, she said "Nobody here talks about the protest or is willing to talk about it anymore. They're scared." On 23 November 2020, Bilkis was also listed in BBC's 100 Women list. She went on to be listed as the 'Woman of the Year' in the 2021 edition of The Muslim 500— "Starting a simple Gandhian sit-in protest on a road in her locality of Shaheen Bagh in Delhi, she managed to bring the world's attention to the latest signpost in India's slide into Hindutva, 'majoritarianism', 'Hindu nationalism' or 'fascism, Hindu style'." Karuna Nundy tweeted "Dadi' Bilkis Bano's and her reclamation of the Constitution in Shaheen Bagh was one of the most inspiring acts this year."

Around August 2020, some people associated with the Shaheen Bagh protest joined BJP. On 30 December, the Hindu fundamentalist shooter, who was temporarily detained for firing at the Shaheen Bagh protest site, officially joined the Bharatiya Janata Party. After a few hours when the news of his joining the party broke out, he was expelled from the party. Sharjeel Imam was considered as one of the 'masterminds' of the protest by Delhi Police.

=== Supreme Court ===
In response to a petition filed in February in the Supreme Court seeking lifting of the blockade due to the Shaheen Bagh protests, Justices Sanjay Kishan Kaul, Aniruddha Bose and Krishna Murari concluded on 7 October 2020 that "such kind of occupation of public ways, whether at the site in question or anywhere else for protests is not acceptable and the administration ought to take action to keep the areas clear of encroachments or obstructions". The Supreme Court stated on a batch of petitions against Shaheen Bagh that "indefinite" occupation of public space for protest or expressing dissent was not acceptable. A review petition was dismissed by the court in February 2021.

== See also ==
- Chipko Movement
- Irom Chanu Sharmila
- 2020 Women's March
- Yellow vests movement
- No NRC movement

== Photographs ==
- Media related to Shaheen Bagh protests at Wikimedia Commons
