= Bilkis Dadi =

Indian activist

- Born: 1 January 1938 (age 88); Hapur, Uttar Pradesh, British Raj
- Other names: The Dadi of Shaheen Bagh
- Known for: Shaheen Bagh protests

Bilkis Bano, nicknamed Bilkis Dadi (lit. transl. 'Grandmother Bilkis'), is an Indian activist who was at the forefront of protests against the Citizenship (Amendment) Act, 2019 (CAA) passed by the central Government of India. She received national and international coverage during the sit-in protest in Shaheen Bagh in Delhi. For her role in the Shaheen Bagh protest, she came to be known as one of the 'Dadis of Shaheen Bagh' (English: Grandmothers of Shaheen Bagh) and went on to be listed on the Time 100 list and BBC's 100 Women in 2020. She was named "Woman of the Year" in The World's 500 Most Influential Muslims for 2020.

== Life ==
Bilkis was born on 1 January 1938 in a village in Hapur district of Uttar Pradesh, India. She received no formal education and grew up reading the Quran. Vice summarizes her life— "She spent her life raising her six children, farming and rearing cattle". Her husband died when she was in her early 70s. She lives in Shaheen Bagh, Delhi, with her daughters-in-law and grandchildren.

== Activist career ==
Bilkis sat with two of her friends, Asma Khatoon (90) and Sarwari (75), and hundreds of Muslims under a canopied tent at Shaheen Bagh, blocking a major highway in Delhi, for over three months. Bilkis and her two friends came to be known as the Dadis of Shaheen Bagh (English: Grandmothers of Shaheen Bagh). The other woman of Bilkis' joint family also took turns to participate in the protest. Bilkis herself did not miss a day of the protest. In Delhi's winter, she sat at the protest site from 8 in the morning every day. She also took part in the open-mics at the protest site. The protest started in response to police violence in Jamia Millia Islamia university located near Shaheen Bagh— "We continued our sit-in even as it rained or mercury dropped or temperature shot up. We had been sitting ever since our kids were thrashed in Jamia. Shots were fired in front of us, yet nothing deterred us".

In an interview published in Livemint, she said that it is the idea of a pluralist India that she and her late husband grew up with that she is fighting for, "despite all odds ... They passed the Babri Masjid verdict, triple talaq law, demonetization, we didn't say anything, but we will not stand for this division." During the 2020–2021 Indian farmers' protest, Bilkis tried to join the protests but was escorted away by the police. She expressed solidarity with the farmers at an event at Press Club of India. Many news outlets including OpIndia and Zee News have criticized her, calling her a cover for radical and separatist elements and a "sympathiser of anti-India forces".

== Recognition ==
On 23 September 2020, she was included in Time magazine's Time 100 list of the 100 most influential people in 2020 in the icons category. In her profile, journalist and author Rana Ayyub described her as 'the voice of the marginalised'. In November 2020, BBC listed Bilkis Dadi in the list of 100 inspiring and influential women from around the world for 2020. BBC quotes her saying "Women should feel empowered to step out of their homes and raise their voice, especially against injustice. If they don't leave their homes, how will they showcase their strength?" Bilkis shared the Quaid Millat Award for Honesty in Politics/Public Life 2020 with Karwan-e-Mohabbat.

She was featured in the 2021 edition of The Muslim 500: The World's 500 Most Influential Muslims which named her "Woman of the Year". The page long explanation says— "Starting a simple Gandhian sit-in protest on a road in her locality of Shaheen Bagh in Delhi, she managed to bring the world's attention to the latest signpost in India's slide ... ." Gal Gadot called Bilkis as one of her "personal wonder women" commenting "the 82-year-old activist fighting for women's equality in India showed me it's never too late to fight for what you believe in".
