= Black shaheen =

Black Shaheen may refer to:

- (Black) Shaheen Falcon (Falco peregrinus peregrinator), South Asian subspecies of peregrine falcon
- Black Shaheen, variant of the Storm Shadow cruise missile
