= Shaheen Bagh =

Neighbourhood in Delhi, India

- Neighborhood of Delhi
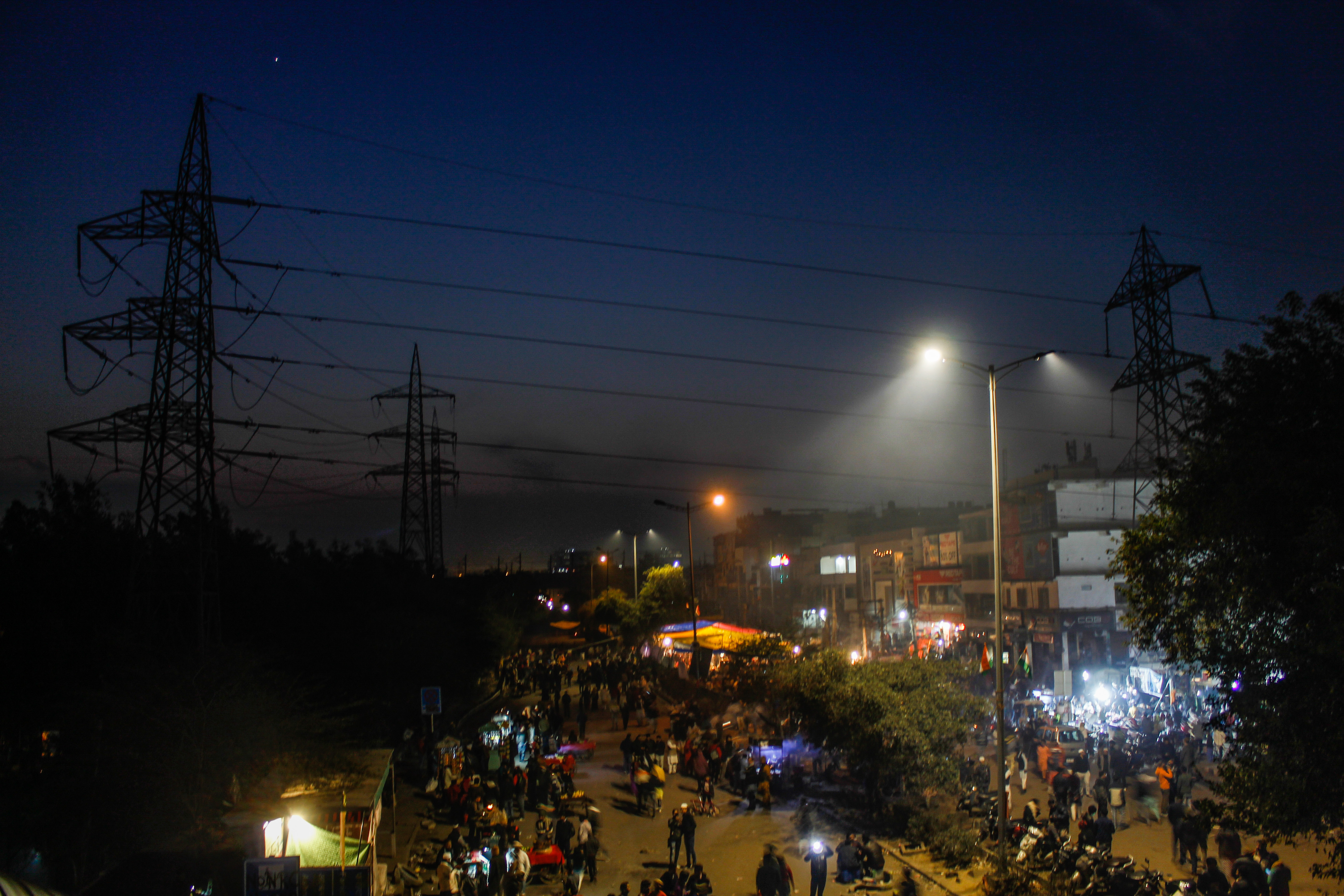
- Shaheen Bagh at night

- Location in Delhi, India
- Coordinates: 28.5513°N 77.2970°E
- Country: India
- State: Delhi
- District: South Delhi

Languages
  - Official: Hindi; English
  - Additional official: Punjabi; Urdu
- Time zone: UTC+5:30 (IST)
- PIN: 110025
- Vehicle registration: DL
- Planning agency: Municipal Corporation of Delhi

Map showing the nine districts of Delhi.

Shaheen Bagh is a neighbourhood in the South East Delhi district of Delhi, India. It is on the U.P border and southernmost colony of the Okhla (Jamia Nagar) area, situated along the banks of the Yamuna. The locality is known for being the site of gathering for the protest against the Citizenship (Amendment) Act (CAA), National Register of Citizens (NRC) and National Population Register (NPR). Shaheen Bagh is recognised as one of the areas in Delhi with a significant Muslim population.

== Etymology ==
Shaheen Bagh is named after the Shaheen falcon, with Shaheen itself being a Persian word. The name was chosen from a poem of Allama Iqbal's (Muhammad Iqbal) called Bal-e-Jibril (Gabriel's Wing). The area started to be populated in the early to mid 1980s.

== History ==
Shaheen Bagh is the newest inhibitation in Jamia Nagar, which became populated after mid-1980s. Previously agricultural land, the Hindu Gujjar community developed plots for sale, drawing residents due to affordability compared to nearby Jamia Nagar. Many people earning petro-dollars in Arab countries bought property here. Early infrastructure was limited, lacking proper roads, sewage systems, and electricity.

The 1992 Babri Masjid demolition triggered a population shift, with Muslims from mixed localities seeking refuge in Shaheen Bagh. This influx led to a denser, more diverse community. Residents include working-class individuals like construction workers and tradespeople, alongside professors from Jamia Millia Islamia and businessmen.

=== Protest site ===
This place is widely known for the Shaheen Bagh protest held during the nationwide movement against the CAA, NRC and NPR. The protests were mainly led by Muslim women of Shaheen Bagh in a form sit-in for more than 4 months. They blocked the highway connecting Noida inspired by the call of Sharjeel Imam for 'Chakka Jam' (traffic block).

== Neighborhood ==
Shaheen Bagh's population is diverse, with residents originating from various Indian states like Uttar Pradesh, Bihar, Rajasthan, Madhya Pradesh, and Haryana. The Muslim community within the area exhibits a variety of Islamic beliefs. The architectural landscape of Shaheen Bagh is characterised by midrise apartment buildings constructed on relatively narrow plots of land, ranging from 25 to 400 sq. meters.

Shaheen Bagh has a high concentration of private schools, which are built on small plots of 200-300 square yards. Being a predominantly Muslim neighbourhood, it has numerous mosques and Islamic institutions scattered throughout the locality.

== Market ==
The road linking Kalindi Kunj Road to Allama Shibli Nomani Road, known as 40 Feet Road or Chaalis Futa Road saw a rise in cafes and biryani stalls catering to protesters. Social media increased the area's reputation, attracting foodies seeking Mughlai cuisine alongside Arabic, Afghan, Turkish, and Italian fare. New Delhi's well-known Mughlai food eateries have opened here in the last three years influencing Shaheen Bagh's position as a major culinary hub.

In addition to its known culinary offerings, Shaheen Bagh is also a hub for factory outlets of various clothing brands. These outlets can be found in the lane adjoining the main road, GD Birla Marg.

== Connectivity ==
This area has connectivity to nearby commercial and official areas such as Noida, Nehru Place, Sarita Vihar, Jasola, Okhla Industrial Area, Kalindi Kunj and Okhla Railway Station. It also has connectivity to universities like Jamia Millia Islamia, Jamia Hamdard, and Amity University. A metro train railway station named as Jasola Vihar Shaheen Bagh metro station connects Shaheen Bagh to the Delhi metro network. Buses for major routes start from nearby Kalindi Kunj.
