= No NRC movement =

2019 – 2020 protests in India

No NRC movement was originated in West Bengal, after the National Register of Citizens for Assam (NRC Assam) Draft List was published in 2018. It predated the Citizenship Amendment Act protests and created the conditions for protests against the CAA to grow, especially in West Bengal. The NRC Assam Final Draft List, published on 30 July 2018, has excluded four million residents. The initial protests against NRC were organised by the Matua (Namashudra) community in West Bengal. On 1 August 2018, the members of the Matua community protested across the state, in places such as Dumdum, Sodepur, Titagarh, Palta, Halisahar, New Barrackpore, Madhyamgram, Barasat, Thakurnagar and Bhaybla in North 24 Parganas district and Chakdah, Bagula, Badkulla in Nadia district. They blocked the national highway-6 connecting Kolkata and Mumbai at Chandrapur in Howrah district. Sarva Bharatiya Namashudra Vikash Parishad promised to continue protests against NRC. They also blocked Railway traffic in various places in Bengal. Matua Mahasangha contended that NRC Assam would exclude millions of Matuas. The rail blockade by Matuas disrupted rail traffic in Sealdah division.

== No NRC movement in West Bengal ==
No NRC movement was widespread in West Bengal. The Movement was consolidated by Trinamool Congress. Due to the success of the movement, BJP was forced to disown and distance from All India NRC. Importantly, Amit Shah did not refer to NRC in his visit to Kolkata on 1 March, denoting its success.

=== Anti-NRC Protests by Trinamool Congress ===
TMC was the first mainstream political party to openly condemn the publication of NRC Assam Final Draft List and the exclusion of four million Bengalis from the list. Responding to the Draft, TMC supremo Mamata Banerjee argued that NRC Assam was a 'game plan' to 'Divide and Rule' Indians. She slammed the Assam government and the center for dividing India. She faced severe criticism from BJP and other parties for critical stand against NRC Assam. Mamata added that NRC would make Indians refugees in their own country; "They are turning Indian people into refugees in their own country".

On 12 September 2019, Mamata Banerjee led a protest rally in Kolkata against NRC. In the rally, she declared that "You can silence Assam but not Bengal".

No NRC Movement in Kolkata (West Bengal)

With the declaration of Amit Shah on 19 November 2019 in Rajya Sabha of Indian Parliament that the NRC would be implemented throughout the country, it led to the political unrest in the country. With rallies of pro NRC and anti NRC movements in different states of India culminating their viewpoints, India has seen a bunch of political scenario over the last few months. Like Bihar and Kerala, in Kolkata also several anti NRC rallies were held over the last 3 months with chief minister Mamata Banerjee playing a vanguard role in those protests.

On 26 December 2019, Chief Minister Mamata Banerjee led a massive rally against NRC and CAA from Kolkata's Raja Bazar to Mullick Bazar.On that protest attacking the Modi government she said, "I don't know my mother's birth date, birth place, how will you know".

Park Circus ground became the major venue for anti CAA protests in Kolkata where various personalities, politicians and social activists joined the protest. E.g.:P P.chidamabaram joins the anti CAA protests in Kolkata on 18 January 2020. Singer Kabir Suman, social activist Umar Khalid and Yogendra Yadav also visited the venue to express their support to the protestors.

Women also actively participated in the anti NRC and anti CAA protest in Kolkata and staged a sit in protest in the park circus maidan on 8 January. One of the protestors said, "I want to ask Prime Minister Narendra Modi and his ministers what documents they have which prove them Indians."

The anti NRC movement in Kolkata was characterised by placards, posters and slogans targeting the BJP and the centre. People have also left behind dozens of pair of shoes, scarves and dupattas in the park circus ground as a protest against NRC AND CAA.

There were also impressions of the hands of the protestors on a large canvas to protect against CAA, NRC and NPR.

Many protestors have taken the protest to a "do or die battle".For instance, one of the protestors Nauseen Baba Khan, a young research scholar, speaking to PTI at the dharna site said "its a do or die battle .We will peacefully squat here until there is a judgement in our favour"

Many protestors have talked about "sabka sath sabka vikas" and how BJP is now trying to transform its actual citizen into a second class citizen in the name of CAA.Various students from different universities like Aliah University, Calcutta University, Presidency University, Jadhavpur University and Surendranath college have also extended support to the protests in Kolkata against NRC and CAA

There was a large gathering of students outside Victoria Memorial, Kolkata protesting against BJP MP Swapan Dasgupta who came there to attend a literary meet.

The students raised slogans that "a fascist like Swapan Dasgupta shouldnot be invited to such festivals"

Swapan DasGupta faced similar protests on 8 January by the left wing students at the Visva Bharati University where he went to deliver a lecture on CAA.

=== Resolutions ===
West Bengal was the first state to pass resolution against NRC on 7 September 2019. The resolution by the TMC government was supported by Congress and CPIM but was boycotted by BJP.

== No NRC movement in Bihar ==
There were widespread protests in Bihar against NRC, led by Tejashwi Yadav (leader of opposition of Bihar) and also faced resistance from the left parties, where Kanhaiya Kumar played a key role. RJD workers protested across Bihar and blocked roads during the Bihar Bandh whereas left parties joined hand-in-hand with opposition parties to protest against the NRC. Kanhaiya Kumar on the other hand continued to conduct rallies against NRC and asked people to join him.

=== Anti- NRC Protest by RJD ===
As soon as it was declared that NRC will be implemented nationwide by Amit Shah, RJD leader Tejashwi Yadav came into action, he announced that his party will oppose CAB as well as the National Register for Citizens (NRC) in the state and across the country, not only this he also criticized CM Nitish Kumar by mentioning one of his lecture in support of NRC and also criticized central government for its steps. This was followed by supports from other parties of The Grand Alliance, Unanimously they released a statement opposing NRC in the state.

Soon Anti-NRC movement saw massive supports from the people and was criticized by many. The opposition saw it as an opportunity to bang on the ruling party and announce Bihar Bandh. Bihar Bandh witness success in many parts of Bihar, with people coming on road, closing up of markets, shut down of transports, blocking trains. The Bandh was also violent in many parts resulting in the destruction of public properties, burning fires and damaging shops.

The Bihar Bandh was successful in creating pressure on the government and saw a massive support from people across the state.

=== Anti-NRC Protest by Left Parties ===
Under the leadership of Kanhaiya Kumar, the left has find its foot in Bihar. The Left stand stood against the NRC. The left leader Kanhaiya Kumar kept on striking the government against NRC, he conducted rallies against NRC and visited various villages to speak about NRC. He was critical on NRC and discussed how it will harm the poors. He and his party focused on conducting rallies rather than going on strikes. This was due to two motives; Firstly to stand against the government and Secondly to provide root to communist party in Bihar with mass support under the leadership of Kanhaiya Kumar. This was the first time when left was seen in action in Bihar with such a support.

=== No NRC Resolution in Legislative Assembly ===
Speaker Vijay Kumar Chaudhary read out the resolution in the presence of Chief Minister Nitish Kumar, his deputy Sushil Kumar Modi and opposition leaders among others to which all the members approved by thumping of desks.

Nitish Kumar's government has passed a unanimous resolution in the Assembly stating that there's no need for NRC in Bihar. On 25 February 2020 Bihar's Legislative Assembly passed a resolution against the NRC and that the National Population Register (NPR) should be implemented "in its 2010 form" with one amendment. The resolution says there's no need to conduct an exercise to build the National Register of Citizens in Bihar. Moreover, the state will mostly use the 2010 format for compiling the National Population Register. This means the new columns added to the form for collecting NPR data, which are anyway optional won't be considered, except the column for transgender persons. Significantly, tabling the resolution, Chief Minister Nitish Kumar defended his endorsement of the Citizenship Amendment Act, which is regarded by its critics as being entwined with the NRC. Nitish Kumar got the BJP to agree with the resolution against the need for the NRC in Bihar and make it a unanimous decision despite murmurs by some state BJP leaders against their party's adjustment to Nitish Kumar's demand for unanimous resolution, the party seems to have decided to take a back step when faced with the contentious issues affecting its alliance with the JDU. The opposition Grand Alliance, led by the Rashtriya Janata Dal, is witnessing a race among its constituents to take credit for forcing the Nitish government to pass the resolution. RJD leader Tejshasvi Yadav had brought an adjournment motion and demanded a debate on the CAA, NRC and NPR in the Assembly. Nitish Kumar appealed the opposition to exercise restraint on CAA as it is a central act passed by Parliament which is currently pending with the Supreme Court and also said that several top leaders of the Congress, as well as Lalu Prasad had spoken in favour of a law for granting citizenship to refugees which the CAA was all about. In many ways, Nitish Kumar's prompt response of endorsing the CAA but passing a resolution rejecting the need for the NRC has act as a dilemma for both his opponents and his ally, the BJP. The all-party resolution got the approval of the legislative assembly in the post-lunch session following a debate on the adjournment motion moved by leader of the opposition Tejashwi Yadav and others in the House.

Bihar chief minister, Nitish Kumar On Dec, 2019 asserted that NRC will not be implemented in the state, putting at rest JDUs support to CAA.

" "Kaahe ka NRC? Bilkul laagu nahin hoga" (NRC, what for? Will not at all be implemented), Kumar quipped as he sauntered towards his vehicle waving at the media persons who had been waiting outside an auditorium here seeking to know the stand of the chief minister who was at the venue to address the 80th annual session of Indian Road Congress." With this, Nitish Kumar became the first chief minister from the NDA camp to have voiced disapproval of NRC. He heads a coalition government with the BJP in Bihar.

=== The possible effects of NRC on the people of Bihar ===
The people residing in Bihar will be effected a lot because of NRC.

Firstly, Bihar has 70% of its population below poverty line and 37% of its population are illiterates. These people struggle for the basic needs. It is not possible for them to have all the necessary documents.

Secondly, the majority of the internal migrant workforce are from Bihar. They though are spread all over India yet maximum go to Delhi and West Bengal.Identity documentation that is authenticated by the state is indispensable for ensuring that a person has a secure citizenship status and can benefit from the rights and protections that the state provides. For example, in India, many citizens are born at home or in rural or remote areas, not in places such as hospitals or clinics where birth certificates are issued. Bihar, the home state of many labor migrants, have birth registration rates of 6.5 percent. This means that many labor migrants are undocumented when they arrive in the receiving community.Many do not know the correct procedure for obtaining documents. Overall, their migrant status makes it difficult for them to have certain documents and hence NRC if implemented will effect these migrant labours a lot.

Thirdly, Bihar shares it borders with Nepal. Some Nepalis have settled in eastern India better than many Indians but many of the Nepalis do not yet have land deeds and it will be even more difficult for them to get the rights if the NRC is implemented.The 1950 Nepal-India treaty gave Nepali and Indian citizens the right to freely come and go in each other's countries, although India requires visas from Bangladeshis and Pakistanis. The issue of the identity of Indians of Nepali origin has fuelled an agitation for autonomy in the Darjeeling hills for many years. Subhas Ghising proposed that they be called ‘Gorkha’ to differentiate them from Nepali citizens. But this is not legally, or widely, accepted. There are no Nepali refugees in India. During the election campaign, Home Minister Shah assured people that the NRC would not affect 'Gorkhas'. But they are still confused regarding citizenship bill and register. Nepalis are in dilemma now on how to get Indian citizenship if NRC is implemented.
Also, NRC will not only affect the poor Muslims without proper documentation but it will also be harsh on the poor non- Muslims without proper documentation. And CAA will not be useful for saving these non-Muslims as CAA is meant to provide citizenship to persecuted minorities of Islamic or Muslim majority neighbour countries- Pakistan, Afghanistan, Bangladesh but the Indian state of Bihar shares its international border with Nepal and most of the non-Muslims affected by the NRC in Bihar will not be able to prove their migration from these 3 countries. Hence, CAA won't prove instrumental in securing their citizenship.

== No NRC movement in Kerala ==
Kerala saw massive protests against CAA-NPR-NRC, including a statewide human chain, with the participation of around 6-7 million people.

== NRIC ==
BJP threatened to conduct National Register of Indian Citizens, i.e., NRC across India on various occasions. Amit Shah was at the forefront of campaigning for an all India NRC.

=== Resistance against NRIC ===
- AIMIM president Asaduddin Owaisi opposed NRC as it would create hardships for people, especially Minorities in India; he stated that "Modi wants all Indians to yet again stand in line, detaining undocumented Indians & leaving minorities & the weak at the mercy of babus. Nowhere in the world are people put through such hardship".
- Kanthapuram A. P. Aboobacker Musliyar opposed the Citizenship Amendment Bill and Citizenship Amendment Act, and he organised and attended in many protests against the act. He has not supported the hartal was organised by SDPI and said the hartal is needless. He visited the family members of protesters killed in police firing at Mangalore to expressed his condolences.
- On 25 December 2019, while speaking at Delhi University, Arundhati Roy urged people to mislead authorities during the upcoming enumeration by the National Population Register, which she said can serve as a database for the National Register of Citizens. The remarks were criticized across the political divide. Complaint against her was registered under sections 295A, 504, 153 and 120B of Indian Penal Code at Tilak Marg police station, Delhi. Later, she claimed that her comments were misinterpreted.

== See also ==
- Citizenship (Amendment) Act, 2019
- Citizenship Amendment Act protests
- National Register of Citizens
