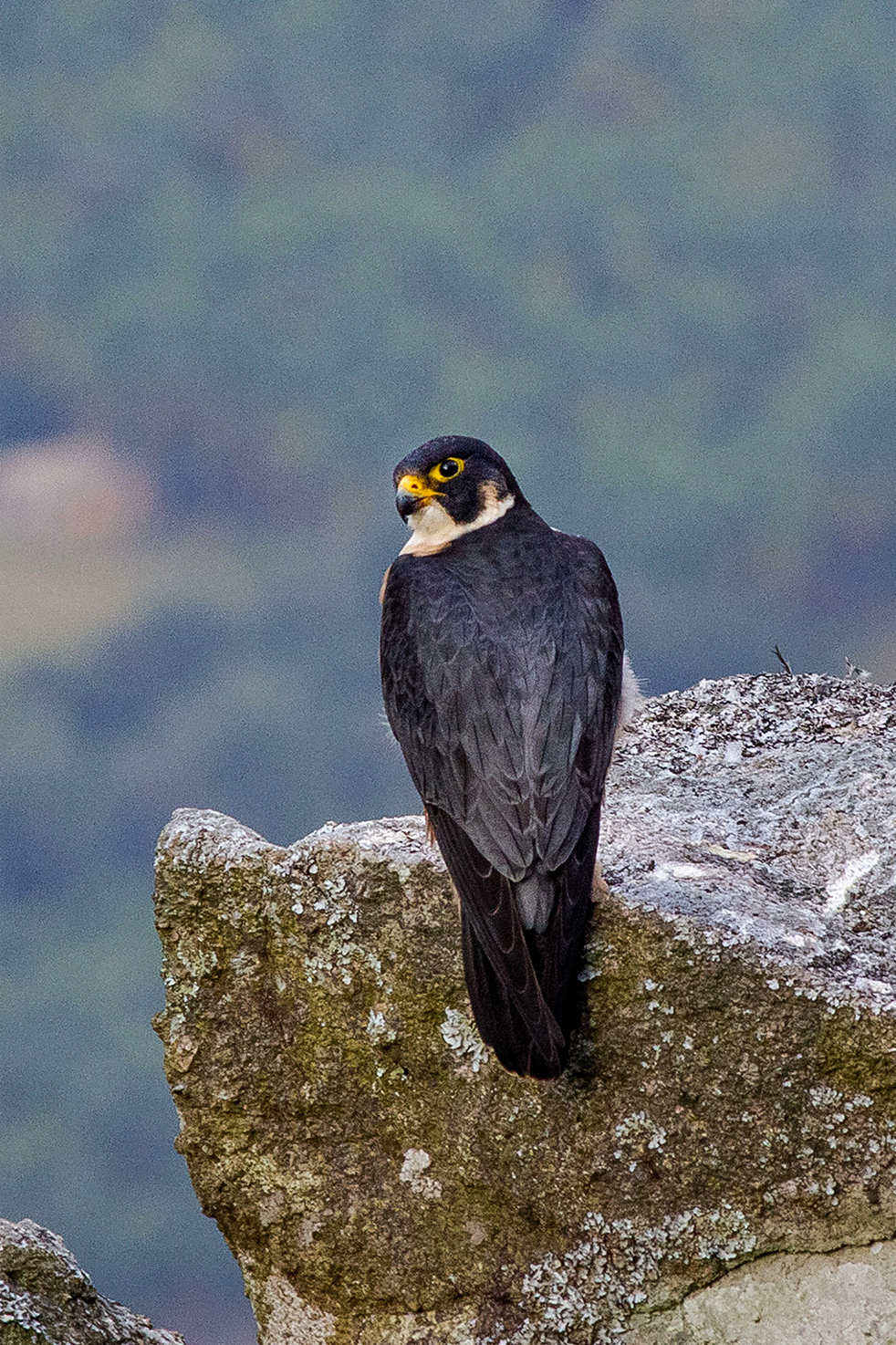
- Shaheen falcon in Ramakkalmedu, Kerala, India.

Scientific classification
- Kingdom: Animalia
- Phylum: Chordata
- Class: Aves
- Order: Falconiformes
- Family: Falconidae
- Genus: Falco
- Species: F. peregrinus
- Subspecies: F. p. peregrinator

Trinomial name
- Falco peregrinus peregrinator Sundevall, 1837
- Distribution limits based on Döttlinger (2002)

Synonyms
- Falco atriceps; Falco shaheen

= Shaheen falcon =

Shaheen Falcon

Subspecies of bird

The shaheen falcon (Falco peregrinus peregrinator), also known as black shaheen and Indian peregrine falcon, is a non-migratory subspecies of the peregrine falcon found mainly in the Indian subcontinent. It has also been described as a migratory subspecies. The word shaheen in these names may also be spelled as shahin. This species was termed as the black shaheen by falconers to separate it from the true shaheen of Persian literature (the Barbary falcon).

== Etymology ==
Shaheen and other variations come from Middle Persian šāhēn (literally "majestic, kingly") and the given name Šāhēn. Compare Middle Armenian շահէն (šahēn) and Old Armenian Շահէն (Šahēn). It has two meanings in Persian/Farsi: falcon, especially the Barbary falcon; the second meaning being a pointer of a scale. Scholars of Persian and the Russian ornithologist Georgi Petrovich Dementiev have noted that the name shaheen in Persian literature actually referred to Falco peregrinus babylonicus.

== Taxonomy ==
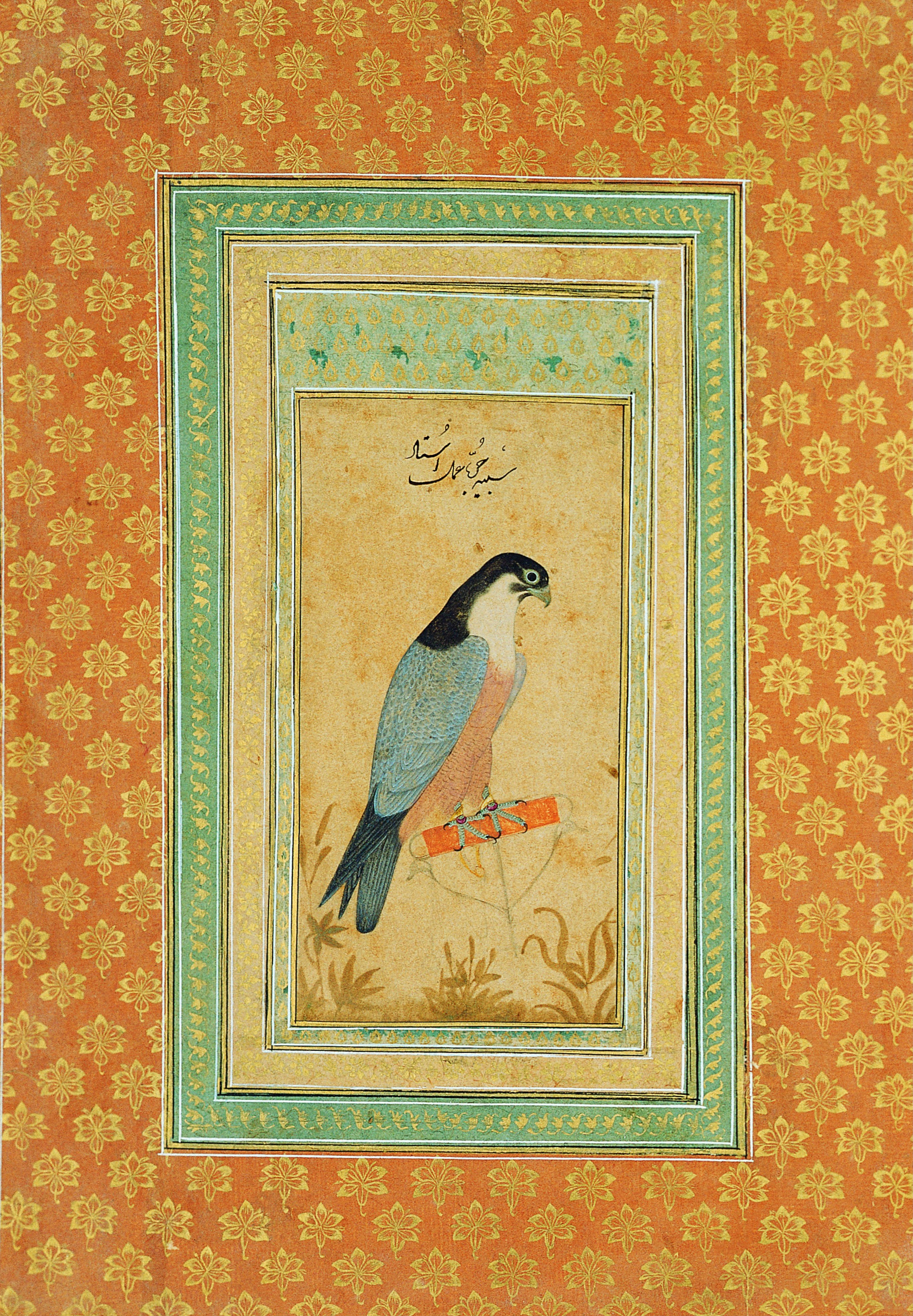
Shaheen falcon, miniature by Mansur. Mughal India, early 17th-century. Chhatrapati Shivaji Maharaj Vastu Sangrahalaya

The taxon was formally described by Carl Jakob Sundevall in 1837 as a separate species Falco peregrinator, based on a juvenile specimen caught on a ship between Sri Lanka and the Nicobar Islands. Its taxonomic status as a subspecies of Falco peregrinus has been controversial for several years. Amidst conflicting views by ornithologists in the mid-19th century, the shaheen falcon was described as three new species: Falco shaheen from south India was described by Jerdon in 1839, Falco micrurus from Nepal and Burma was described by Hodgson in 1844, and Falco atriceps from Northern India was described by Hume in 1869. These three species were generally accepted as distinct until around the turn of the century, when all three were lumped together with Sundevall's Falco peregrinator as Falco peregrinus peregrinator.

The subspecies name peregrinator, Latin for a wanderer or habitual traveler, was selected by Sundevall for its similarity to the species name peregrinus of the peregrine falcon, because Sundevall recognised the close similarity of his new bird to that.

The common English name shahin should not be confused with the same word in the Indo-European language, Persian, the Turkic language Turkish, and the Afroasiatic language Arabic, where it may refer to falcons or a species of falcon. In the Indo-European language Hindi, shahin or shahin kohi (koh refers to a hill) refer to females of F. p. peregrinator, while males of the subspecies are referred to as kohila.

== Description ==
The shaheen is a small and powerful-looking falcon with blackish upperparts, rufous underparts with fine, dark streaks, and white on the throat. The complete black face mask is sharply demarcated from the white throat. It has distinctive rufous underwing-coverts. It differs in all these features from the paler F. p. calidus, which is a winter visitor to India, Sri Lanka, and elsewhere in southern Asia. Males and females have similar markings and plumage; apart from size there is no sexual dimorphism. The birds range in length from 38 to 44 cm. The male is about the size of a house crow (Corvus splendens); the female is larger.

== Distribution and habitat ==
The shaheen is found in south and southeast Asia, from Pakistan in the west, throughout India, Bangladesh, Sri Lanka, central and south-eastern China, and northern Myanmar. In India, it has been recorded in all states mainly from rocky and hilly regions. The shaheen has also been reported from the Andaman and Nicobar Islands in the Bay of Bengal.

=== Sri Lanka ===
The shaheen is the local resident species of the peregrine in Sri Lanka where it is uncommon but found throughout the island in the lowlands, and at elevations of up to 1200 m in the hill country, frequenting mountain cliffs and rock outcrops. The sheer cliff faces provide it with nest sites and serve as vantage points from which it can launch aerial strikes against fast-flying birds such as swifts. Sigiriya is a well known site for it.

== Ecology and behaviour ==
The shaheen is usually seen as a solitary bird, or in pairs on cliffs and rock pinnacles. Peregrines typically mate for life. Because of the size difference between a male and a female, a mated pair generally hunt different prey species. It is adapted to taking prey in the air and can achieve a speed of 240 kmh in level flight; when diving after prey it can exceed speeds of 320 kmh (200 mph).

=== Feeding ===
Shaheens mostly hunt small birds, though medium-sized birds such as pigeons and parrots are also taken. Strong and fast, they dive from great heights to strike prey with their talons. If the impact does not kill the prey, the falcon bites the neck of its victim to ensure a kill.

=== Breeding ===
The reproductive season is from December to April. The birds occupy nests on high cliff ledges or in cavities and tunnels. They lay clutches of 3-4 eggs. The chicks fledge within 48 days with an average nesting success of 1.32 chicks per nest. In India the shaheen has been recorded as nesting on man-made structures such as buildings and mobile phone transmission towers.

== Status ==
The conservation status of the shaheen in Sri Lanka is vulnerable. A preliminary population estimate of 40 breeding pairs there was made in 1996, based on a brief survey. The estimate was later corrected to 100 breeding pairs.

== In culture ==
In Pakistani literature, the shaheen has a special association with the poetry of the country's national poet, Allama Iqbal. It is regarded as the state bird of Pakistan, and appears on the official seal of the Pakistan Air Force logo. It is also used as a nickname for the Pakistani cricket team, and the Pakistan national football team.

A misprinted 1992 Indian stamp in a "birds of prey" series showed a picture of an osprey, with the incorrect denomination and the name Shahin Kohila, the Hindi name for female shaheen falcons; one of these stamps sold for £11,500 in a 2011 London auction.
