= Asif Iqbal Tanha =

Indian student activist

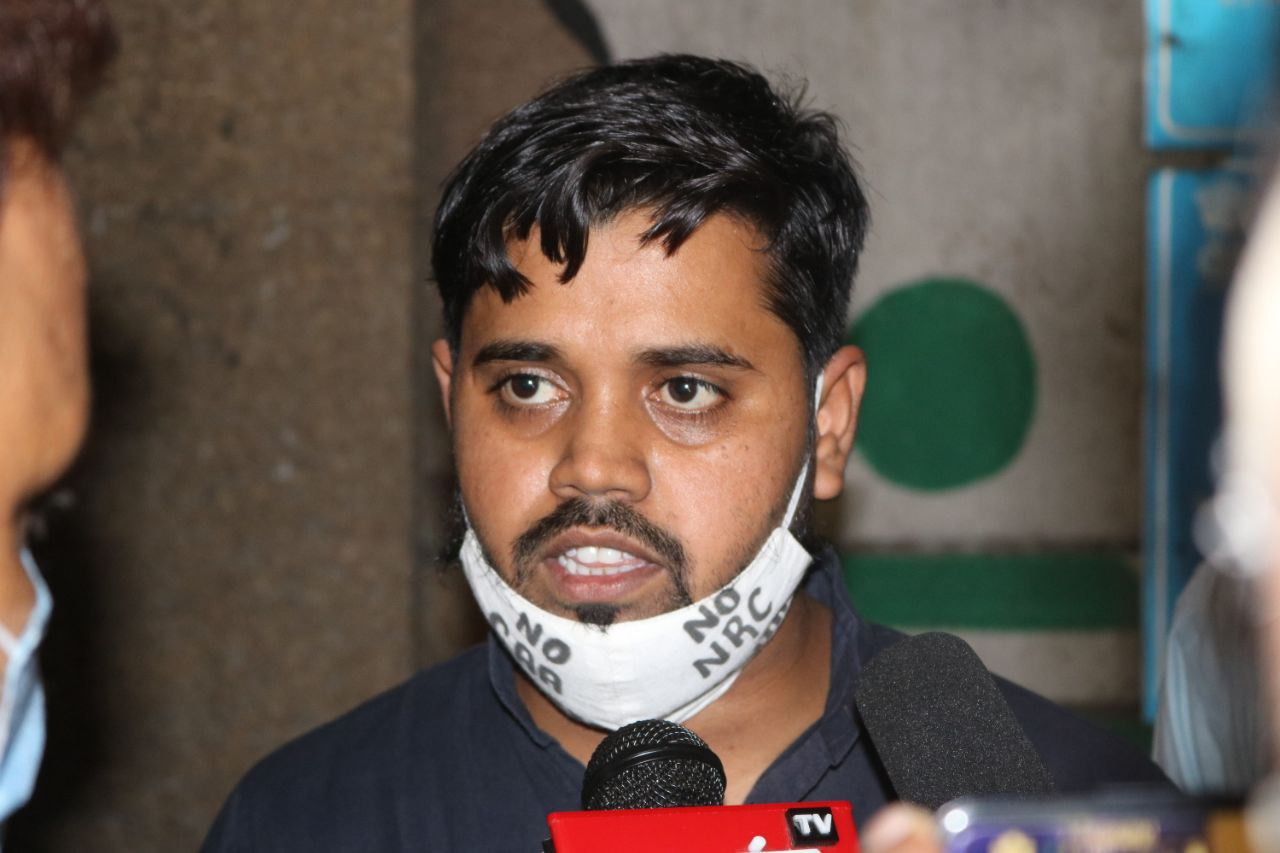
- Born: 13 January 1996 (age 30); Hazaribagh, Jharkhand
- Education: Jamia Milia Islamia
- Known for: being arrested as a result of taking part in the Citizenship Amendment Act protests
- Spouse: Nikhat Momin (m. 2023)

Asif Iqbal Tanha (born 13 January 1996) is an Indian student activist, a former student of Jamia Millia Islamia and a member of Students Islamic Organisation of India. He was allegedly involved in the Delhi Riots conspiracy case and is an accused under the UAPA Act. Tanha is also associated with United Against Hate (UAH), a campaign that was started in July 2017 in response to the series of lynchings and hate crimes in India.

== Early life and education ==
Asif Iqbal Tanha was born on 13 January 1996 in Hazaribagh, Jharkhand. He received his primary education in his hometown and graduated in the traditional dars-e-nizami from Jamia Misbahul Uloom, an Islamic seminary in Uttar Pradesh. He received a B.A. in Persian language from the Jamia Millia Islamia.

== Personal life ==
On 7 May 2023, Tanha married Nikhat Momin.

== Political activism and controversies ==
=== Jamia violence and arrest ===
After Indian Parliament passed the controversial Citizenship Amendment Act, students started protesting in and outside their universities including Jamia Millia Islamia, Aligarh Muslim University and Jawaharlal Nehru University. Asif along with other activists such as Meeran Haider, Safoora Zargar were leading the protests. He was representing students Islamic Organisation in Jamia Coordination Committee formed after Jamia Violence. On 15 December 2019 when Delhi Police entered in the campus forcefully to suppress the protesting students. Next day Delhi police registered an FIR against Asif and some other student activists. Delhi Police arrested Asif on 17 May 2020 during lockdown.

=== Case status ===
He got the bail in the Delhi Riots Conspiracy case on 16 June 2021. Police did not file the charge sheet in the Jamia Violence case yet. In his press meet after release from Jail, Tanha said he will continue the struggle against the CAA.

=== Media trial ===
On 18 August 2020, Zee News claimed that they got Tanha's confession. In Zee News’s Special Show DNA, Sudheer Chowdhary claimed that Tanha has accepted his role in Jamia and Delhi Violence. Tanha’s counsel filed a legal case against Zee News, OpIndia and other 2 parties. Where Asif Iqbal Tanha stated before the Delhi High Court that Zee News and OpIndia violated Programme Code by making public the alleged confessional statement. Delhi High Court on 15 October 2020 issued notice to Zee News channel to file an affidavit to disclose the source from where the alleged confessional statement was received.

== See also ==
- Meeran Haider
- Safoora Zargar
- Nadeem Khan (social activist)
- Sharjeel Imam
- Umar Khalid
