= Safoora Zargar =

Indian student activist

- Born: 1993 (age 32–33); Kishtwar, Jammu & Kashmir, India
- Education: B.A, Jesus and Mary College, Delhi University; MA, M.Phil, JMI
- Known for: being arrested as a result of taking part in the Citizenship Amendment Act protests
- Spouse: Saboor Ahmed Sirwal (m. 2018)

Safoora Zargar (born 1993) is an Indian student activist leader from Kishtwar, Jammu and Kashmir, best known for her role in the Citizenship Amendment Act protests.

Zargar was a M. Phil student of Jamia Millia Islamia and media coordinator of the Jamia Coordination Committee. She was in custody from 10 April until 24 June 2020, accused of being part of a conspiracy to cause riots and of making an inflammatory speech on 23 February 2020. Delhi Police said that Zargar was involved in a "sinister design" with the "objective of uprooting a democratically elected government." The Delhi High Court granted Zargar bail at the fourth application on 23 June 2020, and she was released late on 24 June 2020.

== Early life and education ==
Zargar was born in 1993 in Kishtwar, in the Chenab Valley of the erstwhile Indian state of Jammu and Kashmir into a Kashmiri Muslim family. Her father was a government employee. She moved to Delhi in 1998 with her family, when her father was posted in neighboring Faridabad, Haryana, part of National Capital Region (NCR). When she was five, at school in Delhi, she was the only Muslim in her class. According to Zargar in 2018, the attitude that some people had towards her when she was at school in Delhi at the age of five was: "You are a terrorist, go back to Pakistan".

She graduated with a B.A. from Jesus and Mary College, Delhi University, she did an M.A. in sociology at Jamia Millia Islamia (New Delhi), and in 2019 started an M.Phil in sociology with special focus on urban studies at Jamia Millia Islamia. In September 2022, the university cancelled her admission and banned her entry to the campus stating her involvement in "organizing agitations, protests and marches on the campus against the irrelevant and objectionable issues to disturb the peaceful academic environment" and "instigating innocent students of the University and trying to use the University platform for her malafide political agenda along with some other students."

As of 2020, her father is retired, her mother a home-maker, and she has a sister.

== Political activism ==
Zargar was a member of the media wing of the Jamia Coordination Committee (JCC). According to Delhi Police, she was one of the founders of the JCC, and "was the admin of JCC's WhatsApp group". In 2020, she joined anti-CAA protests in Delhi. On 10 February 2020 she fainted when she was "caught in a scuffle between the police and students" and was taken to hospital.

=== Arrest and bail hearings ===
She was initially arrested at her residence by Delhi Police on 10 April 2020, with police claiming she was among those who organised an anti-CAA protest and road blockade under the Jaffrabad metro station in Delhi on 22–23 February. (Note: On 22–23 February 2020, about 500 people (mostly women) protested at Jaffrabad metro station against the Citizenship Amendment Act and the National Register of Citizens. The protesters blocked road No. 66 under the station. Delhi Metro Rail Corporation closed the station, and trains were ordered not to halt there. Many police were present (including policewomen).) On 11 April she was brought before the Metropolitan Magistrate and remanded in police custody for two days. On 13 April she was granted bail, but immediately rearrested by the police on another charge. Additional charges were brought against her on 20 or 21 April.

Delhi police have said that the violence was a pre-meditated conspiracy and all arrests have been made based on scientific and forensic evidence. Zargar is also charged under the Unlawful Activities (Prevention) Act (UAPA).

Since 15 April 2020, she has been held in Tihar Jail. This is an overcrowded prison, and to protect her and her unborn baby from COVID-19, she was held in solitary confinement for almost two weeks. Officials of Tihar jail said that she was kept isolated in a single cell, and denied that that constituted solitary confinement because she had been allowed to talk to her family on the telephone at least once. According to a report of The Hindu, "A high-powered committee headed by a Delhi High Court judge directed DG (Prisons) to ensure that adequate medical assistance is provided to Zargar". The report also states that she was arrested in connection with North East Delhi riots.

On 18 April 2020, Zargar's lawyers applied for bail, but this was rejected by the court on 21 April. They made another bail application on 2 May, but withdrew it in court.

On 26 May 2020, a Delhi court remanded Zargar in custody until 25 June.

On 30 May 2020, Zargar's lawyers again applied for bail, and this was rejected on 4 June by Delhi's Patiala House Court. According to the prosecution, Zargar made an inflammatory speech on 23 February 2020 at Chand Bagh (part of Delhi). Judge Dharmender Rana said, "The acts and inflammatory speeches of the co-conspirators are admissible under Section 10 of the Indian Evidence even against the applicant/accused." According to Zargar's lawyers (Ritesh Dhar Dubey and Trideep Pais), though Zargar had briefly visited Chand Bagh on 23 February before the violence started, Zargar delivered her speech that day in Khureji (another part of Delhi). They denied that the speech was inflammatory or provocative. The judge referred to eyewitness statements and a record of a WhatsApp chat, and said "there is prima facie evidence to show that there was a conspiracy to at least block the roads (chakka jam)." (Note: Chakka Jam is a term used in India and Nepal for the "deliberate creation of traffic jams as a form of political and social protest".)

"Noted constitutional scholars, including Gautam Bhatia, have critiqued the reasoning in that order [of 4 June 2020] for Ms. Zargar’s continued detention." (Note: Professor Kalpana Kannabiran has also criticised the "incarceration of student activist Safoora Zargar and the obduracy of courts in refusing her bail".) In June 2020, a preliminary report by the American Bar Association said that "International law, including treaties to which India is a state party, only permit pre-trial detention under narrow circumstances, which do not appear to have been met in Zargar's case." The report also said that "In addition to her legal issues, Zargar has also been the victim of a slanderous online campaign, including falsified and explicit images of her being shared online and through WhatsApp messenger". "Many student groups across Delhi have held protests seeking Zargar’s release", saying that the police had launched "a witch hunt against student activists".

On 17 June 2020, Zargar applied to the Delhi High Court, challenging the 4 June order and seeking bail. The application was heard on 18 June 2020 by Justice Rajiv Shakdher, who issued a notice to the police asking them to file a status report on the bail plea. At the hearing on 22 June, the police status report said that Zargar was one of the "main conspirators and the instigator" of riots in northeast Delhi, and was involved in a "web of actions animated by unlawful object of creating terror and disaffection". The police said that Zargar's "protestations of innocence are phony; her actions are neither licit nor legitimate and she is clearly culpable of criminal wrongs of grave magnitude deserving no indulgence from the court".

Part of Zargar's grounds for seeking bail was her pregnancy. However, Indian law makes no distinction on grounds of pregnancy. Delhi Police told the high court on 22 June 2020, that many people in prison in Delhi are pregnant, and that 39 births have taken place inside prison in Delhi during the last ten years. According to the police status report, in prison Zargar had her own separate cell, a good diet, and medical attention. "In fact, more care and caution are being practised in jail so far as social distancing norms are concerned that would be available to her outside the jail premises".

On 23 June 2020, Delhi High Court granted bail for Safoora Zargar. The court told her not to get involved in any activity which may hamper the investigation, and not to leave Delhi without permission. "She has been asked to pay a personal bond of 10,000 rupees ($132; £106) before her release." This was the fourth bail application, which ended after a three days hearing. Tushar Mehta (the Solicitor General of India), represented the police at the hearings on 22 and 23 June. On 22 June, the police opposed bail, but then Mehta asked for the hearing to be adjourned until 23 June to enable him to receive further instructions. On 23 June Mehta told the court that the police agreed to Zargar's bail on humanitarian grounds. Zargar was released from Tihar Jail late on 24 June 2020. After her release, Zargar told a journalist from PTI, "I am grateful to the almighty and all those who have spoken out for me within India and outside and deeply grateful to the Delhi High Court for this order of release". She also said: "I am immensely grateful to my family for standing by me and for going through this trauma and worry. I need time and space to get my health and life in order and I do not wish to say anything else at this point of time. I am grateful to my lawyer".

The Deccan Chronicle expressed the opinion that Zargar's release on bail had been a surprise, and noted that Jamia Millia Islamia students Meeran Haider, Shifa-ur-Rehman and Asif Iqbal Tanha, and Jawaharlal Nehru University (JNU) student Natasha Narwal and former-JNU-student Umar Khalid have not so far been bailed.

A special cell of the Delhi Police say that there was a conspiracy to orchestrate riots just before the visit to India of the United States President Donald Trump on 24–25 February 2020. The police have registered a first information report (FIR) to prove the conspiracy. On 17 June 2020, a Delhi court gave the police two months to file the charge sheet. On 13 August 2020, the court gave the police until 17 September to file the charge sheet. Safoora Zargar is one of the ten people named by the police as the main accused in the case. Other people named in the FIR were: (1) Gulfisha Fatima, (2) Meeran Haider, (3) Tahir Hussain, (4) Ishrat Jahan, (5) Devangana Kalita, (6) Natasha Narwal, (7) Shafa ur Rehman, (8) Khalid Saifi, and (9) Asif Iqbal Tanha who have been arrested. The FIR also named Umar Khalid.

On 25 November 2020, Delhi High Court granted her permission to stay at her maternal home in Haryana for two months, on condition that she put a pin on Google maps, to help the investigating officer to verify where she was. There were other conditions: she needed to contact the investigating officer by telephone every 15 days, and she would need the permission of the trial court if she needed to travel.

The Working Group on Arbitrary Detention (UNWGAD) criticised the Indian government for violating Universal Declaration of Human Rights and other international laws with regard to detention of Zargar.

== Online vilification ==
After the arrest of Safoora Zargar, several people on social media started sharing unrelated images and screen captures from videos falsely claimed to be Zargar. People shared an image from a porn video claiming that it was Zargar, but the fact checking website Alt News, revealed that all the allegations made were fake and baseless. That video was taken from Pornhub and the woman in the video was Pornhub model Selena Banks.

Other social media posts targeting Safoora Zargar for her marital status and pregnancy occurred, with large numbers of individuals claiming that she was unmarried and that her pregnancy was discovered when she was lodged in Tihar Jail. The Quint fact checked all the allegations, which were revealed to be fake. It has been suggested that the online campaigns against her were misogyny and Islamophobia. Delhi Police hadn't taken any action against the online vilification campaigns and trolls as of 20 May 2020.

== Personal life ==
Zargar was interviewed in May 2018. She was described as lacking a typical Kashmiri accent due to being raised mostly in Delhi. She was comfortable speaking Hindi. She said that she usually did not reveal that she was Kashmiri because "People tend to judge me or look at me differently the moment I talk about my Kashmiri identity."

On 6 October 2018 in an arranged marriage, Safoora Zargar wed Saboor Ahmed Sirwal in Kishtwar. (Note: According to the Huffington Post, Zargar's marriage was in September 2018.) On 12 October 2020, Zargar gave birth to a child.

== See also ==
- Ishrath Jahan
- Gulfisha Fatima
- Nadeem Khan (social activist)
- Meeran Haider
- Shailendra Pandya
