= Sharjeel Imam =

Indian student activist (born 1988)

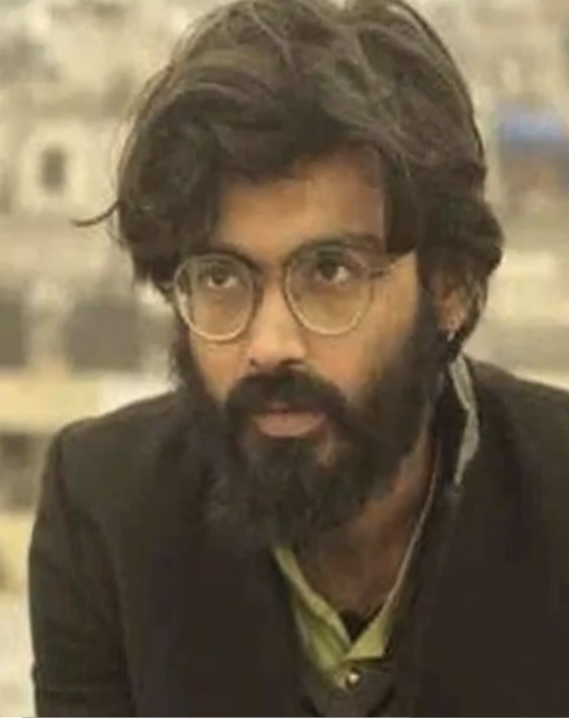
- Imam in 2020
- Born: 1988 (age 37–38); Kako, Bihar, India
- Education: IIT Bombay; JNU

Sharjeel Imam (born 1988) is an activist in India. He participated in the Citizenship Amendment Act protests, against the Citizenship Amendment Act, 2019 (CAA) and the National Register of Citizens (NRC). He was later arrested by the Delhi Police under sedition laws for "inflammatory" speeches, which called for the permanent cutting-off of the state of Assam, which allegedly incited the 2020 Delhi riots. His incarceration has drawn condemnation from international human rights groups such as Human Rights Watch, the International Federation for Human Rights, and Amnesty International. The United States Commission on International Religious Freedom (USCIRF) lists him in its victims database as being detained for his "religious freedom advocacy." According to USCIRF, Sharjeel Imam was arrested in January 2020 for taking part in "peaceful protests opposing the religious discriminatory Citizen Amendment Act (CAA) in December 2019 and January 2020."

== Early life and education ==
Sharjeel Imam was born in 1988 at Kako village of Jehanabad district, Bihar. His father Akbar Imam was a politician; his mother is a homemaker, and his brother is a social activist. Akbar Imam was a Janata Dal (United) (JDU) candidate in the Jehanabad constituency in the 2005 assembly election. In 2014, Akbar died of cancer after an illness lasting many years.

Sharjeel Imam started school in 1994 and was considered a bibliophile by his teachers. He was schooled at a missionary school in Patna, and later, Delhi Public School, Vasant Kunj. After completing high school in 2006, he studied computer engineering at the Indian Institute of Technology Bombay (IIT Bombay). After graduation, he spent two years in Bangalore, where he joined a software company. In 2013, he joined Jawaharlal Nehru University (JNU) in New Delhi to complete his master's degree in Modern History and started PhD in 2015 from the same university.

Imam in an interview said that his politics derives from his Islamic faith and described his intellectual influences as Islamic modernist thinkers such as Muhammad Iqbal and Ali Shariati.

== Career ==
Imam worked at the IT University of Copenhagen as a programmer for two months in 2009 and later worked as a teaching assistant at IIT Bombay. Thereafter, he worked as an engineer at Juniper Networks before returning to academics. Imam wrote articles for TRT World, Firstpost, The Quint, and The Wire.

== Political activism ==
Imam was active in the anti-CAA protests and is believed to have initiated the Shaheen Bagh sit-in protest. Police said that Imam made two "very inflammatory and instigatory speeches in his opposition to CAA and NRC" on 13 December 2019 and 16 January 2020. The latter speech was 40 minutes long; in a three-minute long viral video of that speech, Imam could be heard calling for Assam to be permanently "cut off" from the rest of India by blocking the Siliguri Corridor, also known as "Chicken's Neck", which Imam claimed was a call for a "chakka jam" — a sit-in protest that involves roadblock and stopping vehicular movements, also deployed at the Shaheen Bagh protest site.

Several human rights activists and legal experts have criticised the cases against Imam. Aakar Patel, former head of Amnesty International India, stated that he does not find any part of Imam's speech seditious. Citing the Brandenburg v. Ohio ruling, former Supreme Court of India justice Markandey Katju came out in defence of Sharjeel, arguing for quashing of First Information Reports (FIRs) against him, saying that "he has not committed a crime", even though he disapproves of his speech.

Imam's arrest was widely criticised by politicians, teachers, students, activists and other organizations. The Jawaharlal Nehru University Students' Union said that his arrest is a matter of "Islamophobia, selective amnesia & bias" of the state apparatus. JNU Teachers' Association alleged that the sedition charge was invoked due to "other reasons" and that it reflects "politicisation" of the conduct of law enforcement agencies. One hundred and forty-eight students and alumni of various Indian Institutes of Technology (IITs) and over a hundred students from Jamia Millia Islamia, Aligarh Muslim University (AMU) and other state universities signed a letter in his support. A group of students hailing from Bihar and studying in prominent institutions, including Jawaharlal Nehru University and IIT Delhi, wrote an open letter to Rashtriya Janata Dal (RJD) leader Tejashwi Yadav, urging him to demand the release of Imam highlighting Imam's contributions as an academic, student, historian and journalist.

Over 50 activists were booked under sedition charges by Mumbai Police for raising slogans in support of Sharjeel Imam at a Pride Solidarity gathering in February 2020.

=== Cases filed by different states ===
Five Indian states have filed various cases against Imam includes Assam, Uttar Pradesh, Manipur, Arunachal Pradesh and Delhi.

- On 25 January 2020, Assam Police registered a FIR against Imam for his alleged hate speech under section 13 (1)/18 of Unlawful Activities Prevention Act (UAPA) read with section 153A, 153B and 124A of Indian Penal Code (IPC).
- On the same day, Aligarh Police in Uttar Pradesh also registered case against Imam for sedition and creating enmity between two groups.
- Manipur police also filed an FIR against Imam for waging war against the Indian government, sedition, indulging in vilification, attacks on a particular group or conspiracy to commit offences. The police filed the FIR for his remarks to "cut off" northeast from rest of the country under FIR number 16(1)2020 IPC under sections 121/121-A/124-A/120-B/153 IPC.
- On 26 January 2020, Arunachal Pradesh's Itanagar Police filed a FIR against Imam under section 124(A), 153(A) and 153(B) of the IPC for sedition, promoting enmity between groups.
- The Delhi Police filed an FIR under IPC section 153 in addition to the charges of sedition and promoting religious enmity.

=== Prison ===
On 28 January 2020, Sharjeel Imam surrendered to Delhi Police in his native village of Kako. He was on Facebook Live before surrendering, for allegedly delivering inflammatory speeches against Citizenship Amendment Act (CAA) and National Register of Citizens (NRC). He was also booked under UAPA. After his arrest, he was taken to Assam and was held in Guwahati Central Jail. Whilst in prison, he was infected with COVID-19 and tested positive for it on 21 July 2020.

On 29 July 2020, a Delhi court issued a summon against Imam in the case related to his alleged inflammatory speech. Additional Sessions Judge Dharmender Rana, after viewing the charge-sheet filed against Imam under UAPA, asked him to appear in court on 1 September 2020. The court took this decision due to the coronavirus pandemic and said that if the physical appearance of Imam is not possible then he can be presented via video-conferencing.

In April 2022, a district court in Delhi denied bail to Imam in a case alleging a "larger conspiracy" into the 2020 Delhi riots, involving charges under UAPA and IPC, stating that the allegations were "prima facie true". In September 2020, Imam was granted bail in a case alleging that he delivered a seditious speech near Jamia Millia Islamia in 2019.

In May 2024, Imam was granted bail in the case pertaining to his speeches made during the protests against Citizenship Amendment Act by the Delhi High Court. However, he remains in jail in alleged connection with the larger conspiracy case involving Unlawful Activities Prevention Act (UAPA) charges related to the 2020 Delhi riot.

On 5 January 2026, the Supreme Court of India's two-judge bench rejected the bail plea of Imam along with Umar Khalid, while granting conditional bail to five other co-accused. The judges drew a distinction between the latter's alleged role and those ascribed to Umar Khalid and Sharjeel Imam. They held that the allegations against the five co-accused were "limited" and "ancillary" in nature, whereas Khalid and Imam faced allegations of a “larger conspiracy” behind the riots in New Delhi. They cited the gravity of the allegations and the "central and formative role" role attributed to them by the prosecution. Court further held that the prosecution material, taken at face value, including alleged digital coordination, planning and mobilisation, call detail record evidence, disclosed reasonable grounds for believing that the accusations were prima facie true under the UAPA.

On 30 September 2026, a Division Bench of the Delhi High Court dismissed Imam's bail appeals from the order Additional Session Judge, Karkardooma Courts rejecting his bail application. The Court upheld that as the Supreme Court's order Imam and Khalid could renew their bail prayers only after the examination of the protected witnesses relied upon by the prosecution or upon the expiry of one year from the Supreme Court order, whichever was earlier. The High Court rejected arguments of parity with certain co-accused who had received interim relief and of changed circumstances, observing that the Supreme Court had already distinguished the roles attributed to Imam and Khalid as alleged core conspirators and ideological drivers from those of the others.

=== Interviews and reactions ===
On 29 September 2026, The Quint published an interview with Imam, with his answers conveyed through family and friends. The published article was described as Imam's "Islamist manifesto" by critics and scholars. In it he described the "secular framework" as part of the same nationalist framework as Hindutva. He said the Constitution had denied Muslims representation and has centralisation enshrined in it. He said that India was born out of the refusal of Muslim demands, leaving Muslims who stayed in India with “token representation” and “no statutory guarantees”. A writer going by the pseudonym of Ibn khaldun Bharati on ThePrint, described Imam's views as anti-secular and anti-Constitution and criticised liberals for not responding to them.

== See also ==
- 2020 Delhi riots
- Umar Khalid
- Meeran Haider
- Safoora Zargar
