= Meeran Haider =

Indian activist leader

- Born: 1991 (age 34–35); Siwan district, Bihar
- Education: Jamia Milia Islamia
- Known for: taking part in the Citizenship Amendment Act protests
- Political party: Rashtriya Janata Dal

Meeran Haider is one of the nine accused whom Delhi High Court denied bail in Delhi Riots 2020. He claims to be an Indian activist leader and human rights defender known for his role in Citizenship Amendment Act protests. He was also the RJD State President of Delhi youth wing unit.

== Early life and education ==
Meeran Haider was born in 1991 at Barharia block of Siwan district, Bihar. As of 2020, his father is retired. His mother died in 2019. He moved to Delhi at a young age and did his schooling from Jamia Millia Islamia. He graduated in Mechanical Engineering, going on to pursue MBA in International Business and completing an M-Phil in West Asian Studies — all from Jamia. He is presently a Ph.D research scholar at the Centre for Management Studies at Jamia.

== Political activism ==
Meeran was a member of Aam Aadmi Party's youth wing, Chatra Yuva Sangharsh Samiti (CYSS). Meeran went on a hunger strike in 2017 as part of a protest demanding the restoration of a Student Union in the university. He co-founded the Jamia Students Forum (JSF), a platform for student activists of the university. In 2019, he left the CYSS and joined Rashtriya Janta Dal (RJD). He is the President of RJD Youth Wing's Delhi unit. Haider was active in the Anti-CAA protests.

== Arrest and prison ==
On 1 April 2020 Haider was arrested during the Covid-19 lockdown, while he was engaged in relief work, for allegedly conspiring to incite communal violence during the 2020 Delhi Riots. However he was brought to before the Metropolitan Magistrate and remanded in police custody for 14 days initially. He was granted bail, but later re-arrested by the police on another charge.

According to the Delhi police the violence was a pre-meditated conspiracy and all arrests have been made based on scientific and forensic evidence. Haider was booked under Unlawful Activities (Prevention) Act (UAPA) by Delhi Police. He has been kept held in Tihar Jail since then.

According to the special cell of Delhi it was a pre-meditated conspiracy which led to Delhi riots just before the visit to India of the United States President Donald Trump on 24–25 February 2020. The Police have made FIR. The court on 13 August 2020, has given the police time until 17 September to file the charge sheet.

== Bail ==
The Supreme Court of India granted bail to Meeran Haider along with Gulfisha Fatima, Shifa ur Rehman, Mohammad Saleem Khan & Shadab Ahmed on 3 January 2026.

== See also ==
- Safoora Zargar
- Gulfisha Fatima
- Sharjeel Imam
- Umar Khalid
- Nadeem Khan
