= Gurmehar Kaur =

Indian student activist and author (born 1996)

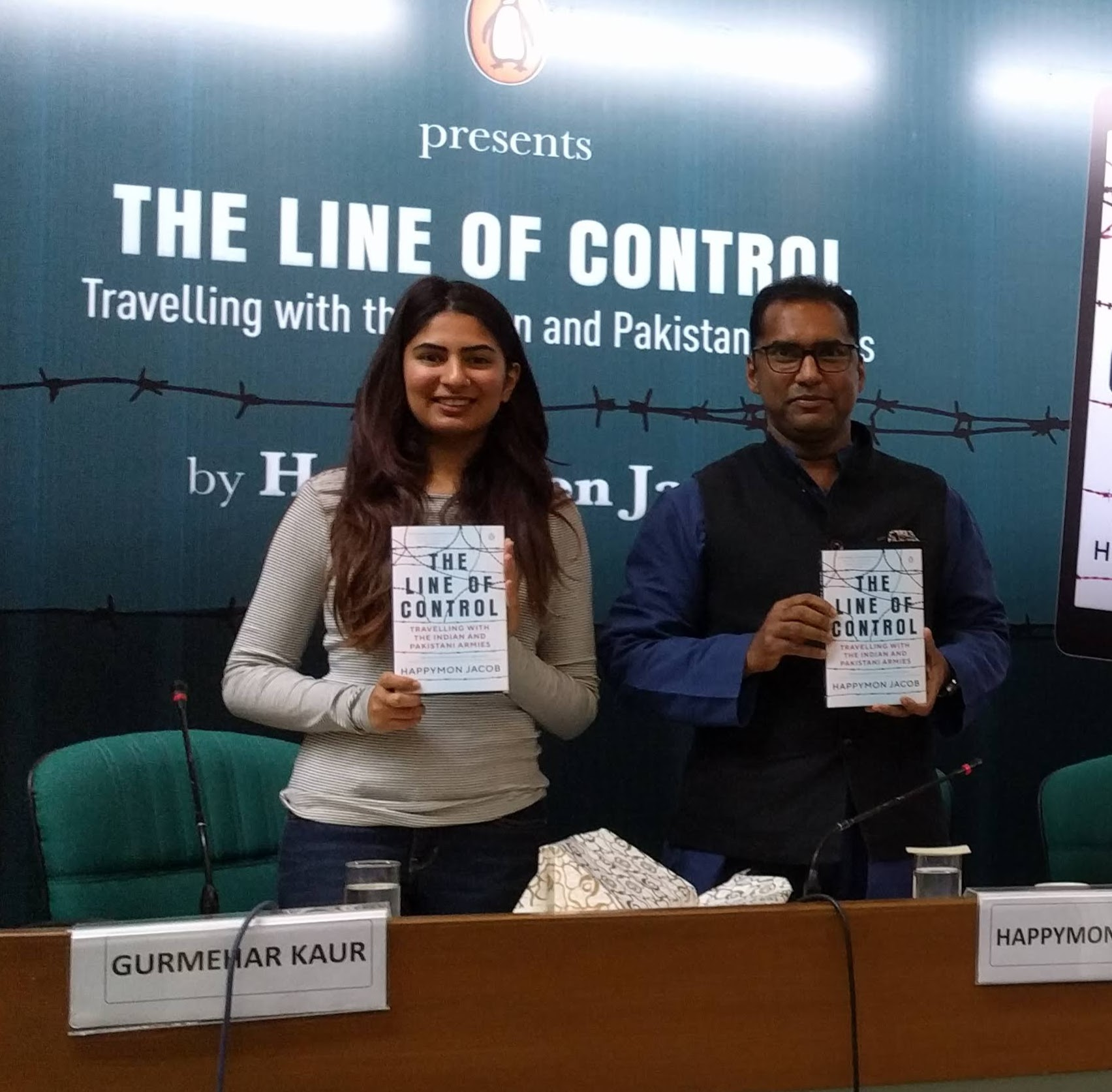
- Kaur with the author Happymon Jacob at the book launch of The Line of Control: Travelling with the Indian and Pakistani Armies
- Born: 24 September 1996 (age 30); Jalandhar, Punjab, India
- Education: B.A. (Hons.) in English literature at Lady Shri Ram College for Women, University of Delhi
- Alma mater: Somerville College, Oxford
- Political party: Indian National Congress

Gurmehar Kaur (born 24 September 1996) is an Indian student activist and author. Graduating from Lady Shri Ram College, she pursued her masters from Somerville College, University of Oxford. Kaur is also an ambassador for Postcards for Peace, a UK-based charitable organisation that helps eliminate any form of discrimination.

Gurmehar Kaur came in the limelight as she was a part of the 'Save DU campaign' following the February 2017 clashes at Ramjas College between members of the Students Federation of India (SFI) and the Akhil Bharatiya Vidyarthi Parishad (ABVP) when JNU students Umar Khalid and Shehla Rashid Shora were invited for a campus seminar. Earlier, she was in the news due to a video she released.

In October 2017, Time magazine used the phrase "free speech warrior" in expressing their opinion of Kaur and included her in their "10 Next Generation Leaders" list for 2017. Her debut, a memoir, called Small Acts of Freedom which was published in January 2018 by Penguin Random House, was shortlisted for the Sahitya Akademi YUVA Puraskar in 2020.

== Early life ==
Gurmehar Kaur was born on 24 September 1996 to Rajvinder Kaur and Captain Mandeep Singh in Jalandhar. She completed her education at Harvest International School, Ludhiana. Her father, Mandeep Singh, was one of the seven Indian Army personnel martyred at 1:15 am IST after a Rashtriya Rifle camp was attacked by terrorists in Jammu and Kashmir on 6 August 1999. Kaur holds a degree in Literature from Lady Shri Ram College for Women. She pursued her MSc in Modern South Asian Studies from the Somerville College, Oxford University.

== Controversies ==
=== Indo-Pak peace message video ===
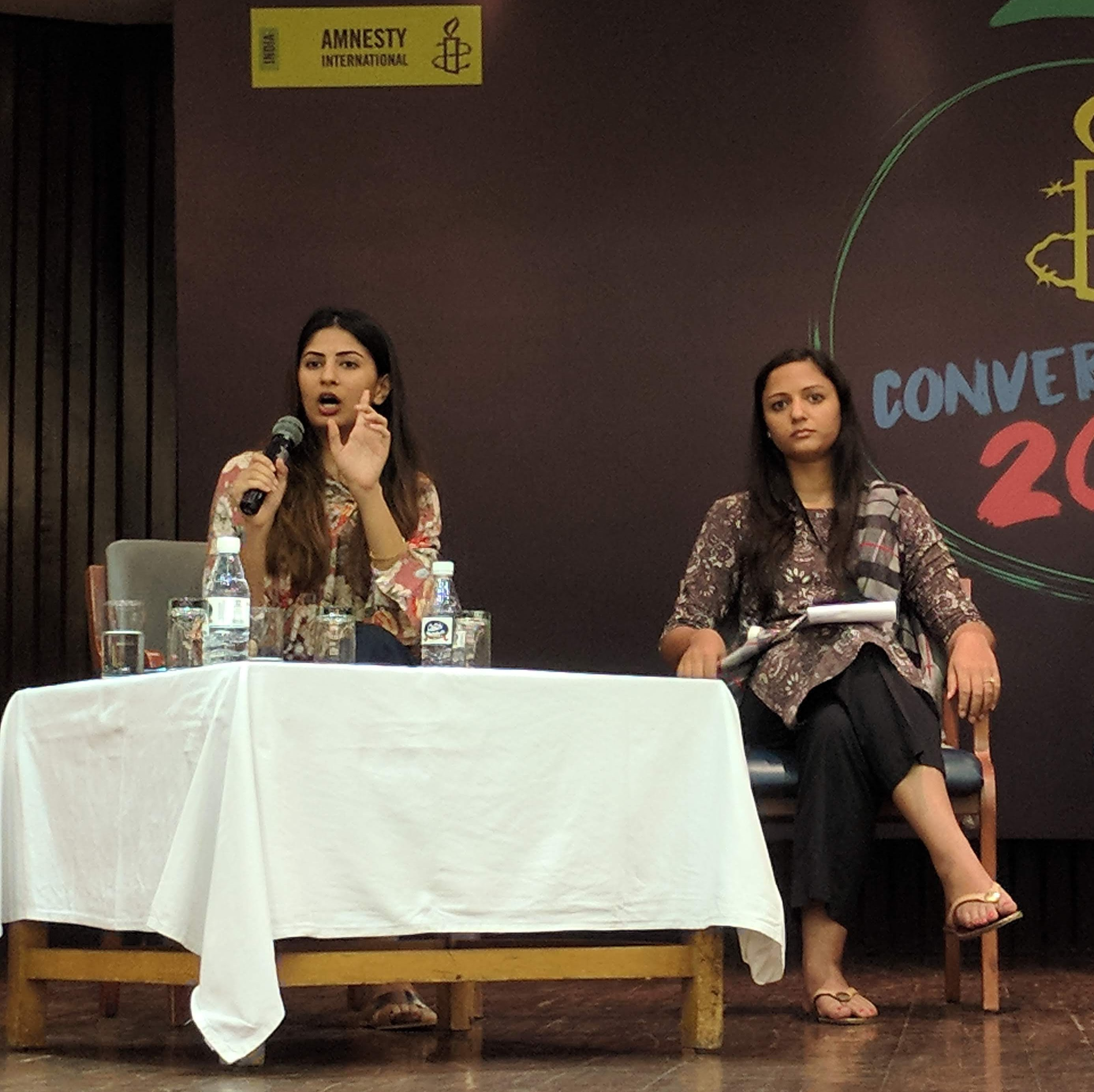
Gurmehar Kaur (left) at an Amnesty International event, Conversations 18', in New Delhi. Shehla Rashid (right) also pictured.

On 28 April 2016, a video was uploaded to Facebook by Voice of Ram (Ram Subramanian), featuring Gurmehar Kaur. The video was also uploaded to YouTube by Voice of Ram. Gurmehar Kaur launched the #ProfileForPeace campaign in April 2016, questioning the calibre of leadership of India and Pakistan in the video, and advocating "peace" between India and Pakistan. She styled herself as a "soldier for peace" fighting against war.

The video went viral in February 2017, after Gurmehar came forward with a social media message against ABVP at Delhi University, a student federation belonging to the Sangh Parivar. It attracted much controversy and ridicule, particularly a statement: "Pakistan did not kill my dad, war killed him."

In 2017, Union Minister of State for Home Affairs of India Kiren Rijiju commented on her video that "Some Political forces are behind her statements (Spoiling the minds of the students)". Former cricketer Virender Sehwag posted an image saying, "I didn't score triple centuries, my bat did". Javed Akhtar also commented on this issue as he counterattacked on all those who were against Gurmehar.

Gurmehar's mother showed support for her daughter clarifying that "Her message in the video should be seen in a larger perspective. What she actually wanted to say was that war always brings destruction. I never wanted her to look at people of Pakistan or any other country with hatred. Situations make people kill each other during a war."

=== Save DU Campaign ===
She was virtually part of Save DU campaign against ABVP in February 2017 in which she opposed the violence that erupted at the Ramjas College Campus after the lectures of Umar Khalid and Shehla Rashid Shora were cancelled due to ABVP's protest. She received death and rape threats for starting this campaign and later on she left the campaign.

== Books ==
- Small Acts of Freedom (2018), Penguin Random House
- The Young and the Restless (Youth and Politics in India) (2019), Penguin Books
