= Aam Aadmi Sena =

- Abbreviation: AAS
- Leader: Prabhat Kumar
- President: Prabhat Kumar
- Chairman: Pawan Pandit
- Founder: Pawan Pandit
- Founded: 14 January 2011
- Ideology: Anti-corruption

Website
- www.aamaadmisena.org

Aam Aadmi Sena is a political wing of Aam Aadmi Sangathan and dissident faction of former workers of Aam Aadmi Party, an Indian political party commonly referred as AAP.

== Group platform ==
Through their actions, members of Aam Aadmi Sena have demanded a responsive government, increased financial regulations, and greater accountability of government officials. The members of Aam Aadmi Sena have embraced the use of direct action in their protests.

== Leadership ==
Within AAS, there are organisational units, such as one for states unit and one called national working committee and youth, trade workers or mahila morcha.

== Complaints with AAP ==
Aam Aadmi Sena was reportedly formed after AAP members grew dissatisfied with the ruling tactics of Chief Minister of Delhi Arvind Kejriwal. Amongst the complaints made by members of Aam Aadmi Sena against AAP include the charges that AAP tolerated corruption tried to divide Hindus and Muslims.

== Actions ==
In February 2014, members of Aam Aadmi Sena peacefully protested outside the residence of Aam Aadmi Party official Arvind Kejriwal after he had resigned from the post of Chief Minister of Delhi after 49 days in office. Among the accusations made by members of AAS were that Kejriwal took no action to deal with issues facing Delhi residents.

In May 2014, a large group of activists from Aam Aadmi Sena marched through Delhi in a demonstration against the Delhi government, and against Kejriwal in particular, over failure to provide services, including the deployment of marshals on DTC buses. Later in the month, members protested against Kejriwal outside the Delhi High Court during proceedings related to court orders seeking to place Kejriwal into custody.

In June 2014, residents of New Delhi continued to deal with rolling brown-outs, also referred to as load-shedding, due to peak demands for electricity and the consequences of damage to the power grid following a storm. Some members of Aam Aadmi Sena threatened to cut the electrical power supply to the residences of Congress president Sonia Gandhi and AAP leader Arvind Kejriwal in order to spur the officials into action to deal with the summer power outages.

In July 2014, members of Aam Aadmi Sena again peacefully protested outside the Kejriwal's residence.

In October 2014, activists from the group protested outside the residence of Union Finance minister Arun Jaitley. The activists were pressuring the Finance Minister to disclose the holders of black money, which is untaxed income earned in the black market.

In April 2015, a member of Aam Aadmi Sena reportedly threw ink on AAP leader Somnath Bharti after a farmer committed suicide during an AAP rally.

In January 2016, a woman who identified as a member of Aam Aadmi Sena was reported to have thrown ink on Kejriwal at a press event in Delhi. Aam Aadmi Sena president Pawan Pandit later told the press that the member who threw ink on Kejriwal had video evidence of corruption that the government of the Chief Minister of Delhi took no action to address. Officials with AAP claimed that the attack was made possible by a security breach for which the New Delhi police were responsible. They further claimed that the ink attack was part of a "big rehearsal" to possibly "physically harm" Kejriwal in the future. They also accused officials of the rival Bharatiya Janata Party of participating in a conspiracy that resulted in the attack. Officials from the BJP and police rejected the accusations.

In February 2016 and in the wake of the sedition controversy at Jawaharlal Nehru University (JNU), individuals vandalised the exterior of the Communist Party of India (Marxist) (CPI(M)) headquarters in New Delhi. At least one of the three individuals arrested for the attack claimed to be a member of Aam Aadmi Sena. Prior to the attack, an official speaking on behalf of CPI(M) had called for the release of a Jawaharlal Nehru University student leader facing sedition charges following a pro-Afzal Guru protest at JNU. In its report of the vandalism, The Indian Express noted that CPI(M) officials claimed that the attack on its headquarters "was committed by right-wing forces."

== See also ==
- Government of Delhi
