= Baysal =

Baysal is a surname. Notable people with the surname include:

- Deniz Baysal (born 1991), Turkish actress
- Nurcan Baysal (born 1975), Turkish journalist
