= Ishrat Jahan =

Ishrat Jahan may refer to:

- Ishrat Jahan (lawyer) – an Indian practising lawyer and former municipal councillor in Delhi
- Ishrat Jahan encounter killing – a killing of four persons, one of whom was named Ishrat Jahan, by police and intelligence officers in Ahmedabad, Gujarat, India
- Ishrat Jahan Chaity – a Bangladeshi actress
