= Rekha Palli =

Judge of Delhi High Court

Hon'ble Ms. Justice (Retd.) Rekha Palli

Judge of Delhi High Court
- In office 15 May 2017 – 8 March 2025
- Nominated by: J. S. Khehar
- Appointed by: Pranab Mukherjee

Personal details
- Born: 9 March 1963 (age 63)
- Education: Hindu College, Delhi; University of Delhi

Rekha Palli (born 9 March 1963) is a former judge of the Delhi High Court in India. She has been the judge in a number of politically significant cases, including those relating to the disqualification of Aam Aadmi Party MLAs, the qualifications for enrolment in the Central Industrial Security Force, and the disappearance of Delhi University student Najeeb Ahmad. As a counsel, Palli also represented Indian Air Force officers in a significant case that resulted in ending of a discriminatory practice that denied the grant of permanent commissions to female officers.

== Life ==
Palli was educated at the Lady Irwin School in New Delhi, and studied science at Hindu College before obtaining a degree in law in 1986, from the Faculty of Law at Delhi University.

== Career ==
=== Litigation ===
Palli practiced law in Delhi, as well as at the Punjab and Haryana High Court, and the Supreme Court of India, after enrolling at the bar in 1986. In 2015, she was designated as a senior counsel by the Delhi High Court.

In 2010, Palli represented nine women officers of the Indian Air Force, in a case by which they challenged the force's practice of denying permanent commissions to women officers. The case was filed after a Supreme Court order directed the Indian Army to grant permanent commissions to women officers in the same manner that such commissions were granted to male officers. The Delhi High Court ruled in favor of granting permanent commissions to qualified women officers, following which the Indian Air Force commenced granting short service commissions to them.

=== Judicial career ===
Justice Rekha Palli was appointed a judge to the Delhi High Court on 15 May 2017.

In 2017, Palli ordered a case concerning the disappearance and suspected murder of Delhi University student Najeeb Ahmad, after an alleged altercation with members of the Akhil Bharatiya Vidyarthi Parishad, to be transferred to the Central Bureau of Investigation. The case gained significant public attention following protests from Delhi University students about the lack of results while the case was being investigated by the Delhi Police.

In 2018, Palli heard a politically significant case concerning the disqualification of twenty-three members of the Delhi Legislative Assembly, belonging to the Aam Aadmi Party. The case gained a great deal of public attention, before Palli allowed it to be withdrawn with the consent of the parties involved. In 2018, Palli and another judge, Hima Kohli, held that it was legal for the Union Government to terminate the employment of members of the Central Industrial Security Force who tested as color-blind.

As on year 2024, Justice Palli is also serving as Chairperson of Juvenile Justice Committee of Delhi High Court, where she monitors implementation of Juvenile Justice Act in National Capital Territory of Delhi.
