= Shehla Rashid =

Social activist (born 1988)

Shehla Rashid Shora
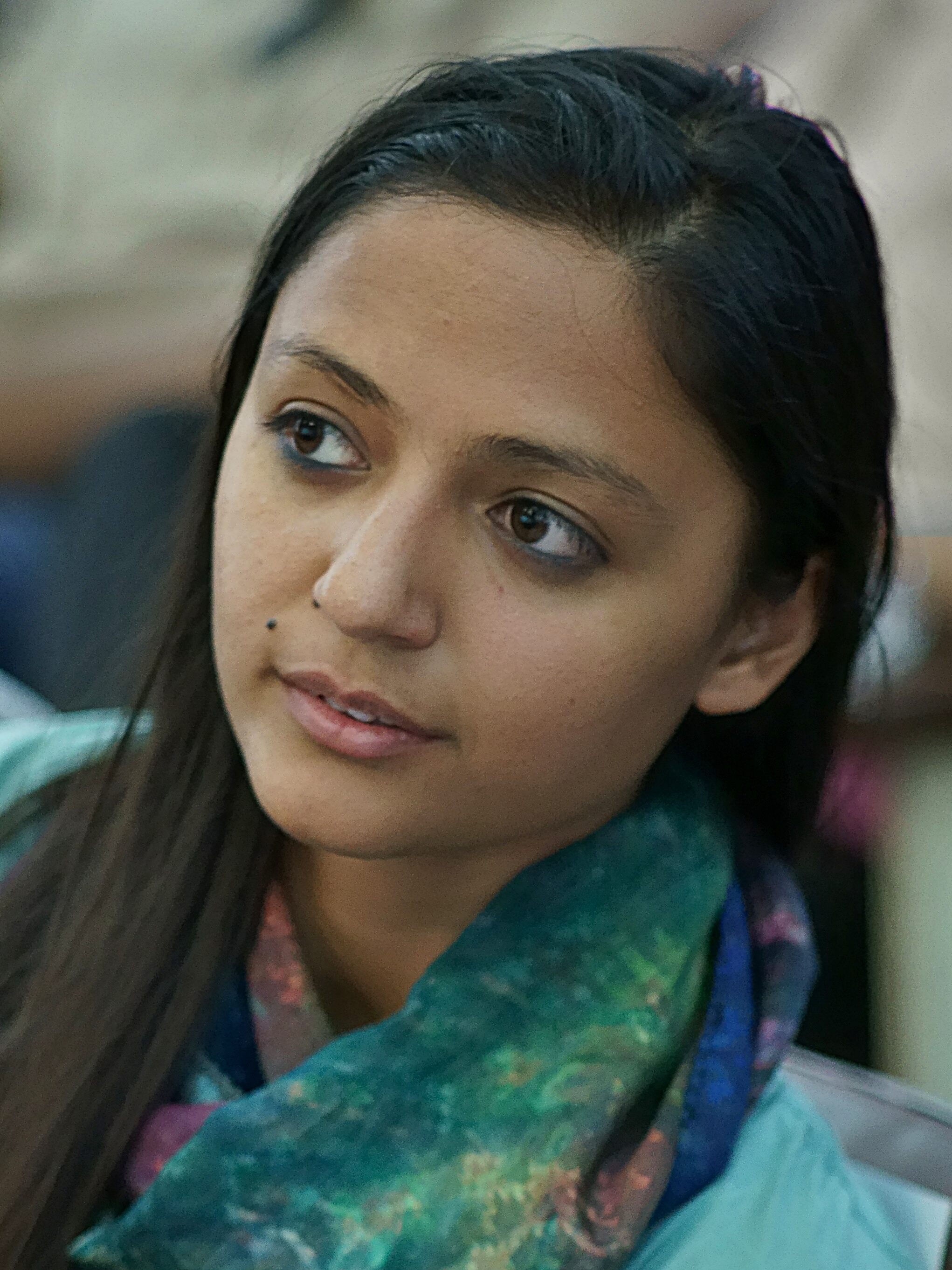
- Rashid in April 2016
- Born: April 30, 1988 (age 38); Srinagar, Jammu and Kashmir, India
- Education: NIT Srinagar (B.Tech.); Jawaharlal Nehru University (M.A.)

Shehla Rashid Shora is an Indian Kashmiri social activist, former leader of the Jawaharlal Nehru University Students' Union and author of the book 'Role Models'. She rose to prominence whilst leading the student agitation calling for the release for Kanhaiya Kumar, Umar Khalid and others who were arrested on charges of sedition in February 2016 for participating and organizing sloganeering in JNU.

Shora was vocal about the human rights situation in Kashmir, particularly highlighting the plight of minors held in custody awaiting trial, and had been active since 2010 after organising a youth leadership programme in Kashmir. She played a leading role in organising the 'Occupy UGC movement' and the decision to "camp" at University Grants Commission headquarters to protest the withdrawal of non-NET fellowship. She led the protest march to the Ministry of Human Resources Development to ask for an increase in graduate student stipends.

On 16 February 2019 Shora posted a tweet stating that a group of Kashmiri girls were trapped in a hostel in Dehra Dun by a mob demanding their expulsion. The Uttarakhand police subsequently filed a first information report against her for disrupting public tranquility and intent to provoke breach of peace by spreading rumours. She had briefly joined the Jammu and Kashmir People's Movement political party, founded by Shah Faesal on 17 March 2019.

She currently works as an Assistant Professor of Sociology at Higher Education Department, Government of Jammu and Kashmir.

== Early life and education ==
Shehla Rashid Shora was born on April 30, 1988, in the old city of Srinagar in the Habba Kadal locality.

Shora studied computer engineering at the National Institute of Technology, Srinagar and participated in a ten-week certificate programme in political leadership at the Indian Institute of Management Bangalore. After graduating from NIT Srinagar she worked as a software engineer with HCL Technologies. She raised the issues of juvenile justice and acid attacks on women in Kashmir but said that "the political space there [was] too restricted." Eventually, she joined the Jawaharlal Nehru University, completing an M.A. in sociology and then studying for an MPhil in Law and Governance. She then pursued a PhD from JNU, her thesis based on "how algorithm based decision-making affects policy making".

== Activism ==
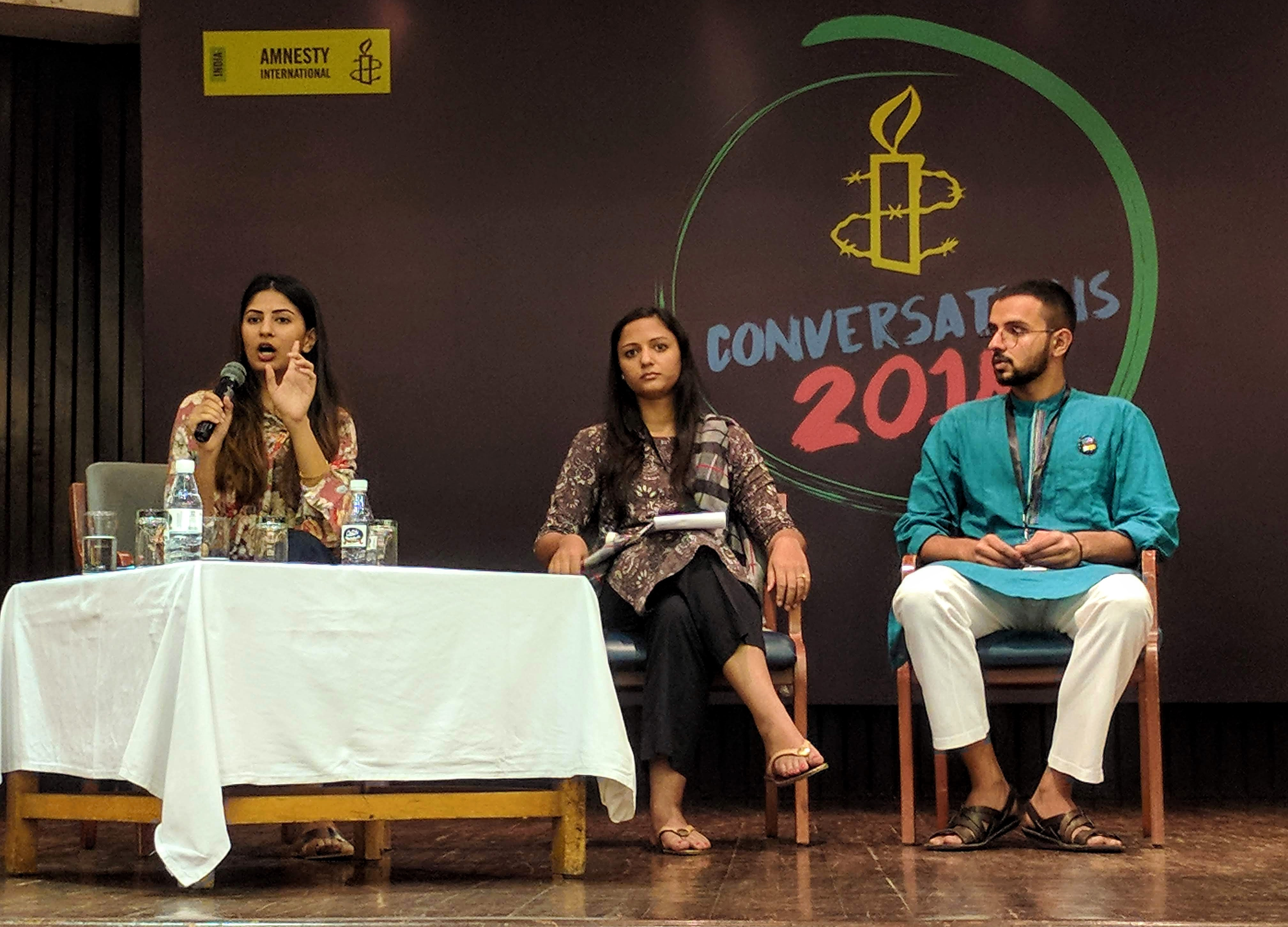
Shehla Rashid Shora (center) at an Amnesty International event in New Delhi in 2018. Gurmehar Kaur (left) also pictured.

=== Kashmir ===
Shora is vocal about the human rights situation in Kashmir, particularly for ensuring justice to minor undertrials and has been active since 2010 when she was part of organising a youth leadership programme in Kashmir. She participated in a seminar asking to change internet harassment laws.

In 2013, when Pragaash, an all-female band composed of young Muslim women, faced online harassment and death threats from Islamic conservatives in Kashmir, she came out vocally in support of the band and condemned the online abuse and threats directed at them. She said an interview to the Times of India: "They may quit because of intolerance, rape and murder threats, because of our selectively conservative and hypocritical worldview, because men can issue rape threats to women and no one would call it unIslamic, because men can pinch our butts in the bus and no one would speak up, because men can jack off to item numbers in private but three innocent girls performing in perfectly modest clothing outrages our so-called morality". She launched a counter online campaign 'I support Pragaash, Kashmir's first all-girls' rock band' to mobilise support for the girls.

=== Delhi ===
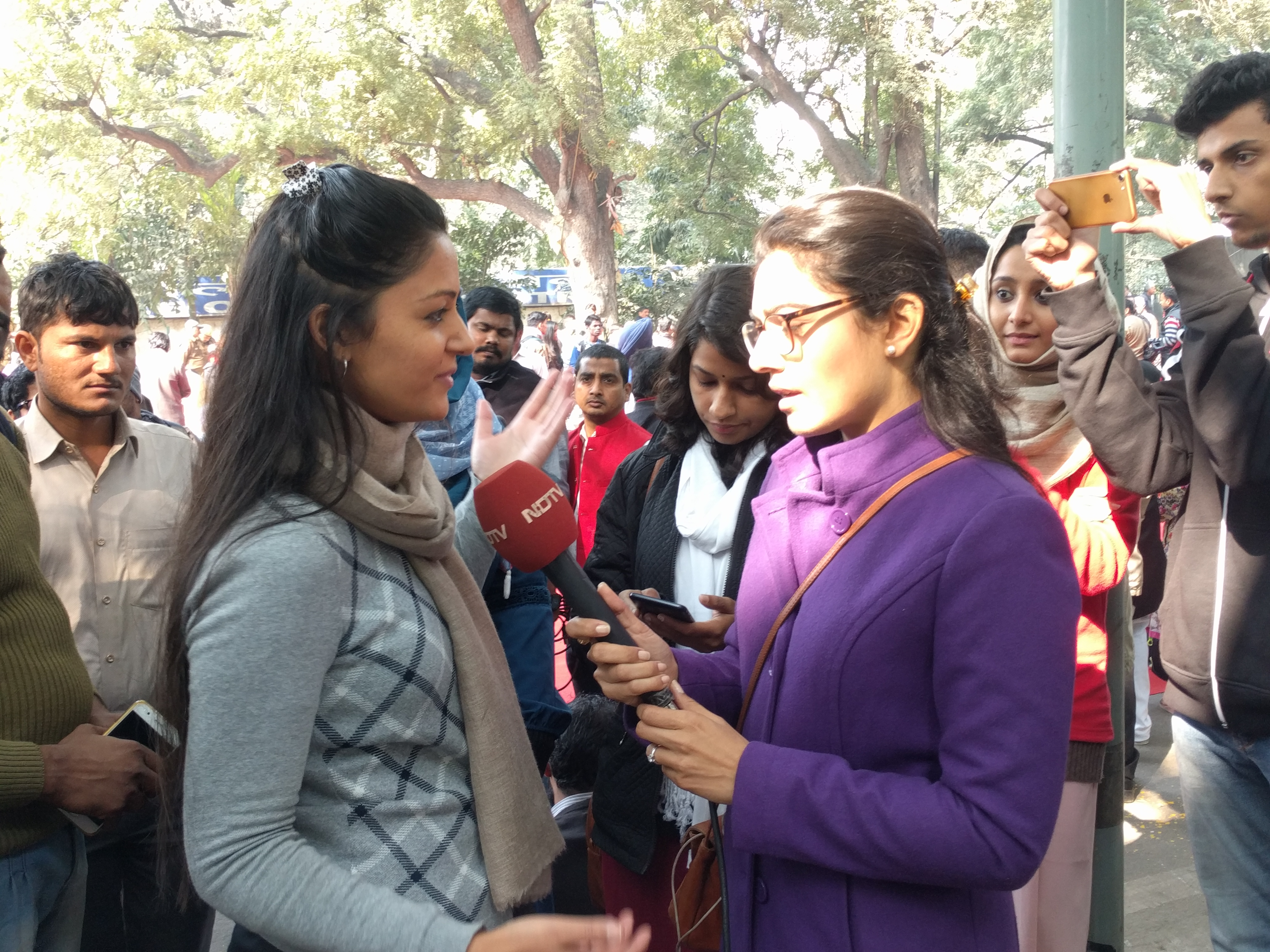
Shehla Rashid (left) being interviewed by NDTV during the Yuva Hunkar Rally at Parliament Street, New Delhi, India in 2018.

In April 2014 Shora unsuccessfully contested the student election to the Gender Sensitisation Committee against Sexual Harassment (this is the internal complaint committee of JNU that deals with sexual harassment).

In September 2015, she contested the election for vice-president of the JNU student union, as the nominee of the Left-backed All India Students Association, and won it, beating the ABVP's candidate Valentina Brahma by over 200 votes. She was the first Kashmiri woman to win a student union election at the JNU and the highest polled candidate of that year. She said that there was enough space to articulate her political spirit at the JNU. However, her challenge was to "convince voters in favour of a Kashmir woman from a non-political background."

Soon after getting elected, Shora condemned the ban on student politics at the Kashmir University. She said that, if ideas are suppressed, they would resurface in "undesirable ways." In October 2015, she led a protest against the University Grants Commission (UGC) decision to cut student scholarships for MPhil and PhD students except for those that passed the 'national eligibility test'. Under the banner "Occupy UGC," students from the JNU were joined by those from the Delhi University, Jamia Milia Islamia and the Ambedkar University Delhi in protests outside the UGC for over a month. She is said to have ironed out the divergences between the AISA and the JNUSU and turned into the "face of the movement."

In February 2016, Kanhaiya Kumar, the president of the JNU students' union, was arrested on sedition charges for sloganeering. Several other student leaders were charged with sedition, including the general secretary Rama Naga and a former president, Ashutosh Kumar. Shehla Rashid ran the union during the interim period as she was the only office bearer not facing charges. On 14 February 2016, Shehla Rashid gave a speech to a gathering of 3,000-4,000 protesting students and faculty members on the JNU campus following a protest march. On 18 February 2016, around 10,000 people joined a march in defence of JNU through the streets of Delhi, on Shehla Rashid Shora's call. On 2 March, she led a protest march to the Parliament, demanding the repeal of the sedition law. The protesters also called for the enactment of a 'Rohith Act' for ending caste-based discrimination in educational institutions. The protest was joined by students and teachers from universities across Delhi as well as the families of Rohith Vemula and Umar Khalid.

== Controversies ==
Aligarh Muslim University Student Union (AMUSU) filed a First Information Report (FIR) against Shehla Rashid in February 2017, alleging that a Facebook post she had made used "objectionable" language about Muhammad, the prophet of Islam.

On 27 October 2018, she welcomed newly converted Irish singer Shuhada’ Davitt into a Muslim community which generated online backlash. Several days later Shehla Rashid deactivated her Twitter account (which is now active again).

In February 2019, Dehradun Police filed a FIR against her for a tweet she posted on 16 February 2019 where she had written "15-20 Kashmiri girls trapped in a hostel in Dehradun for hours now. mobs outside are baying for their blood. Police is present but unable to disperse the mob." Police dismissed her allegation as rumour. The FIR was filed under sections 504, 505 and 153b of the Indian Penal Code.

In August 2019, she tweeted that Indian Army was torturing Kashmiris as a consequence of Indian revocation of Jammu and Kashmir's special status. The allegation was rejected by the army as baseless. Supreme Court lawyer Alok Srivastsava filed a complaint under offence of sedition and sought criminal action against Shehla Rashid over her allegations.

Her estranged father Abdul Rashid Shora, alleged that her NGOs have undertaken anti-Indian activities and took large amount of money to join Kashmir's politics and this warrants investigation. He claimed that his life is under threat from her and other family members. She replied that it was "absolutely baseless and disgusting" comments which came after court ordered ban on his entry in their Srinagar home on the account of domestic violence.

== Views ==
Shehla Rashid has been a vocal critic of the Modi government. However, in an interview with ANI in November 2023, she commended Prime Minister Narendra Modi and Home Minister Amit Shah for securing a “bloodless” political resolution to the Jammu and Kashmir dispute. Shora credited them for bringing a "stable governance and economy" to the region. In her X post, Shehla Rashid wrote, “What caused my change of heart is the realisation that the Hon’ble PM Narendra Modi is a selfless man who is taking radical decisions to transform India. He has braved intense criticism but remained steadfast to his vision of inclusive development that leaves no one behind.”

== Political party ==
Shehla Rashid joined Jammu & Kashmir People's movement (JKPM), a political party started by former IAS Officer Shah Faesal, in 2019. However, after 6 months, she left politics stating that her participation will legitimize the "suppression" on Kashmiris.

== Works ==
Shehla has written a book titled "Role Models: Inspiring Stories of Indian Muslim Achievers" published in October 2024. She postulates the idea of a ‘Muslim civil society’ where Muslims can go forward in the democratic political system.
