= Gabela =

Gabela may refer to:

- Gabela, Bosnia and Herzegovina, a village near Čapljina
- Gabela, Angola, a city in Amboim, Cuanza Sul
