= Laurinda Manuel Gouveia =

Angolan human rights activist (born 1989)

- Born: c. 1989; Gabela, Angola
- Other name: Kimpa Nvinta Gouveia
- Education: Catholic University of Angola
- Occupation: Human rights activist
- Children: 1
- Awards: Front Line Defenders Award for Human Rights Defenders at Risk (2026)

Laurinda Manuel Gouveia (born c. 1989), also known as Kimpa Nvinta Gouveia, is an Angolan human rights activist. Known for her campaigning for women's rights and democracy in Angola, in 2026 she received the Front Line Defenders Award for Human Rights Defenders at Risk.

== Personal life ==
Gouveia was born and raised in Gabela, a town in the Cuanza Sul Province of Angola. She later moved to Luanda, where she studied philosophy at the Catholic University of Angola. To fund her studies, Gouveia worked as a cleaner and as a barbecue seller in Cassenda.

Gouveia was in a relationship with fellow human rights activist Nito Alves. She has a daughter.

== Activism ==
Gouveia first became known as an activist in 2011, when she began participating in regular demonstrations against José Eduardo dos Santos, the president of Angola. She led several campaigns calling for justice for victims of police brutality, as well as accountability for the perpetrators of state violence.

A member of the Luanda rap scene, Gouveia worked as a trainer for Hip Hop and Citizenship (Portuguese: Hip Hop e Cidadania), a project that aimed to bring young Angolans closer to the values of citizenship, civic participation, and respect for human rights. She went on to found or co-found several civil initiatives, including the Balumukenu Association (Associação Balumukenu), which worked to empower young people, document human rights violations, and promote civic participation; and the School of Human Rights and Community Leadership (Escola de Direitos Humanos e Liderança na Comunidade) to support and empower young human rights activists.

Gouveia has campaigned for the release of political prisoners and victims of state violence. In 2026, she advocated for Inácio Pessela, a 15-year-old boy who had been paralysed after being shot by police officers during the July 2025 Angolan protests.

== Arrests and imprisonment ==
In 2014, Gouveia was arrested during a demonstration held in Independence Square, Luanda against dos Santos. During her detention, Gouveia reported being physically assaulted by multiple police officers, including with a broomstick and wires, later sharing photos of her injuries that were subsequently shared online. Following her arrest, Gouveia was made homeless by her family.

In June 2015, Gouveia was among 15 members of a book club at the Kiazele bookshop in Luanda who were arrested by police officers in what became known as the Angola 15+2 case. The group had been reading From Dictatorship to Democracy, a 1994 book by Gene Sharp about how to end a dictatorship and prevent the rise of a new one. While 13 members were imprisoned pending trial, Gouveia and fellow activist Rosa Kusso Conde were released on bail on charges of planning a rebellion. Gouveia's trial began on 16 November 2015 at the Luanda Provincial Court. She was sentenced to four and a half years in prison, which she served at a prison in Viana, alongside Conde and her partner, Alves. On 8 May 2016, Gouveia and Conde went on hunger strike.

In 2024, Gouveia was arrested alongside her husband and seven-month-old child while campaigning for the release of political prisoners held in Angola. Gouveia and her baby were detained for 73 hours before being released.

== Recognition ==
In 2026, Gouveia won the Front Line Defenders Award in recognition of her human rights work, promoting women's rights, fundamental freedoms, and participatory democracy in Angola. She won alongside Adda Vyctoria Caetano, Umar Khalid, Ljiljana Nešić, and Ahmadreza Haeri.
