= Catholic University of Angola =

Coordinates: 8.85731°S 13.2815°E

The Catholic University of Angola (Universidade Católica de Angola, UCAN) is a Catholic institution in Angola's capital of Luanda. On 7 August 1992 (34 years ago), the government of Angola allowed the Angolan Catholic Church to establish its own university. Through approval by the Episcopal Conference it started teaching on 22 February 1999 (27 years ago). It is a private institution and one of 12 recognized private universities. Msgr. Manuel Imbamba is the "magno chanceler" and Father Vicente Cauchi is the rector.

== Academics ==
In 2012 it had about 6,000 enrolled students. The language of classes is Portuguese, although English as a second language (ESL) is offered. Four departments have been founded: social sciences, economics, law and engineering.

Notable professors include Fernando José de França Dias Van-Dúnem. He is a long-time Angolan politician and current member of the Pan-African Parliament.

== Faculties ==
- Faculty of Social Sciences (director: Prof. António Costa)
- Faculty of Law (director: Prof. Adérito Correia)
- Faculty of Economics (director: Prof. Justino Pinto de Andrade)
- Faculty of Engineering (director: Prof. Aires Veloso)

== Campus ==
The university's location in Luanda was for long at the former Colégio São José de Cluny. This remodeled building is in front of the Museum of History, one block from Kinaxixi Square, and housed the first two faculties of the university. It was restituted to the Sisters of Cluny in 2010. The final buildings complex of the Catholic University was on a selected site, in the Palanca part of Luanda, and will host additional faculties. Subsidiaries are considered in other important Angolan cities.

== Funding ==
Many nations have contributed to the establishment of the university, most prominently the United States, but also Portugal, South Africa, Norway, Spain and Italy in the form of private business assistance and non-governmental agencies. UCAN receives all of its government funds because of decree 20/82 in 1982 that required petroleum companies operating in Angola to invest into educational and training programs the amount of $0.15 (15¢ of U.S. dollar) per barrel of oil produced. These are commonly known as "Training Levy Funds."

The Angola Educational Assistance Fund (AEAF), a Boston-based non-profit organization, has been working with the Catholic University of Angola and has participated in the establishment of a computer and Internet access center.

The Council of Ministers of the Republic of Angola approved on 11 July 1997, decree no. 51/97, in an effort to provide a funding mechanism for higher education institutions in the country. The decree states that a portion of the Training Levy Funds, in the amount of 1¢ per oil barrel, will be used to finance the Catholic University. With Angola producing 300 million barrels of oil in 1998, this amounted to a large majority of the funding for the university.

== Notable alumni ==
- Laurinda Manuel Gouveia (born 1989), human rights activist.
