= Ljiljana Nešić =

Serbian human rights activist

- Љиљана Нешић
- Born: Leskovac, Yugoslavia
- Citizenship: Serbia
- Occupation: Women's rights activist
- Years active: 2007–present
- Known for: Advocacy for women in southern Serbia

Ljiljana Nešić (Serbian: Љиљана Нешић) is a Serbian human rights activist. She is the president of the Citizens' Association of Women for Peace, and has campaigned against patriarchy, nationalism, militarism and fascism in Serbia.

== Biography ==
Nešić co-established the Citizens' Association of Women for Peace (Žene za mir) in 2007 in Leskovac. It runs a telephone line for women and children who are victims of domestic abuse and also provides support to empower women who experience abuse, in addition to promoting, educating and protecting women's rights and building peace with non-violence. The helpline had first been established in 1994 by Nešić and other activists. During the COVID-19 pandemic, the Citizens' Association of Women for Peace worked with SOS Vojvodina to develop a mobile app to provide chat support and emergency services, including a panic button, for victims of domestic abuse.

Nešić has particularly advocated for women in southern Serbia, who she has described as being "generally less informed" about their rights and have less access to state institutions. She advocated for female murder victims in Jablanica District where 14 women had been murdered between 2011 and 2025.

Nešić is a member of the Integrity Network (Мрежа интегритета, Mreža integriteta), founded by the Belgrade Centre for Security Policy, which aims to monitor, document and report on cases of institutional abuse by Serbian authorities.

=== Harassment ===
From 2022, Nešić and her Citizens' Association of Women for Peace colleague Marija Trajković have been subjected to harassment including threats, cyber attacks, smear campaigns and criminal complaints. They also reported being stalked, attacked and monitored by unknown men, including in the street.

On 2 November 2022, Nešić was interrogated as part of an ongoing criminal investigation into the Citizens' Association of Women for Peace being involved in organised crime following a criminal complaint made by Miodrag Stanković, the president of the Association of Fathers and Mothers and the Pensioners' Union, to the Criminal Police for Economic Crime of Belgrade. The complaint, filed on 29 October, stemmed from an earlier complaint made to the Public Prosecutor's Office in Leskovac alleging that the hotline used by the Citizens' Association of Women for Peace was improperly used and demonstrated discrimination against men. The complaint had been rejected as unfounded. The human rights organisation Front Line Defenders expressed concern that the organisation was being targeted because of its support of women victims of violence.

On 22 December 2025, Nešić's home in Leskovac was broken into and ransacked by unidentified individuals. This occurred days after Nešić appeared on television on 17 December publicly addressing a recent series of femicides in Leskovac and the failure of local authorities to address the issue of violence against women. Nothing of value had been taken from the property, with money and other valuables left behind, leading to human rights organisations such as Front Line Defenders suggesting the incident was not an attempted burglary but rather than act of intimidation against Nešić.

On 26 December, Nešić told local police in Leskovac that she believed the incident was staged to intimidate her due to her role as president of the Citizens' Association of Women for Peace. She expressed concern on 28 December that the police had shared with her CCTV footage from her neighbour's home that appeared to have been edited to cut out the period of time where the incident took place.

The BeFem feminist collective issued a statement condemning the attack on Nešić's home, describing it as occurring in the wider context of ongoing attacks on members of the Citizens' Association of Women for Peace due to their work addressing issues of institutional failures concerning protecting women and women's rights in Jablanica District. The Belgrade Centre for Security Policy strongly condemned the attack and called for an "urgent, thorough and independent" investigation. Over 70 organisations signed a statement condemning the attack and stated it was an attempt to "intimidate and silence" Nešić.

== Recognition ==
In October 2026, Nešić was named as the Europe and Central Asia recipient of the 2026 Front Line Defenders Award, in recognition of her work for the advancement and protection of women's rights over thirty years. Other laureates included Laurinda Manuel Gouveia and Umar Khalid.
