= Sharifa Madrakhimova =

Uzbekistani journalist and human rights defender

- Other name: Sharifakhon Madrakhimova
- Occupations: Journalist; human rights defender
- Known for: Reporting on rights issues in Uzbekistan, including labour rights and monitoring the cotton sector
- Awards: Front Line Defenders Award for Human Rights Defenders at Risk (Europe and Central Asia laureate, 2025)

Sharifa (Sharifakhon) Madrakhimova is an Uzbekistani journalist and human rights defender from the Fergana Region of Uzbekistan. Her work has included monitoring and reporting on rights issues ranging from labour rights to social issues, including issues affecting farmers and the cotton sector.

In 2025, Madrakhimova received the Front Line Defenders Award for Human Rights Defenders at Risk for Europe and Central Asia.

== Journalism and human rights work ==
Madrakhimova works as a freelance reporter and has collaborated with media outlets in Uzbekistan. She monitors and reports on rights issues in Uzbekistan ranging from labour rights to social issues. Her reporting and advocacy have addressed civil and political rights, environmental rights, accountability, and the rights of women, farmers, and people with disabilities. Her work has also included monitoring conditions linked to Uzbekistan’s cotton sector and cotton harvests.

== Harassment and intimidation ==
In May 2025, Madrakhimova had faced smear campaigns and intimidation tactics in connection with her reporting and public activity, attributing threats to her work covering farmers’ and labourers’ rights.

In April 2024 Madrakhimova and fellow human rights defender Umida Niyazova were confronted outside Madrakhimova’s home by a pro-government blogger and another man, while a defamatory video about her was later published online. Madrakhimova faces routine interference and harassment connected to her monitoring and reporting on labour rights in the cotton sector.

== Passport incident and travel restriction (2025) ==
In May 2025, Madrakhimova was unable to travel to Dublin to attend the Front Line Defenders Award ceremony on 22 May, after her passport, returned to her following an Irish visa process, was found damaged. On 7 May 2025, Madrakhimova received her passport by courier with an Irish visa stamp, and the area containing the biometric chip had visible burn damage that invalidated the document. The biometric chip had been destroyed by fire and the replacement passport arrived after her scheduled departure date.

Madrakhimova believed the incident was connected to her work and Front Line Defenders called it intimidation and a violation of freedom of movement.

== Awards and recognition ==
- Front Line Defenders Award for Human Rights Defenders at Risk (Europe and Central Asia laureate), 2025.
