= Front Line Defenders =

Irish-based human rights organization

- Founded: 2001
- Type: Non-profit; NGO
- Location(s): Global; General secretariat at Temple Road, Blackrock, Dublin, Ireland
- Services: Protecting human rights
- Website: www.frontlinedefenders.org

Front Line Defenders, or The International Foundation for the Protection of Human Rights Defenders, is an Irish-based human rights organisation founded in Dublin, Ireland in 2001 to protect those who work non-violently to uphold the human rights of others as outlined in the Universal Declaration of Human Rights.

== History ==
The organisation was founded by Mary Lawlor, former director of the Irish Section of Amnesty International with a US$3 million donation from businessman and philanthropist Denis O'Brien. Front Line Defenders has Special Consultative Status with the United Nations Economic and Social Council, and has Observer Status with the African Commission on Human and Peoples' Rights.

The organisation maintains regional representations in countries throughout Africa, Asia, North and South America, and the Middle East. In 2006 Front Line Defenders established a European Union office in Brussels.

By 2007, Front Line Defenders operated 24-hour hotlines in 5 languages for those who felt their rights were being violated anywhere in the world. The organization received the King Baudouin International Development Prize in 2007.

In 2018, the organization was one of four recipients of the United Nations Human Rights Award.

In October 2021, Front Line Defenders found evidence that various Palestinian citizens belonging to human rights groups which had been outlawed by Israel, had been targeted by spyware made by the Israeli technology company, NSO Group.

== Front Line Defenders Award for Human Rights Defenders at Risk ==
In 2005 this award was established, which according to the organisations website is awarded to a human rights defender "who through non-violent work, is courageously making an outstanding contribution to the promotion and protection of the human rights of others, often at great personal risk to themselves". The award brings international attention to its recipient's cause, and a €15,000 cash prize.

- 2005 – Mudawi Ibrahim Adam, Sudan
- 2006 – Ahmadjan Madmarov, Uzbekistan
- 2007 – Gégé Katana, Democratic Republic of Congo
- 2008 – Anwar al-Bunni, Syria
- 2009 – Yuri Melini, Guatemala
- 2010 – Soraya Rahim Sobhrang, Afghanistan
- 2011 – Joint Mobile Group, Russian Federation
- 2012 – Razan Ghazzawi, Syria
- 2013 – Biram Dah Abeid, Mauritania
- 2014 – SAWERA – Society for Appraisal and Women Empowerment in Rural Areas, Pakistan
- 2015 – Guo Feixiong, pen name for Yang Maodong, China
- 2016 – Ana Mirian Romero, Honduras
- 2017 – Emil Kurbedinov, Crimea
- 2018 – Nurcan Baysal, Turkey
- 2019 – Ibu Shinta Ratri, Indonesia
- 2020 – Africa: Mekfoula Mint Brahim, Mauritania; Americas: Guardia Indígena del Cauca, Colombia; Asia: Juwairiya Mohideen, Sri Lanka; Europe & Central Asia: Lara Aharonian, Armenia; Middle East & North Africa: Fatima Al-Bahadly, Iraq
- 2021 – Africa: Aminata Fabba, Sierra Leone; Americas: Camila Moradia, Brazil; Asia: Mother Nature Cambodia, Cambodia; Europe & Central Asia 1: Siarhei Drazdouski & Aleh Hrableuski, Belarus; Europe & Central Asia 2: Mamadou Ba, Portugal; Middle East & North Africa: Sami & Sameeha Huraini, Palestine
- 2022 – Liah Ghazanfar Jawad, Afghanistan; Ameira Osman Hamid, Sudan; Amalgamated Rural Teachers Union of Zimbabwe (ARTUZ), Zimbabwe; Javier del Tránsito and María del Tránsito Salvatierra, Mexico; Volha Harbunova, Belarus
- 2023 - Olivier Bahemuke Ndoole, Democratic Republic of the Congo; Segundo Ordóñez, Ecuador; Jeany 'Rose' Hayahay, Philippines; Digital Security Lab, Ukraine; Hala Ahed, Jordan
- 2024 - Gamito dos Santos Carlos, Mozambique; Muñecas de Arcoíris (Rainbow Dolls), Honduras; Sammi Deen Baloch, Pakistan; Doros Polykarpou, Cyprus; We Are Not Numbers (WANN), Palestine
- 2025 - Luc Agblakou, Benin; The Movement for Human Rights, Peace and Global Justice (MONDHA), Dominican Republic and Haiti; Arnon Nampa, Thailand; Sharifa Madrakhimova, Uzbekistan; Mhamed Hali, Western Sahara
- 2026 - Laurinda Manuel Gouveia, Angola; Adda Vyctoria Caetano, Brazil; Umar Khalid, India; Ljiljana Nešić, Serbia; Ahmadreza Haeri, Iran

== See also ==
- List of human rights organisations
