= Katana Gégé Bukuru =

Congolese women's rights activist

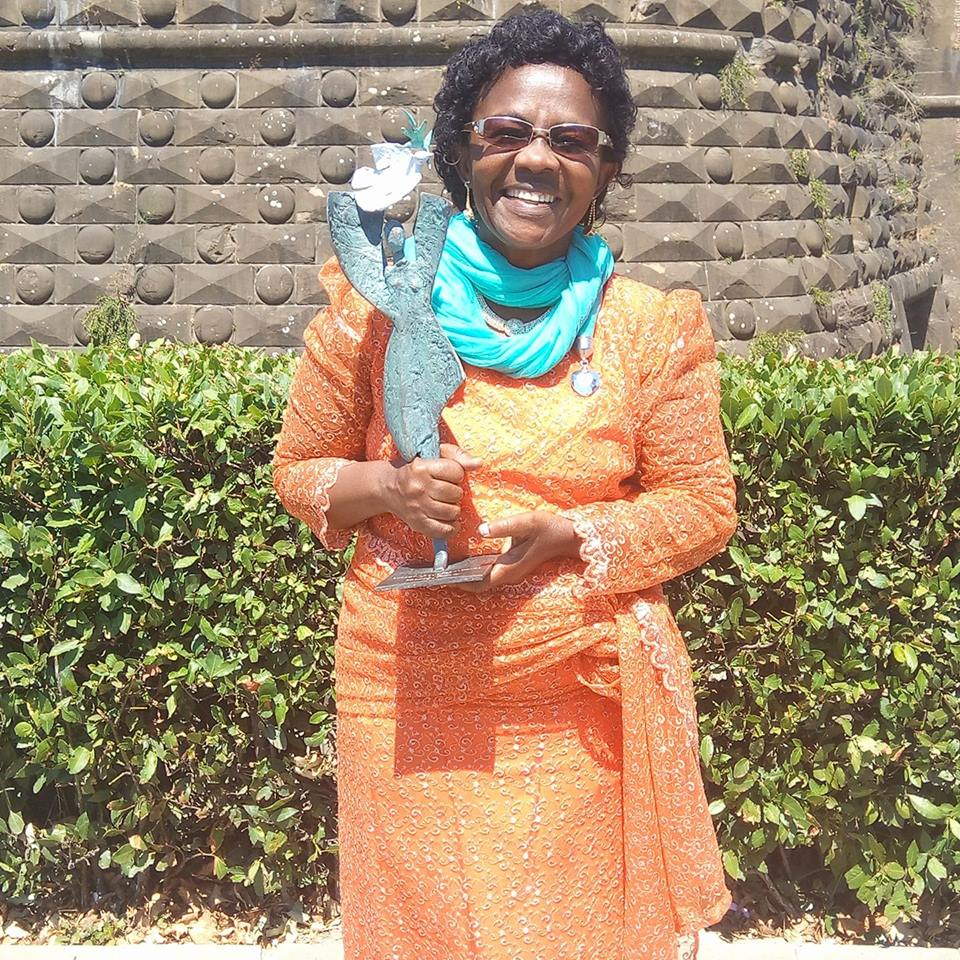
- Born: December 31, 1963 (age 62); Democratic Republic of Congo
- Education: Université Lumière Lyon 2
- Occupation: Activist
- Known for: Founder of SOFAD (Solidarity of women activists for the defense of human rights); "Iron Lady" of the DRC
- Awards: Front Line Defenders award

Katana Gégé Bukuru (born 31 December 1963 in the Democratic Republic of Congo) is a Congolese activist fighting for women rights. She is also the founder of the SOFAD (Solidarity of women activists for the defense of human rights).

Bukuru is known as the "Iron Lady" of the Democratic Republic of Congo (DRC), for her courageous commitment to the struggle for women's rights.

== Biography ==
Eldest daughter of a traditional chief, she studied social sciences at Université Lumière Lyon 2 and carried out research at the Center for Cooperative Training and Research, the Rwanda Association for the Promotion of Integral Development and the Pan-African Institute for Development. She has collaborated with many women's rights movements such as the Rien sans les femmes ("Nothing Without Women") group, the Women's Platform for the Framework Agreement for Peace or the Institute for Adult Development and Education in Africa and Synergy of women's organizations against violence against women in South Kivu.

Katana Gégé Bukuru lives in Uvira, South Kivu, where she founded Solidarité des femmes activistes pour la défense des droits humains (SOFAD) in 2001. The organization brings together more than 600 women fighting for social, economic, and political rights. SOFAD aims to protect the human rights activists and tends to ensure the respect of the rights guaranteed in the Universal Declaration of Human Rights. The association tends to provide help and support to the victims of sexual assault and violence, notably by organizing workshops and trainings for women who are to become leaders in their field.

SOFAD's mission is to train and mobilize women activists, enhance their participation to the protection and promotion of Human Rights, and facilitate the rehabilitation of victims of all forms of violence. The organization also fights against the proliferation of weapons in the Great Lake's region and in East Africa widely.

Her engagement in this fight earns her the support of Amnesty International. The structure works for women's training and encourages them to create "peace cells" within their own neighborhood, conveying rights and hosting women based locally.

On the occasion of the 2018 International Women's Day, she is part of UNESCO France's campaign: "Should one be a man to have a Wikipedia page?", which raises awareness for more gender balance in the digital space.

== Awards ==
For her numerous engagements and battles, she has received several awards. She was the first women to receive the Front Line Defenders award. The prize was created for the human rights defenders at risks.

- Front Line Defenders Prize, 2007
- Per Anger Prize, 2017
- Soroptimist Peace Prize, 2017
