= Small Acts of Freedom =

- First edition
- Author: Gurmehar Kaur
- Language: English
- Genre: Memoir
- Publisher: Penguin Random House
- Publication date: 2018
- Publication place: India
- Media type: Print (paperback, hardback)
- Pages: 234
- ISBN: 9780143442318

Small Acts of Freedom is a 2018 Indian memoir written by activist Gurmehar Kaur and released by Penguin Random House. It tells the story of Kaur whose father had been killed during the Kargil War, and the story of three generations of women in her family including her grandmother Amarjeet, her mother Raji, and Kaur herself. Kaur wrote the books during her final year of college.

== Reception ==
Radhika Santhanam of The Hindu wrote: "It’s a speedy read. The language is simple and straightforward and the writing comes from the heart." Taruni Kumar of Firstpost wrote: "Kaur’s story-telling is simple but taps into a rich vein of emotionality." Rekha Dixit of The Week felt that the book is "written without melodrama, stripped of flourish." She however, felt that some parts were pretentious. A review carried by The Free Press Journal said, "A touching story is one that lingers with you long after you have read it and the book has found a place on the shelf."

Adrija Bose of News18 called it "poignant and leaves you with a lump in your throat once in a while." Further noting that Kaur "manages to beautifully weave together the stories of mothers, wives and daughters of the men in the armed forces." Aditya Sudarshan of Open called it "a self-indulgent book, oriented towards winning the author friends and fans, not towards helping the reader with anything." Meenakshi Reddy Madhavan of The Hindu Business Line said that "you won’t be able to stop thinking about it anyway" and called it an "intensely personal book." John Cheeran of The Times of India called it "a beautiful book, and it can be read at many different levels, it is a book for children; it is a book for women, and it is a book for men; and it is also a book for the bigoted."
