= Dharmender Rana =

Indian judge

- Occupation: Judge

Dharmender Rana is an Indian jurist, and an officer in the Delhi Higher Judicial Service.

== Career and notable cases ==
Currently, Judge Rana is posted as an Additional Sessions Judge in the New Delhi District, Patiala House Court and exercises jurisdiction pertaining to criminal matters. Earlier, he served as an Additional Registrar at the Supreme Court of India, working in the Supreme Court Legal Services Committee, Mediation and Conciliation Project Committee, and Supreme Court Mediation Center.

Judge Rana was in the news, on multiple occasions, when he stayed the death warrants against the Nirbaya convicts. However, after the convicts exhausted all legal remedies he issued the final death warrant that was executed.

In June 2020, he denied bail to Safoora Zargar in the Delhi riots case. Although while hearing the case on another occasion, he had made several observations critical of the manner in which the Delhi Police had investigated the case, remarking the bias and lack of objectivity in the investigation.

In September 2020, after the entire hearing in an INR 8100 crore bank loan fraud case, Judge Rana recused from the case, citing that there were efforts to influence him, and sent it to the district judge for assignment to another judge. The District Judge reassigned the case back to Judge Rana.

Judge Dharmender Rana is working as Principal Registrar at Armed Forces Tribunal on deputation since May 2023.

While passing the bail order in the Disha Ravi case, Judge Rana stated, "The law of sedition is a powerful tool in the hands of the state to maintain peace and order in the society. However, it cannot be invoked to quieten the disquiet under the pretence of muzzling the miscreants." After the Disha Ravi bail order, Judge Rana received threats from social media users.
