= Disappearance of Najeeb Ahmed =

Unsolved 2016 disappearance of Indian student

Najeeb Ahmed
- Born: 1989; India
- Disappeared: 15 October 2016 (age 27); Jawaharlal Nehru University, New Delhi, India
- Status: Missing for 10 years and 21 days (Case closed by CBI. No progress made — 2016-10-15).
- Education: M.Sc (Biotechnology)
- Parents: Nafees Ahmed (father); Fatima Nafees (mother)

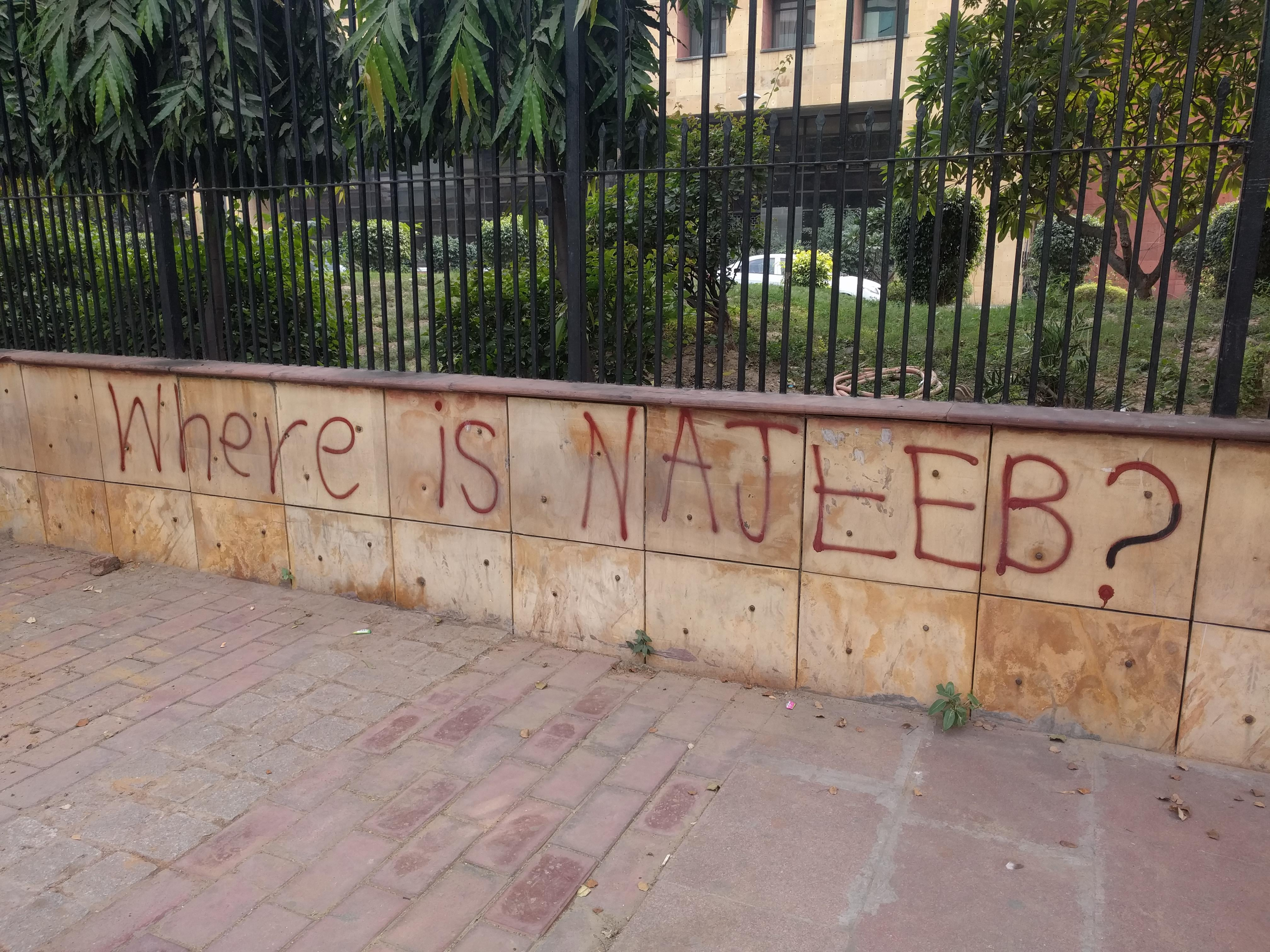
"Where is Najeeb" graffiti in front of the Central Bureau of Investigation headquarters, New Delhi. (The CBI headquarters is on the opposite side of the road, not pictured.)

Najeeb Ahmed was a student of Jawaharlal Nehru University (JNU), New Delhi, India, who went missing from his hostel on the university campus under suspicious circumstances on 15 October 2016.

== Disappearance ==
A native of Badaun, Uttar Pradesh, Najeeb Ahmed was a first year M.Sc. Biotechnology student at JNU, who resided at the Mahi-Mandavi hostel on the university campus for less than a week before he disappeared on 15 October 2016. His family, as well as the JNU Students' Union, have consistently maintained that Ahmed's disappearance was linked to an assault which occurred the previous night. Ahmed was attacked by nine members of the Akhil Bharatiya Vidyarthi Parishad (ABVP) after they had allegedly knocked on his door seeking votes for an upcoming hostel election.

Subsequently, his family demanded that the proper investigative agencies look further into the assault and his disappearance. On 25 November 2016, Ahmed's mother, Fatima Nafees, filed a habeas corpus petition before the Delhi High Court, claiming that the Delhi Police had failed to make any progress in the month after her son's disappearance.

== Investigation ==
The police filed a First Information Report (FIR) for kidnapping and wrongful confinement based on Fatima Nafees's complaint on 15 October 2016. Premier investigative agencies in India, including a Special Investigation Team (SIT) of the Delhi Police, the Crime Branch of the Delhi Police, and the Central Bureau of Investigation (CBI), have been unable to find any leads. All of these agencies were reprimanded by the Delhi High Court at various points for their poorly executed investigation into the case.

After 25 days, the investigation was transferred to the Crime Branch. CCTV footage was found that led the investigators to identify the rickshaw that Ahmed reportedly took from the JNU campus. The mobile phones of the nine ABVP members accused of assaulting Ahmed were sent by the CBI to the forensic science laboratory in Chandigarh and 122 gigabytes of data were extracted from six of the phones. However, the data did not reveal any relevant information.

On 29 June 2017, the CBI announced a reward of 10 lakh rupees (US $13,385.54) for information about Najeeb Ahmed.

In one of their submissions to the Delhi High Court, the CBI accused the Delhi Police of forcing a false statement from an auto driver who said that he had driven Ahmed to Jamia Milia Islamia on the day of his disappearance. The Delhi Police had used this fabricated evidence to pursue a theory that Ahmed had left the campus on his own volition. It had also used Ahmed's medical history to assert that he was mentally disturbed. After being unable to prove any connection between his medical condition and his disappearance, the Delhi Police quietly dropped this line of investigation.

Fatima Nafees issued legal notices to prominent publications including Times of India, Times Now, and Zee News for falsely reporting that her son had connections to the terrorist group ISIS.

In May 2019, the court asked the CBI whether Ahmed is alive or dead, to which the CBI responded that the last time Ahmed was seen was with his friend, and he must have been in hiding. His mother Fatima Nafees opposed the statement and demanded a hearing.

== Role of JNU administration ==
The JNU administration was accused of partisanship and inaction for protecting the 9 students that the JNU student community had accused of assaulting Ahmed. Students blockaded the administration for 20 hours on 23 October 2016 because it had issued circulars calling Ahmed "an accused" which angered students on campus. The administration also issued a 25-point bulletin on Ahmed which did not mention his assault the night before. The JNU Teachers' Association blamed them for being apathetic and showing bias in how the issue was handled. They also criticized the bulletin for 'selectively omitting' the fact that Ahmed was attacked during a brawl a night before. Fatima Nafees also accused the JNU administration of insensitivity.

In June 2017, the JNU Students' Union said that two JNUSU members and two other students (including Umar Khalid) had been fined by the university administration 20,000 rupees each and issued immediate hostel transfer, for seeking justice for Najeeb... "while Najeeb’s assaulters were ‘rewarded’ with just hostel transfers and allowed to roam around on the campus freely, besides continuing to threaten those who witnessed assaults on Najeeb".

== Activism ==
Fatima Nafees has frequently joined activists in protests against the central government and the JNU administration. She joined the JNU Students Union in the Light a Ray of Hope protest in 2016. She addressed a campaign by Jamaat-e-Islami's student organization, SIO, on 22 March 2017 and also inaugurated an exhibition by the SIO in Malappuram in 2018. Fatima Nafees joined Kavitha Lankesh, Professor Apoorva and Shaista Parveen, in a public meeting in Delhi’s Jantar Mantar for the third anniversary of Ahmed's disappearance, joining BSP minister Danish Ali, author Arundhati Roy, Supreme Court advocate Prashant Bhushan, and St. Stephen’s College professor Nandita Narain in 2019. She also joined N Sai Balaji, the National President of All India Students' Association, at JNU on 23 November 2019, then campaigned for Kanhaiya Kumar in Begusarai during the 2019 parliamentary elections. Fatima Nafees joined Nadeem Khan of "United Against Hate" at a press conference on 4 October 2019.

== See also ==
- List of people who disappeared mysteriously (2000–present)
