= Nurcan Baysal =

Kurdish journalist from Turkey

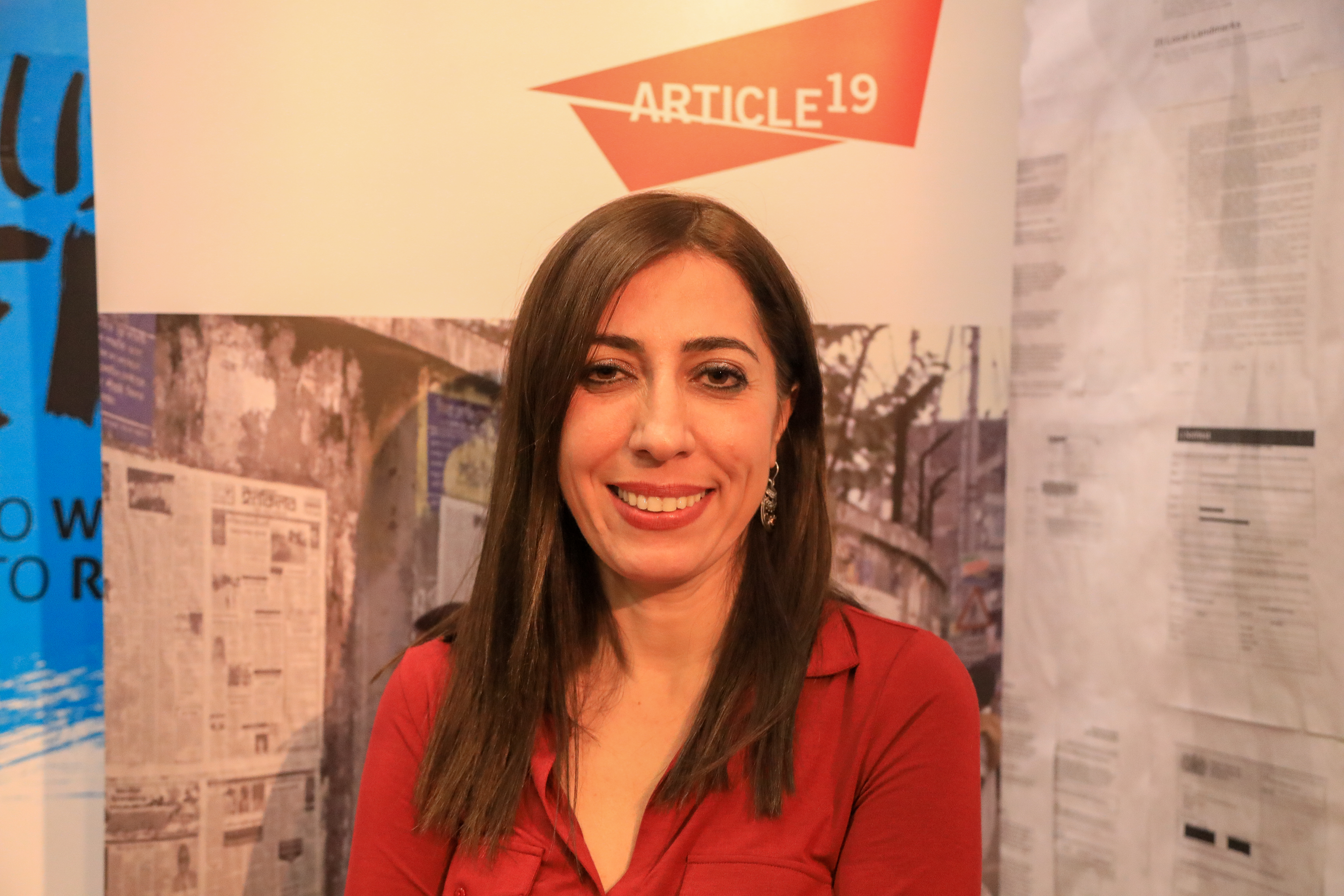
- Nurcan Baysal at a PEN International event in London
- Occupation: Journalist
- Known for: Reporting on human rights violations in South East Turkey

Nurcan Baysal (born 1975) is a Turkish Kurd journalist from Turkey, based in Diyarbakır. In 2018 she was named Global Laureate for Human Rights Defenders at Risk by Front Line Defenders, an Irish human rights NGO.

== Education ==
Baysal studied at the Faculty of Political Science, Ankara University and received a masters degree from Bilkent University International Relations Department.

== Life ==
In 2010 Baysal won the Women's World Summit Foundation (WWSF) prize for Women's Creativity in Rural Life. She received the prize for founding the 'Ozyegin Foundation Rural Livelihoods program', which sought to empower women in the Diyarbakir region. In 2012, Baysal also received a 'Turkey's Changemakers' award for her work on rural development.

Baysal is a founder of the Diyarbakır Institute for Political and Social Research (DISA). Accepting her award from Front Line Defenders, Baysal described a formative moment in her childhood when she witnessed the Turkish military attack a funeral procession for the Kurdish rights activist and head of the Diyarbakir branch of the Turkish Human Rights Association, Vedat Aydın who was tortured and killed in 1991. The award was presented in May 2018 at Dublin Castle by UN deputy high commissioner for human rights Kate Gilmore.

In January 2018, Baysal was detained by Turkish police at her house in Diyarbakir, South East Turkey. Human Rights Watch stated that she was detained in connection with her Tweets criticising Turkey's military operation in Afrin, Syria. She told The Journal that kalashnikov-wielding security forces had stormed her house one evening, saying that "At first we thought it was an earthquake. They were trying to knock down our door." In February, she was found guilty in a separate case of 'demeaning the Turkish security forces' in an article she wrote. Although she was sentenced to ten months in prison, 'she was released on the condition that she not repeat the offence within five years', according to Front Line Defenders.

Baysal worked for the UN Development Programme in Turkey and has published four books in Turkish with İletişim Publishers. She is also a journalist for Turkish news website Ahval. She has also been published by T24 and OpenDemocracy and is a consultant to the Heinrich Böll Foundation.

In June 2019, Baysal was briefly arrested and then released in connection with a meeting of the Democratic Society Congress (DTK) which she had attended in 2012. In October 2019, Baysal's house was raided by 30-40 Turkish police while she was abroad due to her social media posts criticising the Turkish military offensive in Syria.

In 2020, she was arrested for covering the COVID-19 pandemic in Turkey, brought to judged and questioned, but not charged.
