= Gulfisha Fatima =

Indian activist (born 1993)

- Born: 1993 (age 32–33); Delhi
- Education: Delhi University
- Occupations: Activist, Radio personality
- Known for: Student activism
- Notable work: Citizenship Amendment Act protests

Gulfisha Fatima (born 1993) is an Indian student activist from Delhi, known for her involvement in protests against the Citizenship (Amendment) Act, 2019 (CAA) and her advocacy for religious freedom and secularism. She gained significant attention for her role in peaceful demonstrations in Selampur, Delhi, which were part of a larger nationwide CAA Protest, a law criticised for allegedly discriminating against Muslims in India.

== Early life and education ==
Gulfisha Fatima was born into a Muslim family in Delhi. She went to pursue Urdu Honours from Kirori Mal College, Delhi University, and then completed her MBA from Institute of Management Education in Ghaziabad. She was working as a radio jockey before getting arrested in 2020.

== Arrest ==
Fatima was arrested on 9 April 2020, during the protests related to the 2020 Delhi riots, and has since been charged under multiple serious offences, including rioting, conspiracy, and violations of the Unlawful Activities (Prevention) Act (UAPA).

Her arrest has been characterised by many as politically motivated, aimed at suppressing dissent against the government led by the Bharatiya Janata Party (BJP). Despite being granted bail in some cases, she remains incarcerated due to ongoing charges under the UAPA, which has drawn international scrutiny and calls for her release from human rights organisations - the United States Commission on International Religious Freedom.

== Imprisonment without trial ==
Fatima spent Indefinite detention for nearly five years without any trial in a controversial conspiracy case, despite widespread criticism from human rights groups.

Her case is emblematic of broader concerns regarding the treatment of activists and religious minorities in India, particularly in the context of the CAA protests and the subsequent riots in Delhi.

== Bail ==
The Supreme Court of India granted bail to Fatima along with Meeran Haider, Shifa ur Rehman, Mohammad Saleem Khan & Shadab Ahmed on 3 January 2026.

The court observed that prolonged incarceration without the commencement of trial warranted the grant of bail. Following the order, Fatima was released on 7 January 2026, after spending several years in custody.
