= Gabela, Angola =

Gabela
- Commune and town
- Location within Angola
- Coordinates: 10°51′S 14°22′E
- Country: Angola
- Province: Cuanza Sul
- Municipality: Amboim

Area
  - Total: 459 km^{2} (177 sq mi)
- Elevation: 942 m (3,091 ft)

Population (2014)
  - Total: 184,723
  - Density: 402/km^{2} (1,040/sq mi)

Gabela is a town, with a population of 116,903 (2014), and a commune, named Gabela Sede, in the municipality of Amboim, province of Cuanza Sul, Angola and the seat of that municipality. The area of the commune comprises 459 km^{2} with a population of 184,723. It was founded as N'Guebela on September 28, 1907.

Around the town, some areas of the Angolan Scarp savanna and woodlands with its unique plants and animals are still to be found. The Gabela akalat (Sheppardia gabela), a species of bird, was first recorded here by scientists and subsequently named after the town, as were the Gabela helmet-shrike (Prionops gabela) and Gabela bush-shrike (Laniarius amboimensis); these endangered species are only found in the uplands near Gabela.

== Mining and transport ==
Gabela used to have a mine with a 610 mm (2 ft) narrow gauge railway to Porto Amboim.

== Notable residents ==
- Laurinda Manuel Gouveia (born 1989), human rights activist.
