= Jawaharlal Nehru University sedition row =

2016 protest event in Delhi, India

On 9 February 2016, some students of Jawaharlal Nehru University (JNU) held a protest on their campus against the capital punishment meted out to the 2001 Indian Parliament attack convict Afzal Guru, and Kashmiri separatist Maqbool Bhat. The organisers of the event were former members of the Democratic Students' Union (DSU). The event was held despite the university administrations withdrawing permission for the event shortly before it was due to begin, due to protests by members of the student union of ABVP. The event saw clashes between various student groups. A video was circulated by an Indian news channel, Zee News, in which a group of individuals, whom a later university-investigation described as outsiders to the university wearing masks, shouted "anti-India" slogans.

Four days after the event, the then-President of the JNU Students' Union, Kanhaiya Kumar, was arrested by the Delhi Police and charged with sedition. Two other students were arrested soon afterwards, including Umar Khalid. Thousands of students, faculty, and staff protested the arrest at JNU, and classes at the university were stopped for several days. The arrest was also criticized by a number of prominent scholars internationally. Protests against the arrests were held in the University of Delhi, Jadavpur University, Osmania University, Aligarh Muslim University, Panjab University, and the University of Kerala.

Investigations into the incident were carried out by the Delhi government and the university administration. Both found that the controversial slogans had been shouted by outsiders at the university. The arrested students were all granted bail, with the judge noting in one case that there was some evidence of the accused shouting slogans. However, the university inquiry found many students to have violated university rules and enacted sanctions, varying from fines to rustication, on 21 students. In response, twenty-five students went on an indefinite hunger strike. The Delhi High Court suspended the enactment of the university sanctions till their appeals were decided by an appellate authority within six weeks of hearing the students on the condition that they end their strike.

== Background and prelude ==
Jawaharlal Nehru University (JNU) is one of India's highest ranked universities, known as one of the country's best graduate schools in the social sciences. The student union of the university has close ties to India's Communist parties; the university itself has mobilized around several political issues. The administration of the university is answerable to the Union government;

In February 2016, 10 students of the university organised an event protesting the executions of Afzal Guru and Maqbool Bhat, and in support of "the struggle of Kashmiri people for their democratic right to self-determination". The event was planned to be held on 9 February. Afzal Guru was a Kashmiri separatist convicted of participating in the 2001 Parliament attack: his execution in 2013 had drawn criticism for being carried out in secret. Maqbool Bhat, also a Kashmiri separatist, was the co-founder of the Jammu Kashmir Liberation Front, and had been hanged in 1984. The students organizing the event were all former members of the Democratic Students' Union (DSU).

Posters advertising the event had invited people to attend a protest march against the "judicial killing of Afzal Guru and Maqbool Bhatt." The posters also mentioned an exhibition of art and photographs about the history of the occupation of Kashmir, and the struggles of its inhabitants. Members of the Hindu nationalist student union, the Akhil Bharatiya Vidyarthi Parishad (ABVP) protested the event, and wrote a letter to the vice chancellor of the university, asking him to prevent it. The university administration withdrew permission for the event a few hours before it was to be held. The registrar of the university said that the request for permission that had been filed for the event had not mentioned Afzal Guru, and that it had therefore been incomplete. After filing a complaint with the JNU administration, the ABVP leader, Saurabh Kumar Sharma, invited two television channels to cover the event.

At a similar event held the previous year, permission had also been withdrawn shortly before the event; according to the organizers, this was because S. A. R. Geelani, a Kashmiri lecturer at the Delhi University, had been scheduled to speak. Geelani had been accused of involvement in the 2001 attack on the Indian parliament, but had been acquitted due to lack of evidence. The organizers nonetheless held the event. Several students tried to prevent Geelani from attending: stones were thrown at his car, and Geelani himself was manhandled. He was able to attend the event due to JNU students forming a human chain to protect him. Geelani and the organizers stated that the disruptive students were members of the ABVP, which was denied by the ABVP.

== First rally ==
The students held the event despite the withdrawal of permission, citing their freedom of speech. Rather than holding a protest as initially planned, the event involved a cultural programme and an art and photo exhibition. The event was organized near the "Sabarmati Dhaba" on the JNU campus. Towards the end of the event, various student groups clashed, and police forces needed to be called in to restore order. The ABVP issued a call for a protest outside the venue of the event, terming it "anti-national." In response to the ABVP's call, members of other student groups, including the All India Students Association(AISA), the All India Students Federation (AISF), and the Students' Federation of India (SFI), arrived to support the event.

During the "fracas" that ensued, a small group of people raised slogans that were generally described as "anti-India" slogans. They included phrases like "Kashmir ki azadi tak jung chalegi, Bharat ki barbadi tak jung chalegi" ("War will continue till Kashmir's freedom, war will continue till India's demolition"). (Note: These slogans are often chanted by Pakistani jihadist group Lashkar-e-Taiba. Home minister Rajnath Singh linked the JNU protests to Lashkar-e-Taiba.) There was controversy over the identity of the sloganeers. Although initial media reports blamed the organizers and the students of JNU for the slogans, an investigation by the university later stated that the provocative slogans were raised by outsiders. At the end of the event, JNU Student Union president Kanhaiya Kumar gave a speech, in which he stated that he supported freedom of speech, but condemned "any act of violence, terrorism, any terrorist act, or any anti-national activity."

== Immediate reactions and arrests ==
=== Students union responses ===
The organizers of the event distanced themselves from the slogans. Kanhaiya Kumar, the president of the Jawaharlal Nehru University Students' Union (JNUSU), said: "We are appalled at the way the entire incident is being used to malign JNU students. At the outset, we want to condemn the undemocratic slogans that were raised by some people on that day. The slogans were not raised by members of Left organisations or JNU students." JNUSU vice-president Shehla Rashid Shora condemned the slogans, saying; "We condemn the undemocratic slogans that were raised by some people on that day. When the sloganeering had been taking place, it was the Left-progressive organisations and students, including JNUSU office-bearers, who asked the organisers to stop the slogans, which were regressive."

=== ABVP protests and inquiry ===
On 10 February, the Members of the JNU branch of the ABVP, protested at the university, demanding the expulsion of the students who had organized the previous day's event. A day later the ABVP filed an official complaint with the JNU administration, the Ministry of Human Resource Development, and the Delhi Police. The complaint referred to various leftist groups as "terrorists." Union Home Minister Rajnath Singh suggested that the event had been supported by the terrorist group Lashkar-e-Taiba, and tweeted "If anyone shouts anti India slogan & challenges nation's sovereignty & integrity while living in India, they will not be tolerated or spared." He was reported to have reacted following an alert by the Party's Member of Parliament Maheish Girri. The administration of JNU stated that the event had been an act of indiscipline since permission for it had been withdrawn, and announced that it would hold a formal inquiry. The administration said that any talk about country's disintegration cannot be "national".

=== Arrests and criticism ===
Four days after the initial event, the Delhi Police arrested JNUSU president Kanhaiya Kumar on charges of sedition and criminal conspiracy, under section 124 of the Indian Penal Code dating back to 1860. Five other students, Umar Khalid, Anirban Bhattacharya, Rama Naga, Anant Prakash and Ashutosh Kumar, went into hiding after the arrest of Kanhaiya Kumar, and returned 10 days later. Umar Khalid and Anirban Bhattacharya surrendered to the police and were taken into custody. The other three students did not surrender but said that they were open to questioning by police when needed.

The arrest and the use of the sedition law were heavily criticized as being a suppression of political dissent. The law that Kumar was arrested under had been enacted in 1870, and used by the British colonial government to suppress the Indian independence movement; it was upheld only rarely in Indian courts. University teachers criticised the arrest as being an "excessive police action". JNU students formed a human chain, demanding that sedition charges against Kanhaiya Kumar be dropped. Human rights organisation Amnesty International India said Kumar's arrest and the charges against him were "uncalled for" and "India's sedition law contrary to international standards on freedom of expression must be repealed."

== Responses ==
=== Student protests ===
Following the arrest of Kanhaiya Kumar, massive protests broke out among students, staff and faculty at JNU. Thousands of individuals attended the demonstrations. On 14 February 2016, students of the university issued a "shutdown call", and stated that they would not allow further classes to take place until Kumar was released. The rallies were addressed by politicians such as Rahul Gandhi, Sitaram Yechury, and Anand Sharma. Although the protests were largely peaceful, Sharma was assaulted by an unidentified individual, alleged to be a member of the ABVP. In addition to protesting the arrest, the rallies chose to highlight "the unfair treatment of minorities and Muslims in the country". JNUSU Vice-president Shehla Rashid Shora was among the leaders of these protests.

Protests against the arrests in were held in the University of Delhi, Jadavpur University, Osmania University, Aligarh Muslim University, Panjab University, and University of Kerala.

=== Response from Political Parties ===
Several political parties criticized the actions of the government, on the grounds that it was "an attempt by the BJP to push its Hindu nationalist agenda." Indian National Congress vice-president Rahul Gandhi said "It seems only the Bharatiya Janata Party and the Rashtriya Swayamsevak Sangh have the licence to say who is a traitor and who is a patriot". Gandhi visited the JNU campus in solidarity with the protesting students. The general secretary of the Communist Party of India (Marxist), Sitaram Yechury, tweeted "There can be no bigger farce than (Nathuram) Godse-worshippers putting out certificates on nationalism." Along with the Communist Party of India secretary D. Raja and Janata Dal (United) representative K. C. Tyagi and Sitaram Yechury asked Delhi chief minister Arvind Kejriwal to order a probe into the actions of the police. Following the meeting, the Aam Aadmi Party government ordered a magisterial probe. Several political figures attended public meetings held by students at JNU.

Ministers in the BJP government were supportive of the actions of the police. Rajnath Singh said, "Be it JNU or any other institution, anti-India slogans can never be tolerated." The Human Resource Development Minister Smriti Irani stated that the country (could) never tolerate any insult to Mother India. Minister of State Kiren Rijiju said that "Be it JNU or any other institution, anti-India slogans can never be tolerated."

=== Community response ===
Forty senior journalists from around the country, alumni of JNU, condemned the arrests stating that every university should protect dissenting members however unpalatable they may be to the mainstream opinion. They chastised the "government in power" for using the incidents as a ruse to attack a higher education institution and regarded it as a part of the attacks on dissent and freethinking. A group of professors from the Indian Institute of Technology, Bombay said that the state cannot dictate the many meanings of what it means to be "Indian" or mandate the meaning of "nationalism."

Lyricist and film director Gulzar said that he felt he and his country to be safe when he saw youngsters raising their voices in dissent. The BBC and several other commentators called the whole protest movement an "Indian spring" of 2016. Journalist Prem Shankar Jha described the arrests as an "abuse of the law," and stated that they constituted a "re-emergence of a totalitarian threat."

In contrast, an article published by Mohandas Pai argued that university students needed to focus on their academic studies rather than politics. The article garnered substantial support online, although a number of people also disputed the article, making the argument that education involved more than just academic learning.

=== International response ===
More than 500 academics from around the world, including JNU alumni, released a statement in support of the protesting students, stating that the JNU stands for a vital imagination of the space of a university that "embraces critical thinking, democratic dissent, student activism, and the plurality of political beliefs."

In a separate statement, over 130 well-known scholars, including Noam Chomsky, Judith Butler, Orhan Pamuk, Akeel Bilgrami and Sheldon Pollock called it a "shameful act of the Indian government" to invoke sedition laws formulated during colonial times to silence criticism. They also criticized "the culture of authoritarian menace that the present government in India has generated." Students from UC Berkeley, Yale University and University of London showed their solidarity with the protesting students, by narrating Kanhaiya Kumar's "seditious" speech in English, and uploading their videos online.

== Legal and administrative proceedings ==
The day after the initial rally, the university administration ordered a "disciplinary inquiry into the incident." On 12 February, four days after the initial event, Kanhaiya Kumar was arrested and charged with sedition and criminal conspiracy, under section 124 of the Indian Penal Code. Kumar was placed in judicial custody for a period of three days.

Based on the initial investigation report, Kanhaiya Kumar and seven other students were academically debarred. Kanhaiya Kumar was granted six-month interim bail by the Delhi High Court on 2 March 2016. On 11 March, the involved students were allowed to attend their classes again.

=== Patiala House court incidents ===
Kanhaiya Kumar's hearing was scheduled to take place on 15 February, in the Patiala House court. A group of 40 lawyers began shouting slogans against JNU prior to the hearing. The journalists covering the case were assaulted by the lawyers outside the Patiala House court. Students and teachers of JNU who had come to attend the hearing were also beaten by a group of men in lawyer robes, who tried to push them out of the courthouse. Two members of the media were injured in the scuffle. The lawyers also verbally abused the students, referring to them as terrorists. The incident led to a protest by the journalists against the violence that took place.

BJP MLA O. P. Sharma was among those seen beating a man outside the court: Sharma later stated that he had been attacked first. The incident occurred while policemen were present, but they took no action. On the same day, a First Information Report was filed with respect to the violence at the court. The Bar Council of India criticized the attack and said that it would hold in inquiry. The Delhi Court extended Kanhaiya Kumar's judicial custody by two days. Also on 15 February, a petition was filed in the Delhi High Court, seeking a National Investigation Agency probe in the "sedition" case: the petition was dismissed the next day. On 17 February, a second hearing was held in the Patiala House court: this too was disrupted by men wearing lawyer robes. Following this scuffle, Kanhaiya Kumar's judicial custody was extended until 2 March.

=== Supreme Court rulings ===
On 16 February 2016, the Supreme Court of India agreed to hear a plea seeking "free and fair access to justice" to Kanhaiya Kumar, following the acts of violence against journalists, JNU students and lecturers. Two days later on 18 February, Kumar filed a petition in the Supreme Court seeking bail. On the same day, a six-member panel that had been investigating the Patiala House court violence submitted its report to the Supreme Court. The Supreme Court-appointed panel stated that the policemen present at the Court were responsible for the security lapses, and further stating that police allowed 2 persons to enter the court room, and continued to let the assault take place, in direct violation of the SC direction on Kanhaiya's safety. The Supreme Court transferred Kumar's bail plea to the Delhi High Court to ensure his safety. On 22 February 2016, news outlet India Today broadcast a video in which three lawyers of the Patiala House court claimed that they beat Kanhaiya Kumar while he was in police custody.

=== Other arrests and bail ===
Kanhaiya Kumar was granted six months of interim bail by the Delhi High Court on 2 March 2016. Justice Pratibha Rani noted that there were no recordings of Kumar participating in anti-national slogans. Going beyond the immediate issue, the judge also held that the alleged slogans threatened national integrity, and could not be protected as free speech. She characterized them as a form of "infection," which could sometimes be treated, but occasionally needed to be amputated.

Five other students, Umar Khalid, Anirban Bhattacharya, Rama Naga, Anant Prakash and Ashutosh Kumar, had gone hiding after Kumar's arrest on 12 February and returned 10 days later. Umar Khalid and Anirban Bhattacharya surrendered to the police on 23 February and were taken into custody. The other three students did not surrender but said that they were open to questioning by police when needed. Khalid and Bhattacharya were held in Tihar Jail, and released on bail on 17 March. In releasing them, the judge cited the bail previously granted to Kanhaiya Kumar, as well as the fact that both students were educated individuals, with the two being ordered not to leave the city. Umar Khalid stood accused of being one of the main organizers of the event commemorating Afzal Guru.

=== Investigation results ===
A separate magisterial investigation ordered by the Delhi Government did not find any evidence of Kanhaiya Kumar participating in anti-national sloganeering. New Delhi district magistrate Sanjay Kumar stated that doubts had been raised as to whether Pakistan Zindabad slogans had been chanted at the 9 February protest, and questions were raised about whether it had been outsiders from JNU who had shouted anti-Indian slogans. The report was not definitive about the role of Khalid in the protest, with District Magistrate Kumar saying that Khalid's role needed "to be further investigated." Following the submission of the report, Kumar was released on bail, but Khalid remained in custody. Regarding the controversy of fabricated videos, District Magistrate Kumar's probe reviewed seven videos sent for verification, and three were found to have been doctored by having been edited and voices added.

The inquiry committee appointed by the administration of JNU initially asked 21 students to explain their contravention of university rules. Based on the inquiry, the committee meted out varying punishments to a number of students. Kanhaiya Kumar was fined 10,000 rupees, while Umar Khalid and Anirban Bhattacharya were rusticated from the university. A number of other students received fines, rustications, bans from campus, or withdrawals of hostel facilities. The committee found that the provocative slogans at the 9 February event were raised by a group of outsiders, wearing masks. The panel criticized the campus security force for failing to prevent the sloganeering and failing to stop the outsiders from leaving the campus. It also criticized the organizers of the first event for not "acting with due responsibility." The panel stated, "This act by outsiders has brought disrepute to the entire JNU community."

== Aftermath ==
On 3 March 2016, Kanhaiya Kumar gave a speech to a packed auditorium on the JNU campus, in which he said he was seeking, not freedom from India, but freedom within India. He appealed to his fellow students to free the nation from the clutches of the Rashtriya Swayamsevak Sangh, which he said was trying to divide the nation. Referring to the ABVP, whose members were instrumental in bringing about his arrest, he called them his "opposition", not his enemy. He urged his supporters to keep raising the slogans of azadi (freedom).

Following the ruling of the university-appointed committee, the students of JNU who had been punished stated that they would not accept their punishment, and would not vacate their hostels as the university had ordered. On 28 May, 25 students launched an indefinite hunger strike, demanding that their punishment be overturned. Various students withdrew from the strike as it progressed, due to deteriorating health. On 10 May, Khalid and Bhattacharya filed a petition in the Delhi High Court against their sentences. On 12 May, a number of other students, including Kanhaiya Kumar, challenged their punishment in the High Court. The same day, the High Court stayed the punishment meted out to the students until 19 September, on the condition that the students suspend their hunger strike (which had run for 16 days up to that point), and allow the university to function normally.

On 23 August, the appellate authority of JNU, which heard the students' appeal against their sanctions, upheld the ruling of the investigative committee, although a few of the fines were reduced. The students were given a two-week deadline to comply with the order. On 5 September, the Delhi High Court put the order on hold, and postponed a hearing on the matter. In between these two events, Kumar, Khalid, and Bhattacharya were also given regular bail in place of the interim bail they had previously been granted in the sedition case. A few days later, the Delhi High court further postponed the enactment of the university order to 19 October, and in the interim asked for the university's response to the students' petition.

== Debate on fabrication of evidence ==
Zee News reported that some of the students from the Democratic Students' Union (DSU) raised slogans such as "Bharat Ki Barbadi" ("Destruction of India") and "Pakistan Zindabad" ("Long live Pakistan").

The Aam Aadmi Party filed a complaint, alleging that ABVP students had raised "Pakistan Zindabad" slogans. The ABVP admitted that members of their organisation had been present, but shouted "Bharatiya Court Zindabad" and "Indian Army Zindabad," and filed a counter-complaint. The police then declared that "the footage had been tampered with."

Another video, dated 11 February 2016, which showed a speech by Kanhaiya Kumar in which he allegedly made anti-national remarks, was found to have been doctored. India Today stated that in the original video, Kumar was asking for the end of social evils such as caste and communalism, and was not raising any anti-national slogans.

On 14 February 2016, Union Home Minister Rajnath Singh alleged that the JNU incident has the support of the Lashkar-e-Taiba chief Hafiz Saeed. Reports in the media later suggested that this claim had been based on posts by a Twitter account that supposedly belonged to Hafiz Saeed, but turned out to be a fake or parody account.

== Related events ==
During the controversy at JNU, a parallel event commemorating Afzal Guru was organized by the Committee for Release of Political Prisoners at the Press Club of India. The event was moderated by S. A. R. Geelani, a professor at Delhi University, who had been accused but acquitted in the 2001 Parliament bombing case. Several students spoke at the event, discussing the hangings of Guru and Maqbool Bhat, and also narrating personal experiences. After the event, students raised slogans in favour of Kashmiri independence. A few days later, Geelani was arrested and charged with sedition by the Delhi police, and fellow professor Ali Javed, also named as an organizer of the event, was questioned. Geelani was granted bail on 19 March.

A complaint was filed by lawyer Sunkari Janardhan Goud against "Congress vice-president Rahul Gandhi, Delhi Chief Minister Arvind Kejriwal[,] Communist Party of India (Marxist) General Secretary Sitaram Yechury [...] Congress leaders Anand Sharma and Ajay Maken, Communist Party of India leader D. Raja, and Janata Dal (United) spokesperson KC Tyagi." According to Goud, "Gandhi and other leaders visited Jawaharlal Nehru University despite knowing that Kumar had been charged with sedition and supported protesting JNU students."

The branding of JNU students and academics as 'anti-national' continued in March 2016. The Central University of Jharkhand cancelled the visit of former JNU professor M. N. Panini, invited to speak at the Vallabhbhai Patel birth anniversary, alleging that he was a mentor of Kanhaiya Kumar and other student activists. The Vice-Chancellor said that he was flooded with "emails, SMS-es and calls" demanding the cancellation as well as objections raised by the State Governor Draupadi Murmu. The Vice-Chancellor also suspended the Jharkhand Dean who invited Panini to the event, stating that the invitation did not have his permission.

In the elections for the students' unions of the JNU as well as Delhi University in September 2016, the right-wing student union ABVP finished with the worst-ever performance. A leftist student alliance won all the positions. Commentators attributed this result partly to a reaction against the attempt to portray JNU students as "anti-national" during the 2016 protests, which was seen as being part of an attempt by the government of Narendra Modi to impose its Hindu-nationalist ideology on the university.

== See also ==
- Anti-Pollock petition
- May 1968 events in France — student unrest
- 2020 JNU Attack
