= Ishrat Jahan (lawyer) =

Indian politician

- Occupation: Lawyer
- Known for: Former politician, UAPA case
- Political party: Indian National Congress
- Movement: Citizenship Amendment Act protests

Ishrat Jahan is an Indian practising advocate and former municipal councillor for the Indian National Congress in Delhi.

== Biography ==
Jahan has been a practising advocate with the Bar Council of Delhi since 2006. She was elected a councillor for Jagatpuri (an urban ward in Krishna Nagar, Delhi) under the Indian National Congress ticket in 2012.

Ishrat Jahan was a prominent activist in the Citizenship Amendment Act protests that began on 13 January 2020. She was arrested on 26 February 2020 along with two other activists on a variety of charges. Lawyers from the Indian Civil Liberties Union and the Human Rights Law Network who went to the police station to seek their release were allegedly beaten by police. After Jahan was granted bail on 21 March 2020, she was arrested again the same day on charges related to the Unlawful Activities (Prevention) Act (UAPA).

Ishrat Jahan was accused of giving provocative speeches leading up to the violence that rocked northeast Delhi in February 2020 during the Citizenship Amendment Act protests. In May 2020, she was granted ten days bail to get married in June 2020. Ishrat married Farhan Hashmi on 12 June 2020. Thereafter, she was denied interim bail and returned to jail on 19 June. On 31 July 2020, her appeal to the Delhi High Court against a trial court order granting the police more time to file a chargesheet was denied. She was again denied bail on 27 November 2020.

She was lodged at the Mandoli jail until March 2022, where she complained of being harassed on a regular basis and beaten by the inmates in at least two incidents (in November and December 2020). A district court judge noted that Jahan was in a state of "utter fear" and directed jail authorities to provide security to her.

On 14 March 2022, Jahan was granted bail in all pending cases against her. After she was released, she continued to assert that she has been wrongly accused and that the anti-CAA protests were not linked to violence.
