= Nadeem Khan (activist) =

Indian human rights activist

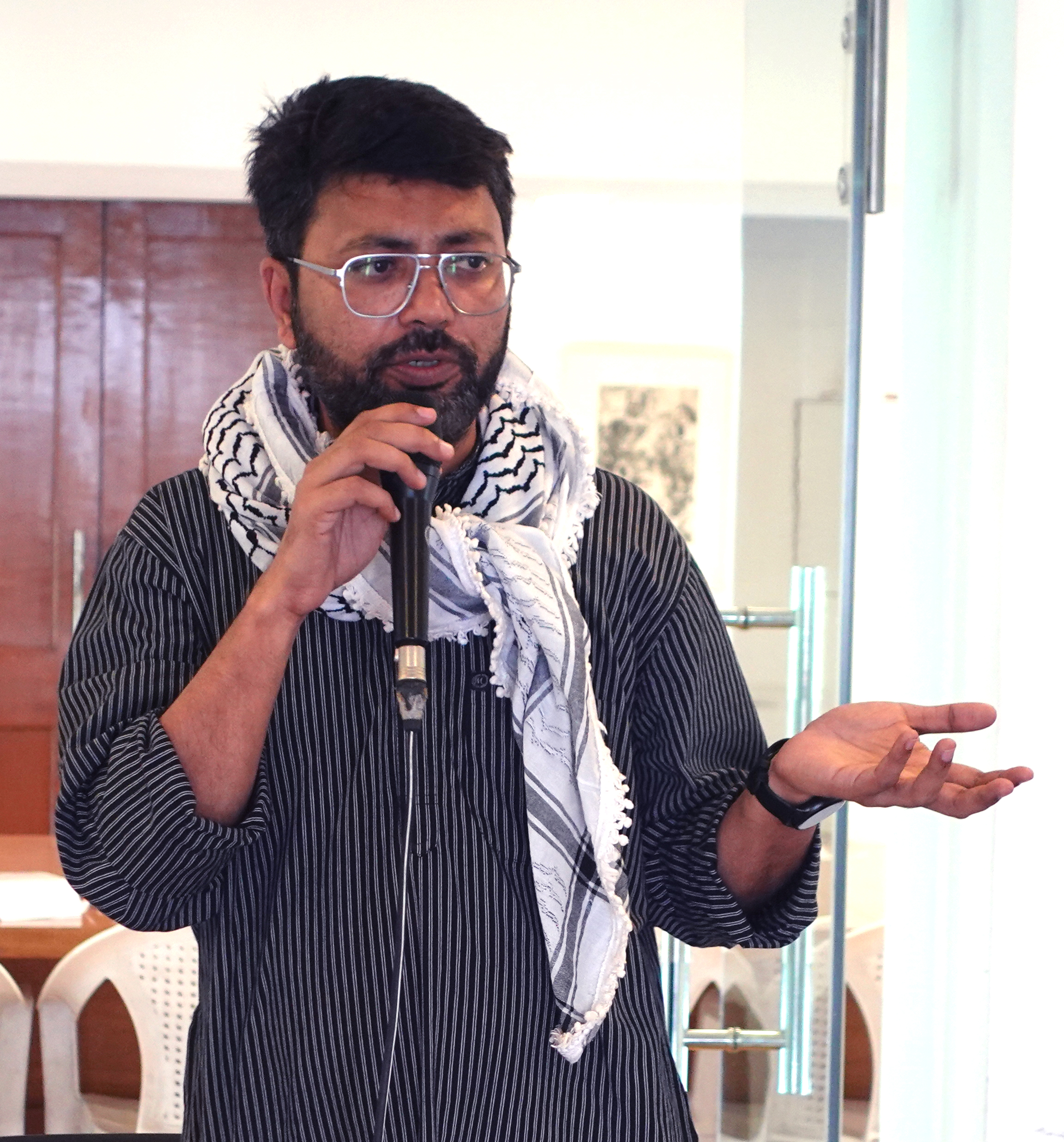
- Khan in 2023

National Secretary of the APCR
- Incumbent
- Assumed office 2021

Founder of United Against Hate.
- Incumbent
- Assumed office 2019

Personal details
- Born: Mohammad Wasiq Nadeem Khan; December 15, 1977 (age 48) Fatehpur, Uttar Pradesh
- Education: MBA
- Occupation: Human Rights Activist

Nadeem Khan (born Mohammad Wasiq Nadeem Khan; December 15, 1977) is a human rights activist in India serving as the National Secretary of Association for Protection of Civil Rights and Founder of UAH (United Against Hate), actively contributing to its cause. His activism extends various communal violence incidents across India including the Bihar Communal Violence, Ram Navami Violence, and Kasganj violence of 2018. He also aligned the victims with others for sponsorship.

== Early life and education ==
Khan was born in Fatehpur, Uttar Pradesh. He received his primary education in his hometown. Khan's father Mohammad Wasim Khan was a farmer.

== United Against Hate ==
United Against Hate (UAH) is an India-based civil rights campaign against hate crime & mob violence; the campaign is run by students, lawyers and intellectuals. Launched in July 2017 in response to a surge in hate crimes and mob lynchings targeting marginalized communities, it has been founded by activists, journalists, and concerned citizens. UAH works to document incidents of communal violence, provide legal and financial aid to victims, and mobilize grassroots resistance against systemic discrimination. The campaign has played a crucial role in organizing protests, fact-finding missions, and public awareness drives against divisive policies, including the Citizenship Amendment Act (CAA) and the National Register of Citizens (NRC). With a commitment to justice and pluralism, United Against Hate continues to be a powerful voice against religious intolerance and state repression in India.

== Justice for Najeeb movement ==
After the disappearance of Najeeb Ahmed, a Muslim student from JNU, Khan with other activists demonstrated several times at the CBI Headquarters and Jantar Mantar led by Najeeb's mother Fatima Nafees to take the matter of Najeeb's disappearance seriously in view of the police inaction. Apart from this, Khan had also launched a signature campaign in Najeeb's case.

== CAA protests ==
Khan played an important role in documenting the consequences of the Citizenship Amendment Act (CAA) in Assam by releasing the first comprehensive report in 2018. The report focused on 14 districts of Assam affected by NRC and was released in various Indian states including Telangana. He released a second report recognizing the flaws in Foreign Tribunals in the context of Assam’s NRC in 2019- highlighting loopholes.

Khan emerged as a community leader during anti-CAA protests, offering guidance and support for the peaceful movement. His activism extends to all prominent cases of the Delhi riots where he actively engaged with victims and advocated for at least 350 cases. Nadeem Khan has continuously raised his voice to uphold human rights through his activism such as in Jahangirpuri, Himmat Nagar, Khargone, Ranchi, and recently in Haldwani and others.

== Awards ==
- JanMitra Samman by People's Vigilance Committee on Human Rights (PVCHR).
- National Muslim Social Leadership Award for Civil Liberties by Movement for Empowerment of Muslim Indians (2019).
- Voice of People Award by Pal Pal News.
