= Umar Khalid =

Indian student activist (born 1987)

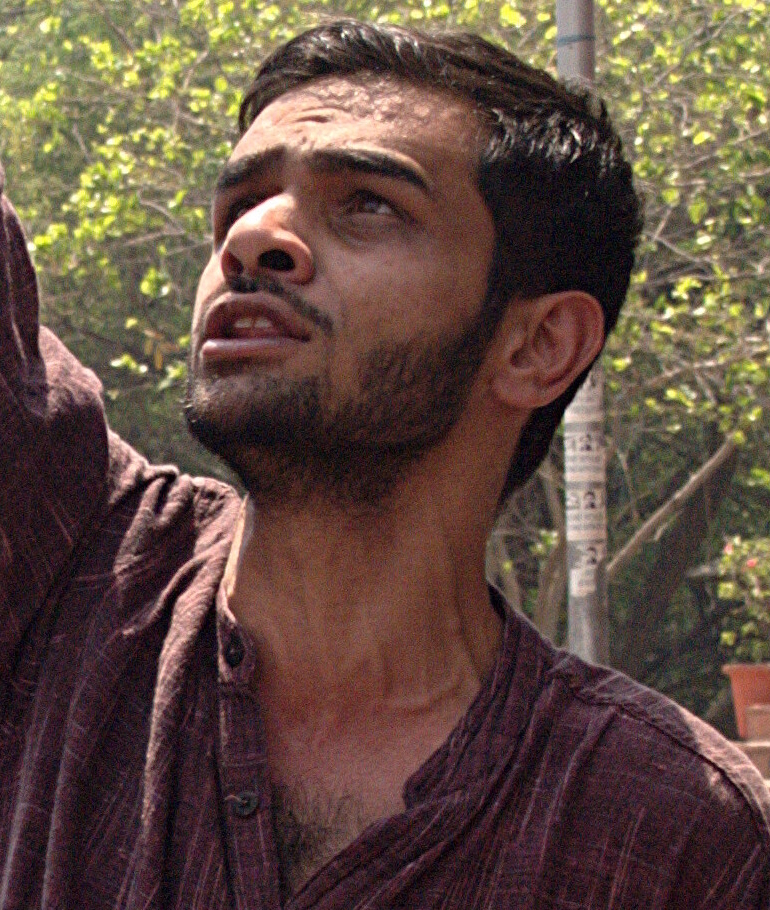
- Khalid during May Day in 2016
- Born: 11 August 1987 (age 39); Delhi, India
- Education: Delhi University (BA); Jawaharlal Nehru University (MA, MPhil, PhD)
- Years active: 2016–present
- Known for: Citizenship Amendment Act protests
- Movement: Justice for Najeeb Movement
- Father: S. Q. R. Ilyas

Syed Umar Khalid (born 11 August 1987) is a former student leader and research scholar at the Jawaharlal Nehru University. He rose to prominence when the Delhi Police detained him in 2016 over the JNU sedition row. In 2017, he started the United Against Hate campaign with Nadeem Khan and others, in response to a series of hate crimes in north Indian states. In 2018, a cow vigilante group attempted to assassinate him. Between the winter of 2019 and 2020, he participated in nationwide protests against the Citizenship Amendment Act.

Khalid has been detained several times. In February 2016, he was arrested by the Delhi Police for his alleged involvement in the JNU sedition row, in which anti-India slogans were allegedly raised by unidentified individuals following a protest organized against the capital punishment execution of the 2001 Indian Parliament attack convict Afzal Guru. Pro-BJP news channels aired several videos as evidence, which were later identified as doctored. He was subsequently released on bail. Khalid was re-arrested in September 2020 for his alleged involvement in a "larger conspiracy" in the 2020 Delhi riots. According to legal commentators, the police evidence against him is weak and inconsistent.

He has since been held in Tihar Jail and has repeatedly been denied bail, while his trial has yet to begin. In January 2026, the Supreme Court of India acknowledged the delay in the trial but denied him bail, citing the seriousness of the charges.

== Early life and education ==
Umar Khalid was born in Jamia Nagar, New Delhi. His father, Syed Qasim Rasool Ilyas, is from Maharashtra, while his mother is from Western Uttar Pradesh. S. Q. R. Ilyas is the National President of the Welfare Party of India. He was formerly a member of the Students Islamic Movement of India (SIMI), an extremist Islamic student organization, which he left in 1985. SIMI was later banned in 2001.

Khalid studied history at the Kirori Mal College of Delhi University. He earned his master's and MPhil in history at Jawaharlal Nehru University (JNU). His MPhil dissertation was on 'Hos of Singhbhum'. Khalid describes himself as a radical democrat and not a practising Muslim. He met his longtime partner Banojyotsna Lahiri in 2008 and began dating five years later.

Khalid's 2018 doctoral dissertation at JNU focused on the transformation of Adivasi society in Singhbhum under British rule. According to Ramachandra Guha, "it was one of the most accomplished doctoral dissertations by an Indian" he had read. Following his PhD, Khalid published a research article titled "Changing Village Authority in an Adivasi Hinterland: State, Community and Contingencies of Rule in Singhbhum, 1830–1897" in the journal Social Scientist in 2018. He has published several essays on The Caravan and The Telegraph. In February 2026, an anthology titled "Umar Khalid and His World" was published.

== Activism and controversies ==
=== JNU sedition row ===
On 9 February 2016, students of JNU held a protest on their campus against the capital punishment meted out to the 2001 Indian Parliament attack convict Afzal Guru and Kashmiri separatist Maqbool Bhat. As per DM report, pro-Kashmir independence slogans were raised by elements in the crowd. A forensic probe found two of seven videos to be "manipulated".

Four days after the event, Delhi Police arrested JNU Students Union (JNUSU) president Kanhaiya Kumar on charges of sedition and criminal conspiracy. Five other students including Khalid went into hiding. After their return 10 days later, Khalid and Anirban Bhattacharya were taken into custody.

The arrest and the use of sedition charges were widely criticized as suppression of political dissent. An inquiry committee appointed by the administration of JNU meted out varying punishments to a number of students. Kanhaiya Kumar was fined 10,000 rupees while Khalid and Bhattacharya were rusticated for one semester. JNU refused to allow Umar Khalid to submit his PhD thesis in July 2018. Khalid went to the Delhi High Court, and obtained an order allowing him to submit his thesis. On 2 August 2018, JNU accepted the PhD thesis submission.

On 28 February 2020, the Delhi government gave its approval for a trial in the sedition case.

=== Justice for Najeeb movement ===
Umar Khalid was active in the student protests which followed the suspicious disappearance of Najeeb Ahmed from his JNU hostel on 15 October 2016 after he was allegedly assaulted by students affiliated to the Akhil Bharatiya Vidyarthi Parishad (ABVP). Speaking to The Hindu, Khalid said the administration had not filed a police complaint regarding the incident (and only the family and students had) and have not taken action against those who attacked Najeeb. In June 2017, he was fined by the university administration along with three other students for 20,000 rupees each and was issued immediate hostel transfer.

On 15 October 2019, United Against Hate (a campaign group) organised a protest march at Jantar Mantar, New Delhi to mark three years of the disappearance of Najeeb. Khalid expressed his solidarity and joined the march alleging that the fact that investigative agencies including the CBI have not made any progress showed that there have been no efforts to find Najeeb, while his attackers were being protected.

=== Views on Burhan Wani ===
Umar Khalid compared Burhan Wani, leader of the of Hizbul Mujahideen, a designated Islamist terrorist organization of the Kashmir conflict to Che Guevara. In an online post he wrote, "I don’t care if I fall as long as someone else picks up my gun and keeps on shooting. These were the words of Che Guevara, but could have just been Burhan Wani’s too." He went on to praise Wani for his courage and hailed him as a martyr. The incident received criticism from ABVP, a student organization affiliated with RSS.

=== Bhima Koregaon incident ===
Along with Jignesh Mevani, Umar Khalid was booked for giving 'provocative' speeches in Pune. The criminal charges against Mevani and Khalid was for promoting enmity between different groups through their speeches. The Elgar Parishad rally, where this reportedly happened, was held in Pune to mark the 200th year of the Battle of Koregaon, a place in present-day Pune district, which was fought between the then British Indian Army and the Peshwas.

=== Assassination attempt ===
On 13 August 2018, Khalid survived an assassination attempt outside the Constitution Club, near the parliament. Police arrested the two accused on 20 August 2018 from Fatehabad, Haryana. Before the arrest, they had uploaded a video on Facebook on 15 August, saying the attack was an Independence Day gift for India. They claimed they were cow vigilantes.

== 2020 incarceration and Delhi riots ==
Umar Khalid was booked under UAPA by Delhi Police for his alleged "provocative speeches" during the visit of American President Donald Trump to India. Delhi police considered his speeches as instigating and facilitating the 2020 Delhi riots, wherein Hindu mobs violently attacked Muslim communities. On 14 September 2020, Khalid was arrested by the Delhi Police Special Cell as an alleged conspirator in the Delhi Riots case.

In charge sheets related to the riots, the police alleged that Khalid met councillor Tahir Hussain and activist Khalid Saifi at the Shaheen Bagh protest against the CAA and NRC on 8 January. The police has alleged that the three men planned the Delhi riots. Khalid was interrogated twice for his alleged role. The police also linked Khalid's speeches to the riots. The Delhi Police's special cell is looking into a larger conspiracy case in addition to multiple cases filed in connection with the riots.

Delhi Police filed a supplementary charge sheet against Umar Khalid in connection with the Delhi riots. They alleged a case of a multi-layered conspiracy and planning of a riot, and claimed that there was sufficient evidence to proceed against Khalid. In early January 2021, a Delhi court agreed with the chargesheet. Khalid filed a bail plea in July 2021, after eight month long hearing his bail application was dismissed. In the bail order the court said that the allegations against Khalid are prima facie true and his role in the "context of conspiracy" related to Delhi riots was apparent. In March 2022, the court denied bail to Khalid. An Additional Sessions Judge Amitabh Rawat stated that Khalid's plea had "no merit and substance" for the bail to be granted.

On 13 September 2022, as he completed two years in Tihar Jail under the Unlawful Activities (Prevention) Act or UAPA, accused by the Delhi Police of involvement in 2020 Delhi riots, The Wire published Khalid's response to an open letter. By employing UAPA, he says, "we can be kept in jail for years, without those framing us needing to prove anything".

On 18 October 2022, the Delhi High Court dismissed the bail plea of Khalid, as Delhi Police opposed it.

On 3 December 2022, a Delhi court acquitted him in stone pelting case during Delhi riots.

=== Supreme Court bail hearings ===
Khalid's bail petition first made it to the Supreme Court of India in May 2023. On 18 May, Justices Bopanna and Hima Kohli of the SC had issued notice and posted the case after six weeks. On 12 July, Justices Bopanna and M. M. Sundresh listed the case for 24 July. The case came up for hearing on 24 July before Justices Bopanna and Bela M. Trivedi.

The bail hearing came up next in the Supreme Court on 9 August 2023 when Justice Mishra recused himself and the bail hearing was scheduled for 17 August.

It was listed again before the same judge on 17 August and then it was dropped from the Supreme Court case list.

On 14 February 2024, Khalid withdrew his bail plea in the Supreme Court, submitting through his lawyer Kapil Sibal that “he will try his luck” at a lower court, citing a “change in circumstances”. Without elaborating on the “change in circumstance”, Khalid's father cited the long adjournments in the bail plea. At the time, he had completed 1248 days in incarceration.

As of October 2024, Khalid had been jailed for four years without a trial, prompting the New York Times to describe him as "a symbol of the wide-ranging suppression of dissent under Prime Minister Narendra Modi." On 18 December 2024, Khalid was granted a 7-day interim bail for attending a family wedding.

In January 2026, Eight US Lawmakers wrote to Indian ambassador, Vinay Mohan Kwatra, demanding Khalid be granted bail and ensuring a free trial as per international norms.

On 5 January 2026, the Supreme Court of India's two-judge bench rejected the bail plea of Khalid, while granting conditional bail to five other co-accused. The judges drew a distinction between the latter's alleged role and those ascribed to Umar Khalid and Sharjeel Imam. They held that the allegations against the five co-accused were "limited" and "ancillary" in nature, whereas Khalid and Imam faced allegations of a “larger conspiracy” behind the riots in New Delhi. They cited the gravity of the allegations and the “central” role attributed to them by the prosecution. On the following Saturday, New York City's newly elected Mayor Zohran Mamdani wrote a letter to Khalid in solidarity, saying, “We are all thinking of you.”

== Comments ==
In an October 2016 address, Khalid stated both India and Pakistan have “betrayed the people of Kashmir.”

He also called out geopolitical double standards, stating

If someone born in Pakistan stands with Kashmir but is silent on Balochistan it is hypocrisy.

He said the same applies if a Chinese person stands with Kashmir but remains silent on Tibet.

In his Amaravati speech, he called for non-violent protests, saying,

"We won’t respond to violence with violence... If they spread hate, we will respond to it with love."

Criticizing the RSS and Hindu Mahasabha, he said,

When your ancestors were acting as dalals (agents or colloquially pimp) for the British, students and teachers of Jamia Millia Islamia were fighting the British government.

== Recognition ==
In October 2026, Khalid was named as the Asia and the Pacific recipient of the 2026 Front Line Defenders Award, in recognition of his "peaceful and democratic" civil movement against anti-Muslim sentiments in India. Other laureates included Laurinda Manuel Gouveia and Ljiljana Nešić.
