= BK-16 =

16 Bhima Koregaon violence accused

BK-16 refers to a group of sixteen human rights defenders, activists, lawyers, scholars, and artists who were arrested and imprisoned by Indian authorities in connection with the 2018 Bhima Koregaon violence. The individuals were charged under the Unlawful Activities (Prevention) Act (UAPA), an anti-terror law, for their alleged involvement in inciting violence at Bhima Koregaon in 2018 and for conspiring against the government.

== Background ==
The 200th anniversary of the Battle of Bhima Koregaon was commemorated on 1 January 2018. The site is a place of historical significance for Dalits, celebrating a victory of a Mahar regiment over the Peshwa army. Police alleged that speeches and performances at the Elgar Parishad, a rally held in Pune on 31 December 2017, incited violence that erupted the following day near the war memorial.

Authorities claimed the accused were active members of the banned Communist Party of India (Maoist) and were involved in a plot to assassinate the prime minister of India, Narendra Modi.

== The accused ==
The sixteen individuals, collectively known as the "BK-16", come from diverse professional backgrounds including academia, law, journalism, and the arts. They are known for their work with marginalized communities, including Adivasis, Dalits, and Muslims. The individuals are:

- Sudhir Dhawale: An activist and publisher of the Marathi magazine Vidrohi, which focused on caste, land, and labour issues.
- Mahesh Raut: An activist focused on land and forest rights for indigenous communities.
- Shoma Sen: A professor of English literature at Nagpur University and an advocate for women's rights.
- Surendra Gadling: A human rights lawyer known for handling cases related to extrajudicial killings and police misconduct.
- Rona Wilson: A prisoners' rights activist.
- Arun Ferreira: A lawyer and human rights activist.
- Vernon Gonsalves: A trade unionist and writer who has written on the rights of prisoners and Adivasis.
- Sudha Bharadwaj: A trade unionist and human rights lawyer who has worked in Chhattisgarh for three decades.
- Varavara Rao: A prominent poet and activist.
- Gautam Navlakha: A journalist and civil rights activist associated with the People's Union for Democratic Rights.
- Anand Teltumbde: A scholar, management professor, and Dalit intellectual.
- Hany Babu: An associate professor of linguistics at Delhi University.
- Sagar Gorkhe, Ramesh Gaichor, and Jyoti Jagtap: Members of the Kabir Kala Manch, a cultural troupe known for protest music and plays against casteism.
- Stan Swamy: A Jesuit priest and tribal rights activist.

== Digital evidence controversy ==
The evidence used to incarcerate the BK-16 has been the subject of significant scrutiny. In her book The Incarcerations: BK-16 and the Search for Democracy in India, anthropologist Alpa Shah highlights cyber-forensic findings suggesting that electronic evidence was planted on the devices of the accused. Reports by Arsenal Consulting, a US-based digital forensics firm, indicated that the computers of Rona Wilson, Surendra Gadling, and Stan Swamy were compromised by malware. This malware was allegedly used to remotely plant incriminating documents, including letters that formed the basis of the prosecution's case. Shah cites research alleging the existence of a "hacker-for-hire" gang with infrastructure in India and links to police officials involved in the investigation.

== Status of the accused ==
As of 2024, the status of the BK-16 varies, with some released on bail while others remain incarcerated without trial.

- Stan Swamy: The 84-year-old priest died in judicial custody on 5 July 2021. He suffered from Parkinson's disease and contracted COVID-19 while in prison.
- Varavara Rao: Was granted bail on medical grounds.
- Anand Teltumbde: Was granted bail on the merits of the case.
- Others: As of late 2022, Amnesty International reported that activists such as Sudha Bharadwaj had been granted bail, while others including Hany Babu, Sagar Gorkhe, and Sudhir Dhawale remained in jail.
