= Shaniwarwada Elgar Parishad =

Event held at Pune, India

The Elgaar Parishad was an event held on 31 December 2017 to commemorate the two hundredth anniversary of the Battle of Koregaon Bhima. It was organised by a coalition of 260 non-profit organisations at Pune's Shaniwar Wada Fort, and had approximately 35,000 people in attendance. The program consisted of a number of cultural performances, speeches and slogans.

"Elgaar" means loud invitation or loud declaration.

== Background ==
The event was organised at the Shaniwarwada Fort in Pune on the eve of the bicentennial anniversary of the Battle of Bhima Koregaon. The Shaniwarwada Fort was the seat of power of the Peshwas, the de facto rulers of the Maratha Empire. The Peshwas belonged to the 'Chitpavan Brahmin' community. In the Battle of Bhima Koregaon, a regiment of Mahar Dalits, serving in the British Army had defeated the Peshwa's army. This victory is held as very important by the Mahar Dalits, who see it as a victory over the Brahmin Peshwas. Organising the Parishad at the Shaniwarwada Fort was thus seen as a symbol of Dalit assertion. However Anand Teltumbde has argued that painting the Battle of Bhima Koregaon as the battle of Mahars against their caste oppression in Peshwa rule, is a "pure myth". He states that the majority of those died in the battle (27 out of 49) were not Mahars, and the Peshwa army retreated, fearing the arrival of a larger British force. Thus he regards portrayal of the battle as Mahars’ against the Peshwas’ Brahmanic rule as misleading.

Before the event, two marches were organised through several districts of Maharashtra and culminating in Pune with artists, activists, theatre performers and musicians among others. These marches held public meetings to rally support for Dalit victims of atrocities and collect donations for the Elgar Parishad.

== Event ==
The event began at 2 PM under six tents pitched in front of the Shaniwarwada Fort. After the tents filled up at 2.30, police refused to let more people in, fearing stampede. The stage seated the organisers and speakers of the event, including Gujarat MLA Jignesh Mevani, Dalit activist Radhika Vemula, Adivasi activist Soni Sori, Vanchit Bahujan Aaghadi leader Prakash Ambedkar, Bhim Army President Vinay Ratan Singh, retired Bombay High Court Justice BG Kholse-Patil, and student leader Umar Khalid.

A number of cultural performances with anti-caste themes were staged. Shahirs performed songs in tribute of Sant Tukaram, Mahatma Jyotirao Phule, Chhatrapati Shivaji Maharaj and Chhatrapati Shahu Maharaj. A dance troupe performed acrobatics and hip-hop groups also performed. Before Radhika Vemula made her speech, she was invited to smash a stack of pots signifying the varna system in a symbolic gesture of annihilating caste.

== Aftermath ==
On 1 January 2018, violence broke out at Bhima Koregaon, where lakhs of Hindu Dalits minorities like Buddhist had converged to commemorate the battle. One person was killed, and three others injured.

In the months following the event, a number of people present at the event were arrested under laws such as the Unlawful Activities (Prevention) Act (UAPA). This included Surendra Gadling, Rona Wilson, Mahesh Raut, Sudhir Dhawale, Shoma Sen and Stan Swamy. Pune Police alleged that the event was sponsored by Maoists. An FIR was filed against Jignesh Mevani for promoting enmity on grounds of religion.

It was alleged by the Pune Police that the event was organised by members of the banned Communist Party of India (Maoist). They said that it instigated violence at Bhima Koregaon. However, Justices BG Kolse-Patil and PB Sawant refuted their claims. The Justices said that it was the two of them who were the main organisers and sole funders of the event, and that they had held a similar event against communalism and Hindutva in October 2015 at the same venue.
