= Koregaon (disambiguation) =

Koregaon may refer to any of the following places in Maharashtra, India:

- Koregaon, a town in Satara district
  - Koregaon Taluka
  - Koregaon (Vidhan Sabha constituency)
- Koregaon Bhima, a village in Pune district, located on the banks of Bhima river
  - Battle of Koregaon, fought in 1818 at Koregaon Bhima
- Koregaon Park, a locality in Pune
  - Koregaon Park Plaza, a shopping mall in Pune
