= National Platform for the Rights of the Disabled =

Indian disability rights organization

- Formation: February, 2010
- Headquarters: 36, Pt. Ravi Shankar Shukla Lane (Canning Lane) New Delhi – 110001
- General Secretary: Muralidharan Vishwanath
- Website: x.com/NPRD_IN

The National Platform for the Rights of the Disabled (NPRD) is a pan India non-governmental organization, intended to secure democratic and economic p

articipation of persons with disabilities. It was founded in 2010, following a convention attended by disability rights activists.

As of 2026, Muralidharan Vishwanath is the organisation's general secretary.

== History ==
The NPRD was founded by activists and concerned citizens as a pan-disability umbrella organization. The organisation's first convention took place in Kolkata's Salt Lake Stadium in February 2010.

In a 2018 consultation document, the Election Commission of India described the NPRD as “an affiliating body of state level membership based cross disability organisations”. The document stated that it had affiliates in 14 states and approximately 200,000 members across its affiliated organisations.

== Activities ==
The NPRD has variously protested lack of accessibility in railways and air travel in India. It has opposed amendments to provisions of the Rights of Persons with Disabilities Act that would have decriminalised certain offences, it has also opposed discriminatory assumptions concerning the capacity of disabled people to perform professional occupations.

NPRD has called for simplifying the process of disability certifications enabling beneficiaries to avail government benefits swiftly.

NPRD has also campaigned against the use of disability-related language as a political insult. In 2020, an NPRD-affiliated organisation filed police complaints against politician Khushbu Sundar following her use of the term "mentally retarded" in a political context and has variously complained to the Election Commission about derogatory references to disability made by political leaders.

During the imprisonment of G. N. Saibaba, the NPRD raised concerns about his treatment and access to medical care and appropriate accommodation in prison.

The organisation similarly approached the National Human Rights Commission in 2020 concerning Jesuit priest and tribal-rights activist Stan Swamy, who had Parkinson's disease and was being held in Taloja Central Jail.

NPRD has been involved with demanding larger budgetary allocations for the welfare of persons with disabilities.

== Political and social orientation ==
NPRD chiefly works in the direction of empowering the disabled through rights awareness campaigns, demanding dignified livelihoods and so on. Its advocacy has covered disability legislation as well as broader policies affecting persons with disabilities.
