= Rona Wilson =

Indian activist and academic

Rona Wilson is an activist, researcher and the public relations secretary of the Committee for Release of Political Prisoners (CRPP). He has worked with people accused in terrorism cases, including those booked under the Unlawful Activities (Prevention) Act (UAPA). He is an accused in the 2018 Bhima Koregaon violence. In 2018, while he proposed to pursue a Ph.D. from London, he was arrested and incarcerated at Yerawada Central Jail, Pune. He was granted bail by the Bombay High Court on 9 January 2025 but was released on 24 January 2025 after completing the formalities.

== Personal life ==
Rona Wilson was born in 1972 at Kollam district of Kerala. After completing a graduation in Zoology, he moved to Pondicherry Central University for studying Master of Arts in Political science and International relations. Subsequently in late 1990's he moved to Delhi at the Center for Political Studies, Jawaharlal Nehru University (JNU) to pursue an M. Phil. in political studies.

== Activism ==
Rona Wilson has actively fought for release of many political prisoners. He was at the forefront of the struggle to release SAR Geelani who was initially awarded death sentence in the 2001 Parliament attack case. In 2003, Delhi High Court acquitted Syed Abdul Rahman Geelani from that charge. After this, he formed the Committee for Release of Political Prisoners (CRPP) with Geelani. He had also worked with activists for release of G.N. Saibaba who was convicted in 2017 for connections with Maoists.

== Arrest ==
Rona's house was raided in April 2018 in connection with 2018 Bhima Koregaon violence. At that time, he was preparing a research proposal for a Ph.D. On 6 June 2018, he was arrested from Munirka in Delhi early in the morning by Pune Police along with Sudhir Dhawale, Shoma Sen, Mahesh Raut and Surendra Gadling in a joint operation across India. He was booked under the Unlawful Activities (Prevention) Act (UAPA).

=== Allegations ===
The main allegations against Rona are, Rona Wilson had played a role in organizing Shaniwarwada Elgar Parishad on 31 December 2017, which led to violent clash between Marathas and Dalits on 1 January 2018 at Koregaon Bhima on the occasion of 200th anniversary of Battle of Koregaon. The main organiser Sudhir Dhawale was in touch with Rona Wilson and Surendra Gadling.

- Rona Wilson is associated with banned outfit Communist Party of India (Maoist) and this organisation had funded Elgaar Parishad and the ensuing violence.
- A letter was found in the hard disk of computer used by Rona which had mention about Rajiv Gandhi type assassination plot against Prime Minister of India, Narendra Modi.
- He is a maoist sympathiser and was involved in activities that are meant to destabilize the regime. Pune Police submitted before court that, Rona WIlson had connections with G.N. Saibaba who was convicted for connections with Maoists.

=== Fabrication of Evidence ===
On 30 July 2020, Rona Wilson obtained a cloned copy of his hard disk. The American Bar Association forwarded this to a digital forensic analyst firm named Arsenal Consulting. In February 2021, a report by Arsenal Consulting, the digital forensics firm based out of Massachusetts, said the incriminating evidence against Rona Wilson was placed on his laptop by a yet-to-be-identified attacker using a malware named NetWire. It also said that the laptop was compromised for over 22 months and the malware has also affected storage devices that were connected to the system.

In February 2021, Rona Wilson moved a petition before Bombay High Court to quash proceedings against him in light of findings made by Arsenal Consulting. However National Investigation Agency filed a counter affidavit to it denying the findings of Arsenal Consulting on the basis that the findings has not mentioned the person who is alleged to have framed Rona Wilson. NIA also argued that these findings are not part of charge sheet filed before the court and as per settled position of law documents outside purview of charge sheet cannot be relied.

== See also ==
- Stan Swamy
- Anand Teltumbde
- Varavara Rao
- Gauri Lankesh
