= The Battle of Bhima Koregaon: An Unending Journey =

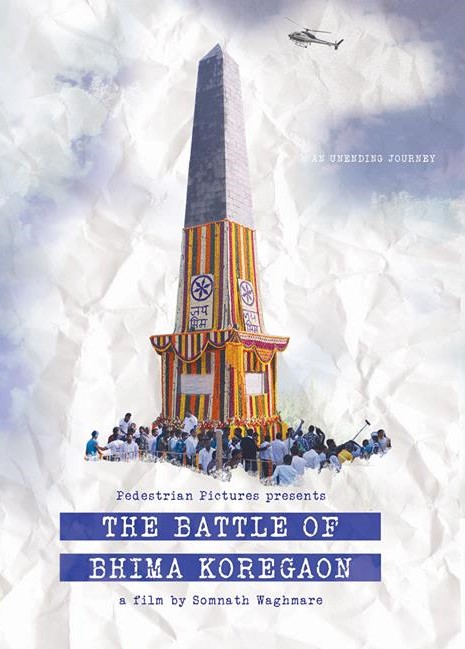
- Directed by: Somnath Waghmare
- Based on: Battle of Koregaon
- Produced by: Pedestrian Pictures
- Starring: Jay Stambh at the Koregaon Bhima
- Cinematography: Abhijit Kambale; Rohan Awaghade; Bhushan Chudhari
- Edited by: Deepu (Pradeep K P)
- Music by: Samata Sainik Dal
- Production company: Pedestrian Pictures
- Release date: 14 April 2017 (Worldwide)
- Running time: 50 minutes
- Country: India
- Language: multiple Indian languages

The Battle of Bhima Koregaon: An Unending Journey is a 2017 documentary by Indian filmmaker Somnath Waghmare. It explored the role of 500 Mahar Dalit soldiers of the East India Company in the Battle of Koregaon on 1 January 1818 against the Maratha Peshwa rulers. It talks about Dalit assertion on 1 January taking place every year. The 50-minute documentary was released in April 2017.

== Production ==
For producing this documentary, Somnath Waghamare used Crowdfunding as he was still a PhD student at Tata Institute of Social Sciences. His topic of M.Phil. research was about caste and its portrayal in Marathi cinema.

== Awards ==
The documentary was screened in first ever Dalit Film and Cultural Festival at Columbia University, New York.

== See also ==
- Battle of Koregaon
