= Vitthalwadi, Shirur =

Village in Maharashtra

Vitthalwadi Vittalwadi
- village
- Location in Maharashtra, India Vitthalwadi (India)
- Coordinates: 18°37′26″N 074°10′22″E
- Country: India
- State: Maharashtra
- District: Pune
- Taluka: Shirur

Population (2001)
  - Total: 2,948

Languages
  - Official: Marathi
- Time zone: UTC+5:30 (IST)
- PIN: 412208

Vitthalwadi is a panchayat village in the state of Maharashtra, India, on the left (north) bank of the Bhima River. Administratively, Vitthalwadi is under Shirur Taluka of Pune District in Maharashtra. There is only the single village of Vitthalwadi in the Vitthalwadi gram panchayat. The village of Vitthalwadi is 6 km by road south of the village of Talegaon Dhamdhere, and 18 km by road east of the town of Koregaon Bhima.

== Demographics ==
In the 2001 census, the village of Vitthalwadi had 2,948 inhabitants, with 1,527 males (51.8%) and 1,421 females (48.2%), for a gender ratio of 931 females per thousand males.
