= Mahagaon =

Mahagaon may refer to:

- Mahagaon, Gadhinglaj, Kolhapur district, Maharashtra, India
- Mahagaon, Mawal, Pune district, Maharashtra, India
- Mahagaon, Yavatmal, Maharashtra, India
