= Betty Kathungu Furet =

Kenyan director and film and documentary producer

Betty Kathungu Furret
- Born: 1977 (age 48–49); Embu County
- Citizenship: Kenyan
- Occupations: Director, film and documentary producer
- Years active: 1995 - till present
- Spouse: Sebastian Furret
- Children: 2
- Parent(s): Cosmas N.E Kathungu; Lillian Wanjagi Kathungu.

Betty Kathungu Furret is a Kenyan director, film and documentary producer and the founder of Furet Films, a film and documentary production company in Kenya.

She has produced films and documentaries such as Castle of Love, One Foot Ahead, Unveiling The Colony, Family Meeting, Wangai's Cross, Medicine Man, Kizingo, Mazagazaga (Mnet), Magerio.

Kizingo, a comic film airing on Showmax won Best feature film and Best Cinematography at the 2017 Riverwood awards.

== Early life ==
She was born in 1977 in Embu County to her parents Cosmas N.E Kathungu Lillian Wanjagi Kathungu. She is married to Sebastian Furret and they have two children; Morris Munene Kathungu Alexia Mukami Furet.

== Education ==
St. Michael’s Primary School in Embu Town Class 1-4 (1983-1986)

Sacred Heart Kyeni Boarding Primary School Class 5-8 (1987-1990)

Kyeni Girls Secondary School Form1-4 (1991-1994).

Andrew Crawford (2005).

== Career ==
Betty Kathungu started out her acting career in 1995 as a stage actress at Miujiza Players. She was featured in supporting roles in films like Babu’s Babies by Judy Kibinge and Naliaka is Going by Albert Wandago.

=== Feature films ===
Her journey as a film producer started in 2005 when she produced her first feature film, Wangai’s Cross, which is written by Nash Nderitu and directed by Gitura Kamau. The film was one of the first films to be aired on Mnet Kenya’s local film channel. It has since aired on Maisha Magic, K24, Showmax and Zuku.

Her second film, Kizingo (2015), was written and directed by Simiyu Barasa. Kizingo screened in India at the Bodhisattva International Film Festival and at the CMS International Children’s Film Festival in Lucknow. The film also screened in Nigeria at the Lakecity Film Festival, the Lake International Pan African Film Festival (LIPFF) in Kenya and at the Coast Film Festival in Kenya. Kizingo has so far been nominated for over 20 local and international awards and has won the following awards;

- Best Kenyan Film - Coast Film Festival
- Best Director -Lake International Pan African Film Festival (LIPFF)
- Best Feature Film - Riverwood Academy Awards Kenya

Kizingo also received mentions in several film forums for excellence in scripting and children's entertainment content.

Betty Kathungu's third and fourth films which she produced and directed are Marafiki (2016) in Swahili and Arata (2016) in Kikuyu, written by Allan Kariuki. They screened in Kameme TV and K24 TV in Kenya.

Her fifth feature film is Family Meeting, written and directed by Simiyu Barasa. She came to the public limelight after she successfully crowdfunded the film's budget through Facebook. Family Meeting became a critically acclaimed Kenyan Film that was nominated for over 25 awards and won in the following;

==== Coast film Festival ====
- Best Film
- Best Lead Actor
- Best Lead Actor
- Best Director of Photography

==== Kalasha International Awards ====
- Best Director

In 2020 Betty Kathungu's sixth feature film, Medicine Man (2020), became one of the first 12 films in Kenya to be funded by the government after Furet films received KSH 3 million to fund the film under the Film Empowerment Programme by the Kenya Film Commission. Medicine Man is set to premier in December 2021. She was the executive producer in the film, which is produced by Edijoe Mwaniki and Peter Kawa, written by Edijoe Mwaniki and directed by Simiyu Barasa.

The historic Film Empowerment Programme followed a Covid-19 stimulus package by President Uhuru Kenyatta that saw Sh100 million set aside for local artists, actors and musicians. The film industry got Sh8.9 million of the Sh 100 million Covid-19 stimulus package to support artists.

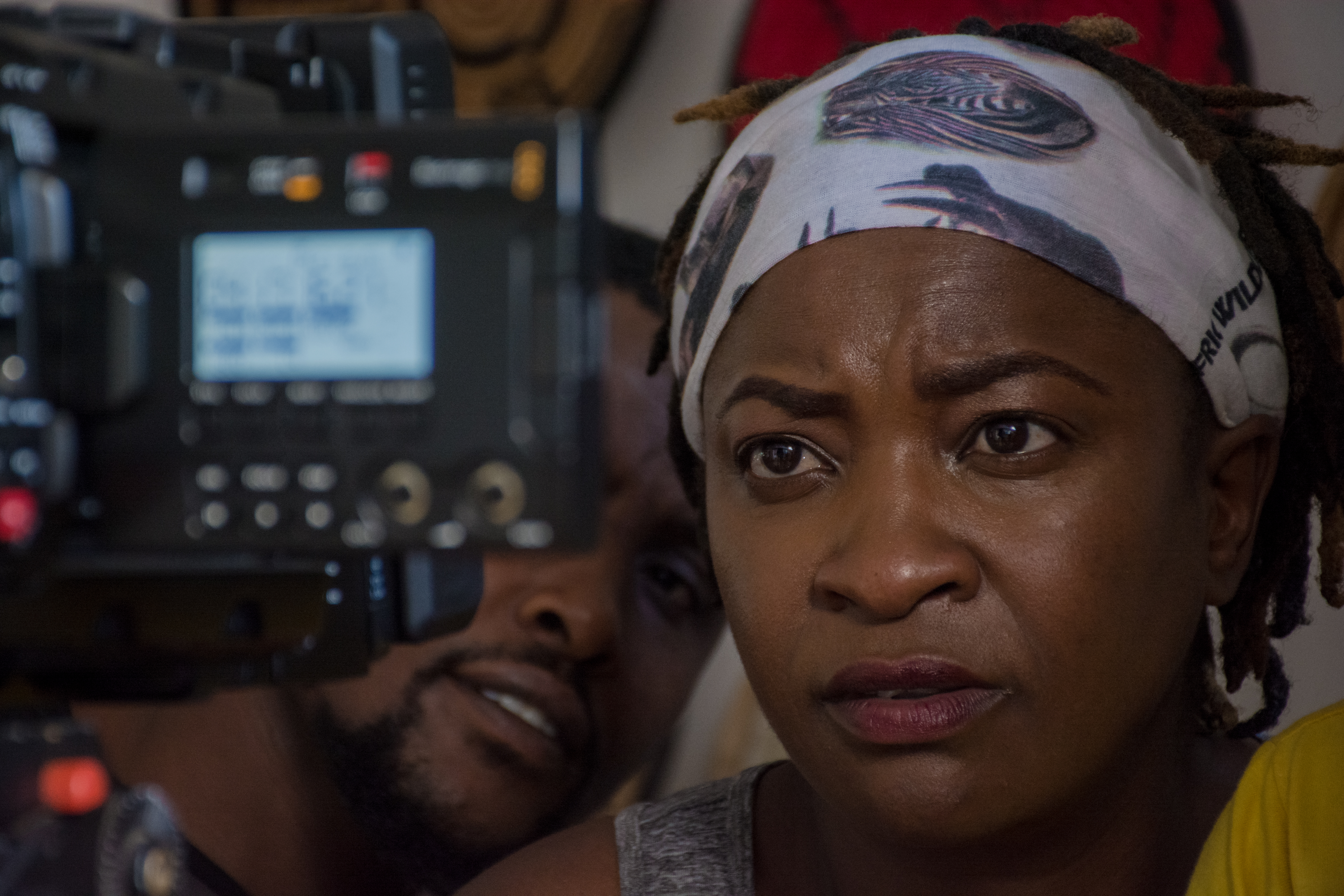
Betty Kathungu Furet on set

=== Short films ===
Betty Kathungu has also produced two short films; Drunk Dead (2012) and Ole-Naibon (2019). Drunk Dead, which is written by Bobby Mugah and directed by Gilbert Lukalia was sponsored by The Kenya Film Commission. Ole-Naibon, directed by Simiyu Barasa, was produced for the Nakuru Tourism Board .

=== TV productions ===
She has also created and produced 52 episodes of Mazagazaga (2014), a sketch comedy series in Swahili that aired first on Mnet, the TV1 Tanzania and KTN Kenya. She has also produced 32 episodes of a Kikuyu TV series called Magerio (2017) that aired on Kameme TV.

=== Documentary production ===
In 2012, Betty Kathungu produced a historical documentary called Castle of Love (2012), based on Lord Egerton of Tatton, who was a Kenyan colonialist that built a splendid castle for a Kenyan woman in Njoro location but the woman refused to marry him. The film was also sponsored by the Kenya Film Commission and is available on YouTube.

In 2017, she produced One Foot Ahead (2017), a documentary on legendary one-legged footballer Dalmas Otieno. One Foot Ahead won the award Sport & Society in The Cote d’Azur Sports Film Festival in Nice, France. It also won the Slum Film Festival Award for Best Social Impact Film.

== Achievements ==
Women In Film Awards Nominee for Best Producer 2020 & 2021

Embu County Film Hero (Shujaa) by Governor Martin Nyaga Wambora on Mashujaa Day 2020.
