= Waghmare =

Clan (Gotra) in Maharashtra

Waghmare वाघमारे
- Clan (Gotra) of Koli, Maratha and Mahar, Mang castes
- Ethnicity: Koli; Maratha; Mahar
- Location: Maharashtra; Goa; Karnataka
- Varna: Warrior for: Koli, Maratha and Mahar caste
- Parent tribe: Marathi people
- Language: Marathi; Koli; Hindi; English
- Religion: Hindu
- Surnames: Deshmukh; Patil

The Waghmare, Vaghmare, or Waghmore is a clan (Gotra) found in several castes such as Koli, Mahar, Marathas living in Maharashtra, Goa and Karnataka states of India.

== Notable ==
- Charan Waghmare, Indian politician
- Janardan Waghmare (born 1934), Indian politician
- Somnath Waghmare, Indian documentary filmmaker
- Umesh Waghmare, Indian physicist
