= Talegaon (disambiguation) =

Talegaon can refer to:

- Talegaon Dabhade - A historic city, a town with a municipal council, in Mawal Taluka, Pune district, in the Indian state of Maharashtra.
- Talegaon Dhamdhere - A historical place in which Sardar Jaysingrao Dhamdhere was in Panipat War. It is a town in Pune district of Maharashtra State, India
