= Somnath Waghmare =

Documentary filmmaker and Dalit activist

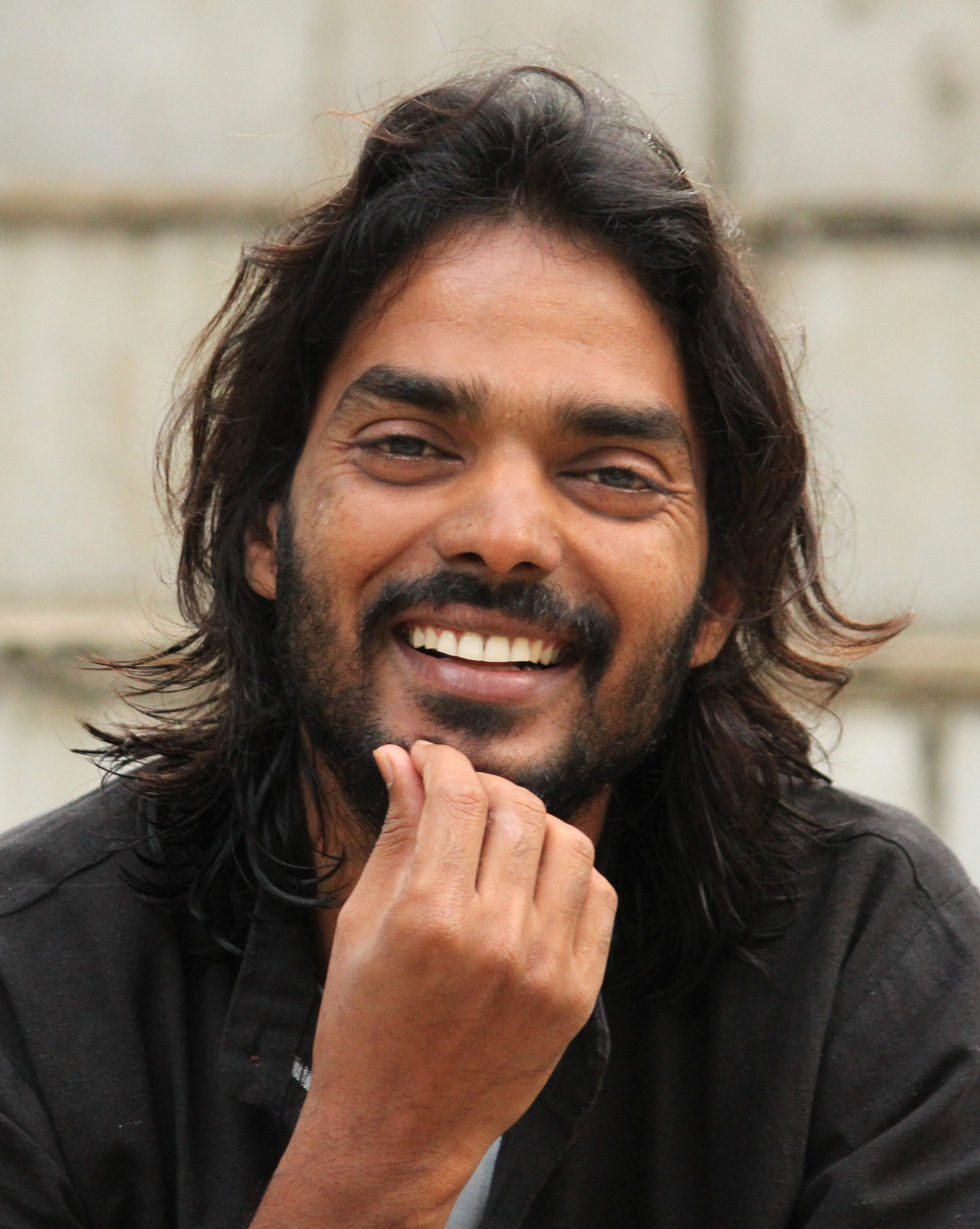
- Somnath Waghmare in 2018
- Born: Malewadi, Sangli district, Maharashtra, India
- Education: Savitribai Phule Pune University; Tata Institute of Social Sciences, Mumbai.
- Occupation: Filmmaker
- Years active: 2016–present
- Notable work: I Am Not A Witch; The Battle of Bhima Koregaon: An Unending Journey

Somnath Waghmare is an Indian researcher and documentary filmmaker based in the state of Maharashtra. His work is focused on documentation of political and social expression of Dalits in India, and his most recent and prominent film, Battle of Bhima Koregaon, was screened in India and abroad and received critically. Till now, all his films have been documentary films and they have dealt with various social issues like the persecution of women and Dalit assertion in Maharashtra. He made his directorial debut with the short documentary feature I Am Not a Witch (2017).

== Early life and education ==
Somnath was born in Dalit - Neo Buddhist labourers family at Malewadi, a small village in Sangli district, Maharashtra. He completed his graduation in sociology in from Shivaji University, Kolhapur and then attended Savitribai Phule Pune University in Pune for his post-graduate studies in Media and Communication Studies. After completing his post-graduate studies, Somnath worked for two years as a contract employee at the Film and Television Institute of India before joining the Tata Institute of Social Sciences in Mumbai for his M.Phil degree and then later Ph.D. in Social Sciences.

== Work ==
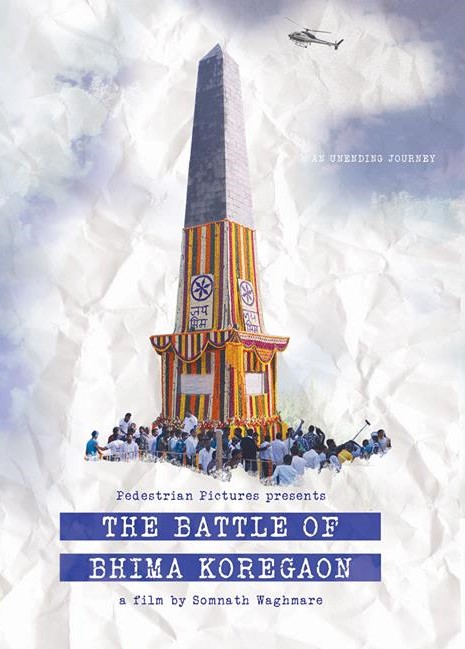
The Battle of Bhima Koregaon: An Unending Journey (2017)

Somnath has strong interests in the caste and cultural politics of Maharashtra. Both of his documentaries are focused on documentation and depiction of the political and social assertion by Dalits. He is also active in the anti-caste Phule-Ambedkarite movement of the state and has given several talks on caste in cinema, including at the Satyajit Ray Film and Television Institute in Kolkata. Waghmare's debut film I Am Not A Witch was a short documentary feature based on the persecution of marginalized women in Maharashtra. His second and most famous film Battle of Bhima Koregaon received was widely acclaimed. The film was screened at multiple locations in India and also in New York at the Dalit Film and Cultural Festival at Columbia University, New York, alongside the works of filmmakers such as Pa. Ranjith and Nagraj Manjule.

Waghmare is currently working on his third documentary film, Gail and Bharat, about Gail Omvedt and Bharat Patankar, two of the most distinguished activists and researchers of Dalit-Bahujan movements in the country. In 2020, Waghmare and Smita Rajmane received FICA Public Art Grant 2019 from The Foundation for Indian Contemporary Art for their project ‘The Ambedkar Age Digital Bookmobile’. In late 2023, Chaityabhumi was released and screened both in India and internationally, including the London School of Economics, Columbia University, and the University of Göttingen. This documentary is produced by director Pa. Ranjith’s Neelam Productions. The film was released on OTT platform MUBI on Ambedkar's birth anniversary, where it received positive reception from media outlets.

The Battle of Bhima Koregaon: An Unending Journey records how the memorial is a source of encouragement to those who are marginalized and discriminated against, especially today when caste-based atrocities are on the rise.

— Dipti Nagpaul, Indian Express.

== Filmography ==
=== As director ===
| Year | Film |
|---|---|
| 2016 | I Am Not A Witch |
| 2017 | The Battle of Bhima Koregaon: An Unending Journey |
| 2020 | Rajgruha Stands Tall |
| 2025 | Gail and Bharat Yashwant Painter (Research/Pre-production) |
| 2024 | Chaityabhumi |
| 2022 | Memories of Mangaon |
| 2023 | There is no Caste Discrimination in IITs? |
