= 102nd Prince of Wales's Own Grenadiers =

- Active: 1759–1922
- Country: (British Raj) British India
- Allegiance: British Empire
- Branch: British Indian Army
- Type: Infantry
- Size: Regiment
- Part of: Bombay Army (to 1895); Bombay Command
- Uniform: Red; faced white
- Engagements: French Revolutionary Wars; Third Anglo-Maratha War; First Afghan War; 1868 Expedition to Abyssinia; Second Afghan War; World War I

The 102nd Prince of Wales's Own Grenadiers was an infantry regiment of the British Indian Army. It could trace its origins to 1796, when it was raised as the 13th Battalion, Bombay Native Infantry.

The Grenadiers were part of the Indian army which was sent to Egypt in 1801, to fight against the Napoleonic Campaign in Egypt in the French Revolutionary Wars. In 1818, the regiment's soldiers fought in the Peshwa Wars, distinguishing themselves at the Battle of Koregaon in the Third Anglo-Maratha War.

In 1824 when it became a regiment in its own right, when it was named the 2nd or Grenadier Regiment of Bombay Native Infantry.

In 1840, it took part in the First Afghan War and then the 1868 Expedition to Abyssinia which was a punitive expedition carried out by armed forces of the British Empire against the Ethiopian Emperor Tewodros II of Ethiopia. In 1880, the unit took part in the Battle of Maiwand during the Second Afghan War. The regiment was stationed in Mhow, when in October 1902 it was order to go to Berbera, to fight in the Somaliland Campaign.

In 1903 in honour of the Coronation of the King-Emperor Edward VII., saw the renaming of the Regiment, the new title being: “102nd Prince of Wales’ Own Grenadiers.”

In November, 1905, the Prince and Princess of Wales (afterwards King George V. and Queen Mary) arrived in India, and proceeded to Indore, where headquarters and five companies of the Regiment proceeded as a Guard of Honour.

On the 1st January, 1906, in honour of the Royal visit to India, the Regiment received the title of ‘‘ King Edward’s Own,’’ with permission to wear the Royal Cipher on Colours and appointments.

World War I began with it being stationed at Muscat, Oman and served in the Mesopotamia Campaign with the 14th Indian Division, taking part in the Second Battle of Kut and the Fall of Baghdad (1917). A second battalion was raised in 1917 that served in the Sinai and Palestine Campaign.

After World War I the Indian government reformed the army, moving from single battalion regiments to multi-battalion regiments. In 1922, the 102nd Prince of Wales's Own Grenadiers became the 2nd Battalion, 4th Bombay Grenadiers.

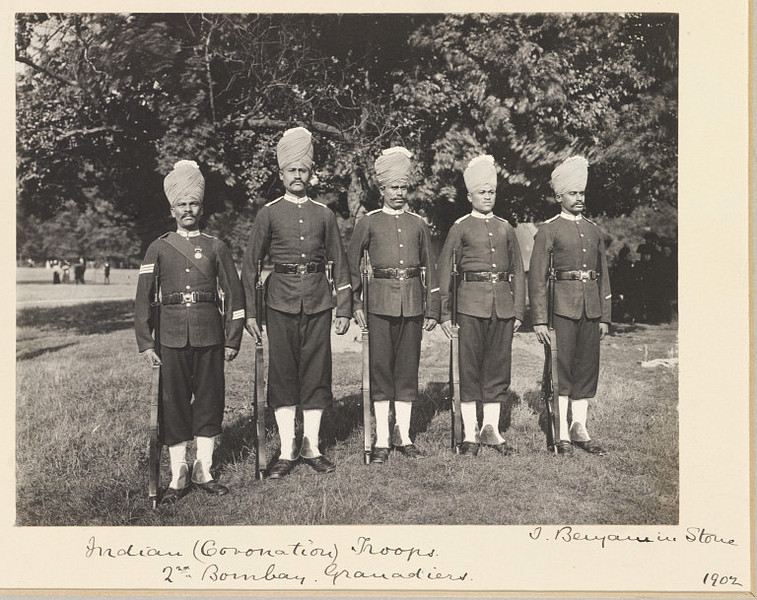
2nd Bombay Grenadiers in Hampton Court Camp on the occasion of the Coronation of King Edward VII, August 1902

== Designations ==
Year	Designation
1796	13th Battalion, Bombay Native Infantry
1797	1st Battalion, 5th Regiment Bombay Native Infantry
1798	2nd Battalion, 1st Regiment of Bombay Native Infantry
1818	2nd Battalion, Grenadier Regiment of Bombay Native Infantry
1824	2nd or Grenadier Regiment of Bombay Native Infantry
1876	2nd (Prince of Wales's Own) Regiment of Bombay Native Infantry (Grenadiers)
1885	2nd (Prince of Wales's Own) Regiment of Bombay Infantry (Grenadiers)
1901	2nd (Prince of Wales's Own) Bombay Grenadiers
1903	102nd Prince of Wales's Own Grenadiers
1906	102nd King Edward's Own Grenadiers
1922	2nd Battalion, 4th Bombay Grenadiers
1947	2nd Battalion, The Grenadiers
