= Sudhir Dhawale =

Actor, activist

Sudhir Dhawale is an Indian activist, actor and publisher of the bi-monthly Marathi magazine Vidrohi. He is also the founder of organisation, Republican Panthers.

== Personal life ==
Sudhir Dhawale was born into a family in Indora, a slum community in Nagpur.

== Activism and advocacy for Dalit rights ==
He has campaigned for the effective implementation of the Scheduled Caste and Scheduled Tribe (Prevention of Atrocities) Act, 1989. In particular he took up the cause of Dalits in violent incidents such as the Ramabai Nagar Dalit Hatyakand in Ghatkopar in Mumbai (1997), the Kherlanji massacre, Rohidas Tupe murder, Baban Misal murder, the Manorama Kamble gang rape and murder case in Nagpu and the Sahebrao Jondhale murder. Through his editorial, journalistic and stage work he tried to emphasize the plight of dalits in this day and age as some claim that he had no sympathies, much less showed support for, naxalites. They claim that he was a believer in doctrines of democracy and had therefore pursued the role of an activist rather than taking part in any armed struggle. His funding is also claimed to have come from fellow activists, donations and contributions from various people, including those that he tried to help. His wife was an activist for women's rights before marriage and afterwards took up nursing to support their family while he pursued activism.

=== Initiatives and organizational contributions ===
In the aftermath of the 2002 Gujarat riots, he launched his magazine, Vidrohi. In the aftermath of the Khairlanji massacre in 2006, he started the Ramabai Nagar-Khairlanji Hatyaakand Virodhi Sangharsh Samiti.

He is a founding member of the Republican Panther Jaatiya Antachi Chalwal formed on 6 December 2007, for the elimination of the caste system in India, mostly as a reaction to the state action against 2006 Dalit protests in Maharashtra.

In 2013, his organization attended the Chandigarh conference on Marxism and caste organized by Arvind Memorial Trust.

== Arrest and controversy ==
On 2 January 2011, he was arrested from Wardha railway station by a team of Gondia police and a team from the Nagpur division of ATS, while trying to board a train to Mumbai. He was taken to Gondia and produced before a local court which awarded police his custody until 12 January 2011. Subsequently, he was booked for waging war against the state under section 121 of the Indian Penal Code and charged with sedition (Sec 124) and booked under Sections 17, 20 and 39 of the Unlawful Activities Prevention Act (UAPA). This put Dhawale at the center of a human rights controversy.

His arrest is controversial due to:

1. allegedly illegal entry and search of his Mumbai apartment, carried out when his wife was away at work and only his two children, aged 10 and 15, were at home.
2. the seizure and inventorying of seized articles was allegedly done in the absence of credible independent witnesses and his wife was made to sign the list allegedly under duress.

== Controversies and legal challenges ==
Activists and media are drawing attention to parallels with perceived persecution of Dr. Binayak Sen from Chhattisgarh due to alleged but unproven links with the naxal movement and social activism.

Dhawale co-organised the Elgaar Parishad on 31 December 2017, to commemorate the two-hundredth anniversary of the Bhima Koregaon Battle. The event was followed by violent clashes. In response, the state government set up an inquiry commission headed by a retired judge to look into the riots. Dhawale and fellow activists went around gathering evidence to put before the commission.

On 6 June 2018, he was arrested by Pune Police in a joint operation, in which four others- Surendra Gadling, Shoma Sen, Mahesh Raut and Rona Wilson- were also arrested. They were accused of having Maoist links and charged under the Unlawful Activities Prevention Act (UAPA).
