= Mahesh Raut =

Indian land rights and Adivasi rights activist

- Born: Mahesh Sitaram Raut; 1 July 1987 (age 39); Lakhapur, Chandrapur district, Maharashtra, India
- Education: Tata Institute of Social Sciences
- Occupations: Land rights activist, social worker, writer
- Organization(s): Visthapan Virodhi Jan Vikas Andolan (co-convener); Bharat Jan Andolan
- Known for: Gram Sabha mobilisation under the Forest Rights Act and PESA Act; anti-mining organising in Gadchiroli; Bhima Koregaon–Elgar Parishad case

Mahesh Sitaram Raut (born 1 July 1987) is an Indian land-rights and Adivasi rights activist from Gadchiroli district, Maharashtra. A graduate of the Tata Institute of Social Sciences (TISS) and a former Prime Minister's Rural Development Fellow, Raut has spent over a decade organising Gram Sabhas in Gadchiroli to assert rights under the Forest Rights Act and the Panchayats (Extension to Scheduled Areas) Act (PESA), helping communities take direct control of forest produce trade away from middlemen and supporting Adivasi candidates in local body elections against a backdrop of large-scale mining projects in the region. He is also the youngest of the accused in the Bhima Koregaon–Elgar Parishad case, arrested on 6 June 2018 and charged under the Unlawful Activities (Prevention) Act (UAPA) over alleged links to the banned CPI (Maoist). As of 2026, he remains an undertrial, having spent most of the period since 2018 in Taloja Central Jail amid a prolonged, unresolved bail process, during which he has also written published first-person accounts of prison conditions.

== Early life and education ==
Raut was born on 1 July 1987 in Lakhapur village, Chandrapur district, in Maharashtra's Vidarbha region; he spent most of his childhood and student life in neighbouring Gadchiroli district with his maternal grandparents childhood. His father worked as a police patil, a village-level quasi-judicial officer. He completed his early schooling at Navodaya Vidyalaya, Gadchiroli, moved to Nagpur for further studies, and briefly worked as a primary school teacher in Kendriya Vidyalaya in OF Chanda, Bhadravati and Vasco, Goa. In 2009 he joined the Tata Institute of Social Sciences (TISS), Mumbai, to pursue a master's degree in social work, completing it in 2011.

== Activism and community work ==
After completing his degree, Raut was selected for the Prime Minister's Rural Development Fellowship (PMRDF), which placed him in Gadchiroli — a district long affected by the Naxalite–Maoist insurgency — where he worked with the district administration for two years. He has said he began working with Gadchiroli's Adivasi communities in 2011 and joined a struggle local people were already leading, rather than initiating it himself. He chose to continue working in the region after the fellowship ended rather than pursue conventional employment. The then Gadchiroli District Collector,described Raut's fieldwork as "the best among all other PMRD fellows who work under me."

His work centred on:

- Forest and land rights and the "tendu rebellion": mobilising Gram Sabhas to secure community forest rights titles under the Forest Rights Act and assert self-governance rights under the PESA Act. He is credited with helping tribal communities gain direct control over the harvesting and marketing of forest produce such as tendu leaves and bamboo, previously controlled by the forest department and contractors, including campaigning for tendu-leaf collection tenders to be awarded directly to Adivasi Gram Sabhas rather than through middlemen. Following the Maharashtra government's 2015 deregulation of the tendu trade, a cluster of villages in the district — around 48 of them, by 2017 — began selling their tendu harvest directly to buyers rather than through contractors, a shift widely referred to locally as the "tendu rebellion"; Gadchiroli's tendu trade was worth around ₹400 crore that year, some 70% of Maharashtra's total tendu economy, with royalty and labour payments flowing directly to Gram Sabhas and collectors rather than middlemen.
- Mining opposition: educating Gram Sabhas that their free, prior consent was legally required before any mining lease could be granted on their land, and organising democratic resistance against mining projects such as the Surjagarh mining project near Thakurdev hill in Etapalli, a site considered sacred by local Madia Gond Adivasis. A 2020 commentary noted that while the Gadchiroli mining sector generated an estimated ₹4,745 crore in tax revenue in 2019–20, per-capita monthly income in the district had been recorded at only around ₹7,144 in 2017–18, a disparity that supporters cite as central to the grievance Raut's organising sought to address.
- Electoral organising: he supported local Adivasi candidates contesting Zila Parishad and Panchayat Samiti elections on explicitly anti-mining, anti-displacement platforms. In local body polls in 2017, several Gram Sabha-backed candidates he had worked alongside — including Lalsu Soma Nagoti and Sainu Gota, who won Zila Parishad seats from Bhamragad and Gattapad respectively, and Sukhram Mandavi and Pramila Juru Kudiyami, who won Panchayat Samiti seats — gave Gram Sabhas a three-fourths majority on the Bhamragad Panchayat Samiti, a result described in Indian media as tribal communities' own answer to the disenfranchisement satirised in the Bollywood film Newton. Raut himself remarked on the significance of Kudiyami's win, noting that "hardly any woman from this marginalised community gets a chance to become a public representative." Opponents of this organising sometimes mocked the results, with Raut recalling that after Nagoti and Gota's wins, critics joked "the Maoists have entered the zilla parishad" — a claim Raut has rejected by pointing out that contesting and winning constitutional elections is the opposite of insurgency.
- Organisational roles: he has served as a central convener and committee member of the Visthapan Virodhi Jan Vikas Andolan (VVJVA), an anti-displacement movement active in Jharkhand as well as Maharashtra, and as a member of the Bharat Jan Andolan, a human rights organisation founded by former IAS officer B.D. Sharma.
- Writing: in 2017, Raut co-authored with conservationist Neema Pathak Broome an account documenting sustained democratic resistance by Gadchiroli's Adivasi communities against mining and displacement.

Local Adivasi leaders have credited Raut's work with tangible gains for their communities. Zila Parishad member Sainu Masum Gota said Raut had educated villagers about the Forest Rights Act and PESA Act since 2013 and had taught them to assert their rights and market their own forest produce.

In June 2013, during his PMRDF posting, Raut and a fellow activist were detained for roughly 30 hours by Gadchiroli police's anti-Naxal C-60 unit after being found in a village where alleged Maoists had separately been arrested; police accused them of visiting to meet a Maoist leader, an allegation Raut and local villagers denied, saying the pair had been on a routine village visit and had gone to sleep at the house of the village headman before the unrelated arrests occurred. A Gadchiroli Zila Parishad member,said at the time that the two were being targeted for their "visible opposition" to proposed mining projects in the area.

This was not an isolated episode: contemporary reporting described PMRDF fellows and grassroots activists in Naxal-affected districts more broadly as being caught between demands from Maoist insurgents and suspicion from security forces, a dynamic that shaped the environment in which Raut's Gadchiroli work took place.

Around 80 former PMRDF fellows, along with former Union Rural Development Minister, publicly defended Raut after his 2018 arrest, describing him as one of the best-performing fellows to have served in a conflict-affected district.

A college friend, writer Sohini Shoaib, recalled in a 2018 personal essay that Raut had been a calm, widely trusted figure since their university days, and that villagers in Gadchiroli treated him "as if he were a member of their own house." She noted that a media report alleging he had travelled to Brazil to "mobilise" people against the Indian government in fact referred to his attendance at an international political education programme at the Escola Nacional Florestan Fernandes.

== Arrest and the Bhima Koregaon–Elgar Parishad case ==
=== Background ===
The case originates in the Elgar Parishad, a conclave held on 31 December 2017 at Shaniwarwada, Pune, commemorating the 200th anniversary of the Battle of Bhima Koregaon. Police alleged that speeches at the event incited caste-based violence the following day near the Bhima Koregaon war memorial.

=== Arrest ===
On 6 June 2018, Raut was arrested in Nagpur along with fellow activists Surendra Gadling and Shoma Sen, in a coordinated nationwide operation that also saw Sudhir Dhawale arrested in Mumbai and Rona Wilson in Delhi. He was charged under the UAPA. He is one of sixteen activists, lawyers, academics and cultural workers eventually arrested in the wider case, including Sudha Bharadwaj, Varavara Rao, Vernon Gonsalves, Arun Ferreira, Anand Teltumbde, Gautam Navlakha, Hany Babu, Shoma Sen, Rona Wilson, Surendra Gadling, Sudhir Dhawale, Ramesh Gaichor, Sagar Gorkhe, Jyoti Jagtap, and Stan Swamy (who died in judicial custody in July 2021). The prosecution's case against Raut rests on a letter allegedly recovered from co-accused Rona Wilson's computer, in which the National Investigation Agency (NIA) claims a payment of 5 lakh rupees was made by a person referred to as "Mahesh" to help fund the Elgar Parishad event. Raut's family and colleagues have disputed the charges, stating that after his arrest, police reportedly questioned him only about mining projects in Gadchiroli and not about Bhima Koregaon. In February 2020, investigation of the case was transferred, amid political controversy within Maharashtra's coalition government, from Pune Police to the NIA, a move some state leaders publicly opposed; reporting around the same period noted that spyware attributed to the Pegasus tool had been used against the devices of several people associated with the accused. The accused were subsequently moved to Mumbai's Arthur Road Jail before being lodged at Taloja Central Jail.

=== Bail proceedings ===
Bail was repeatedly denied by the Special NIA Court and lower courts between 2018 and 2023. On 21 September 2023, a Bombay High Court bench of Justices A.S. Gadkari and Sharmila Deshmukh granted Raut regular bail on merits, becoming the sixth co-accused to secure such relief, holding that prima facie Sections 16, 17 and 18 of the UAPA were not made out against him. The High Court stayed its own order for a week at the NIA's request to allow an appeal, and on 27 September 2023 the Supreme Court extended that stay — which remained in effect for roughly two years despite the underlying High Court finding in Raut's favour. During this period he was granted brief spells of interim bail: two weeks in June–July 2024 to attend rituals following his grandmother's death, and six weeks from 16 September 2025 (later extended to 26 November 2025) on medical grounds, after he was diagnosed with rheumatoid arthritis requiring specialised treatment. After that interim bail lapsed, a Special NIA Court in January 2026 rejected a plea for him to travel to Kerala for further Ayurvedic treatment, citing bail conditions confining him to the Bombay High Court's jurisdiction; Raut challenged that rejection before the High Court in July 2026, a plea pending at the time of writing.

UN human rights experts expressed concern in October 2018 that the charges against Raut and fellow accused were being used to silence human rights defenders working on Dalit, indigenous and tribal rights, and approximately 300 Gram Sabhas in Gadchiroli passed resolutions in support of Raut following his arrest, with villagers highlighting his work on forest rights.

== Health in custody ==
Raut suffered from acute ulcerative colitis around the time of his arrest and subsequently in custody. In July 2020, he showed COVID-19 symptoms and moved the Bombay High Court seeking a test. In early 2025, he was diagnosed with two autoimmune conditions, rheumatoid arthritis and Sjögren's syndrome; in a first-person account, Raut wrote that the diagnosis was made only after he repeatedly requested testing due to severe pain, and that adequate treatment was unavailable inside the prison system, which led him to seek medical bail through the courts. In the same account, he wrote that he had witnessed a fellow prisoner die of an untreated heart attack after guards failed to secure timely medical attention, and drew a comparison with the death in custody of his co-accused Stan Swamy.

== Writings ==
Raut has written and co-written several pieces documenting Adivasi activism and prison conditions:

- In 2017, he co-authored with conservationist Neema Pathak Broome an article, "Mining in Gadchiroli – Building a Castle of Injustices" (Countercurrents), on grassroots democratic resistance to mining and displacement in the region.
- "Inside Taloja Prison: A Study" (Outlook, 17 May 2025) is a first-person account of conditions at Taloja Central Prison, including severe overcrowding and observations on the young, often economically disadvantaged undertrial population held there.
- "Notes From Inside Taloja Prison" (Outlook, June 2025) is a further first-person piece on prison life written during his incarceration.
- "A Broken Prison System Is in Dire Need of Critical Care" (Outlook, 22 January 2026) is a first-person account, written while on interim medical bail, describing the lack of medical infrastructure, staff and diagnostic care in Indian prisons, drawing on his own diagnosis and his experience witnessing another prisoner's death, and situating prison healthcare neglect within broader patterns of disadvantage faced by marginalised undertrials.
- Friends and family have described receiving letters and pencil sketches from Raut during his imprisonment; a college friend has separately recalled that sketching was a habit of his since their university days.
- According to an essay by philosophers Shaj Mohan and Divya Dwivedi published in The Wire in June 2024 (an excerpt from their book Indian Philosophy, Indian Revolution), Raut scored in the 99.79th percentile in the state Common Entrance Test (CET) for law while in prison, studying with books obtained from the prison library.

== Reception ==
Raut's grassroots work has been credited in Indian media with concrete gains for Gadchiroli's Adivasi communities, including local body election wins by Gram Sabha-backed candidates and a shift of tendu-leaf revenue away from middlemen and toward village-level control. District administration officials who worked with him during his PMRDF fellowship separately praised the quality of his fieldwork. Journalists and rights groups have also widely described Raut as the youngest accused in the Bhima Koregaon case. Article 14 has profiled him as an Adivasi rights defender and a former fellow of "a prestigious prime ministerial programme," also noting that he is the son of a police official. The 2024 Wire essay by Mohan and Dwivedi frames his imprisonment within a broader argument about caste and state power in India. A 2018 personal essay by his college friend, writer Sohini Shoaib, argued against the "urban Maoist" characterisation used by police and some media, instead describing him as a well-regarded, non-violent community organiser. Legal commentary from CJP and LawBeat has focused on the anomaly of his case: the Bombay High Court found insufficient evidence against him and granted bail in 2023, yet procedural stays kept him incarcerated for roughly two more years, a pattern described as illustrative of broader concerns about UAPA bail jurisprudence.

== See also ==
- 2018 Bhima Koregaon violence
- Stan Swamy
- Unlawful Activities (Prevention) Act
