= Prabhachiwadi =

Village in Maharashtra

- Village
- Location in Maharashtra, India Prabhachiwadi (India)
- Coordinates: 18.5204303°N 73.8567437°E
- Country: India
- State: Maharashtra
- District: Pune
- Tehsil: Mawal

Government
  - Type: Panchayati Raj
  - Body: Gram panchayat

Area
  - Total: 141.05 ha (348.5 acres)

Population (2011)
  - Total: 447
  - Density: 317/km^{2} (821/sq mi)
- Sex ratio 238 / 209 ♂/♀

Languages
  - Official: Marathi
  - Other spoken: Hindi
- Time zone: UTC+5:30 (IST)
- Pin code: 410406
- Telephone code: 02114
- ISO 3166 code: IN-MH
- Vehicle registration: MH-14
- Website: pune.nic.in

Prabhachiwadi is a village in India, situated in the Mawal taluka of Pune district in the state of Maharashtra. It encompasses an area of 141.05 ha (349 acres).

== Administration ==
The village is administrated by a sarpanch, an elected representative who leads a gram panchayat. At the time of the 2011 Census of India, the gram panchayat governed five villages and was based at Mahagaon.

== Demography ==
According to the 2011 census, the population was 447, split between 238 males and 209 females. There were 59 children with an age group from 0-6, which made up 13.20% of the total population. The Average Sex Ratio was 878 per 1000 males and the Child Sex Ratio was 735. The literacy rate was 70.10%, with the male rate being 81.37% and the female standing at 57.61%. This village had 79 households.

== See also ==
- List of villages in Mawal taluka
