= Sawantwadi, Mawal =

Village in Maharashtra

Sawantwadi
- Village
- Location in Maharashtra, India Sawantwadi (India)
- Country: India
- State: Maharashtra
- District: Pune
- Tehsil: Mawal

Government
  - Type: Panchayati Raj
  - Body: Gram panchayat

Area
  - Total: 322.50 ha (796.9 acres)

Population (2011)
  - Total: 887
  - Density: 275/km^{2} (712/sq mi)
- Sex ratio 460 / 427 ♂/♀

Languages
  - Official: Marathi
  - Other spoken: Hindi
- Time zone: UTC+5:30 (IST)
- Website: pune.nic.in

Sawantwadi is a village in India, situated in the Mawal taluka of Pune district in the state of Maharashtra. It encompasses an area of 322.50 ha (797 acres).

== Administration ==
The village is administrated by a sarpanch, an elected representative who leads a gram panchayat. At the time of the 2011 Census of India, the gram panchayat governed five villages and was based at Mahagaon.

== Demographics ==
At the 2011 census, the village comprised 141 households. The population of 887 was split between 460 males and 427 females.

== See also ==
- List of villages in Mawal taluka
