= Family Meeting (film) =

Film

- Directed by: Simiyu Barasa
- Written by: Simiyu Barasa
- Produced by: Betty Kathungu Furet
- Release date: 2019
- Country: Kenya

Family Meeting is a 2019 Kenyan feature film produced by Betty Kathungu Furet and written and directed by Simiyu Barasa. The film became popular in Kenya after the producers successfully crowdfunded the budget through Facebook.

== Synopsis ==
Jesse (Gitura Kamau), Moses (Abubakar Muindi) & his fiancée Alison (Maureen Koech) and Barbara (Akinyi Aluoch) meet at their Parents’ home (Raymond Ofula & Florence Nduta), to celebrate their 40th Wedding Anniversary but the celebration turns into a fighting match of siblings. Conflict and untold secrets threaten to tear a once happy family apart.
