= Surendra Gadling =

Human rights lawyer, Dalit rights activist

- Occupation: Human rights lawyer

Surendra Gadling is a human rights lawyer and Dalit rights activist based in Nagpur.

== Personal life ==
Surendra was born into a Dalit family in Indora, a slum community in Nagpur. He lives in Bhim Chowk with his wife, two children and mother.

== Work ==
Surendra started his career as an apprentice in the railways.

He is known for taking up cases of illegal killings, police excesses, fakes cases, and atrocities against Dalits and Adivasis in Gadchiroli and Gondia districts. He is considered to be an expert in special laws like UAPA, the Forest Rights Act, Scheduled Castes and Scheduled Tribes (Prevention of Atrocities) Act.

He represented Arun Ferreira between 2007 and 2012. Until his arrest, he was handling the case of G.N. Saibaba, a Delhi University professor and wheelchair user who was jailed for alleged Naxal links. Advocate Mihir Desai took over the case from him.

He is known to take up most of his cases pro bono.

== Activism ==
While working as an apprentice in the Railways, Surendra started the Awhan Natya Manch, which would organise cultural evenings in the bastis of Nagpur and engage in conversations around rights and oppressions.

Gadling was part of an independent fact-finding team that probed the encounter killing of 40 alleged Maoists by the police in Gadhchiroli in April 2018.

He was a member of the Committee for Protection of Democratic Rights (CPDR) and CRPP.

== Arrest ==
On 25 December 2016, Surendra Gadling was arrested along with Varavara Rao in the Surajgarh Mine Arson Case. On 6 June 2018 he was arrested by the Pune Police, along with four others- Sudhir Dhawale, Shoma Sen, Rona Wilson and Mahesh Raut. They were accused of having Maoist links and were charged under the Unlawful Activities (Prevention) Act (UAPA). On 8 June 2018, he was moved from police remand to judicial custody on account of his deteriorating health condition, after he was moved to Sasoon Hospital in Pune.
