= Mahagaon, Mawal =

Village in Maharashtra

Mahagaon
- Village
- Location in Maharashtra, India Mahagaon (India)
- Coordinates: 18.6644147°N 72.9295735°E
- Country: India
- State: Maharashtra
- District: Pune
- Tehsil: Mawal

Government
  - Type: Panchayati Raj
  - Body: Gram panchayat

Area
  - Total: 375.37 ha (927.6 acres)

Population (2011)
  - Total: 872
  - Density: 232/km^{2} (602/sq mi)
- Sex ratio 447/425 ♂/♀

Languages
  - Official: Marathi
  - Other spoken: Hindi
- Time zone: UTC+5:30 (IST)
- Pin code: 410405
- Telephone code: 02114
- ISO 3166 code: IN-MH
- Vehicle registration: MH-14
- Website: pune.nic.in

Mahagaon is a village and gram panchayat in India, situated in Mawal taluka of Pune district in the state of Maharashtra. It encompasses an area of 375.37 ha (928 acres).

== Administration ==
The village is administrated by a sarpanch, an elected representative who leads a gram panchayat. At the time of the 2011 Census of India, the village was the headquarters for the eponymous gram panchayat, which also governed the villages of Dhalewadi, Malewadi, Prabhachiwadi and Sawantwadi.

== Demographics ==
At the 2011 census, the village comprised 157 households. The population of 872 was split between 447 males and 425 females.

== Air travel connectivity ==
The closest airport to the village is Pune Airport.

== See also ==
- List of villages in Mawal taluka
