= Bodhisattava International Film Festival =

Annual film festival

- Logo of BIFF 2017
- Opening film: 2016
- Location: Patna, Bihar, India
- Founded: 2016
- Hosted by: Grameen Sneh Foundation
- Festival date: February
- Language: International
- Website: www.biffindia.com

Bodhisattava International Film Festival (BIFF) is an annual film event held in Patna, Bihar. The first edition of this film festival was held in February, 2016. Bodhisattava International Film Festival (BIFF) is organised by Grameen Sneh Foundation.

== About BIFF ==
For the first time in 2016, Bihar found a new voice, steeped in truth, with Bodhisattava International Film Festival (BIFF). The first of its kind film festival, BIFF was organised as an initiative to promote the rich culture, tradition and heritage of Bihar whilst also encouraging cultural exchanges with different regions, states and countries. In its founding year, the festival was called ‘Kala and Film Mahotsav 2016’, but has been rechristened as Bodhisattva International Film Festival. BIFF is a confluence like no other, dedicated to provide a platform for the voices of truth and change.

BIFF is part of the ‘Bihar Ek Virasat’ campaign, an initiative of the Grameen Sneh Foundation (GSF). Through this campaign, GSF aims to create awareness about the art, culture, traditions, heritage and legacy of Bihar, all around the world.

== Events ==
=== BIFF – 2016 ===
“Kala & Film Mahotsav 2016” was organised by Grameen Sneh Foundation. It was 4 days film festival where various Bollywood Actors, Actress and Dignitaries participated which was a huge success. Folk Dance, Painting & Essay competition was held in the 9 commissionaires of Bihar throughout the year which witnessed huge number of participation from people across the state & whose finale will be held in Bodhisattva International Film Festival 2017 (BIFF 2017).

=== BIFF – 2017 ===
BIFF 2017 will be held from 16 to 23 February 2017 in Patna, Bihar. The venue for the Film Festival would be the grand Adhiveshan Bhawan in the Secretariat campus. 3543 Films from 122 countries have been received as entries to the festival under Feature film, Documentaries and Shorts categories. From which more than 150 movies to be screened and most of the films are from India, Iran, USA, France, Italy, Spain, U.K., Turkey, Russia, Brazil, Germany, Argentina, Bangladesh, Canada, Portugal, Austria, Maxico, Poland Australia, Indonesia, etc. And many small countries are participating for the first time in such kind of festival.

Bodhisattva Voice of Change – Lifetime Achievement Award is going to Nana Patekar for his contribution to Indian cinema and dedication in the field of social work and responsibility.

== About Grameen Sneh Foundation ==
Grameen Sneh Foundation (GSF) is a national level NGO established in the year 2009 with a zealous endeavour of striving endlessly towards the welfare of poor people underprivileged cancer patients, without distinction of caste or religion. GSF’s mission is to provide improved quality of life to every individual through sustained change in their social, physical, economical status with special emphasis on the rural people and most vulnerable section of the society like women, children and elder people.

== See also ==
- Dalit Film and Cultural Festival
