= Shoma Sen =

Academician, activist

Shoma Sen is a women's rights activist and assistant professor and was head of the English literature department of the Nagpur University. On 8 June 2018, she was arrested by the Pune Police for her alleged involvement in the Bhima Koregaon riots.

== Personal life ==
Shoma was born and raised in an upper-middle class Bengali family in Bandra, Mumbai. She did her schooling from St. Joseph's Convent. After completing her master's degree from Elphinstone College in Mumbai, she pursued her M.Phil and Ph.D in Nagpur University. She is married to Tushar Kanti Bhattacharya, a writer and translator and has a daughter, Koel, who is a filmmaker. Shoma lives in Nagpur.

== Activism ==
Shoma Sen has worked with the Committee for the Protection of Democratic Rights (CPDR), a human rights organisation. Shoma has been the president of Nagpur University Teachers' Association (NUTA). She was arrested on 6 June 2018 by the Pune Police, and later suspended from her position in Nagpur University. No charges have been proved yet by the prosecution and an ongoing case is due for trial at the Bombay High Court. Shoma has spent more than 528 days (1 and half years) of incarceration already. Shoma was a part of a women's organisation in Nagpur, called Stree Chetna which discussed issues such as violence against women and dowry deaths.

== Arrest ==
On 8 June 2018, she was arrested by the Pune Police along with Sudhir Dhawale, Mahesh Raut, Surendra Gadling and Rona Wilson. They were charged under the Unlawful Activities (Prevention) Act for their alleged involvement in the Bhima Koregaon violence. At the time of her arrest, she was nearing retirement. On 15 June, she was suspended from her position in Nagpur University on grounds that she had been in police custody for more than 48 hours.

She was granted bail on 6 April 2024.
