= Dalit Film and Cultural Festival =

Dalit Film and Cultural festival (DALIFF) is an international Film festival dedicated to Dalit-Bahujan cinema. This festival gives platform to content from dalit issues victimised by caste discrimination and often ignored by mainstream. First Dalit Film and Cultural festival was held in New York City in February 2019. Various films by Ambedkarite Dalit artists were screened.The Hollywood Reporter stated that the first Dalit Film Festival victoriously unspooled in New York.

== See also ==
- Dalit literature
- Dalit studies
- Pa. Ranjith
- Dalit
- Bodhisattava International Film Festival
