= Taloja Central Jail =

Prison in Kharghar, Maharashtra, India

Coordinates: 19.0780°N 73.0683°E

Taloja Central Jail is a prison in the node of Taloja near Taloja Panchnand railway station of the city of Navi Mumbai in the state of Maharashtra in India. It was opened in 2008 and has capacity for 3000 inmates.

The Indian Jesuit Roman Catholic priest and tribal rights activist Stan Swamy was held there preceding his death in 2021.
