= Talegaon Dhamdhere =

Village in Maharashtra

- village
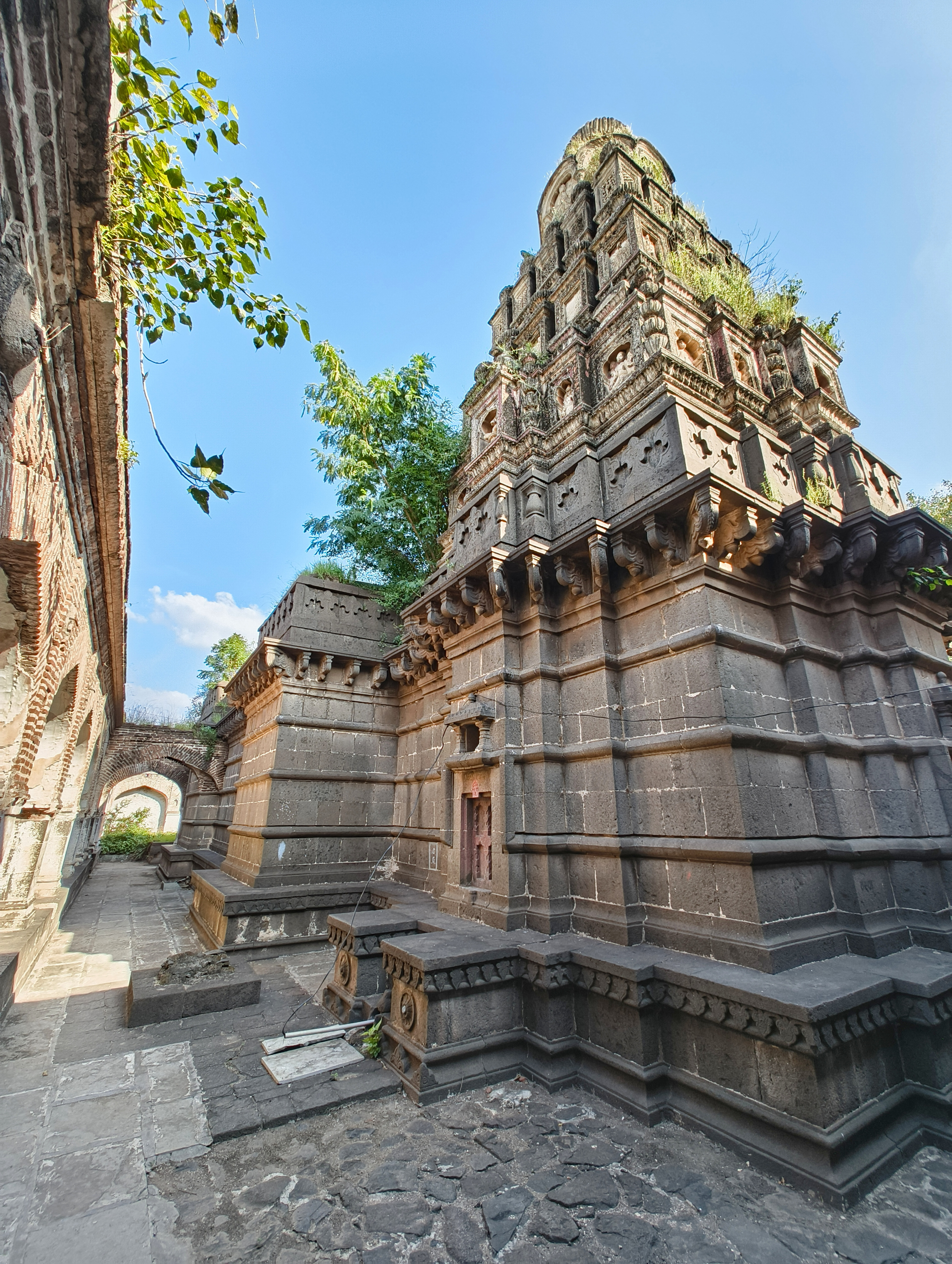
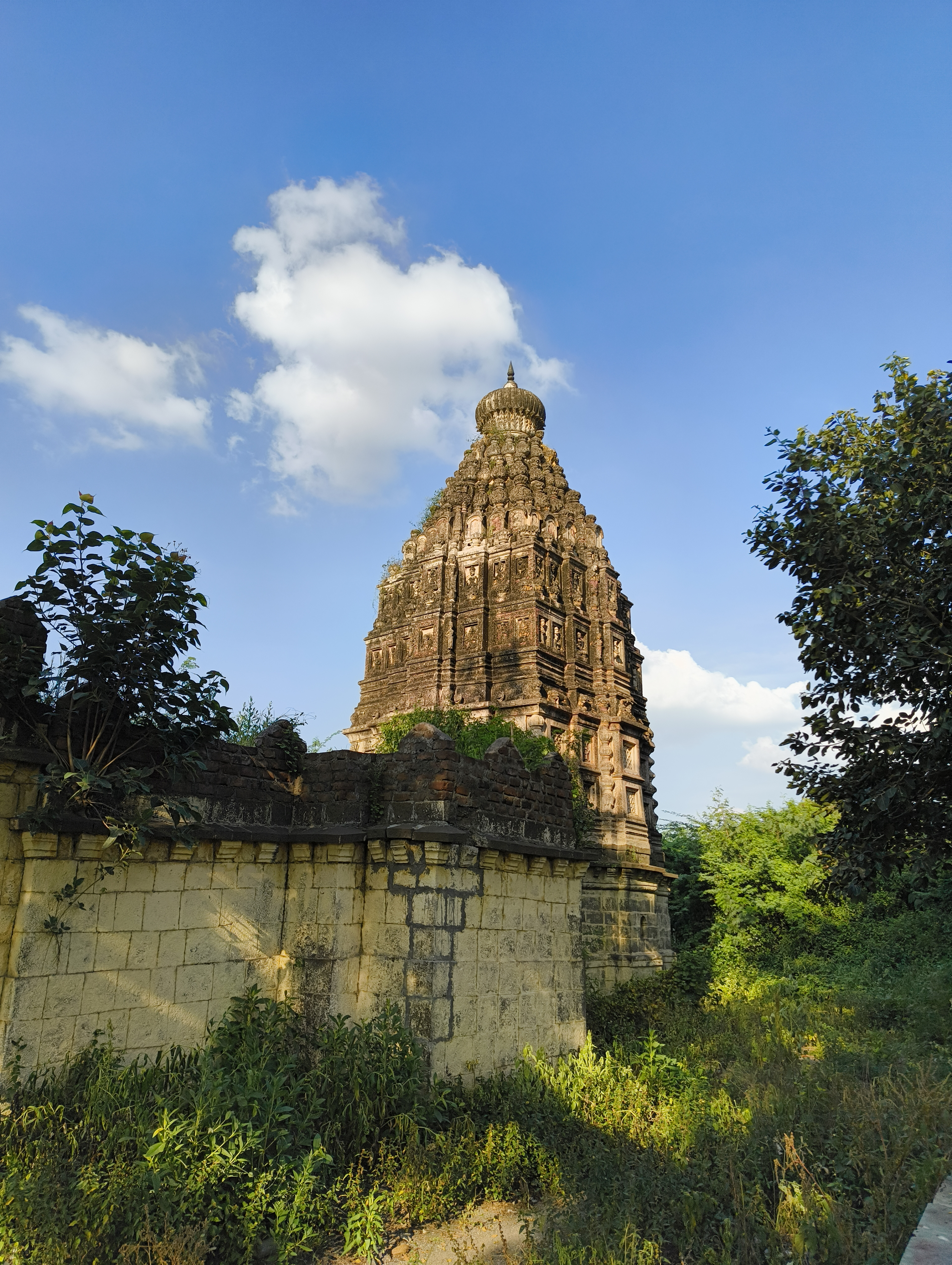
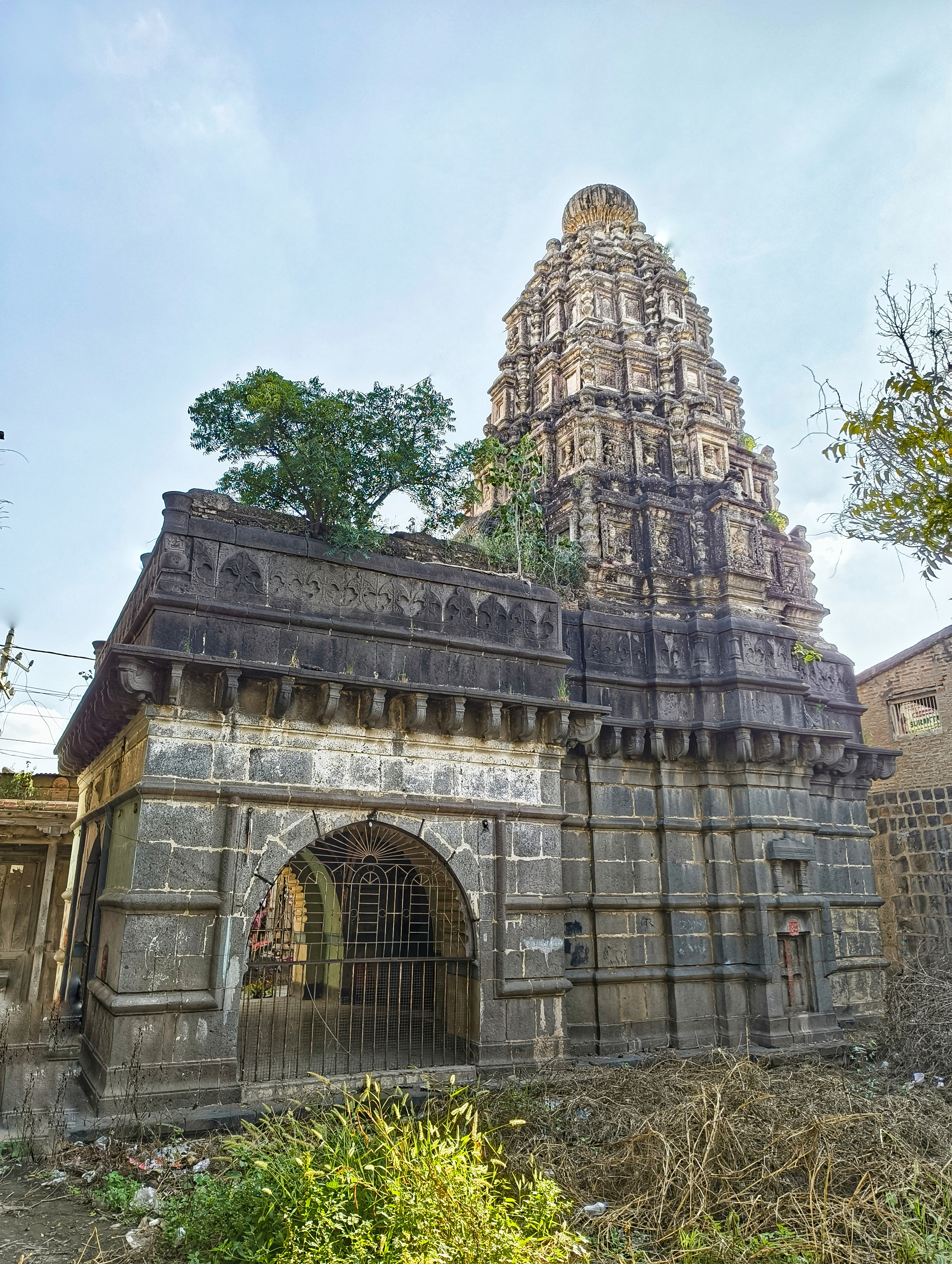
- Siddheshwar Temple Uttareshwar Temple Sardar Ganpati Temple

- Location in Maharashtra, India Talegaon Dhamdhere (India)
- Coordinates: 18°40′04″N 074°09′13″E
- Country: India
- State: Maharashtra
- District: Pune
- Taluka: Shirur

Government
  - Type: Gram Panchayat

Population (2001)
  - Total: 13,410

Languages
  - Official: Marathi
- Time zone: UTC+5:30 (IST)
- PIN: 412208
- Telephone code: 412208

Talegaon Dhamdhere is a panchayat village in the state of Maharashtra, India, on the right (south) bank of the Vel River (Wel River). Administratively, Talegaon Dhamdhere is under Shirur Taluka of Pune District in Maharashtra. There is only the single village of Talegaon Dhamdhere in the Talegaon Dhamdhere gram panchayat. The village of Talegaon Dhamdhere is 4 km by road southeast of the village of Shikrapur, and 6 km by road north of the village of Vittalwadi.

The main surnames of Talegaon Dhamdhere are:-Dhamdhere, Bhujbal, Hirave, Dhavale, Todkar, Pingle, Bhumkar, Narke etc.

== History ==
The town has several Peshwa period temples, the chief of which are five of Ganpati, Nath, Siddheshvar, Takleshvar, and Uttareshvar. Ganpati's temple was built by a member of the Dhamdhere family. Siddheshvar's is a large shrine built on raised ground and enclosed by lofty battlemented walls. High flights of steps lead on the east and west into the temple enclosure. The temple is said to have been built by a village accountant of Talegaon who rose to be Scindia's minister. Uttareshvar's temple was built by a member of a family called the Mahajan about 200 years ago.

== Demographics ==
In the 2001 census, the village of Talegaon Dhamdhere had 13,410 inhabitants, with 6,912 males (51.5%) and 6,498 females (48.5%), for a gender ratio of 940 females per thousand males.

== Gallery ==
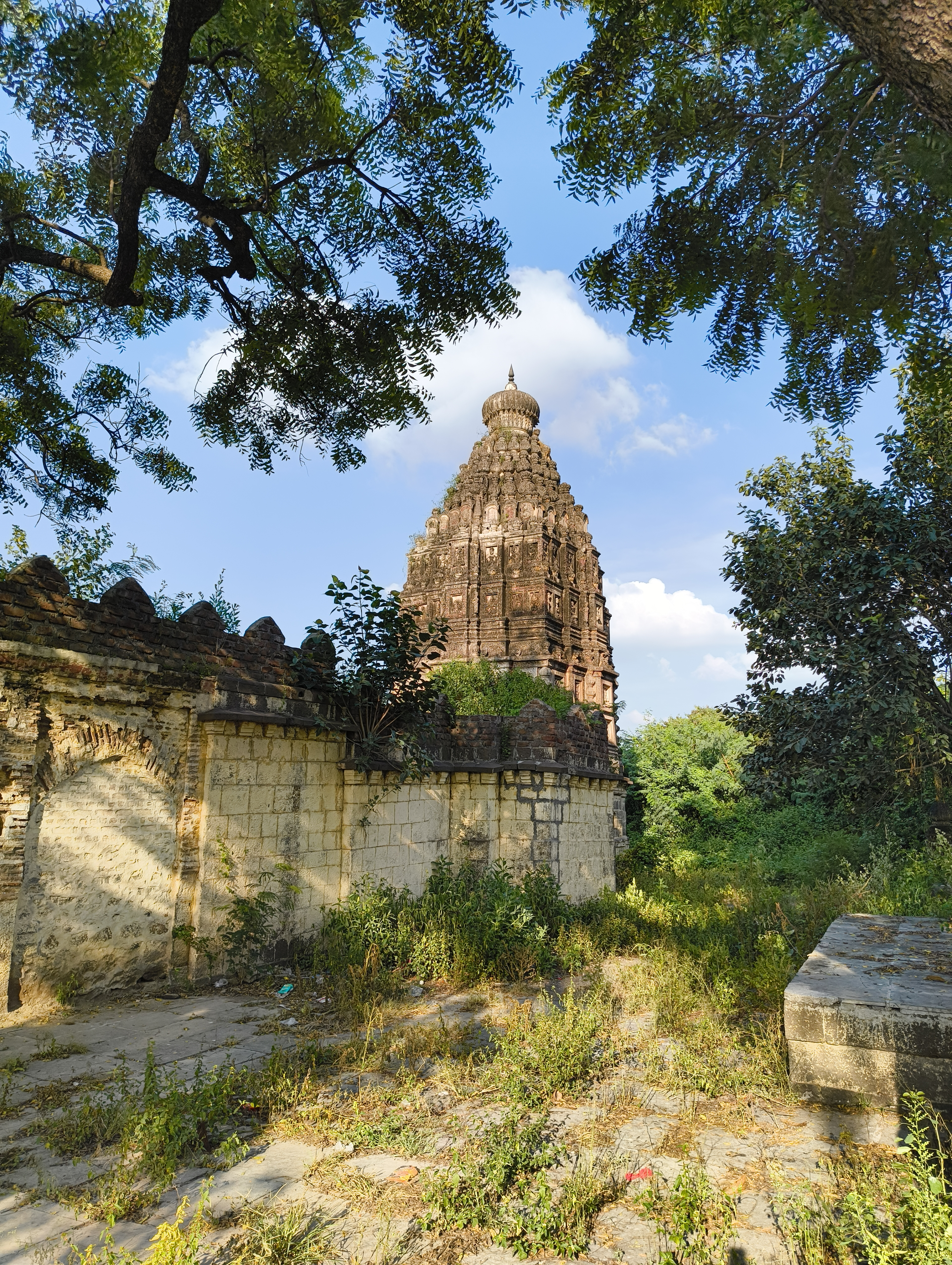
Shrine of Uttareshwar temple

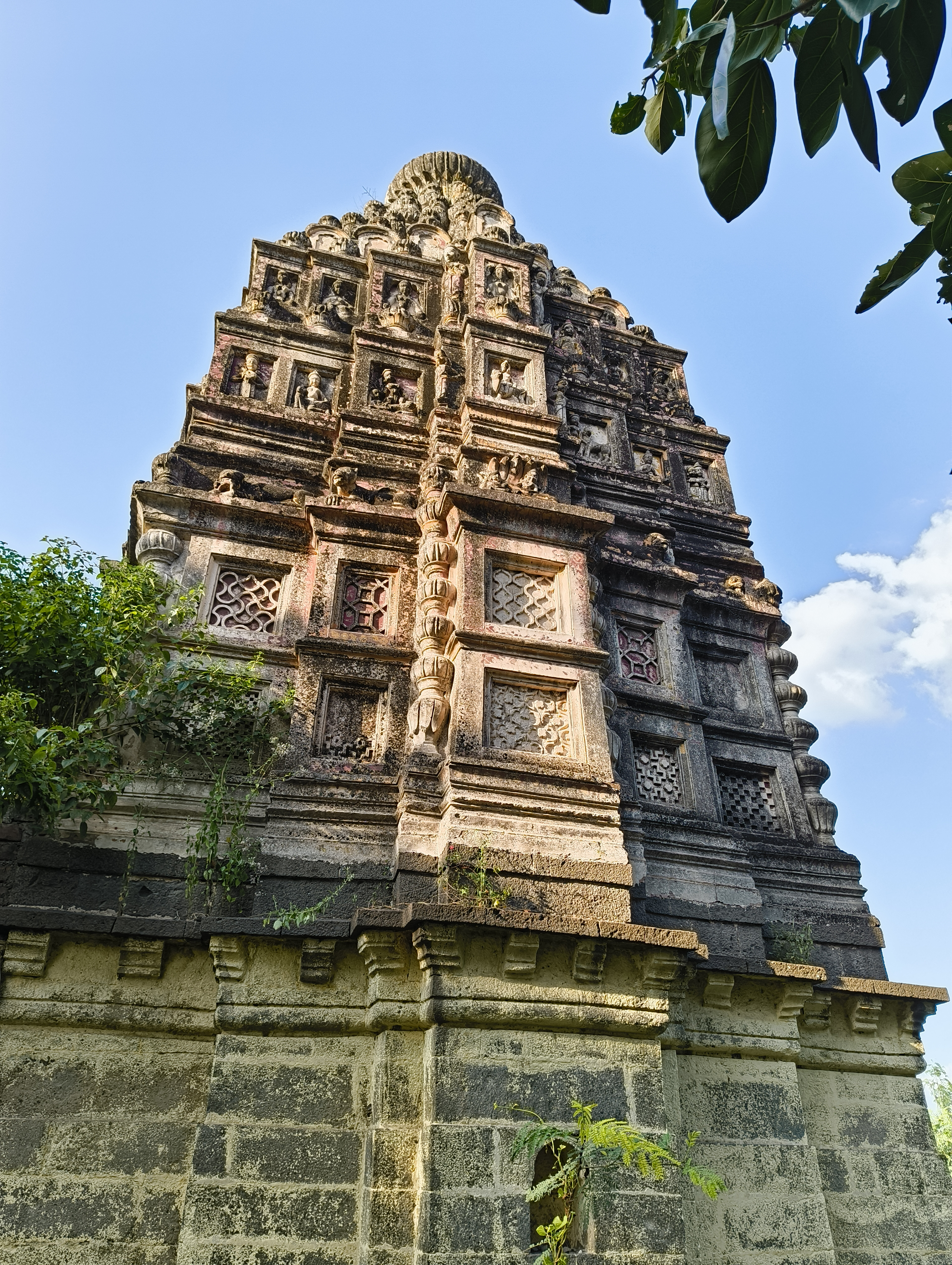
Shikhara of Uttareshwar temple

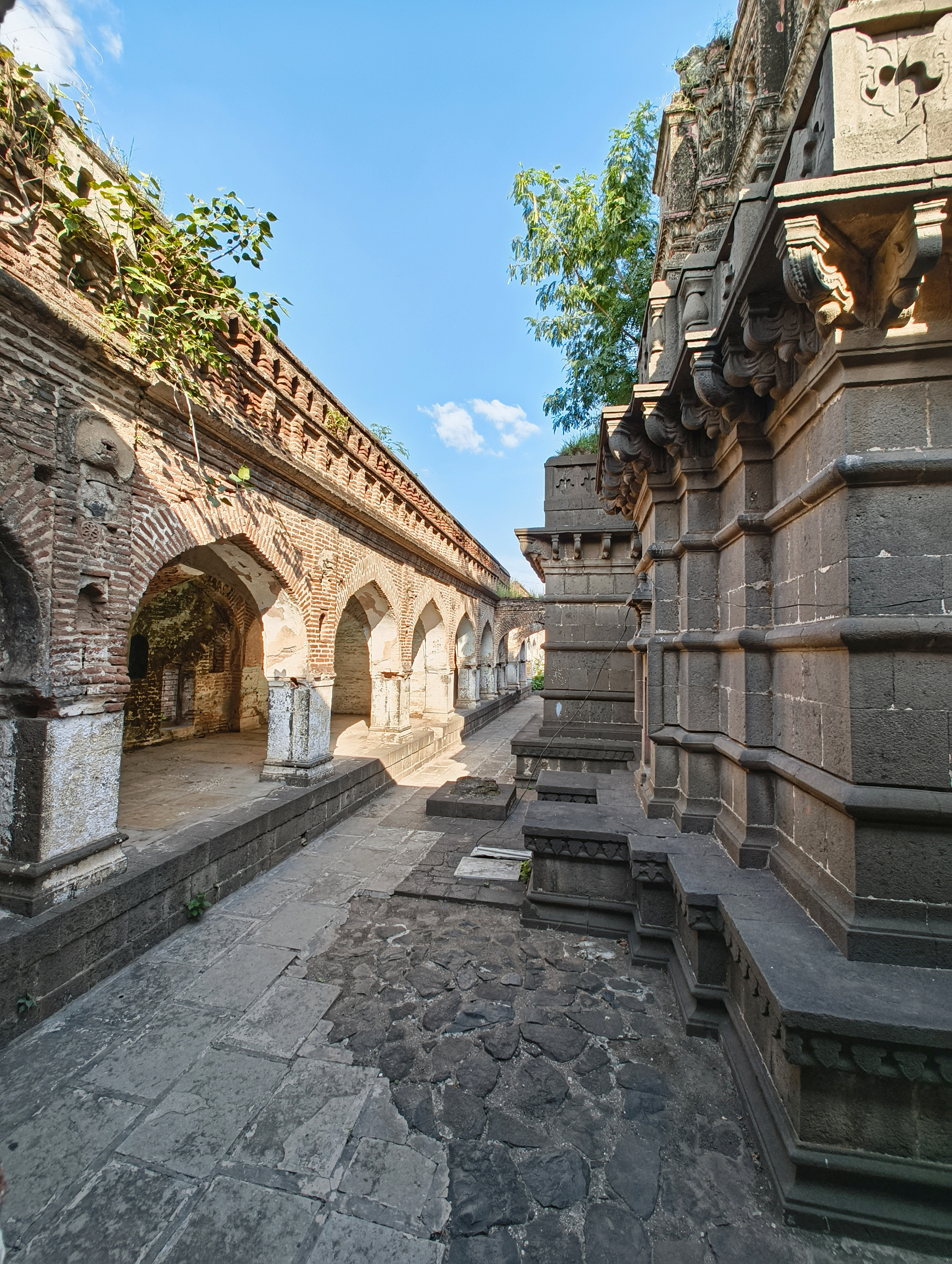
Arches & premises of Siddheshwar Temple

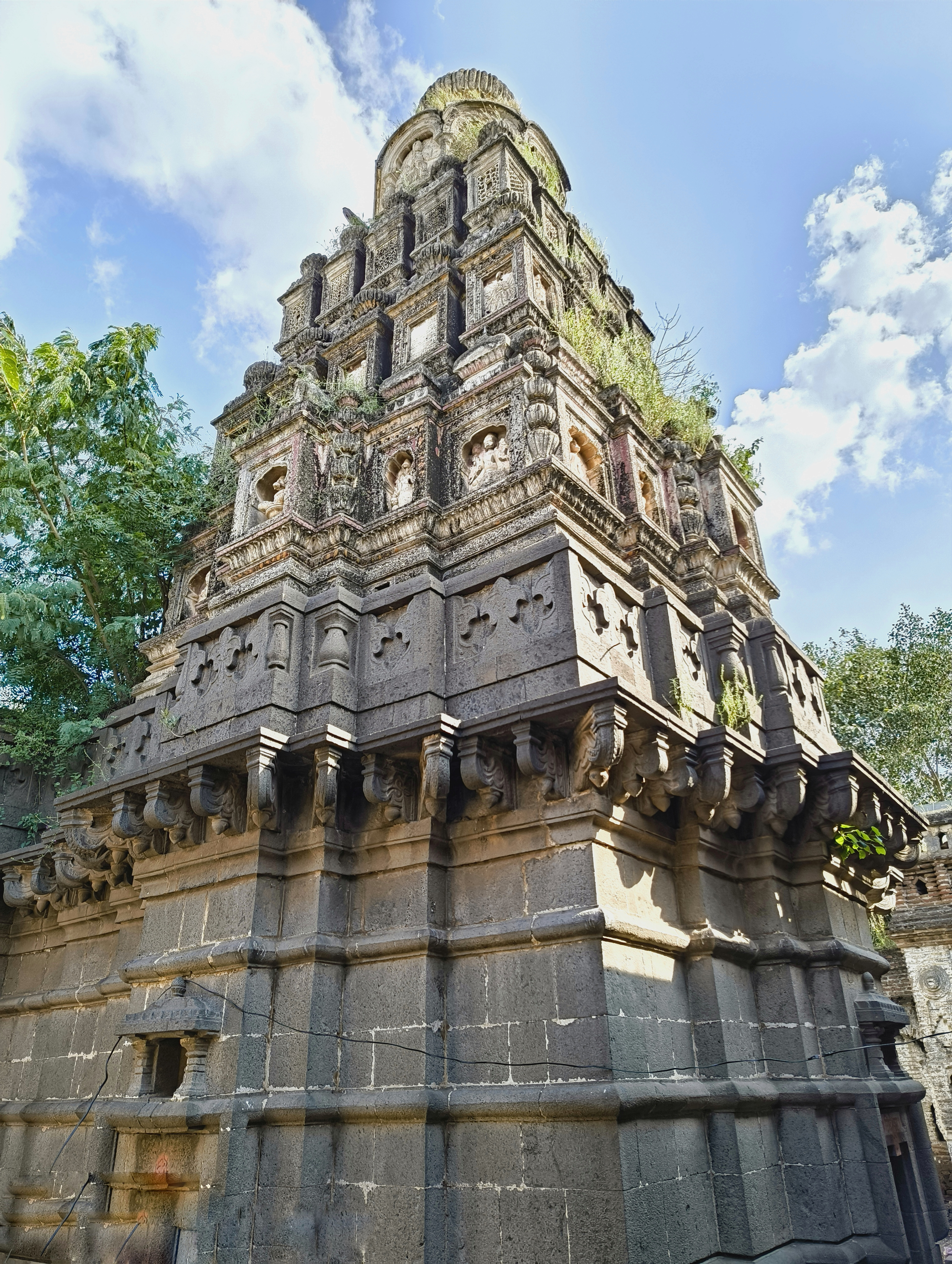
Shikhara-Siddheshwar temple

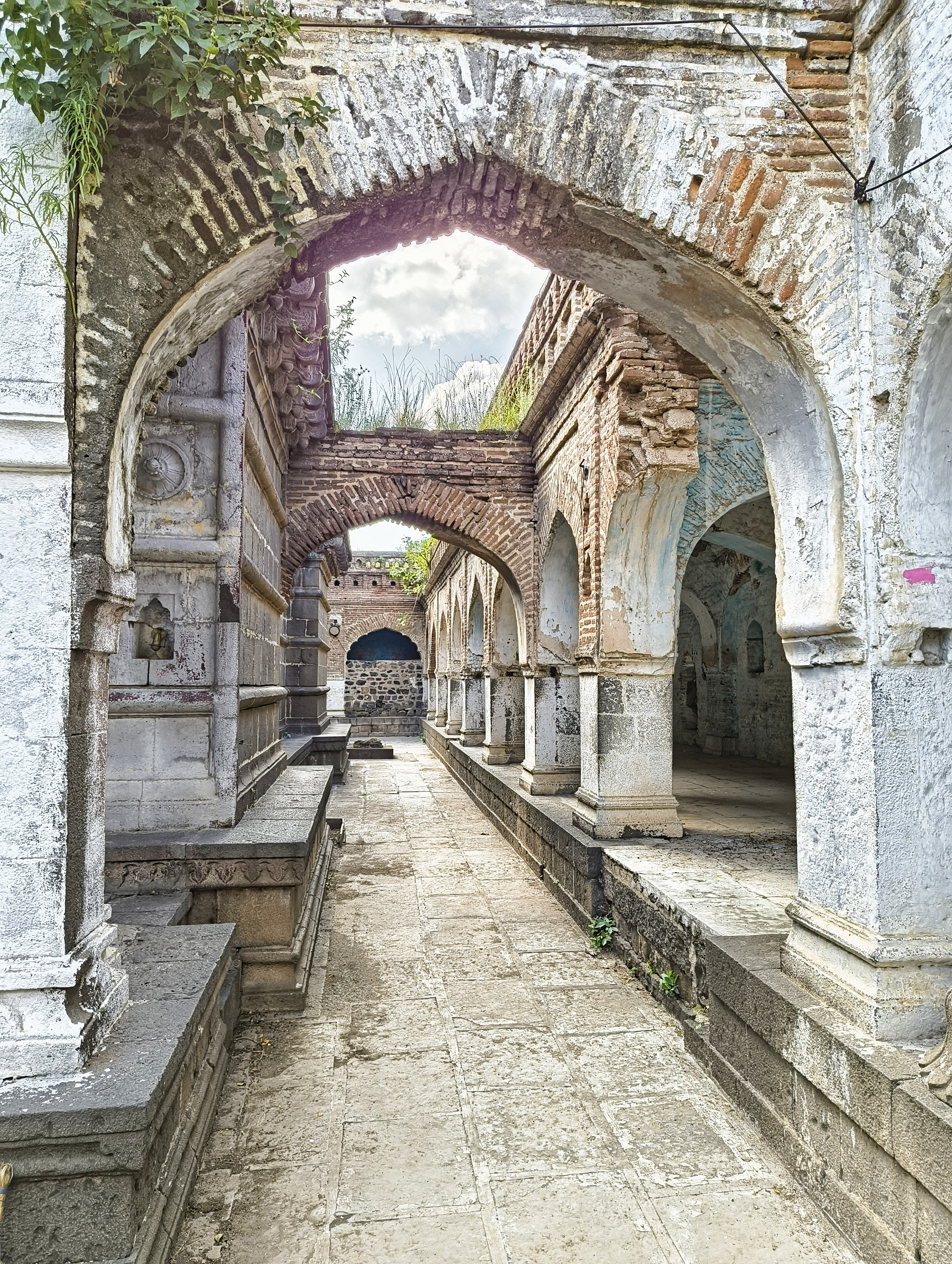
Arches - Siddheshwar temple

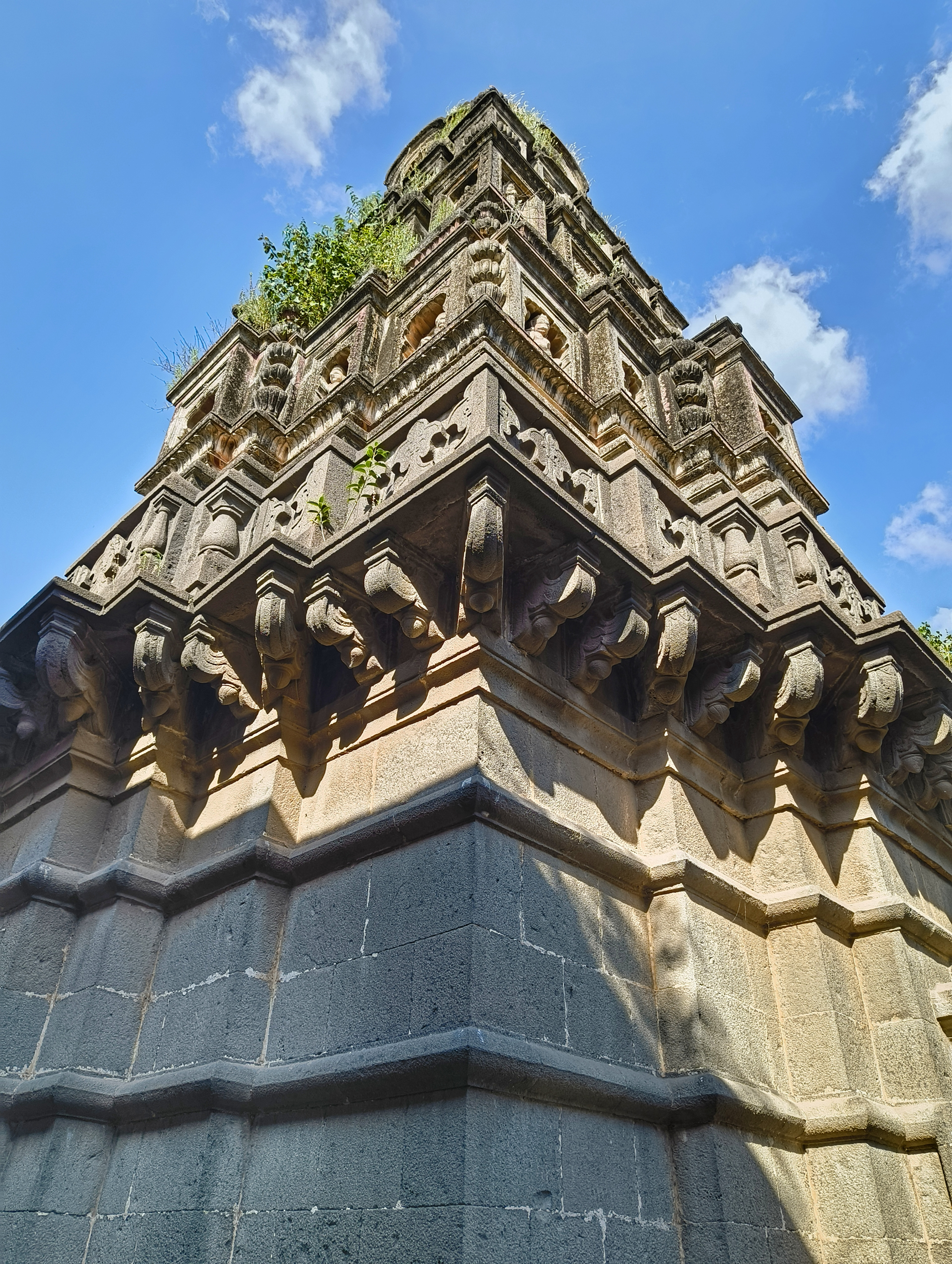
Roof support - Siddheshwar temple

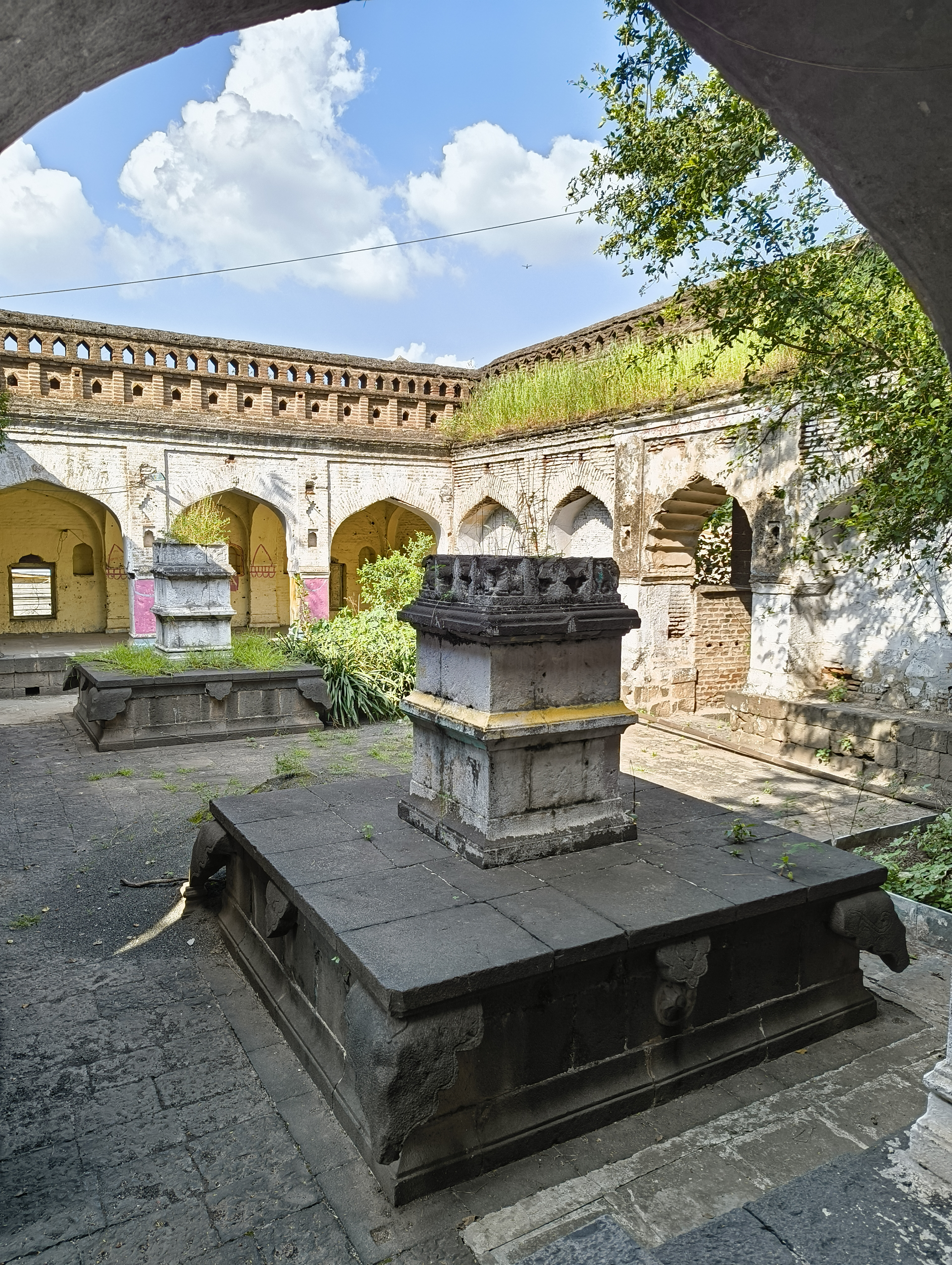
Tulasi Vrindavana in premises of Siddheshwar temple

== Notable people ==
=== Vishnu Ganesh Pingle (1888–1915) ===
Vishnu Ganesh Pingle was an Indian revolutionary and a key member of the Ghadar Party. Born on 2 January 1888 in Talegaon Dhamdhere, he pursued mechanical engineering at the University of Washington. Pingle played a significant role in the Ghadar Conspiracy during World War I and was executed on 16 November 1915 following the Lahore Conspiracy Trial. His legacy is commemorated with a memorial in his native village.

=== Hari Narke (1963–2023) ===
Hari Narke was a renowned scholar, author, and orator, born on 1 June 1963 in Talegaon Dhamdhere. He served as a professor and head of the Mahatma Jotirao Phule Chair at Savitribai Phule Pune University. Narke authored over 35 books focusing on social reformers and delivered numerous lectures globally. He died on 9 August 2023 in Mumbai.

=== Raikumar Bhogilal Gujar (1922–2010s) ===
Raikumar Bhogilal Gujar, born in 1922 in Talegaon Dhamdhere, was a freedom fighter who actively participated in the Quit India Movement of 1942 under Mahatma Gandhi's leadership. He later co-founded the Shikshan Prasarak Mandal’s Sahebrao Shankarrao Dhamdhere Arts & Commerce College, contributing significantly to education in the region.
