= G. N. Saibaba =

Indian activist and academic (1967–2024)

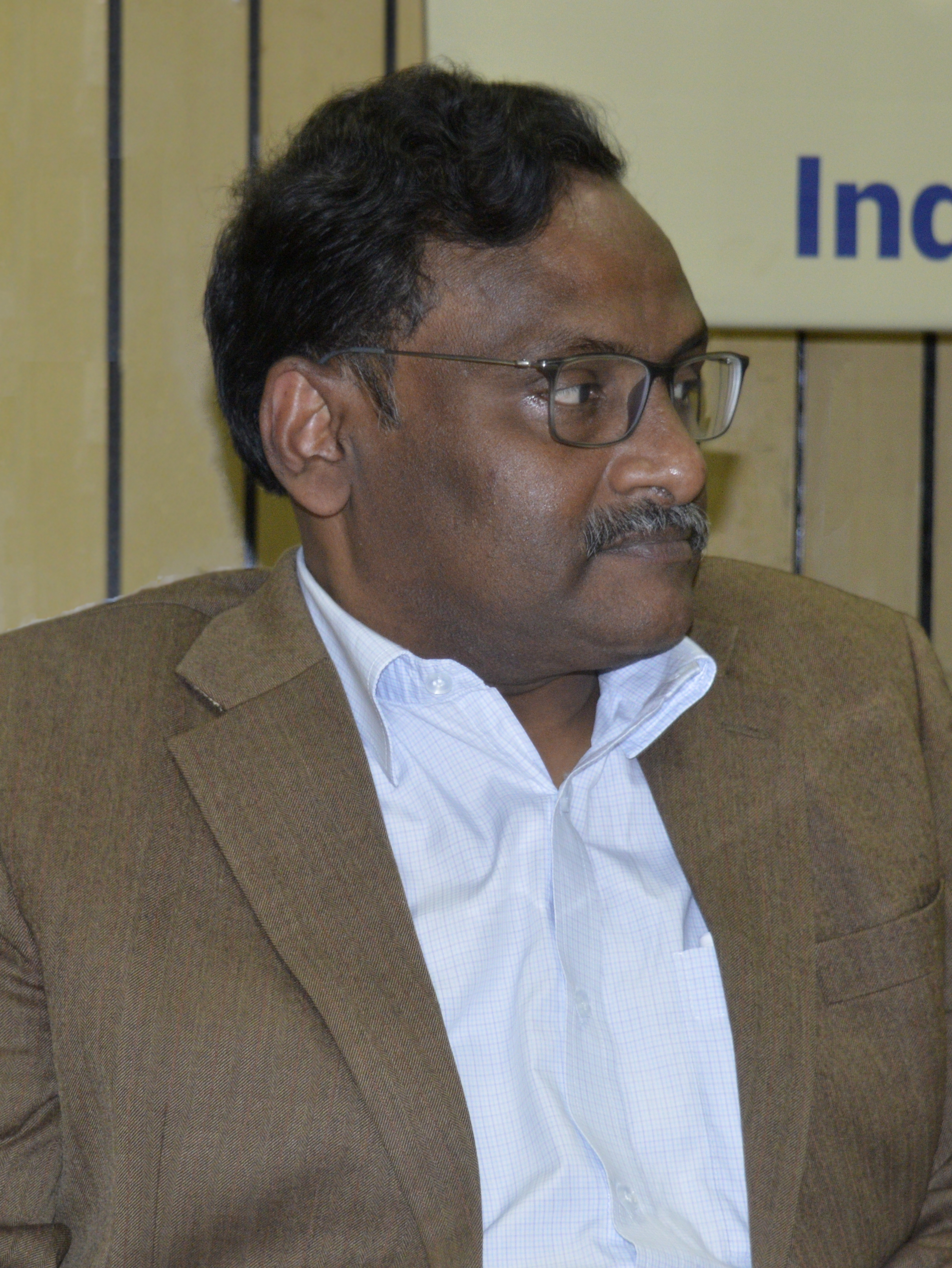
- Saibaba in 2017
- Born: Gokarakonda Naga Saibaba; 1967; Amalapuram, Andhra Pradesh, India
- Died: 12 October 2024 (aged 56–57); Hyderabad, Telangana, India
- Education: B.A. (Andhra); M.A. (Hyderabad); PhD (Delhi)
- Alma mater: Sree Konaseema Bhanoji Ramars College, Amalapuram (Andhra Pradesh), University of Hyderabad, Hyderabad (Telangana), University of Delhi, New Delhi
- Occupations: Teaching, writing
- Spouse: Smt. Vasantha Kumari
- Writing career
- Language: Telugu, English, Hindi
- Years active: 2003–2024
- Period: Twenty-first century
- Genres: Indian Writing in English
- Notable works: Saibaba, G. N. (2008). "Colonialist Nationalism in the Critical Practice of Indian Writing in English: A Critique". Economic and Political Weekly. 43 (23): 61–68.
- Movement: Human rights

Gokarakonda Naga Saibaba (1967 – 12 October 2024) was an Indian scholar, writer and human rights activist from Amalapuram, Andhra Pradesh.

Saibaba was accused by Indian authorities of having ties with outlawed Maoist organizations and was sentenced to life imprisonment by a session court in 2017. He was later acquitted of the charges under the Unlawful Activities (Prevention) Act by the Nagpur bench of the Bombay High Court on 14 October 2022.

After the ruling, the Supreme Court of India suspended the order and asked the high court to re-evaluate the case. On 5 March 2024, Saibaba (as well as five other individuals who were tried along with him) was once again acquitted by the High Court, with the court declaring that the prosecution's case was invalid due to its lack of technical propriety as well as various cases of dodgy evidence, and called the trial court's verdict a "failure of justice". The second acquittal has also been challenged by the state in the Supreme Court, by way of filing a special leave petition the same day and prior to the delivery of the High Court's judgement. He died on 12 October 2024, following post-operation complications after undergoing surgery for gallbladder stones.

== Early life and education ==
Saibaba was born in 1967 in Amalapuram, a town in East Godavari of the Indian state of Andhra Pradesh, in a poor peasant family. He used a wheelchair from the age of five due to polio.

Having studied at Sree Konaseema Bhanoji Ramars (SKBR) College in Amalapuram, he finished his degree at the top of the university. He obtained his M.A. in English from University of Hyderabad. In 2013, he completed his PhD dissertation which was awarded by Delhi University. His doctoral thesis was on Indian Writing in English and Nation Making: Reading the Discipline under guidance of Sumanyu Satpathy.

== Literary contribution ==
Saibaba's literary inspirations are Gurajada Apparao, Sri Sri, and the Kenyan Ngugi Wa Thiong'o. Saibaba's early works in Telugu were published in Srijana, an Indian magazine. These early articles focused on the dominant forms of knowledge that worked against Dalit and Adivasi participation in Indian literature.

=== Thesis ===
- Saibaba, G.N. (2011). "6". Indian Writing in English and Nation Making: Reading the Discipline (Ph.D. thesis). Delhi University. hdl:10603/382306.

=== Books ===
- Saibaba, G.N. (2022). Why do you fear my way so much?: poems and letters from prison. New Delhi: Speaking Tiger. p. 218. ISBN 9789354471643.
- Saibaba, G.N. (2019). నేను చావును నిరాకరిస్తున్నాను : సాయిబాబా అండాసెల్ కవిత్వం [I Refuse Death: Poetry of Saibaba from Anda cell] (in Telugu). Hyderabad: Revolutionary Writers Forum.

=== Articles ===
- Saibaba, G.N. (2018). "Brief aus dem Gefängnis von Nagpur" [Letter from Nagpur Jail]. Neue Rundschau (in German). 129 (1): 305–308.
- Saibaba, GN (2018). "Kiran Desai's The Inheritance of Loss: A cultural production of a "globalized world"". In Sharma, Vijay K; Tandon, Neeru (eds.). Kiran Desai and Her Fictional World. Atlantic. pp. 151–160. ISBN 9788126915149.
- Saibaba, G.N. (2016). "Struggle for Democratic Rights". Economic and Political Weekly. 51 (16): 4.
- Saibaba, G.N. (2016). "Struggle for Democratic Rights". Economic and Political Weekly. 51 (16): 4.
- Mishra H, Kurvatkar M, and Saibaba GN (2015). "Brutal assault on political prisoner-II". Economic and Political Weekly. 50 (14).
- Rao V, Mishra H, Kurvatkar M, and Saibaba GN (2015). "Brutal Assault on Political Prisoner". Economic and Political Weekly. 50 (14): 4–5.
- Rao, V.; Saibaba, G. N. (2014). "Telangana People's Leader". Economic and Political Weekly. 49 (2): 4–5.
- Rajkishore; Saibaba, G.N. (2011). "Attack on Prashant Bhushan". Economic and Political Weekly. 46 (43).
- IyerVRK, Sawant PB, Ghosh S, Bhaduri A, Devi M, Thapar R, Roy A, Sharma BD, Chakraborty B, Bandopadhyay D, Saibaba GN, Goswami J, Bhaduri M, Bhattacharyya A, Vijayan PK, Bhushan P, Singh R, Wilson R, Sanyal T (2010). "Hope of a Fresh Initiative". Economic and Political Weekly. 45 (21): 5.
- Goel R, Sharma HM, Saibaba GN, Singh V, Gabriel K, Kwatra K, Ara A, and Hanybabu MT (2009). "Of Reservations". Economic and Political Weekly. 44 (1): 4–74.
- Saibaba, G. N. (2008). "Colonialist Nationalism in the Critical Practice of Indian Writing in English: A Critique". Economic and Political Weekly. 43 (23): 61–68.
- Saibaba, G.N. (1997). "Fifty Years of Sham Independence". Economic and Political Weekly. 32 (31): 1938. ISSN 0012-9976. JSTOR 4405689.

== Career ==
Saibaba taught English at Ram Lal Anand College of Delhi University for several years. He received life imprisonment for his connections to Maoists and was removed from Assistant Professor post at Ram Lal Anand College of Delhi University in February 2021.

== Political activity and arrest ==
During the Mumbai Resistance 2004, a platform of over 310 political movements organised parallel to the World Social Forum, Saibaba participated as an active organiser. During this period he became a part of the International League of People's Struggle (ILPS).

In 2005, he joined the Revolutionary Democratic Front (RDF) which was banned in August 2012 by the AP government under Andhra Pradesh Public Security Act 1992 for alleged subversive activities.

In 2009, he was a prominent voice in the campaign against Operation Green Hunt, mainly the military actions perpetrated by the Indian state.

He was arrested in May 2014 for Maoist links. He was granted bail by Bombay High Court in June 2015 on medical grounds and he was released in July 2015. He was sent back to jail in December 2015 was released again in April 2016 after Supreme Court granted him bail.

He was sentenced to life imprisonment in March 2017 under Sections 13, 18, 20, 38 and 39 of the UAPA and Section 120 B of the Indian Penal Code for connections with the banned Revolutionary Democratic Front (RDF), an organisation linked with the banned CPI-Maoist. Saibaba denied the charge that organisation he ran was a front for CPI-Maoist.

The Maoist called for "Bharat Bandh" on 29 March 2017 to protest against Saibaba's life imprisonment with banners and pamphlets distributed by the CPI-Maoist at Maharashtra and Chhattisgarh region.

On 30 April 2020, a panel of experts with the United Nations OHCHR called on the Indian government urging the authorities to immediately release G.N. Saibaba, due to his "seriously deteriorating" health condition".

On 28 July 2020, the Bombay High Court rejected Saibaba's 45-day medical bail petition. He was denied permission to visit his 74-year-old mother who died of cancer, and was denied participation in funeral rituals after her death.

On 22 October 2020, Saibaba called off his hunger strike after his demands regarding CCTV cameras were accepted by the jail authorities.

In April 2021, he was terminated from Ram Lal Anand College of Delhi University. His professorship was then terminated as of July 2021.

In October 2022, Saibaba and five others were acquitted by a high court bench that set aside the life imprisonment sentence given to them in 2017. The bench concluded that the proceedings before the sessions court were "null and void" in the absence of a valid sanction under Unlawful Activities (Prevention) Act (UAPA). Discharging all five accused, Justice Deo had observed that the due process of law cannot be sacrificed at the altar of "perceived peril to national security". However, days after that the Supreme Court of India suspended his acquittal. The Supreme Court bench, consisting of Justice Bela Trivedi (who had earlier served as Gujrat state's Law Secretary during Narendra Modi's tenure as Chief Minister of Gujarat) and Justice M.R. Shah, had agreed to hear Maharashtra state's special leave petition on a Saturday (a court holiday) and stayed the HC acquittal. The Supreme Court found fault with the High Court's order and observed the High Court has not considered the incriminating material against him as well as the merits of the case.

In March 2024, the Nagpur Bench of the Bombay High Court once again acquitted G.N. Saibaba and all the other 5 accused (one of whom died from Swine flu during imprisonment), citing 'dodgy' evidence and lack of technical regularity during the prosecution. The state's counsel, in an exact replication of the 2022 proceedings, filed for another Special Leave Petition with the Supreme Court to stay the new HC order. Interestingly, the petition was filed before the Supreme Court even prior to the release of HC order, just as it was done in 2022.

== Illness and death ==
Saibaba suffered from several health problems while imprisoned and was 90% physically handicapped. During his ten-year incarceration, he had complained of the harrowing ill-treatment and torture meted out by jail authorities. He had told the media after his acquittal that though he had permanent polio-paralysis, the jail authorities had even refused to hand over his medication.

7 months after the acquittal, Saibaba died on 12 October 2024, whilst undergoing treatment at Nizam's Institute of Medical Sciences in Hyderabad. He was 57, and had been admitted ten days prior following post-operative complications after undergoing surgery for gallbladder stones. He was survived by his wife, Vasantha Kumari, and daughter, Manjeera.
