= Koregaon Bhima =

Village in Maharashtra

Koregaon Bhima Koregaon
- Village
- Location in Maharashtra, India Koregaon Bhima (India)
- Coordinates: 18°38′44″N 074°03′33″E
- Country: India
- State: Maharashtra
- District: Pune
- Taluka: Shirur

Government
  - Type: Panchayati raj (India)
  - Body: Gram panchayat

Area
  - Total: 20 km^{2} (7.7 sq mi)

Population (2011)
  - Total: 13,116
  - Density: 671/km^{2} (1,740/sq mi)

Languages
  - Official: Marathi
- Time zone: UTC+5:30 (IST)
- ISO 3166 code: IN-MH
- Website: pune.nic.in

Koregaon Bhima is a panchayat village and census town in the state of Maharashtra, India, on the left (north) bank of the Bhima River. Administratively, Koregaon Bhima is under Shirur Taluka of Pune District in Maharashtra. There is only the single town of Koregaon Bhima in the Koregaon Bhima gram panchayat. The town of Koregaon Bhima is 10 kms along the SH 60 motorway southwest of the village of Shikrapur, and 28 kms by road northeast of the city of Pune. It is the site of the Battle of Koregaon fought on 1 January 1818.

== History ==
The Battle of Koregaon took place on 1 January 1818 between the army of Peshwa Baji Rao II and an East India Company force, composed of mainly Mahars. The Peshwa, with some 28,000 troops encamped at Phulgaon nearby, dispatched about 2000 of his soldiers to attack the Company force of some 800. The Company troops successfully defended themselves against the attack, and the Peshwa withdrew at night fearing the arrival of a larger British force. After the British victory in the War, the Company commissioned a victory obelisk in Koregaon to commemorate its fallen soldiers. 22 of the 49 names of the slain soldiers on the pillar are that of Mahar caste. Today, the Mahars, who were formerly considered as untouchable, regard it as a symbol of their victory over the high-caste Peshwa, and gather in large numbers at the site on the anniversary of the battle.

This battle has attained legendary status in Dalit history. The Dalits who follow Dr BR Ambedkar view this battle as a victory of Mahars over the injustice and torture meted out to them by the Brahminical Peshwas.

== Demographics ==
In the 2001 census, the village of Koregaon Bhima had 8,999 inhabitants, with 5,178 males (57.5%) and 3,821 females (42.5%), for a gender ratio of 738 females per thousand males.
