= Battle of Koregaon =

1818 battle of the Third Anglo-Maratha War

- Part of Third Anglo-Maratha War
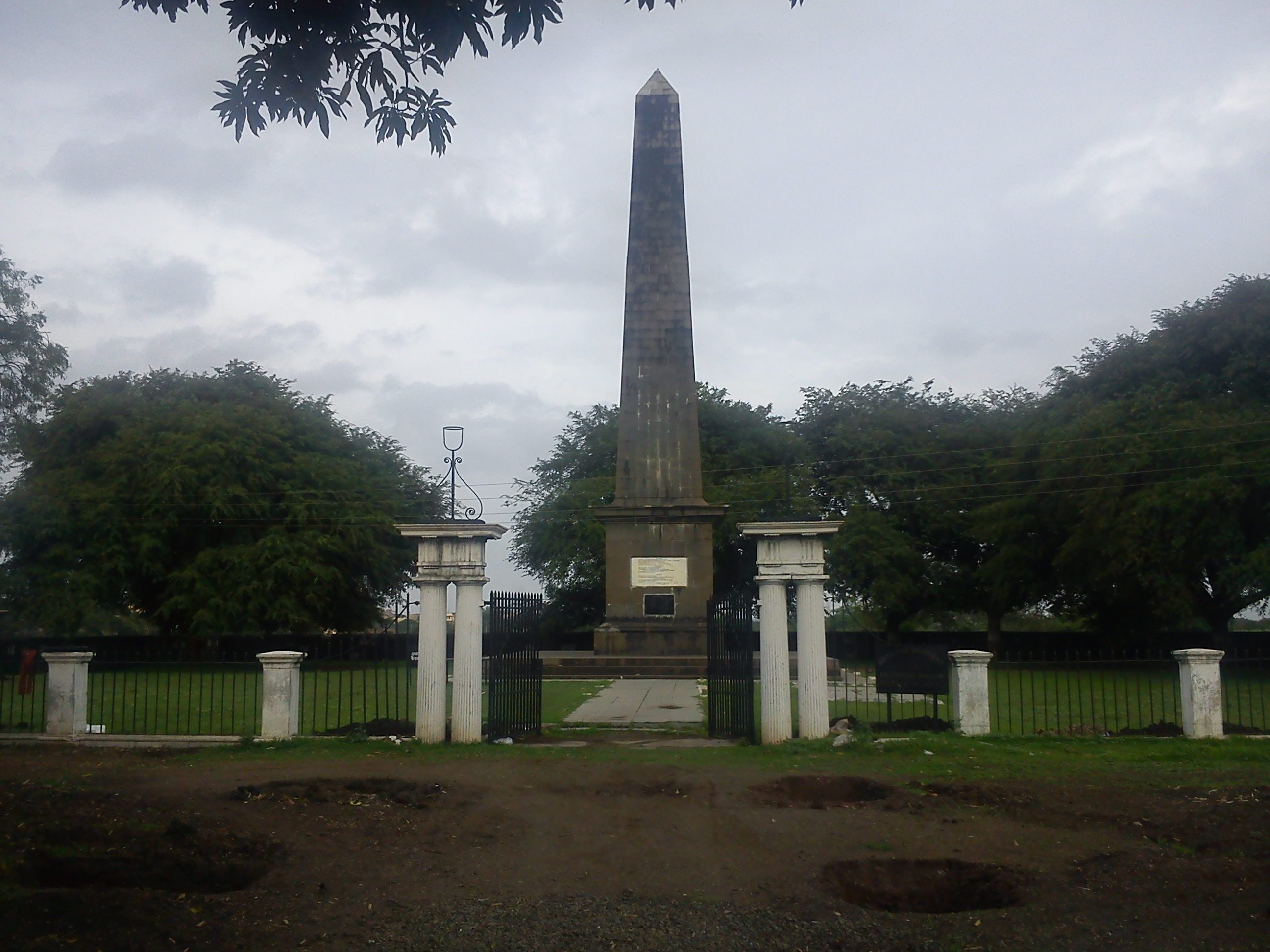
- Koregaon Bhima Victory Pillar
Date	1 January 1818
Location	Koregaon Bhima (in present-day Maharashtra, India) 18°38′44″N 074°03′33″E
Result	Inconclusive

Belligerents
East India Company	Peshwa faction, Maratha Confederacy

Commanders and leaders
Francis F. Staunton	Peshwa Baji Rao II; Bapu Gokhale; Appa Desai; Trimbakji Dengle

Units involved
Bombay Army: 2nd Battalion, 1st Regiment Bombay Native Infantry; Auxiliary Horse; Madras Artillery	Maratha Army: Arab Battalion; Gosain Battalion; Maratha Battalion

Strength
500 infantry 300 cavalry 24 artillerymen 2 6-pounder cannons	1800 infantry 2 cannons

Casualties and losses
275 killed, wounded or missing	500–600 killed or wounded (British estimates)
- Location of Koregaon Bhima in Maharashtra

The Battle of Koregaon was fought on 1 January 1818 between the East India Company and the Peshwa faction of the Maratha Empire, at Koregaon Bhima.

A 28,000-strong force led by Peshwa Baji Rao II whilst on their way to attack the company-held Pune, were unexpectedly met by an 800-strong Company force that was on its way to reinforce the British troops in Pune. The Peshwa dispatched around 2,000 soldiers to attack the force which sought entrenchment in Koregaon. Led by Captain Francis Staunton, the Company troops defended their position for nearly 12 hours, before the Peshwa's troops ultimately withdrew, fearing the imminent arrival of a larger British force.

The battle was part of the Third Anglo-Maratha War, a series of battles that culminated in the defeat of the Peshwa rule and subsequent rule of the British East India Company in nearly all of Western, Central and Southern India. There is a "victory pillar" (obelisk) in Koregaon commemorating the battle.

== Background ==
By the 1800s, the Marathas were organized into a loose confederacy, with the major constituents being the Peshwa of Pune, Scindiaof Gwalior,Holkar of Indore, Gaekwad of Baroda, and Bhosale of Nagpur. The British had subjugated and signed peace treaties with these factions, establishing Residencies at their capitals. The British intervened in a revenue-sharing dispute between the Peshwa and Gaekwad, and on 13 June 1817, the Company forced Peshwa Baji Rao II to sign an agreement renouncing claims on Gaekwad's revenues and ceding large swaths of territory to the British. This treaty of Pune formally ended the Peshwa's titular overlordship of other Maratha chiefs, thus officially ending the Maratha confederacy. Soon after this, the Peshwa burnt down the British Residency at Pune, but was defeated in the Battle of Khadki near Pune on 5 November 1817.

The Peshwa then fled to Satara, and the Company forces took complete control of Pune. Pune was placed under Colonel Charles Barton Burr, while a British force led by General Smith pursued Peshwa. Smith feared that Peshwa could escape to Konkan and overpower the small British detachment there. Therefore, he instructed Colonel Burr to send reinforcements to Konkan, and in turn, call in for reinforcements from Shirur, if needed. Meanwhile, the Peshwa managed to escape beyond Smith's pursuit, but his southward advance was constrained by the advance of a Company force led by General Theophilus Pritzler. He then changed his route, marching eastwards before turning north-west towards Nashik. Realizing that General Smith was in a position to intercept him, he suddenly turned southwards towards Pune. Towards the end of December, Colonel Burr received news that the Peshwa intended to attack Pune, and asked the Company troops stationed at Shirur for help. The troops dispatched from Shirur came across the Peshwa's forces, resulting in the Battle of Koregaon.

=== Peshwa's forces ===
The Peshwa's army comprised 20,000 cavalry and 8,000 infantry. Out of these, around 2,000 men were deployed in the action, constantly reinforced during the battle. The force that attacked the Company troops consisted of three infantry parties of 600 soldiers each. These soldiers included Arabs, Gosains and Marathas (the caste). The majority of the attackers were Arabs (mercenaries and their descendants), reputed to be the finest among the Peshwa's soldiers. The attackers were supported by a cavalry and two pieces of artillery.

The attack was directed by Bapu Gokhale, Appa Desai and Trimbakji Dengle. Trimbakji was the only among these to enter the Koregaon village, once during the attack. The Peshwa and other chiefs stayed at Phoolsheher (modern Phulgaon) near Koregaon. The titular Maratha Chhatrapati, Pratap Singh of Satara, also accompanied the Peshwa.

=== Company forces ===
The Company troops dispatched from Shirur comprised 834 men, including:

- 2nd Battalion, 1st Regiment Bombay Native Infantry—Around 500 soldiers led by Captain Francis Staunton. Other officers included:
  - Lieutenant and Adjutant Thomas Pattinson
  - Lieutenant Connellan
  - Lieutenant Jones, 10th Regiment
  - Assistant-Surgeon Wingate
- Auxiliary Horse—Around 300 under Lieutenant Swanston, Madras Establishment
- Madras Artillery—24 European and 4 Native, with two 6-pounder guns, led by Lieutenant Chisholm. Assistant-Surgeon Wyllie (or Wyldie) was the only other artillery officer.

The Company troops of Indian origin included Mahars, Marathas, Rajputs, Muslims, and Jews. This was mostly the troops that Capt. Staunton had raised three months ago with the object of strengthening the defense of Poona that was already under British control.

== The battle ==
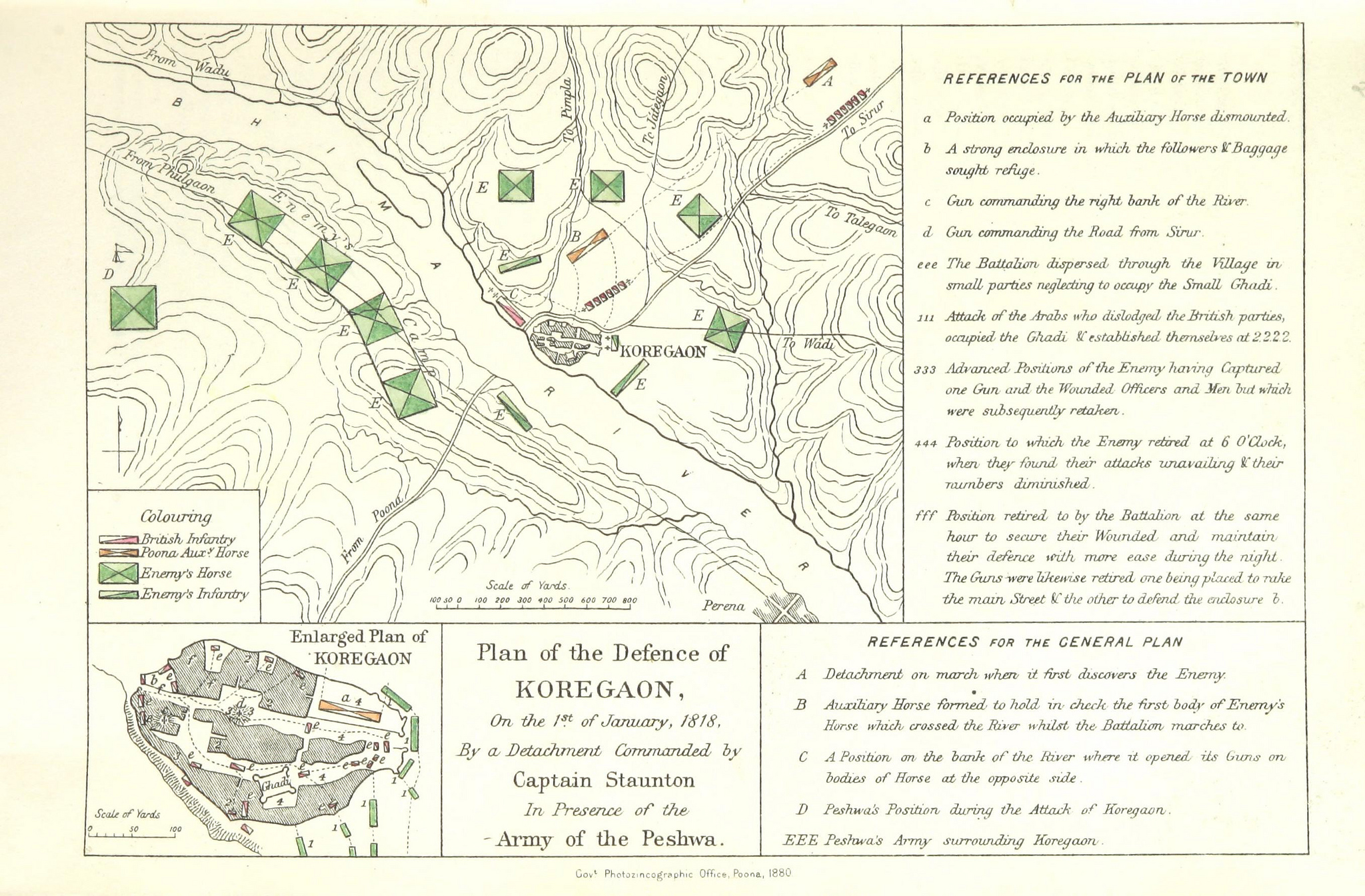
British defence plan during Battle of Koregaon

The Company troops left Shirur at 8 pm on 31 December 1817. After marching all night and covering a distance of 25 miles, they reached the high ground behind Talegaon Dhamdhere. From there, they spotted Peshwa's army across the Bhima River. Captain Staunton marched up to Koregaon Bhima village, which was located on the banks of the river. The village was surrounded by a low mud wall. Captain Staunton made a feint of crossing the shallow Bhima river. A 5,000-strong infantry, which was slightly ahead of the Peshwa's base, retreated to inform him about the presence of British forces. Meanwhile, Staunton stationed his forces in Koregaon instead of crossing the river. He secured a strong position for his guns, posting one of them to guard an approach from the Bhima river (which was running almost dry), and another to guard the road from Shirur.

After the return of his 5,000-strong infantry, the Peshwa dispatched three infantry parties of Arab, Gosain and Maratha soldiers. Each party comprised 300–600 soldiers. The parties crossed the Bhima River at three different points, supported by two cannons and rocket fire. Peshwa's troops also made a feint attack from the Shirur road.

By noon, the Arabs took control of a temple on the outskirts of the village. One of the temples was retaken by a party led by Lieutenant and Assistant Surgeon Wyllie. The Arabs also captured the sole gun guarding the river, and killed eleven gunners, including their officer Lieutenant Chisholm. Driven by thirst and hunger, some of the Company's gunners suggested negotiating a surrender. However, Captain Staunton refused to yield. A group led by Lieutenant Pattison retook the gun, and found Lieutenant Chisholm's body with the head cut off. Captain Staunton declared that this would be the fate of those who fall into the enemy hands. This encouraged the gunners to fight on. The Company troops successfully defended the village.

Peshwa's forces ceased firing and left the village by 9 pm, driven by the fear of approaching British reinforcements under General Joseph Smith. At night, the Company troops managed to procure a supply of water. The Peshwa remained near Koregaon on the next day but did not launch another attack. Captain Staunton, who was not aware of General Smith's advance, believed that the Peshwa would attack the Company troops on the Koregaon-Pune route. On the night of 2 January, Staunton first pretended to go in the direction of Pune but then marched back to Shirur, carrying most of his wounded soldiers.

According to the Interesting Intelligence from the London Gazette: "Accounts have been received from Lt Col Burr, dated the 3rd (January, 1818), intimating that Capt. Staunton, commanding the 2nd battalion 1st regiment of Bombay Native Infantry, had been fortunately able to commence his march back to Seroor, with 125 wounded, having buried 50 at Goregaum (sic), and left 12 or 15 there, badly wounded; that the Peshwa had proceeded Southward, General Smith in pursuit, which had probably saved the battalion."

== Casualties ==
Out of the 834 Company troops, 275 were killed, wounded or missing. The dead included two officers — Assistant-Surgeon Wingate and Lieutenant Chisholm; Lieutenant Pattison later died of his wounds in Shirur. Among the infantrymen, 50 were killed and 105 wounded. Among the artillery, 12 were killed and 8 were wounded. The dead Company soldiers of Indian origin included 22 Mahars, 16 Marathas, 8 Rajputs, 2 Muslims, and 1-2 Jews.

According to the British estimates, around 500 to 600 of Peshwa's soldiers were killed or wounded in the battle.

Mountstuart Elphinstone, who visited Koregaon two days later on 3 January 1818, wrote that the houses had been burned and the streets were filled with dead bodies of horses and men. There were around 50 dead bodies lying in the village, most of them of the Peshwa's Arab soldiers. There were six dead bodies outside the village. In addition, there were shallow graves of 50 native sepoys, 11 European soldiers and the 2 deceased officers belonging to the Company forces.

== Aftermath ==
When Mountstuart Elphinstone visited the battle field shortly after its completion, he found that the Company soldiers had completely lost their morale and were reluctant to believe the praises that were showered on them .

General Smith arrived in Koregaon Bhima on 3 January, but by this time, the Peshwa had already left the area. A company force led by General Pritzler pursued Peshwa, who tried to escape to Mysore. Meanwhile, General Smith captured Satara, the capital of Pratap Singh. Smith intercepted Peshwa in a battle on 19 February 1818 at Ashtoon (or Ashta); Bapuji Gokhale was killed in this action. The Peshwa then fled to Khandesh, while his jagirdars accepted the Company's suzerainty. A dejected Peshwa then met with John Malcolm on 2 June 1818, and surrendered his royal claims in exchange for a pension and a residence in Bithoor. Trimbakji Dengle was captured near Nashik and imprisoned at the Chunar Fort.

As a reward for their bravery in the Battle of Koregaon, the 2nd battalion of the 1st Regiment of the Bombay Native Infantry was made Grenadiers. Their regiment came to be known as 1st Grenadier Regiment of Bombay Native Infantry. The official report to the British Residents at Poona recalls the "heroic valour and enduring fortitude" of the soldiers, the "disciplined intrepidity" and "devoted courage and admirable consistency" of their actions.

Captain Staunton was appointed an honorary aide-de-camp to the Governor-General of India. The Court of Directors presented him with a sword and a sum of 500 guineas (gold coins). Later in 1823, he became a Major, and was appointed a companion of the Most Honourable Military Order of the Bath.

General Thomas Hislop called the battle "one of the most heroic and brilliant achievements ever recorded on the annals of the army". According to M.S. Naravane, "this gallant defense by a small number of Company's troops against an overwhelming Maratha force is rightly considered one of the most glorious examples of valour and fortitude in the annals of the Company's forces."

General Smith, in his official report of this battle, wrote, "The action at Koregaon was one of the most brilliant affairs achieved by any army in which European and Native soldiers displayed the most noble devotion and most romantic bravery under pressure of hunger and thirst almost beyond human endurance.

== Decisiveness ==
Neither side achieved a decisive victory in the battle. Shortly after the battle, Mountstuart Elphinstone described it as a "small victory" for the Peshwa. Nevertheless, the East India Company government praised the bravery of its troops, who could not be overpowered despite being outnumbered.

Notwithstanding this, the battle being one of the last ones to be fought in the Third Anglo-Maratha War, is since recognised as a Company victory after the war ended with Peshwa's defeat.

== Legacy ==
=== Memorial ===
To commemorate its fallen soldiers, the East India Company commissioned a "victory pillar" (an obelisk) in Koregaon. The inscription of the pillar declares that Captain Staunton's force "accomplished one of the proudest triumphs of the British Army in the East."

=== Significance to Mahars ===
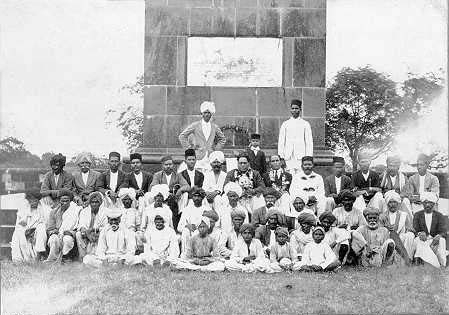
B. R. Ambedkar and his followers at the Koregaon victory pillar on 28 December 1927

The Koregaon pillar inscription features the names of the 49 Company soldiers killed in the battle. 22 of these names end with the suffix -nac (or -nak), which was used exclusively by the people of Mahar caste. The obelisk was featured on the Mahar Regiment's crest until Indian Independence. While it was built by the British as a symbol of their own power, today it serves as a memorial of the Mahars.

The Mahars were considered untouchable in the contemporary caste-based society. The Peshwas, who were the 'high-caste' Brahmins, were notorious for their mistreatment and persecution of the untouchables. Because of this, the Dalits (former untouchables), after independence, saw the Koregaon obelisk as a symbol of their victory over the high-caste oppression. Dalit leader B. R. Ambedkar visited the site on 1 January 1927. To commemorate his visit to the site, now thousands of his followers visit the site every New Year's Day. A number of Mahar gatherings have also been held at the place.

On 1 January 2018, clashes erupted between Hindu groups and Dalit Buddhist groups during the commemoration of this battle. This led to further violent protests and rioting in Mumbai and Maharashtra for two days.

=== Films ===
The Battle of Bhima Koregaon: An Unending Journey is a 2017 documentary by Indian filmmaker Somnath Waghmare. It explored the role of 500 Mahar soldiers in Battle of Koregaon on 1 January 1818 against the Peshwa dynasty.

The Battle of Bhima Koregaon is an upcoming Indian Hindi-language period war drama film directed and produced by Ramesh Thete under his banner Ramesh Thete Films. The film stars Arjun Rampal as the Mahar warrior Sidhnak, and Digangana Suryavanshi.

== See also ==
- Battle of Saragarhi
- Mahar Regiment
