= Arun Ferreira =

Activist, lawyer

Arun Ferreira is an Indian activist who was arrested in 2007 for alleged links to the Naxalite movement and spent five years in prison before being acquitted in 2012. He began his career as a criminal lawyer, defending political prisoners. He was arrested again in August 2018 and is currently lodged in Taloja prison, along with others accused of the 2018 Bhima Koregaon violence

== Early life ==
Ferreira’s career and interests in social activism were strongly influenced by his close relationship with his family, specifically his uncle, Father Raymond D’Silva, who was also a liberation theologist. As a member of the All-India Catholic University Students' Association, he began to explore the strong social sinfulness of the millions of impoverished people and why there is so much poverty while at the same time india is abundant in resources. D’Silva taught many Catholic youths about the strong social imbalances between the wealthy, and the impoverished. Ferreira was raised hearing about the unequal distribution of resources and the rich who always remained in control.

Ferreira’s attended St Xaviers College in early 1990s and as a student, he took a large part in an organization called Cheshire home, assisting in reading to blind children and orphans.. Arun also became interested in liberation theology, and then grew to express his thoughts about liberation overpowering theology, and soon adopted a more radical view of politics and the rights that human beings should be given and graduated in 1993 from St. Xavier.

After graduating, Ferreira worked in favor of the slum-dwellers and squatters of Mumbai, where he became involved in helping slum rehabilitation at Dindoshi where he worked for the relocation of slums from Colaba to Goregaon.

== Education ==
Ferreira attended St Xaviers College in Mumbai. During his time there, he was known to aid the annual blood donation drive by sketching caricatures for those who donated blood.

From 2014 to 2016, he attended Siddharth Law College and received his degree in law.

== Work ==
As reported by the Chandrapur superintendent of police, Cherring Dorje, Ferreira used to run a government banned organisation named Vidyarthi Pragati Sangathana in Mumbai. The Vidyarthi Pragati Sanghatana is a student organisation that took many struggles and campaigns for the rights of students and other oppressed sections. With his VPS comrades, Arun Ferreira hoped to transform a class- and caste-ridden country into a more just and equitable one. He was a big part of the organisation’s decision-making process, fighting for the democratisation of student councils in the various colleges, cultivating student-worker and student-peasant solidarity, the latter, buttressed by its “go-to-the-village”campaigns.

He moved to Chandrapur in 2001 until 2006 when along with Arun Bhelke, he started the Deshbhakti Yuva Manch to recruit more youths for the banned outfit, Communist Party of India (Maoist). Arun was horrified at the brutal killings of four members of a dalit family on September 29, 2006 in Khairlanji village (Bhandara district) and the police and government’s attempt at a coverup. Arun was active in the post-Khairlanji protests — the protesters’ endeavour was to hasten the emergence of an uncompromising leadership among the dalits, and to find support for the dalit cause among the underprivileged kunbis, marathas and “other backward classes”. He was also organising students in Chandrapur, some of whom (of the Deshbakth Yuva Sanghatan) have since been persecuted by the police.

He was arrested in his late 30s on May 8, 2007 under the Unlawful Activities (Prevention) Act (UAPA) on charges of sedition and spent four years and eight months at the Nagpur jail. Here he began to draw and these sketches marked the beginning of Ferreira’s book Colours of the Cage (Aleph).

In 2008, Arun Ferreira started a hunger strike along with other imprisoned activists. Over the course of his sentence, Arun Ferreira had 11 cases filed against him under the UAPA and the Arms Act.

After his acquittal in 2011, Ferreira completed his degree from Siddharth Law College and began working as a lawyer in December 2016. He then became a part of the ‘Indian Association of People’s Lawyers’ and the ‘Committee for Protection of Democratic Rights’. IAPL was created to gather lawyers involved in the legal support of collective struggles for people’s rights and in situations of gross rights violations. The main objective of the CPDR has been to educate people on their democratic rights as provided in the Constitution of India and struggle against violation of civil rights by the state as well as civil society elements. Arun Ferreira carried out social work with an NGO, Naujawan Bharat Sabha, which was a left-wing Indian association that sought to foment revolution against the British Raj, (the rule by the British Crown in the Indian subcontinent), by gathering together worker and peasant youths. This social work was deemed “covert Naxalite activity” which was cause for more charges. Arun works to protect rights of minorities and is critical of the Indian Prime Minister, Narendra Modi. Arun stated in a 2015 interview that there has been in increase in attacks on Christians and Muslims since Modi came to power. He believes the government is responsible for anti-minority propaganda and stirring feelings of hate towards minorities.

== Arrests ==
=== 2007 arrest and imprisonment ===
Ferreira was arrested under the Unlawful Activities (Prevention) Act, and imprisoned in 2007. He spent four years and eight months in Nagpur jail as a political under trial. He was kept in solitary confinement. During this time, he took up cartooning again. All of his charges were dropped in September 2011 only for him to be arrested again in 2012. He was released on 4 January 2012 with the dropping of all his charges. His lawyer at the time was Surendra Gadling.

On his release, he published a book on his experiences in prison, titled Colours of the Cage. In his book, he detailed his own experiences of torture and solitude, the life of prisoners, and the policies that govern them. In his memoir, he recounted many instances of the harsh nature of the Nagpur jail and the harsh questioning tactics used by the police. While Ferreira was being questioned, not only was he interrogated by the local Nagpur police, he was questions by officers from the Anti-Naxal cell he was placed in along with the Anti-Terrorism Squad, the Intelligence Bureau and even the Special Intelligence Bureau of Andhra Pradesh. He was interrogated for ten days. After all preliminary interrogation techniques failed, he was transported to a Hospital where the government authorized sodium pentothal to be used for Ferreira’s narco-analysis where he was questioned while under the influence of the drug. This ensured that the forensic scientists and psychologists could get true answers about Ferreira’s background as an activist. While in jail, the Nagpur Police continued to carry out searches in Ferreira’s residence and spread the news that he was a high-ranking leader of the banned Communist Party of India and he was responsible for spreading violence around the country. Ferreira denies any news about spreading violence and harming citizens. On 29 January 2014, he was acquitted of all charges .

=== 2018 arrest ===
In August 2018, Ferreira was again arrested for connections to organizing “Elgaar Parishad”, an event that marks the 200th year of the Battle of Bhima Koregaon on January 1, 2018. The Battle of Bhima Koregaon is controversial in India with right-wing groups claiming that it was a battle between British and Indian rulers and left-wing groups claiming that the battle was a victory against caste-based oppression. The event was violent and allegedly, the police had uncovered a letter that included plans to assassinate the Prime Minister. Currently, Ferreira is under house arrest with policeman posted in his complex after the Supreme Court intervened in the arrest. His arrest was part of a multi-city operation by the Pune Police, in which they also arrested Sudha Bharadwaj, Varavara Rao, Vernon Gonsalves and Gautam Navlakha, and raided the residences of Anand Teltumbde, Fr Stan Lourduswamy SJ and K. Satyanarayana.

== See also ==
- Fr Stan Lourduswamy SJ
