= Bhardwaj =

Bhardwaj is a surname used by Brahmins relating to the lineage of Bharadwaja and the caste of Vishwabrahmins in India.

== Notable people ==
Notable people with the surname include:

=== Sports ===
- Anil Bhardwaj (cricketer) (born 1954), Indian cricketer
- B. M. Rahul Bharadwaj (born 2000), Indian badminton player
- Manu Bhardwaj, Indian cricketer
- Mohini Bhardwaj (born 1978), American gymnast
- Kirpal Singh Bhardwaj (born 1935), Sikh Kenyan field hockey player
- Om Prakash Bhardwaj, Indian boxing coach
- Ravi Bharadwaj (born 1992), Indian basketball player
- Shapath Bharadwaj (born 2002), Indian sport shooter
- Vijay Bharadwaj (born 1975), Indian cricketer

=== Entertainers ===
- Anasuya Bharadwaj (born 1982), Indian television presenter and actress
- Ankit Bhardwaj, Indian film and television actor
- Hetu Bhardwaj, Indian writer
- Hitesh Bharadwaj (born 1991), Indian television actor, model, and anchor
- Janani Bharadwaj (born 1989), Indian playback singer
- Krishna Bharadwaj (actor) (born 1989), Indian television actor
- Lavanya Bhardwaj, Indian actor and model
- Musafir Ram Bhardwaj, Indian musician
- Nitish Bharadwaj (born 1963), Indian television and film actor, director, screenwriter, producer, veterinarian and politician
- Radha Bharadwaj, Indian filmmaker, film producer and screenwriter
- Bharadwaj (composer) (born 1960), Indian music director, composer, singer-songwriter, and music producer, born Ramani Bharadwaj
- Reena Bhardwaj, British singer
- Rekha Bhardwaj, Indian singer
- Shweta Bhardwaj, Indian actress
- Sumit Bhardwaj (born 1992), Indian actor
- Vedanth Bharadwaj (born 1980), Indian vocalist and composer
- Vishal Bhardwaj (born 1965), Indian film director and musician
- Vinay Bharadwaj (born 1983), Indian-Singapore-based ex-banker, filmmaker, television host
- Vishal Bharadwaj (born 1965), Indian film director, screenwriter, producer, music composer and playback singer

=== Politicians ===
- Abhay Bharadwaj (1954–2020), Indian advocate turned politician
- Deepak Bharadwaj (1950–2013), Indian politician
- H. R. Bhardwaj (1939–2020), Indian politician
- Jagannath Bharadwaj (1916–1987), Indian politician
- Naresh Bhardwaj (born 1959), Canadian politician
- Ram Chandra Bharadwaj (died 1918), Indian politician
- Saurabh Bhardwaj (born 1979), Indian politician
- Suresh Bharadwaj (born 1952), Indian politician

=== Others ===
- Anita Bharadwaj, Indian high altitude rescue doctor
- Babu Bharadwaj (1948–2016), Indian writer in Malayalam-language
- Chaitan Bharadwaj (born 1988), Indian music composer
- Girish Bharadwaj (born 1950), Indian social worker
- Krishna Bharadwaj (economist) (1935–1992), Indian Neo-Ricardian economist
- Raman Bhardwaj, Scottish broadcast journalist
- Somnath Bharadwaj (born 1964), Indian theoretical physicist
- Sudha Bharadwaj (born 1961), Indian trade-unionist, activist and lawyer
