= Operation Lalgarh =

2009 Indian anti-Maoist insurgency operation

- Part of Naxalite–Maoist insurgency
| Date | 17 - 29 June 2009 |
| Location | Lalghar, Jhargram subdivision of Paschim Medinipur district (now Jhargram district) 22.58°N 87.05°E |
- Location of Lalghar

Operation Lalgarh was an armed operation in India against the Maoists who have been active in organising an armed tribal movement alongside a group called the People's Committee Against Police Atrocities (PCAPA). The operation is organised by the police and security forces in Lalgarh, Jhargram, West Bengal to restore law and order in the area and flush out the Maoists. The area of operation is said to be expanded to 18 police stations in the three Maoist-affected districts of Paschim Medinipur (including newly split Jhargram), Bankura and Purulia.

== Background ==
The incident has its root in an incident on 2 November 2008. On the way back from laying the foundation stone of Jindal steel plant at Salboni, the convoy of the chief minister of West Bengal Buddhadeb Bhattacharya and then central ministers Ram Vilas Paswan and Jitin Prasada came under a landmine attack by the Maoists. Though the ministers were unharmed, it hit a police jeep in the convoy and six policemen were grievously injured. The CPI (Maoist) in a press release accepted the responsibility of the explosion and stated clearly that they were opposed to the steel plant on tribal land and that the target of the explosion was Buddhadeb Bhattacharya. In the aftermath of the assassination attempt, the West Bengal Police carried out raids across the Lalgarh area. Due to the influence by ruling party CPI (Marxist), the police atrocities, indiscriminate raids and brutal beatings, resulting in serious injuries to many people, mainly women. People have been subjected to beatings, torture, molestation of women and false cases.

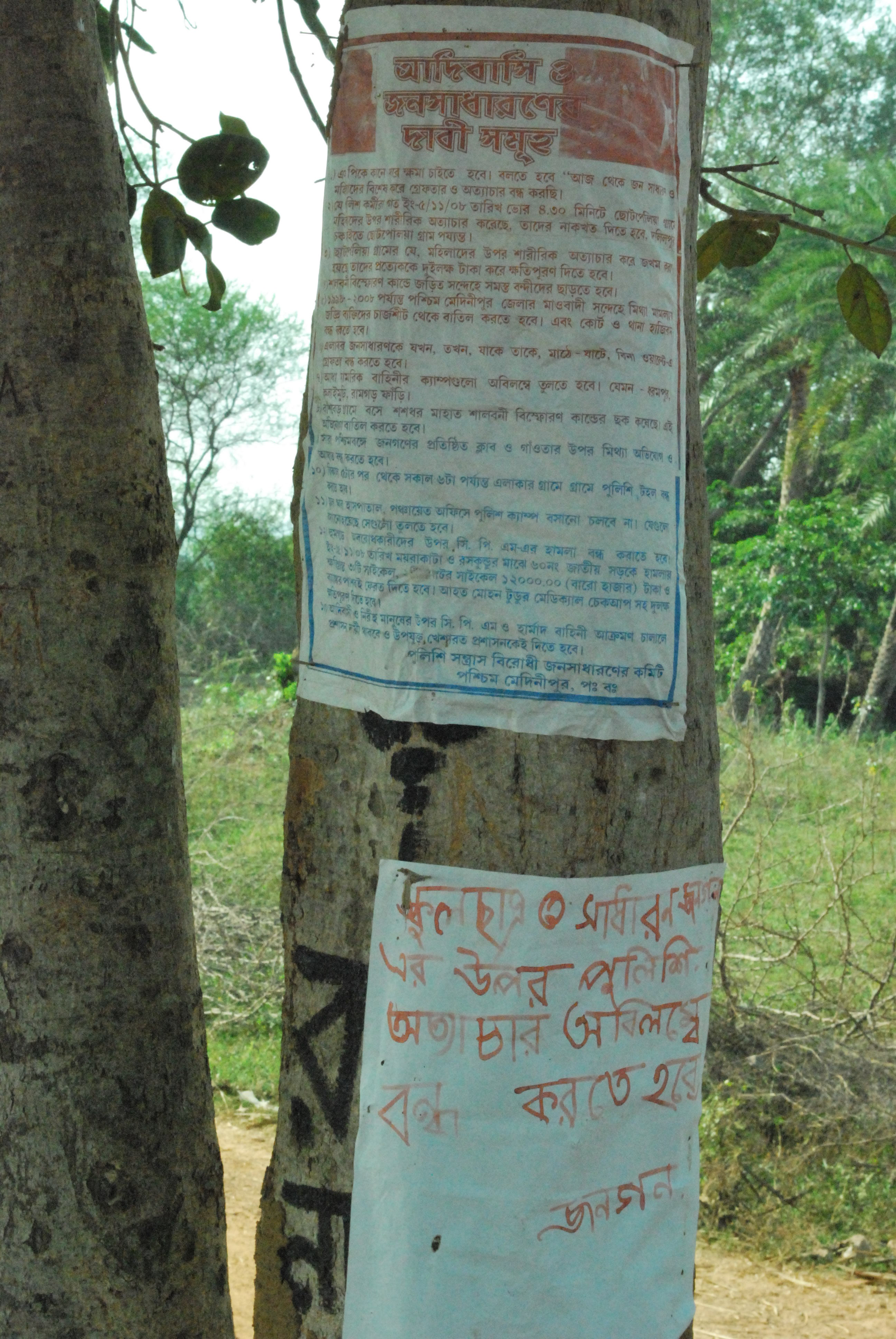
The leaflet printed and put up by The People's Committee Against Police Atrocities, West Midnapore, West Bengal.

The locals allege that Lalgarh police station has long been torturing and detaining adivasis at the smallest pretext on basis of speculation. On 4 November 2008 evening, three boys all studying in high school between standards 8 and 10, were going to their homes in Bashber Village on foot. They were returning from Katapahari, where a program of Baul Song was going on. On the way they were picked up by Lalgarh police for being suspected Maoists The villagers were enraged in the incident and surrounded the Lalgarh police station and blockades were made on several roads by felling trees and digging the roads. Later they formed a committee named Police Santras Birodhi Janosadharan Committee (transl. People's Committee against Police Atrocities) which demanded on thirteen issues and put up posters to publicise the same. The major demands include the Superintendent of Police of Paschim Medinipur district has to hold his ears and ask for forgiveness and he has to say 'Form now onwards I will stop illegally arresting the people and especially women' and release of those illegally arrested and cases has to be dropped against them. Some of the demands of the committee were met and cases against those children arrested were dropped. In turn the Committee removed some of the blockades, though police were not allowed to patrol the area. The Maoists congratulated the people of Lalgarh for their protest, but stopped short of claiming the movement to be under their control. The people of Lalgarh however continually maintained that their movement was peaceful and for demand of basic democratic rights.

Adivasis of these areas were demanding development measures such as health centres, schools and roads and the basic means for survival, such as proper prices for forest produce such as the Tendu leaves and Babui grass, and an end to harassment by forest officials and timber mafias. These demands drew the ire of the state, which led to the set up of the Police Santras Birodhi Janaganer Committee (PSBJC) (transl. People's Committee Against Police Atrocities) by Sri Chhatradhar Mahata.

=== The movement ===
==== The beginning ====
The police quickly understood the extent of mobilization that the adivasis have made and started making false promises about the imminent release of those arrested including the 3 school students. The police thought of buying some time with these lies, hoping that the mass will disperse with time. But the adivasi crowd around the Police Station only got thicker. Support and solidarity from surrounding and far off adivasi villages started pouring in. The otherwise omnipresent leaders of political parties were not allowed to negotiate. The adivasi were rather happy about this as in the past the interference of these leaders in any mass protests have always resulted in confusion and withdrawing of the protests with unknown negotiations behind closed door meetings. This time the adivasis chose their representatives from amongst themselves who were communicators rather than leaders and took no decision on behalf of the mass but only communicated them. Soon the police understood that the adivasis were in no mood to return without a result and they disclosed that nothing was in their hands because the ones arrested had already been transferred to Midnapore jail the previous day.

==== The blockade ====
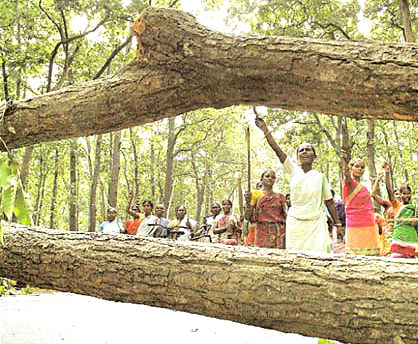
The road to Largarh from Medinipur and Jhargram had been blocked at several places with large felled trees.

The repeated lies by the Lalgarh police infuriated the mass who decided not to depend on the police for any results and to build up a movement to force the release of those illegally detained. They decided to prevent the deployment of reinforcement of police and paramilitary as previously many adivasi movements have been brutally crushed using paramilitary force. Thus roads were dug up and blocked at several places by felled trees. This has uncanny resemblance to the Nandigram movement remained at the headlines throughout 2007 March to December. The Lalgarh village is connected with Jhargram and Medinipur towns by roads which are bordered on both sides by sparse to moderate forests. the roads have been dug up or blocked by trees at least in 25 places.

==== Solidarity ====
The road blockade was not just in and around Lalgarh but villages all around took initiative to do the same as they joined in the movement. Adivasi people all around West Bengal felt oneness with the movement as most have faced torture at the hands of police for suspected of being Maoists or their sympathizers. People from villages across West and East Midnapore, Bankura, Birbhum, Puruliya quickly joined in the movement.

==== Grass root democracy ====
The movement had no conventional leadership and often entire village population sat together and discussed for hours as to the steps to be taken in the movement. Men, women, youth, students all took part in these grand meetings. The traditional leaders were not stripped of the respect that they usually received but were given no more weight than anyone else at the meetings. A forum was thus launched which had no conventional political color and which united the entire adivasi society for a common cause after a long time. It gained immense popularity and most mainstream parties and their mass bases vanished altogether.

==== Village committees ====
Each Village formed a committee of 10 representatives who would with committees of other villages to communicate the decision of the masses of one village to another. Each committee further had two persons who had to be available at all times in case of urgent meetings at short notices.

==== Participation of women ====
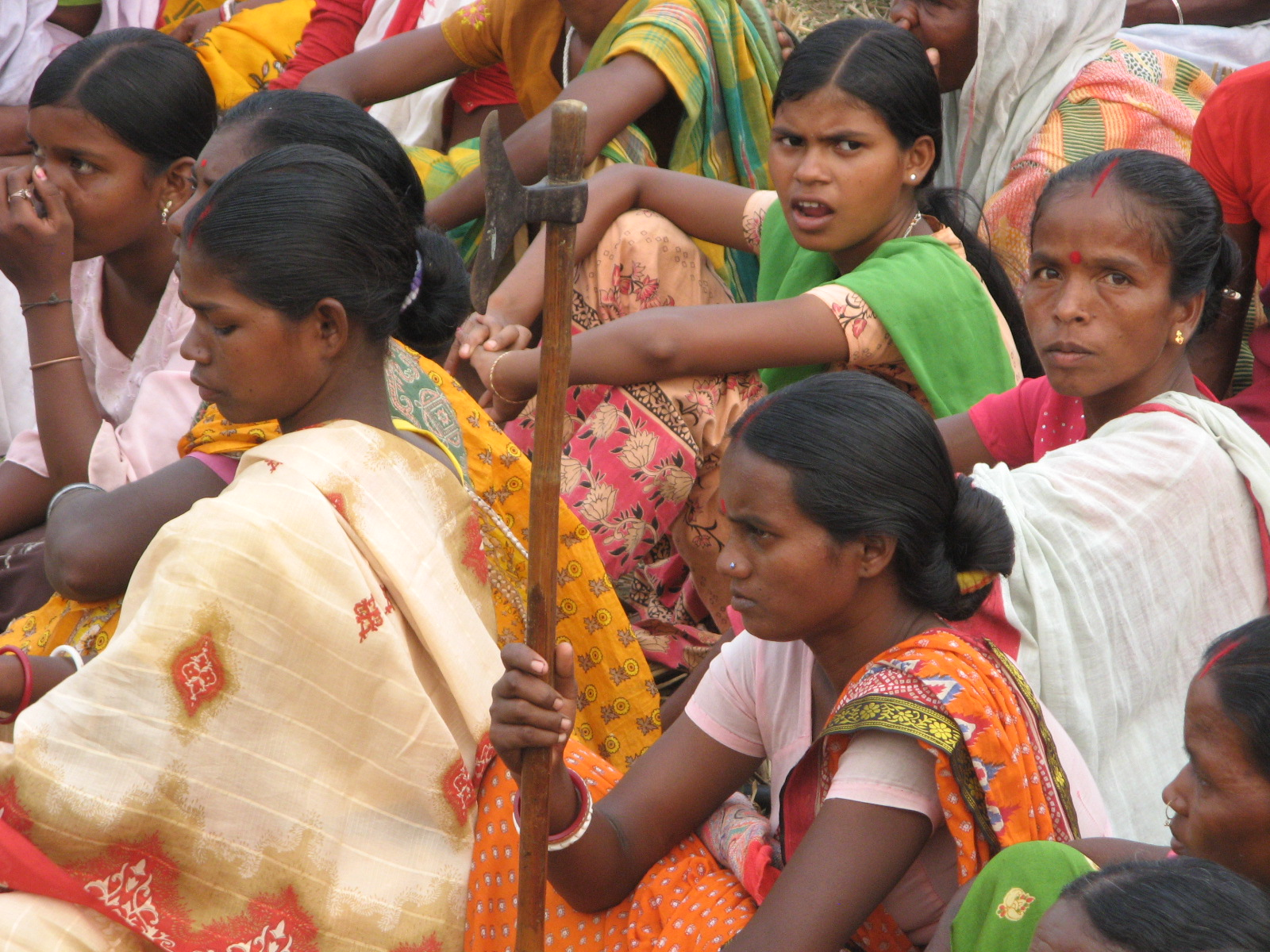
The adivasi women of Lalgarh attending a meeting.

Many Adivasi women have come forward to carry forth this movement. Every 10 persons committee has 5 women members. This involvement of women came naturally to the adivasis who have a more gender-equal society. Women also commonly participate in meetings and rallies. The atrocities over the women of Lalgarh have been excessive, and the women since then never attend rallies unarmed, bringing bows, arrows, knives, swords, scythes, axes, sticks, brooms. The attack on the dawn of 5 November has been most brutal on the women, with one of them losing her sight, as the butt of a police rifle landed on it. Another woman of Lalghar was manhandled and left unconscious in broad daylight as she tried preventing the police who dragged away her husband who happens to be a local Jharkhand Party leader while they were buying medicines. This has added to the torture and repression of women, leading to the present consolidation of the adivasi women.

==== The demands ====
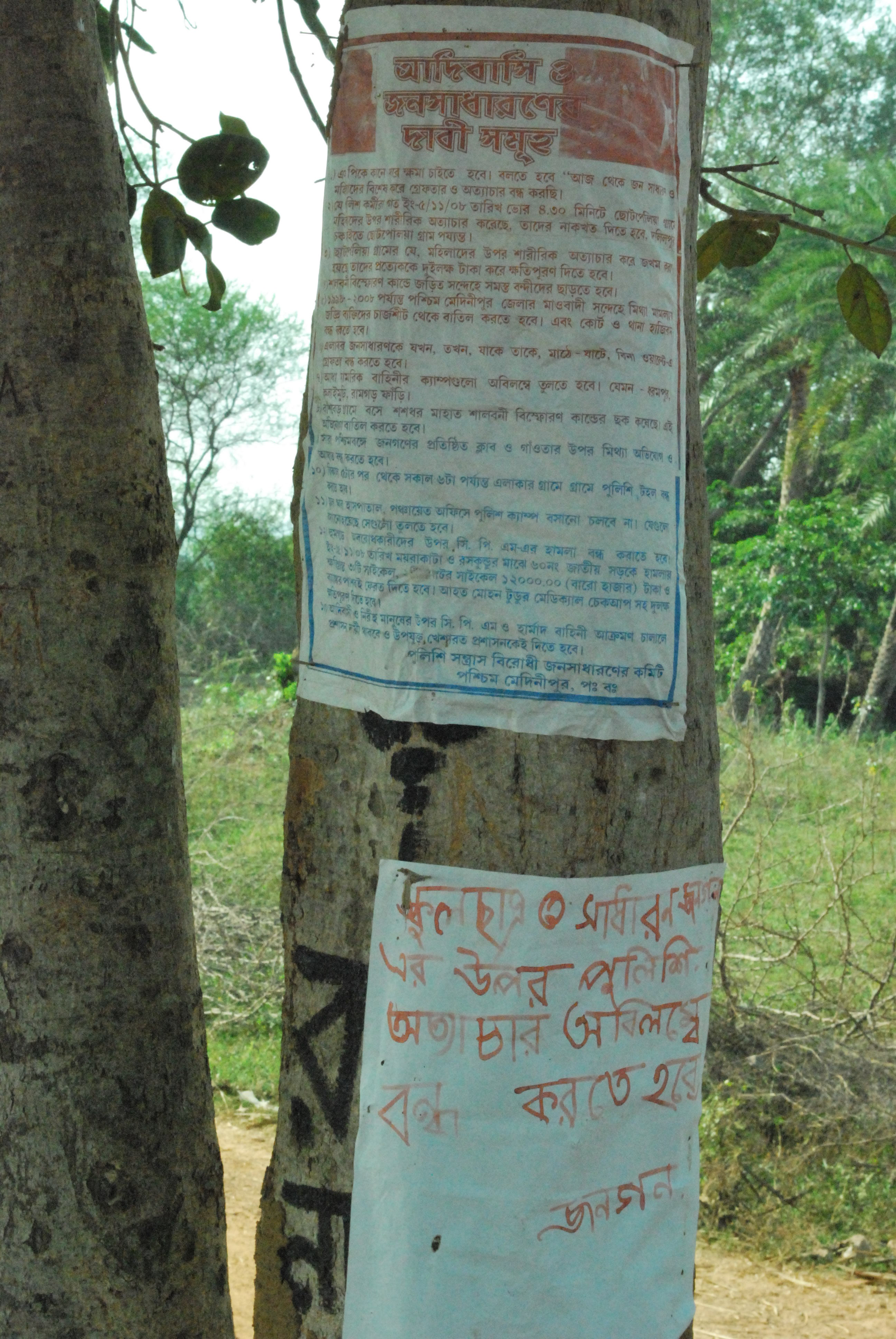
The leaflet printed and put up by The People's Committee Against Police Atrocities, West Midnapore, West Bengal.

The adivasis of Lalgarh sat together to decide upon eleven demands to be met by the government in order that the blockades be removed and police activity normalized. Press statement were given, leaflets distributed and posters in Bengali put up all around, stating the demands.

The English translation of the demands would be

1. The SP has to hold his ears and ask for forgiveness. He has to say 'Form now onwards I will stop illegally arresting the people and especially women.'
2. The police who were involved in the 5/11/2008 incident where women were beaten up have to rub their noses on the ground as punishment, from Dalailpur Chawk to Choto Pelia.
3. The women of Choto Pelia who were injured by the police torture have to be compensated with 200,000 rupees each.
4. All suspects arrested or detained in relation to the Shalboni incident have to be released unconditionally.
5. All people arrested or accused in suspicion of being Maoist in West Midnapore since 1998 have to be cleared of all charges and should not be compelled to attend court sessions or police station enquiries regularly.
6. Arresting locals from anywhere, anytime without warrant have to be ended.
7. All paramilitary camps like those in Dharampur, Kalaimudi, Ramgarh have to be removed immediately.
8. That Sasadhar Mahato planned the Shalboni explosion sitting in Bashber village — this allegation has to be withdrawn.
9. The practice of harassing clubs and organizations of independent people all over Bengal must be put to an end.
10. Police patrolling in villages from 5 in the evening to 6 in the dawn have to be stopped.
11. Schools, hospitals, panchayet offices cannot be used as police camps, the existing ones have to be removed

Later two more demands were added in face of violent attacks by CPI(M) cadres on the adivasi people involved with the movement.

==== Traditional leadership ====
The traditional tribal leaders have been mostly disowned by the tribals of Lalgarh. The Majhi Baba or village elders had since 10 November 2008 proactively engaged in negotiations with the government authority. On 13 November 2008 they declared that most of their demands have been agreed upon and thus they were withdrawing the blockade. Some blockades were removed as well, but the adivasis sat together to decide otherwise and decided to boycott the Bharat Jakat Majhi Marwa group. Their youth wing leader was even beaten up and made to apologise for removing a blockade.

=== Maoist connection ===
The government and the ruling party CPI(M) have throughout maintained that the movement of Lalgarh was instigated and somewhat led by Maoist agents, many of whom have come from Jharkhand and Andhra Pradesh. The police from the beginning blamed the Maoists for the Shalboni blast and raided the villages and detained people for having suspected Maoist Links. The police alleged that Sasadhar Mahato and other Maoist action squad members planned the Shalboni blast while in Bashber village, Lalgarh. The Maoists soon accepted responsibility of the blast and congratulated the people of Lalgarh for their protest, but stopped short if claiming the movement to be under their control. The people of Lalgarh however continually maintained that their movement was peaceful and for demand of basic democratic rights.

=== Ruled by fear ===
Back in 1977, after the first Left Front government took power in West Bengal, entire villages were freed from the control of jotedars, or landlords, by the Communist Party of India (Marxist) workers.

Income poverty and deprivation continue to exist throughout the region — but land reform has given adivasis a level of freedom and security their counterparts in the rest of India do not enjoy.

Marketed as the liberation of Lalgarh, Maoist rule, in fact, made the life of most adivasis worse. Income from forest produce, on which most local residents are dependent, dried up. Government programmes intended to mitigate hardship collapsed altogether.

"In November," says Bhumidhansola resident Manek Singh, "the Maoists forbade us to enter the forests to cut wood. The Forest Department used to pay us Rs. 70 a day for this work. Now, no one even enters this area to purchase the leaf-plates we make. We have been left with nothing."

How, then, have the Maoists gained so much influence in Lalgarh? Jharkhand Party candidate Chunibala Hansda had this simple answer for one journalist reporting on the Lok Sabha elections: "People are scared of them".

Last year, even as the PSBJC was mobilising people against the West Bengal government, the Bharat Jakat Majhi Marwa — an organisation of traditional adivasi community leaders, which is opposed to the CPI(M) — organised a rally to protest Maoist violence. More than 10,000 adivasis gathered in Bhulabheda area of Belpahari on 9 December.

Sudhir Mandal, the adivasi leader who organised the rally, was shot dead less than 48 hours later.

== Extortion and attacks ==
Faced with extortion and attacks by Maoists, government staff also fled the area. Lalgarh residents told The Hindu that the Integrated Child Development Scheme workers were ordered to pay Rs. 1,000 each month; school teachers and staff at the Block Development Office said they were compelled to part with twice as much to local Maoists.

Following the assassination of government doctor Honiran Murmu and staff nurse Bharati Majhi in October, the Lalgarh area has had almost no access to health care.

The 2009 Loksabha election saw a change of power from the Left Wing to the Trinamool Congress- Indian National Congress coalitions in West Bengal, with the coalition winning a total of 25 seats out of 42 seats. Most parts of West Bengal witness post-election political clash and mostly in the Midnapore and Hooghly districts. In Lalgarh area, the CPIM party offices and houses of leaders were ransacked by the people who allege to be getting support from the Maoists. The attacks were increased as the arms and ammunitions were recovered from those party offices. Many of the CPIM supporters have either joined the committee or have left the area in fear of attacks. The people socially boycotted the police, and stopped them from buying foods and other essentials, which forced the police to leave their camps in the Lalgarh area making it a virtual free zone.

== Operation — First phase ==
The Government of West Bengal asked assistance from the Central Government to assist the West Bengal Police in the operations against the Maoists in Lalgarh. Five companies of Central Reserve Police Force (CRPF) and two companies of Commando Battalion for Resolute Action (COBRA) forces who are specially trained to combat with the Maoist arrived at Midnapore on 17 June 2009. In a special meeting between District Officials, Deputy General of Police (West Bengal) and home Secretary Ardhendu Sen the decision to launch the operation was decided. The final order to start the operation was given by Chief Minister, Buddhadev Bhattacharya.

=== Day 1 ===
On 18 June morning at about 8:00 (IST), the CRPF along with State Riot Police and Commandos proceeded toward Pirakata en route to Lalgarh. Further meetings were conducted during the day between police and district officials on the method of the operation. It was decided that the security forces would march towards Lalgarh as the roads were dug up and trees has been placed as blockades on the roads. The forces started out for the operations at around 16:00 (IST) from Pirakata. The forces faced the first resistance from the villagers at Malida village which is around two kilometres from Pirakata, where around 2000 villagers had gathered acting as "human shields". After warning by the additional Superintendent of Police to leave the place, tear gas shells were fired and subsequent lathi charge was made to disperse the mob. The police raided some houses and detained some villagers in search of Maoists. The police were also successful to disperse and remove three more blockades during the day including one at Tirlakhali, and proceeded further 2 kilometres to Bhimpur village at 18:30 IST. The forces decided to push back 2 km and halt for the night by the roadside at Koima. Some of them retreated another 1 km to Tirlakhali. During setting up of the camp, some gun shots were fired at the police forces from the paddy fields at short intervals and the police force return fired in the direction without resulting any casualties. The police force scanned the area through night vision binoculars. The CRPF men who took part in the action were replaced at night by those kept in reserve at the Pirakata camp while the district riot police have been replaced by the state armed police.

=== Day 2 ===
On 19 June 2009 morning several leaflets in Bengali and Ol Chiki were distributed from the Indian Air Force helicopters by the government to stay away from the Maoists and refrain from becoming human shields. The security forces tried to advance towards Lalgarh from four different ways; from Sarenga in Bankura district in the north, from Goaltore in the east, from Jhargram-Dahijuri route in the west and the mainly through Midnapur- Pirakata route in the south of Lalgarh. Three companies of Border Security Force (BSF) have been deployed in the operation. Three more companies of BSF has been sent to Lalgarh. This is the first time the BSF has been deployed in anti-Naxal operations. The helicopters were used during the day mainly over the Lalgarh — Dharampur area for air surveillance.

The squads had started operation in one of the most infamous place known as Jhitkha Jungle, which is considered to be Maoist's den keeping in front the COBRA force dividing in two different groups of about 200 soldiers. The sanitization operation to flush out the Maoists in Jhitkha Jungle by the COBRA forces who arrived at Bhimpur at around 13:00 IST, turned out to be an inspection operation along 2 km stretch of the road that passes through the jungle.

Another squad of police have surrounded the area around Sarenga in adjacent Bankura district to seal the escape routes of the Maoists. The police force consisting of a company of CRPF personnels coming from the Sarenga route stopped at Kargil More as the approach road to the bridge was cut, and they had to retreat back to Sarenga. They also broke a demonstration stage and lathi charged the PCAPA members in Sarenga who were present in the demonstration, where 15 members were arrested.

The team who were approaching by the Jharagram route, though able to reach Dahijuri, they returned to Jhargram due to suspect of landmine on the road and roads being dug by PCAPA members. Another team of security forces started moving from Goaltore, which is around 25 km from Lalgarh. The forces had to stop at different places to clear the trees and bypassing the dug roads. Around 500 forces from the Eastern Frontier Rifle and State Armed Forces took part in the operation in this route. They had to face severe resistance from the PCAPA members at Pingboni village, where around 3000 villagers blocked the roads and shot arrows against the police force. However, at around 17:00 IST the police was able to break the barricade and moved forward. Around 10 persons have been detained in this operation and some houses were raided by the police force in search of the alleged Maoists.

The security forces which have proceeded to Bhimpur on 18 June by clearing road from Pirakata left the stretch unguarded. Taking the opportunity, the villagers and the Maoists again put up barricade at five different places between Malida and Tirlakhali. They were confronted by the Maoists who gun fired at several places including, Pirrakhuli, Pingboni and between Pirakata and Bhimpur. Police were also forced to stop at various places due to suspect of landmine on the road or as the bridges were destroyed. Out of the six kidnapped CPIM members, dead bodies of four were found, taking the tally of death of CPIM party members in the post-election violence in Lalgarh area to 10. At about 19:45 IST, there has been a report of landmine blast near Pirakata Bazaar on SDPO's car in which two police personnel has been grievously injured. The state government has asked for more 6 companies of CRPF from the Central Government to assist the state police in the operation. At around 21:00 IST there was cross fire between the police and Maoists at Lalgarh Police Station. The Jharkhand border near Ghatshila was sealed to stop the Maoists escaping into Jharkhand.

=== Day 3 ===
Maoist Polit Bureau member Koteswar Rao alias Kishenji told over phone to the media that they are ready for negotiations only if the police forces are withdrawn from the area and apologize. The combing operation started around 7:30 IST on 20 June 2009 by the forces in search of Maoists through the Jhitka Jungle with mine protected vehicles. Jhitka was considered to be the most difficult part till now and the police were anticipating serious Maoist attack or landmines. The first group of the forces was able to reach Lalgarh Police Station, which was inaccessible to the forces since November 2008 at around 11:30 without facing any kind of resistance, where they have decided to set up a base camp and proceed to further interior areas.

Houses of two CPIM party members have been torched by the PCPA members in Baita near Jhargram., where the police force arrived and dispersed the attacking mob. An attack by the Maoists took place in Kadashole on the Eastern Frontier Rifles jawans, on the way from Goaltore to Lalgarh at around 16:15 IST. The ill trained police force was attacked with arrows and later with guns. The sudden attack left the police force stunned and they fled the area running for cover. In this confusion and panic, a landmine triggered off leaving 4 police injured in the whole incident. Later, the police returned with a larger force around 17:30 IST and put a strong gun battle for about an hour.

=== Day 4 ===
There was no such operation, as the police wanted to fix the next strategy, four people were arrested near Khayer Pahari, while they were planting landmine on the road from Sarenga to Lalgarh. Some social activists and artists like Aparna Sen, Saoli Mitra went to Lalgarh to overlook the real situation and talked with PCAPA secretary Chhatradhar Mahato, and appealed to both the state and the Maoists to shun arms and opt for a ceasefire till 14 July. Around 35,000 villagers in the Lalgarh area fled to other places for safety. Many villagers who have fled to several relief camps like in Pirakata complained of being beaten up by the police and sexual harassment to the woman. Trinamool Congress MP and Union ministers of state Sisir Adhikari and Mukul Roy went to Lalgrah to provide shelter to the villagers driven out of their homes by the security forces along the stretch from Pirakata to Bhimpur. They were surrounded by the CPM supporters complaining that why they did not come to their rescue when the Maoist-backed PCPA drove them out of the villages and not allowed to progress further.

=== Day 5 ===
The Maoists called for a two long bandh starting from today in five states of India, including Bihar, Jharkhand, West Bengal, Orissa and Chhattisgarh to protest the re capturing of Lalgarh in West Bengal by security forces. The security has been increased in these states and particularly in the three Maoist hit districts of West Bengal. Normal life was affected in the Midnapore district with a few buses plying on the road and most of the shops remained closed. In Purulia district, train services remained suspended on the Purulia – Chandil section since 2:00 as a landmine was found planted on the tracks near Birandi station. Moreover, an anti-mine vehicle was affected in a landmine blast near Boramora jungle of East Singhbhum district in Jharkhand when the vehicle was on its way to Ghatshila which is bordering West Bengal.

The forces have decided to make a secured circle around Lalgarh and then proceed to the villages situated within that circle. The security forces advanced from the Sarenga route, securing the route towards Pingboni, near Goaltore. More CRPF forces, COBRA units joined the existing teams at Goaltore. A checkpost has been created at Ratanpur, near Pingboni by the PCAPA members to prevent the entry by the forces with bows and arrows and guns. The police force continued to patrol the already secured road from Pirakata to Lalgarh.

The Central government declared CPI (Maoist) as a banned militant group in India keeping in mind the growing unlawful activities by the group, while Government of West Bengal said earlier in the day that it was against banning the CPI (Maoist) and will counter such outfits politically. After that the spokesperson of CPI (Maoist), West Bengal State committee, Mr. Gaur Chakraborty was arrested and charged with Unlawful Activities (Prevention) Act on 23 June 2009 for having connection with Lalgarh movement.

== Second phase operation ==
The second phase of the operation started on 26 June 2009 from Goaltore route towards Lalgarh.

=== Day 9 ===
The forces are expected to cover the stretch up to Ramgarh in the first leg. The COBRA forces moved ahead of the forces at night to sanitise the area of the operation, armed with Sniper guns and night vision telescopes. They were able to reach up to Kadasole village facing tough resistance from the Maoists on the way. The forces were attacked by the Maoists with .22 country-made guns which kept firing at the security forces as they fled from the area. The forces including the six companies of the Central Reserve Police Force, two companies of the State police and two companies of the Indian Reserve Battalion counterattacked the Maoists with mortars, light machine guns and AK-47s. Helicopters were used for air surveillance and feeding the ground troops with the information about the Maoists. Satellite images from RISAT — I was also used to track the movements of the Maoists. The Maoists also blasted some landmines. Some of the landmines and an IED were defused safely by the bomb disposal squad. There have been no report of any casualties from either side.

=== Day 10 ===
The forces started the operation from Kadasole towards Ramgarh. They had to face resistance from the Maoists near Mahultol village on the way, an area surrounded by forests. The Maoists fired at the forces and blasted landmines, the forces counter fired at the Maoists with mortars. The progress of the forces stalled for some time due to rain and as landmines were found on the way which were detonated later. The forces were able to capture Ramgarh at around 15:00 IST, where they would establish another base camp. An office of the Leftist trade union AITUC was burned down by the Moists when they were refused shelter in the building just before the security forces entered Ramgarh. They were greeted by the people who stood on the side of the road with smiling faces and offered drinking water to the forces. Another group of the force started moving from Lalgarh towards Barapelia village, where the PCPA leader Chhatrodhar Mahato lives, on the way to Ramgarh. However, the forces faced tough resistance near Aamdanga village, and had to return to Lalgarh.

=== Day 11 ===
The forces patrolled the already claimed area in Lalgarh and discovered several IEDs and landmines. Two persons were arrested from Sarenga in adjoining Bankura district when planting land mines between Belepole and Kargil More. Explosives, detonators and firearms were recovered from them. Maoists also fired at around 01:30 IST from the jungles behind the police camp housed in Ramgarh High School taking advantage of the power cut in the area. However, the force switched on their search lights and fired back, making the Maoists to retreat back.

=== Day 12 ===
The forces started a two pronged operation from Lalgarh and Kadasole towards Kantapahari.

== See also ==
- Naxalite–Maoist insurgency
