= Chhatradhar Mahato =

Indian political activist

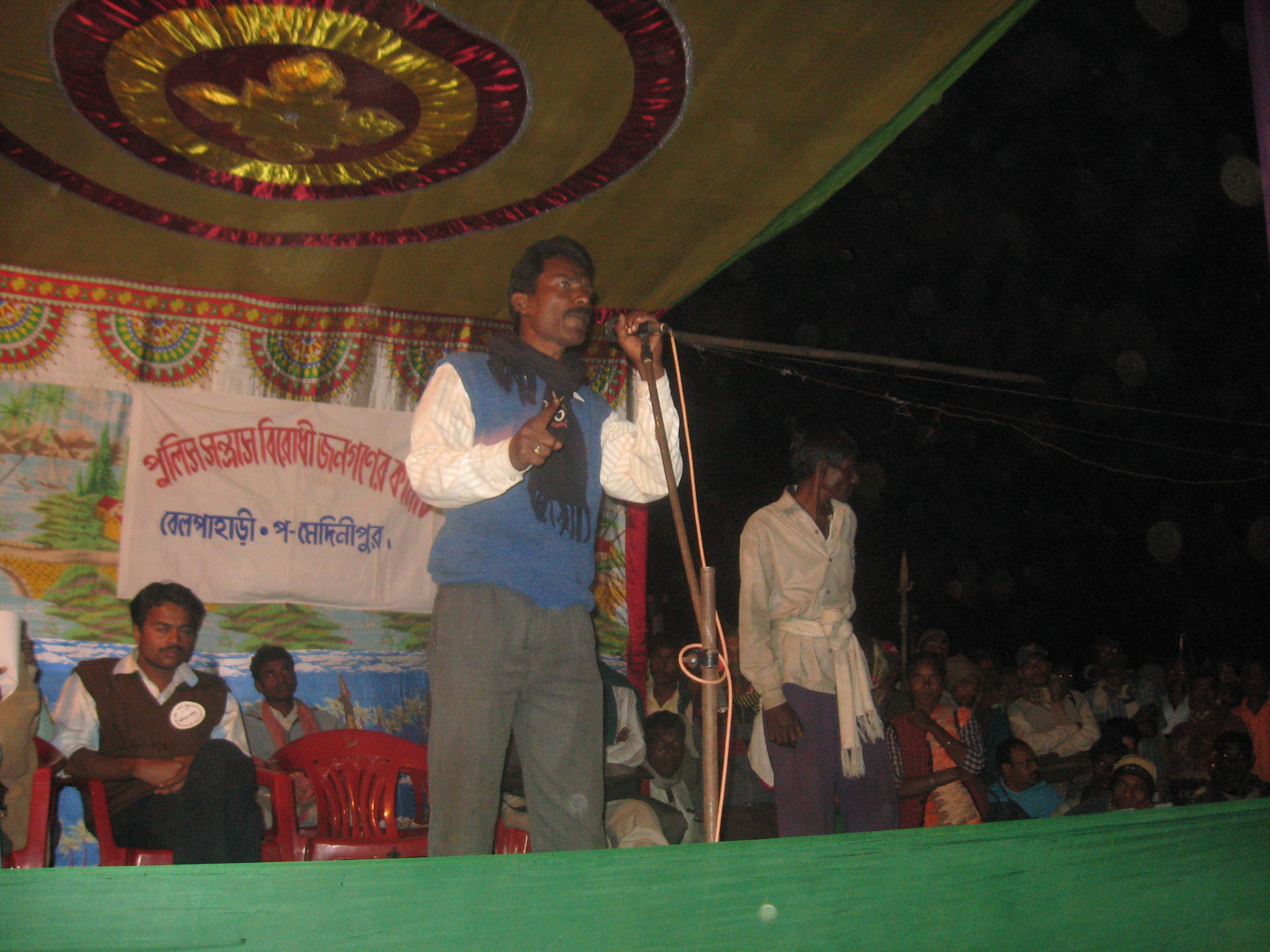
- Born: 1964 (age 61–62); India
- Known for: Tribal Leader
- Spouse: Niati Mahato

Chhatradhar Mahato (born 1964) is an Indian political activist and convict from Lalgarh, West Bengal. He convened the Police Santrash Birodhi Janasadharaner Committee (People's Committee Against Police Atrocities, or PCAPA) during Lalgarh insurgency.

He became prominent following the Salboni blast in November 2008. In 2020, he joined Trinamool Congress (TMC). He was selected in the TMC State Committee in 2020 July. He was arrested by a team of NIA officials in the early hours of March 28 in connection with the murder of a Communist Party of India (Marxist) worker Prabir Mahato in 2009

== Early life ==
Chhatradhar Mahato was born in the hamlet of Amlia in Lalgarh. He is the eldest of three brothers. After high school he went to Midnapore College where he became an active member of the Chhatra Parishad, student wing of the Congress, inspired by Mamata Banerjee. He did not finish college. Mahto belonged to the Kudmi Mahato agricultural caste.

=== Political prisoner status ===
In September 2012 Calcutta High Court granted Chhatradhar political prisoner status along with eight other activists. This ruling made the centre consider challenging the decision, as they feared more naxalites would seek 'political prisoner' status.

=== Conviction ===
He was convicted under the Unlawful Activities Prevention Act (UAPA) along with PCPA members Sukhshanti Baske, Sambhu Soren and Sagun Murmu and sentenced to life imprisonment on 12 May 2015.

== Political career ==
After being released from jail, he joined TMC officially and joined its State Committee in July 2020.

== See also ==
- Jagdish Mahto
