= Gautam Navlakha =

Indian human rights activist and journalist

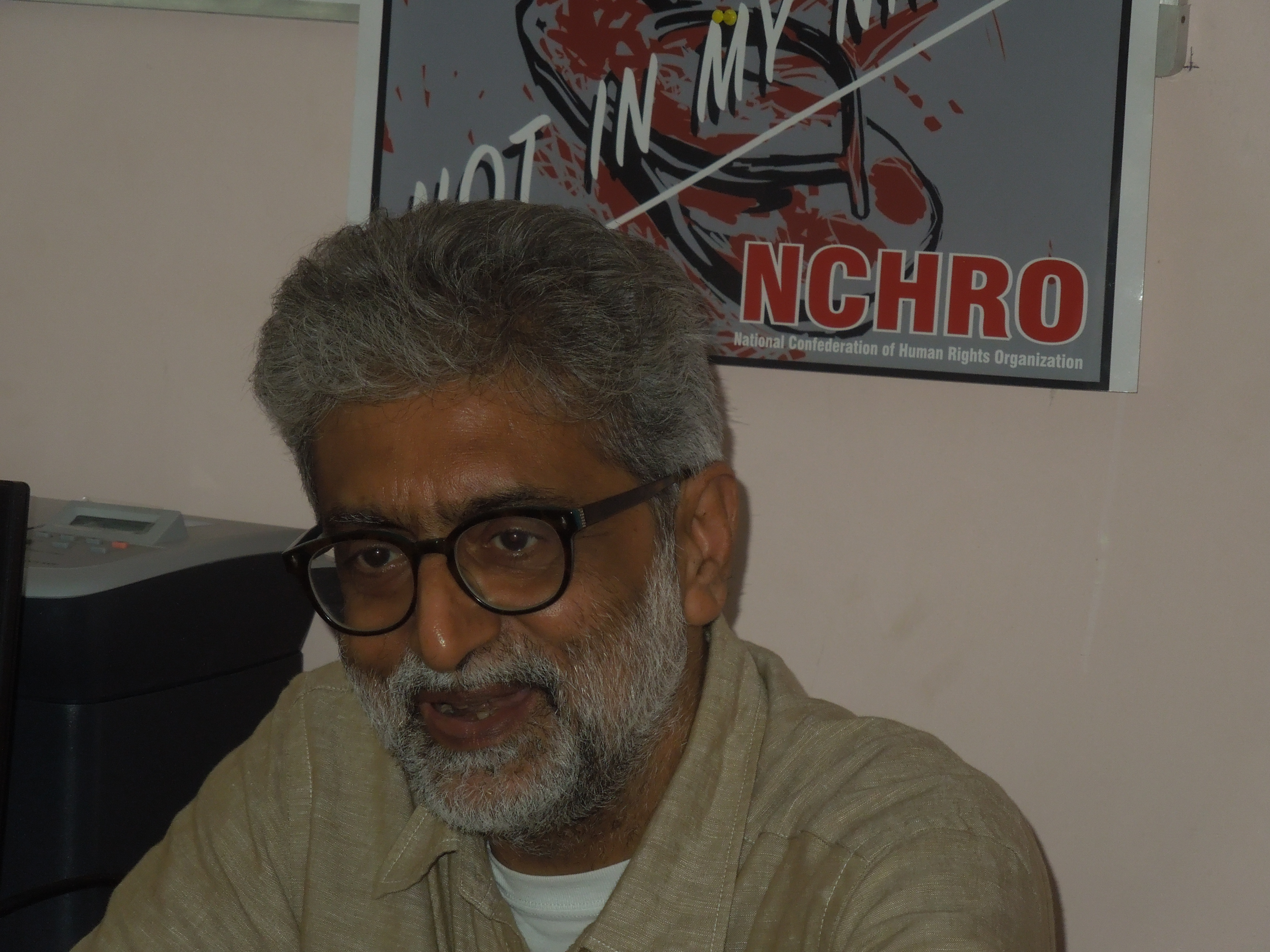
- Navlakha in 2017
- Occupation: Editorial consultant of Economic and Political Weekly
- Organization(s): People's Union for Democratic Rights, Delhi
- Known for: Human rights, civil rights and democratic rights activism
- Partner: Sahba Hussain

Gautam Navlakha (Hindi pronunciation: [ɡɔːt̪ m nʋlkʰaː]) is an Indian human rights activist and journalist. He has written on left-wing extremism and is a critic of army and state atrocities in Kashmir. He is a member of People's Union for Democratic Rights, Delhi. He is also an editorial consultant of the Economic and Political Weekly. He resides in New Delhi.

== Activism ==
Gautam Navlakha has worked as a secretary of the People's Union for Democratic Rights (PUDR), and has also been a convener of the International People's Tribunal on Human Rights and Justice in Kashmir. He has also worked in Kashmir, and in the recent times, his focus of work has been the areas of Chhattisgarh which are in the Maoists' influence.

He had supported Prashant Bhushan's views that a referendum should take place on the subject of demilitarisation in Kashmir, saying that "a referendum is a peaceful and democratic way of resolving the issues where it is difficult to find a solution."

His writings have appeared in Economic and Political Weekly and Sanhati.com.

He criticised the Unlawful Activities (Prevention) Act for being too broad and vague, allowing the government to prosecute dissidents and activists, stating "Such Acts turn the normal jurisprudence upside down. No longer is it the axiom that ‘a person is innocent unless proven guilty’. Under such Acts, ‘an accused is guilty unless proven innocent’."

=== Detention at Srinagar Airport ===
"Corruption is a main policy adopted by India to consolidate its occupation in Kashmir. India is buying the people here and give them monetary benefits so as to get their support for maintaining its occupation."

— Navlakha

In May 2011, Gautam Navlakha was refused entry at the Srinagar Airport and was made to return to Delhi as the Government of Jammu and Kashmir believed that "his presence could disturb peace and order in the Valley." When asked to produce an order in writing, the police gave him an order signed by the district Magistrate which read that he was "prohibited from entering Kashmir under Section 144 of the CRPC." Farooq Abdullah commented, "what does that writer want – to burn Kashmir? Let them burn some other place in India." Following the incident, the International Tribunal for Human rights in Kashmir, the Jammu and Kashmir People's Democratic Party (PDP), Khurram Parvez and the Jammu and Kashmir Coalition of Civil Society criticised the government's decision. Navlakha responded by terming his detention a "paranoia unbecoming of the state authorities."

Navlakha was denied entry to Kashmir after the protests in Kashmir during 2010, but in December 2011, he was in Srinagar to join the activists of the International People's Tribunal on Human Rights and Justice in Jammu and Kashmir and Association of Parents of Disappeared Persons, who had composed a report titled "Alleged Perpetrators – Stories of Impunity in Jammu and Kashmir" from police records, judicial, quasi-judicial and government records accusing 3 brigadiers, 9 colonels, 3 lieutenant colonels, 78 majors and 25 captains of the Indian Army, and 37 senior officials of Indian Paramilitary of murder, kidnapping, enforced disappearance and torture. He also addressed a press conference at Srinagar, revealing that the report has been passed on to the Chief Minister of Jammu and Kashmir and the Prime Minister of India, so that those responsible for the crimes be punished.

=== Litigation ===
Navalakha is an accused in the 2018 Bhima Koregaon violence. On 8 April 2020, the Supreme Court rejected the anticipatory bail pleas of Navlakha and Anand Teltumbde in the Elgar Parishad-alleged Maoist links case, under the Unlawful Activities (Prevention) Act. They were instructed to surrender to the National Investigation Agency on 14 April. National Investigation Agency in the chargesheet stated that Navlakha met with Syed Ghulam Nabi Fai several times to "unite the intellectuals against government forces to defeat them both physically and otherwise.". Later the Supreme Court allowed him house arrest.

== Works ==
- Days and Nights in the Heartland of Rebellion. Penguin UK. 2012. ISBN 978-81-8475-654-8.

== See also ==
- Arundhati Roy
- Binayak Sen
- Jayaprakash Narayan
- Varavara Rao
- Stan Swamy
- Vernon Gonsalves
