= 2018 Bhima Koregaon violence =

Event in Pune, India

Bhima Koregaon violence
- Date: 1 January 2018
- Location: Koregaon Bhima, Maharashtra, India; 18°38′44″N 074°03′33″E
- Methods: Protesting, rock throwing, arson, mobbing

Casualties
- Deaths: 2
- Injuries: 35
- Arrested: 300
- Location within Maharashtra

The 2018 Koregaon Bhima riots refers to violence in the Indian state of Maharashtra during an annual celebratory gathering on 1 January 2018 at Koregaon Bhima to mark the 200th anniversary of the Battle of Koregaon Bhima. The violence and stone pelting by a crowd at the gathering resulted in the death of a 28-year old youth and injuries to five others. The annual celebration, also called Elgar Parishad convention, was organised by retired justices B. G. Kolse Patil and P. B. Sawant. Justice Sawant stated that the term "Elgar" meant loud invitation or loud declaration.

== Historical background ==
=== Battle of Koregaon Bhima ===
The 1818 Battle of Koregaon is of importance for Dalits. On 1 January 1818, 834 troops of the East India Company's Bombay Presidency Army including around 500 soldiers of the 2nd Battalion of the 1st Regiment of Bombay Native Infantry, which was manned predominantly by Mahar soldiers (Even going by the casualties, the majority of those died in the battle (27 out of 49) were not Mahars), defeated a numerically superior (1000) force of the Maratha Peshwa Baji Rao II. A victory pillar (Vijay Sthamb) was erected in Koregaon by the British, commemorating the dead soldiers. In 1928, B. R. Ambedkar led the first commemoration ceremony here. Since then, on 1 January every year, Ambedkarites gather at Bhima Koregaon to celebrate their victory against the upper caste regime of the Maratha Empire, whom they see as their oppressors.

=== Vadhu Budruk trigger ===
It is believed, Emperor Aurangzeb killed and mutilated Chhatrapati Sambhaji Maharaj in 1689. It is claimed that Govind Mahar, from Vadhu Budruk (a village near Bhima Koregaon) collected the body parts and organised the last rites. The memorial for Sambhaji Maharaj is claimed to have been constructed by the Dalit Mahars of that village. Soon after, Govind Mahar’s tomb was constructed in the village after his death. But Marathas refused to accept the role played by Govind Mahar and other Mahars in the last rites of Sambhaji Maharaj as Marathas of that village do have surname as Shivle (means Stitched), and were increasingly vocal about in the days prior to the January violence at Bhima Koregaon in 2018. They had specific objection to a sign at the site that acknowledged the contributions of the Mahars.

== January 2018 events ==
Prior to the commemoration, about 250 groups of Dalit organizations got together under the banner of "Elgar Parishad" and organised a conference at Shaniwar Wada in Pune, the erstwhile seat of the Peshwas. The speakers included two retired judges, B.G Kolte-Patil and P. B. Sawant, and Jignesh Mevani, a newly elected member of the Gujarat Legislative Assembly.

The equating of Hindutva with the Peshwas is said to have irked the Hindu groups.

On 1 January, like every year, Dalit organizations poured into Koregaon Bhima. Tensions had begun to build in a neighbouring village over the question of which community had conducted the last rites of Maratha ruler Chhatrapati Sambhaji Maharaj – the Mahar or the Maratha. The panchayat of Bhima Koregaon issued a notice asking residents to boycott the event by calling for all shops to remain shut that day.

On 1 January, a mob from Vadhu Badruk area attacked the Dalits who were going to attend the annual meeting around the Vijay Stambh. This was after orders were given at Sanaswadi Panchayats for complete strike and celebrate 1 January 2018 as black day. It is alleged that Hindutva leaders Milind Ekbote and Sambhaji Bhide had instigated the mob against the Dalit procession. FIRs were subsequently filed against them but no action was taken by the police against them. Dalit organizations blocked roads and started demonstrations across Maharashtra Violence was reported across Pune - a 16-year-old boy was killed during the violence. A Maharashtra bandh was called by Prakash Ambedkar on 3 January 2018. The aftermath consisted of various protests across Maharashtra resulting in 30 policemen being injured and over 300 people being detained. Protests were staged all over Maharashtra. In Mumbai, suburban trains were affected due to which Dabbawalas had to suspend their services.

== Aftermath ==
- On 2 January 2018, an FIR was filed against Sambhaji Bhide and Milind Ekbote for allegedly instigating violence on Dalits.
- On 8 January 2018, an FIR was filed against Kabir Kala Manch members namely Sudhir Dhawale, Sagar Gorkhe, Ramesh Gaichor, Harshali Potdar, Deepak Dengle, Jyoti Jagtap at Vishrambaug Police Station in Pune, for allegedly making provocative statements at Elgar Parishad.
- In February 2018, the Supreme Court criticised the State government and probe agencies for the slow progress of their investigation into against Milind Ekbote, questioning the agencies’ claims that he was allegedly ‘untraceable’. Chief Minister Devendra Fadnavis said in the state assembly that the police had raided all hotels and lodges in Pune and Kolhapur in search of Ekbote, conducted combing operations, detained his followers and examined more than 100 call records but failed to locate him.
- On 14 March 2018, the district rural police of Pune arrested Milind Ekbote. The Supreme Court cancelled his interim bail plea after he did not cooperate with the probe agencies despite five summonses for interrogation and refused to hand over his mobile phone.
- On 22 April 2018, a nineteen-year-old dalit witness, whose house was burnt in the violence, was found dead in a well. Her family alleged that she was under intense pressure to withdraw her statement. Her brother, Jaideep, also a witness, had been arrested by Pune Rural Police on charges of attempt to murder.
- Investigation by the police in the following months resulted in various arrests, such as that of Rona Wilson in June 2018 under Unlawful Activities (Prevention) Act.
- In August 2018 five activists, including Varavara Rao, Arun Ferreira, Sudha Bharadwaj and Gautam Navlakha, were picked up in simultaneous raids across the country, the police alleged that the activists had ties to Maoists, apart from links to the Bhima Koregaon incident.
- On 22 January 2020, the newly elected Maharashtra government ordered a probe into the matter, further considering constituting a Special Investigation Team (SIT) to look into the investigation.
- On 25 January 2020, the National Investigation Agency, a central agency governed by the Union Ministry of Home Affairs, took over the case from the Maharashtra government. Maharashtra Home Minister Anil Deshmukh, accused the Union Government of not taking the State's consent before taking over the case.
- In October 2020, the NIA released a 10,000 page chargesheet regarding the incident with fresh names, including Stan Swamy, a Jesuit priest, who the NIA accused of conspiring to bring together Dalit and Muslim forces to take on what he referred to as the “fascist government” at the Centre. The NIA also accused him of being connected to the banned left-wing militant organisation, CPI (Maoist).

== Fact finding commission ==
In February 2018, The Maharashtra Home Department set up a fact finding Commission. This Commission became operational in September 2018 and consisted of former Calcutta High Court chief justice JN Patel and state Chief Information Commissioner Sumit Mullick. The tenure of the Commission expired on 8 April 2020 and they had requested for a six month extension.

== Arrests ==
- 8 June 2018: Pune Police arrested Surendra Gadling, Sudhir Dhawale, Rona Wilson, Shoma Sen and Mahesh Raut with alleged Maoist links for inciting riots.
- 28 August 2018: the Pune police carried out searches of nine rights activists, and arrested five of them. Those arrested include activists Varavara Rao, lawyer Sudha Bharadwaj, and activists Arun Ferreira, Gautam Navlakha and Vernon Gonsalves. The Supreme Court ordered them to be placed under "house arrest". On 10 August 2022, the Supreme Court granted bail to Varavara Rao on medical grounds.
- 12 September 2018: The Supreme Court extends the "house arrest" until 17 September 2018.
- 28 September 2018: The Supreme Court extends the house arrest by another four weeks, but declined the appointment of a special investigation team.
- 26 October 2018: The police had arrested accused Arun Ferreira and Vernon Gonsalves. Another accused Sudha Bharadwaj was taken into custody the next day.
- On the night of 17 November 2018: The Pune police arrested activist Varvara Rao.
- According to police, all the arrested activists had links with the Maoists, who backed Elgar Parishad event held in Pune on 31 December 2017. Police claimed that Elgar Parishad led to the violence at Koregaon Bhima war memorial on 1 January 2018 when thousands of people gathered here to mark the 200th anniversary of the Battle of Bhima Koregaon.
- The police also filed a chargesheet against 10 people including five rights activists just around a week ago from Rao's arrest. it claimed that the December 31 event was organised as per a plan by the banned CPI(Maoist), to mobilise Dalit groups and other organisations against the ruling establishment. It said that inciting speeches at the event provoked the masses and aggravated violence in Bhima Koregaon on 1 January 2018. According to the police document, activists and others are active members of CPI (Maoist). Also, there was also a plot to assassinate Prime Minister Narendra Modi, it claimed.
- On 14 April 2020, the 129th birth anniversary of Dr Ambedkar, his grandson-in-law, Anand Teltumbde was arrested by the NIA in connection with the case. A week before his arrest on April 8, The Supreme Court of India denied him anticipatory bail. It was later revealed by the NIA that Anand Teltumbde along with his associates, were in contact with RDF (banned terrorist organisation in Andhra Pradesh and Telangana) and CPI(Maoist), and organised weapons and explosive training for the militants in Korchi forest area of Maharashtra.
- On 9 October 2020, the NIA arrested 83-year-old Stan Swamy in connection with the case. The NIA alleged that the Persecuted Prisoners Solidarity Committee (PPSC) co-convened by Swamy and Sudha Bharadwaj was a front for Maoists.
- On 28 July 2023, The Supreme Court granted bail to activists Vernon Gonsalves and Arun Ferreira, accused in the violence case. A bench of Justices Aniruddha Bose and Sadhanshu Dhukia said that the five-year-long incarnation of the activists made them duly eligible for bail despite the fact that the offences they're accused of is "grave".
- On 14 May 2024, The Supreme Court of India grants bail to the Bhima Koregaon-accused Gautam Navlakha. The same is subject to the payment of Rs 20 Lakhs for his house arrest.

In December 2022, Sub-Divisional Police Officer Ganesh More admitted that the Elgar Parishad event had no role in the violence in an oath before the judicial commission investigating the case.

== Independent reports ==
An Rashtriya Swayamsevak Sangh backed think tank called Forum for Integrated National Security (FINS), mainly consisting of retired army officers, released a report on the Bhima Koregaon riots. The report absolved the BJP corporator Milind Ekbote and RSS worker Sambhaji Bhide from direct involvement. Instead, it blamed Maoists (ultra left-wing organisations) for instigating the Dalit activists. It also blamed the Maharashtra Police for "apathy" and overlooking evidence. Analysis shows that the Pune police made claims in Court which resemble the FINS report. In contrast, the report by the multi-member "fact finding committee" led by deputy mayor Siddharth Dhende submitted that right-wing activists Sambhaji Bhide and Milind Ekbote had pre-planned the entire violence. The report by the Rashtra Seva Dal (RSD) questioned how the right wing activists who were initially named in the FIR were still able to give interviews while a divisive environment was being created. The RSD also called for a judicial enquiry to hold the administration accountable for any lapses.

Forensic analysis by Arsenal Consulting, a Massachusetts-based digital forensics firm, revealed that incriminating evidence, including the letter to assassinate the prime minister Narendra Modi, found on Surendra Gadling and Rona Wilson's computers was planted there by an attacker by the use of phishing email. Security firm SentinelOne said that they have found a 'provable connection' between the evidence fabrication to the Pune police. The Washington Post reported in December 2022 that hackers had planted evidence on Stan Swamy's computer as well.
