= Vernon Gonsalves =

Trade unionist, activist, academic

- Born: Byculla, Mumbai, Maharashtra, India
- Occupations: trade unionist, activist and academic
- Spouse: Susan Abraham

Vernon Gonsalves (born 1957) is a trade unionist, activist and academic, and an accused in the 2018 Bhima Koregaon violence. His wife, lawyer Susan Abraham, is also a workers rights activist. Vernon was arrested under the Unlawful Activities (Prevention) Act.

== Biography ==
Vernon Gonsalves is a Mangalorean Catholic and born in Byculla in South Mumbai. He was a teaching faculty at several colleges in Mumbai such as Ruparel College, HR College of Commerce and Economics, and Akbar Peerbhoy College of Commerce and Economics. He was a gold medalist in his master's degree in Commerce studies.

== Arrests and conviction ==
On 28 August 2018, Gonsalves was arrested by the Pune Police along with activists Varavara Rao, Arun Ferreira and Gautam Navlakha, and lawyer Sudha Bharadwaj. The Supreme Court of India ordered them to be under house arrest. He was represented by prominent senior counsel Mihir Desai during his bail hearings. There was a controversy when the Court asked Gonsalves why he had a copy of the Leo Tolstoy's book of War and Peace, instead of Biswajit Roy's. This created a storm on Twitter.

In September 2018, Historian Romila Thapar and other activists approached the Supreme Court of India to demand an independent probe into the high-handedness of the Pune police in the arrests of the five activists, including Vernon. This petition was dismissed by the three judge bench with Justice Dhananjaya Y. Chandrachud dissenting.

Earlier, Vernon Gonsalves was accused of being a Central Committee members of CPI (Maoist) and convicted under the Arms Act, Explosives Act and Unlawful Activities (Prevention) Act(UAPA). Gonsalves was charged in around 20 cases, acquitted in 17 due to lack of evidence, discharged in one, standing trial in one and convicted in one by a Nagpur court. He was in jail after being arrested with Shridhar Shrinivasan in August 2007 and released in June 2013.

== See also ==
- Stan Swamy
