= Krishna Bharadwaj =

Krishna Bharadwaj may refer to:

- Krishna Bharadwaj (actor) (born 1989), Indian television actor
- Krishna Bharadwaj (economist) (1935–1992), Indian economist
