= Cherabanda Raju =

Indian poet

Cherabanda Raju (1944 - 2 July 1982) was a revolutionary poet, novelist, and songwriter, who wrote in the Telugu language. He was one of the six poets who were known for their Digambara (naked) Poetry that flourished during the mid-1960s in Andhra Pradesh.

== Early life ==
Raju, whose real name was Baddam Bhaskara Reddy, was born into a farming family in Ankusapuram village of Nalgonda district in 1944. Chera, as he was endearingly called by his friends, was influenced by the literary works of Sarat Chandra Chattopadhyay and Rabindranath Tagore during his formative years. Even the legendary poet Sri Sri derived a lot of inspiration from him and dedicated his most popular anthology of poems Maha Prasthanam to Chera.

== Political life ==
Cherabanda Raju was a teacher by profession and held a degree in Oriental Literature. His literary works include Ganjineellu, Nippurallu, Gamyam, Kattipaata, Diksoochi, Muttadi and Kaanti Yuddham. He, through his poetry, advocated the betterment of the oppressed classes such as Dalits and peasants and fought for their rights. After the Digambara School of poetry had lost steam and became a spent force, he cofounded Virasam (Viplava Rachayitala Sangham) along with other revolutionary poets such as Varavara Rao, Sri Sri, Kutumba Rao and Ramana Reddy, and continued his poetic journey.

During his lifetime he was harassed by law enforcement agencies, implicated in many cases and jailed. While serving prison sentence his health deteriorated and he died of brain tumor at the age of 38.
