= Milind Ekbote =

Hindutva activist

Milind Ekbote is a resident of Shivaji Nagar, Pune. He is the president of Dharmaveer Sambhaji Maharaj Pratishthan and Samasta Hindu Aghadi (SHA), and the founder of Shiv Pratap Bhoomi Mukti Andolan.

Members of his organisation, SHA, have been alleged to have intercepted hundreds of vehicles carrying cows.

== Family ==
His sister-in-law, Jyotsna Ekbote is a sitting corporator in Pune.

== Communal violence and arrest ==
On 7 October 2001, Milind delivered an inciteful speech to a crowd near the Sorati Somnath Temple, after which the crowd demolished a Muslim cemetery and Idgah, and also set fire to Muslim shops and houses.

On 2 January 2018, an FIR was registered against him and Sambhaji Bhide for orchestrating violence against Dalits at Bhima Koregaon.

In February, the Supreme Court criticised the State government of Maharashtra for its failure to apprehend Ekbote. Chief minister, Devendra Fadnavis said in the state assembly that the police had raided all hotels and lodges in Pune and Kolhapur in search of Ekbote, conducted combing operations, detained his followers and examined more than 100 call records but failed to locate him.

On 14 March 2018, the District Rural Police of Pune arrested Milind. The Supreme Court cancelled his interim bail plea after he did not cooperate with the probe agencies, refusing to hand over his mobile phone despite five summonses for interrogation. During this time, Yerwada jail officials facilitated a meeting between Milind and his relatives in violation of norms.

On 19 April 2018, Milind received bail from the Pune District and Sessions Court.
