= Viragalur =

Village of Tamil Nadu

Viragalur விரகாலூர்
- Village
- Map of Tamil Nadu Viragalur (India)
- Coordinates: 10.9093°N 78.97374°E
- Country: India
- State: Tamil Nadu
- District: Tiruchirappalli
- Region: Tiruchirappalli

Population (2011)
  - Total: 4,466

Languages
  - Official: Tamil
- Time zone: UTC+5:30 (IST)
- Postal code: 621722
- Census code: 635933

Viragalur is a village located in Lalgudi taluk of Tiruchirappalli district, Tamil Nadu. According to the 2011 Census of India, the village has population of 4466 of which 2285 are males while 2181 are females.

== Notable people ==
- Stan Swamy
