= Sambhaji Bhide =

Hindutva activist

Sambhajirao Bhide
- Born: Sambhaji Vinayak Bhide, 10 June 1933 (age 93); Sangli, Sangli State, British India
- Education: Savitribai Phule Pune University
- Occupation: Activist
- Organisation: Shiv Pratishthan Hindustan
- Known for: Founding Shri Shiv Pratishthan Hindustan
- Other political affiliations: Rashtriya Swayamsevak Sangh

Sambhaji Vinayak Bhide is a Hindutva activist. He was a full-time worker for the Hindu-nationalist organisation, the Rashtriya Swayamsevak Sangh, before leaving to form his own organisation, the Shiv Pratishthan Hindustan, in 1984. The organisation claimed to spread the teachings of Shivaji Maharaj and his son Sambhaji Maharaj. Bhide has campaigned for a gold throne to be installed at Raigad fort.

== Activities ==
He has a number of followers in Sangli, Kolhapur, Pune, Belgaum, Mumbai and Satara parts of Maharashtra and Karnataka. In 2008, his followers ransacked movie halls showing the film, Jodhaa Akbar; Bhide was arrested for his role in the unrest.

In 2017, Sambhaji Bhide and Sanjay Jadar along with many of the Shiv Pratishthan Hindustan cadre were booked for brandishing swords and shouting slogans at the Pandharpur Wari pilgrimage marches for saint-poets Dnyaneshwar and Tukaram.

In 2018, a complaint filed by the Sambhaji Brigade reported that Bhide was claiming that the Manusmriti were a step ahead of the teachings of Sant Dnyaneshwar and Sant Tukaram. He was described in a 2018 media report as being close to Indian Prime Minister Narendra Modi which has also been stated by the PM in the past. Multiple FIRs have been filed against him for making "objectionable" statements against historical figures such as Gandhi, Phule, Ambedkar and Periyar. An advisory committee of the Nashik Municipal Corporation (NMC) found Bhide to be guilty of violating the Pre-conception and Pre-natal Diagnostic Techniques (Prohibition of Sex Selection) Act when he said that couples that eat mangoes from his garden can help couples give birth to sons.

In 2024, he opposed the demands for Maratha reservation.

== Koregaon Bhima violence ==
On 2 January 2018, a First Information Report was filed against him and Milind Ekbote for allegedly inciting the 1 January 2018 violence against Dalits in Koregaon Bhima. Bhide claimed that the roots of the violence lay in the Elgar Parishad of 31 December 2017. He demanded that leaders such as Prakash Ambedkar, who had spoken at the event be arrested. In August 2018, a petition was filed before the Bombay High Court seeking Bhide's arrest for his role in the Bhima Koregaon violence. Activists approached the Supreme Court of India to demand an independent probe as to why the Pune police had not arrested Bhide till date despite multi-city searches and the addition of UAPA provisions. This petition was dismissed by the three judge bench with Justice Dhananjaya Y. Chandrachud dissenting.

Since then he has advocated for the amendment of SC and ST (Prevention of Atrocities) Act claiming that it was being misused in rural areas.
