= Indian Social Institute, Bengaluru =

Jesuit development centre based in India

Indian Social Institute, Bangalore
- Abbreviation: ISI-B
- Predecessor: Indian Institute of Social Order
- Established: 1993; 33 years ago
- Type: Non-governmental organization
- Location: Benson Town, Bengaluru, Karnataka, India
- Director: Joseph Xavier, SJ
- Main organ: Critique (tri-annual)
- Affiliations: Society of Jesus
- Website: www.isibangalore.com

Indian Social Institute, Bengaluru (ISI-B) is a Jesuit research and training institute in Bengaluru, India. It started in 1963 as a centre of the Indian Social Institute and later became an independent institution in 1993. The institute conducts research and training on social development and human rights issues.

== History ==
The Indian Social Institute was founded in Pune in 1951 by Jesuit priest Jerome D'Souza, a member of the Constituent Assembly of India. It moved to New Delhi in 1963, the same year it opened a centre in Bangalore.

The Bangalore centre initially offered training in community development, agriculture, nutrition and other subjects. During the 1970s, it began focusing more on training social activists.

Stan Swamy, a Jesuit priest and tribal rights activist, was director from 1975 to 1986. In 2023, human rights lawyer V. Suresh recalled Swamy's work at the institute during an event marking the second anniversary of his death.

The institute also operated a documentation centre that supplied material to social activists. In 1993, the Bangalore centre became an independent institution.

== Activities ==
The institute conducts research and training on social development, human rights, labour migration and women's issues.

In April 2025, it organised a multi-faith festival in Bengaluru featuring observances of Ugadi, Eid, Mahavir Jayanti, Baisakhi, Nowruz and Easter.

== See also ==
- List of Jesuit sites
