= Hetu Bhardwaj =

Indian Hindi fiction writer

Hetu Bhardwaj (Hoti Lal Bhardwaj) is an Indian Hindi fiction writer. Bhardwaj writes in contemporary genre of the language, and has published more than 20 novels/ short stories collections so far. Bhardwaj was awarded the Rajasthan Sahitya Academy Award in 1980, and again in 1993.

Some of his works include Teen Kamron Ka Makan, Chief Sahab Aa Rahey Hain, "Chhupane Ko Chhupa Jaata, "Banti Bigarti Lakeeren, Teerth Yatra.

Born in Ramner, Bulandshahar, UP on 15.1.1937, Bhardwaj obtained his MA in Hindi Literature in 1960 from Rajasthan University, Jaipur. He received his PhD in Hindi Literature in 1981, also from Rajasthan University. He retired as Principal, Government College, Neem-Ka-Thana, District Sikar, [Rajasthan], and now spends his time in freelance writing, and taking care of his family at Neem-Ka-Thana, and at Jaipur.
