= Varavara Rao =

Indian writer (born 1940)

Pendyala Varavara Rao
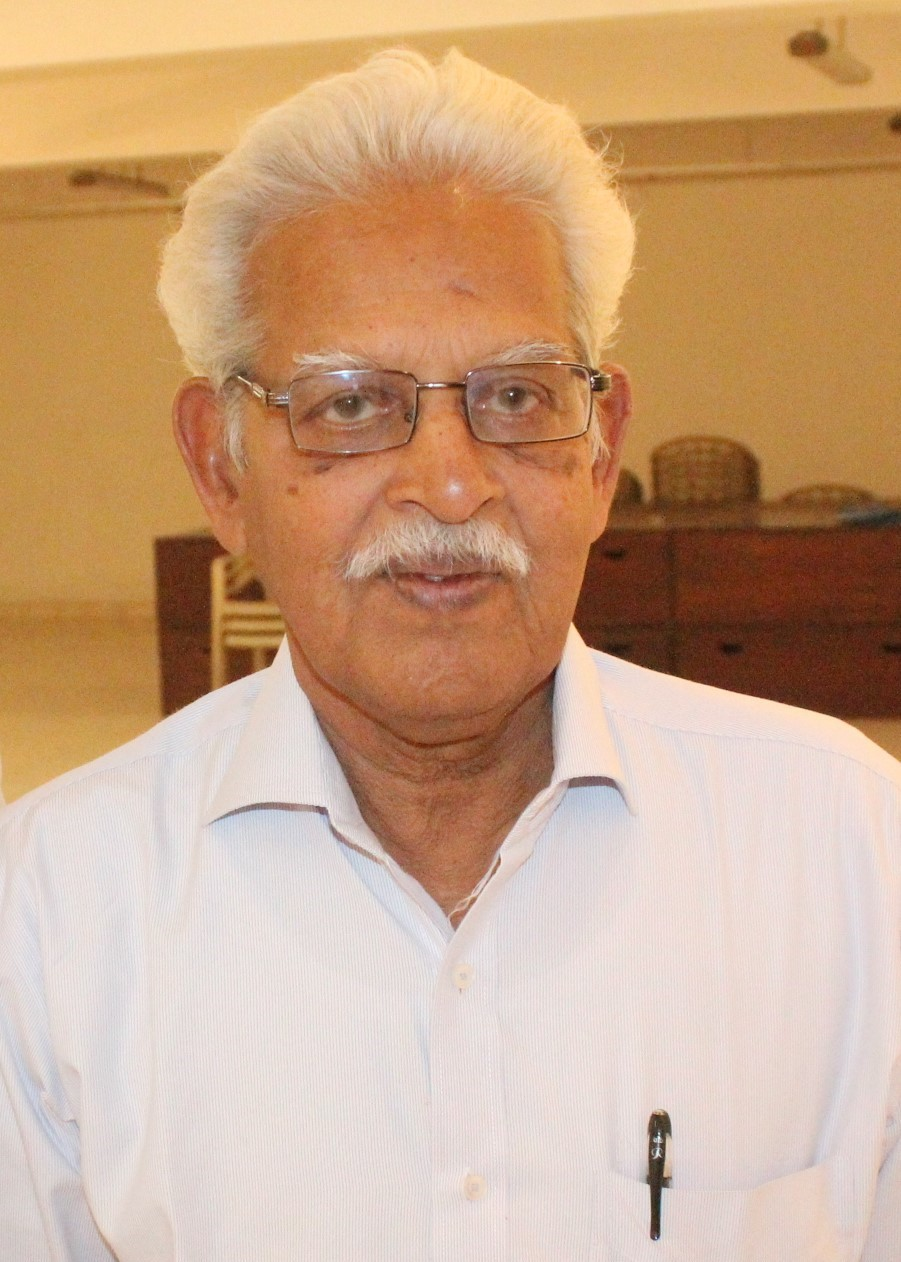
- Born: 3 November 1940 (age 85); Chinnapendyala, Warangal, Andhra Pradesh (now in Telangana), India
- Education: Osmania University
- Occupations: Activist, poet, journalist, literary critic, and public speaker
- Writing career
- Language: Telugu

Pendyala Varavara Rao (born 3 November 1940) is an Indian Maoist ideologue, poet, teacher, and writer from Telangana, India. He is an accused in the 2018 Bhima Koregaon violence and has been arrested under the non-bailable Unlawful Activities (Prevention) Act . Rao was arrested on the charge of plotting to assassinate Indian prime minister, possibly based upon planted evidence. In August 2022, he was released on bail by the Supreme Court of India, on medical grounds.

== Personal life and education ==
Pendyala Varavara Rao was born on 3 November 1940 in Chinna Pendyala, Warangal district into a Telugu Brahmin family. He studied at Chinna Pendyala, Warangal and Hyderabad. In 1960, he completed a post-graduate degree in Telugu literature from Osmania University.

== Career and teaching ==
Rao initially taught Telugu literature at two different private colleges in Telangana, before joining the Ministry of Information and Broadcasting of the Government of India as a publication assistant. He retired from teaching in 1998. Later, he left research to join a private college at Siddipet, Medak district as a lecturer. From there he switched over to DAVP, Ministry of Information and Broadcasting, New Delhi to work as a Publication Assistant. Again he left the job to join as a lecturer in another private college at Jadcherla, Mahabubnagar district. He moved to Warangal to join Chanda Kanthaiah Memorial College (CKM College) where he worked as Telugu lecturer and later became its principal.

== Writing ==
Rao is considered as one of the best critics in Telugu literature and taught Telugu literature to graduate and undergraduate students for about 40 years. He is known as an orator and had addressed thousands of public gatherings.

=== Publications and editorial work ===
In 1966, Rao founded a group called Saahithee Mithrulu (Friends of Literature), which started producing a literary journal called Srujana. The journal was initially published on a quarterly basis, but following wide popularity, it became a monthly journal in 1970. Srujana was published from 1966 to 1992, and focused on publishing the works of young, local poets. Srujana was later replaced with a new journal named Arunatara. Rao, along with a group of Telugu writers, periodically self-published stories, poems, and other literature, and sold them directly to book sellers.

=== Poetry ===
Rao began publishing poetry in the late 1950s in journals and magazines, and his first poetry collection Chali Negallu (Camp Fires) was published in 1968.

Varavara Rao has published fifteen poetry collections of his own besides editing a number of poetry anthologies. His poetry collections are: Chali Negallu (Camp Fires, 1968), Jeevanaadi (Pulse, 1970), Ooregimpu (Procession, 1973), Swechcha (Freedom, 1978), Samudram (Sea, 1983), Bhavishyathu Chitrapatam (Portrait of the Future, 1986), Muktakantam (Free Throat, 1990), Aa Rojulu (Those Days, 1998), Unnadedo Unnattu (As it is, 2000), Dagdhamauthunna Bagdad (Burning Bagdad, 2003), Mounam Oka Yuddhaneram (Silence is a War Crime, 2003), Antassootram (Undercurrent, 2006), Telangana Veeragatha (Legend of Telangana, 2007), Palapitta Paata (Song of Palapitta, 2007) and Beejabhoomi (Field of Seeds, 2014). In 2008, an anthology of selected poetry by Rao, titled Varavara Rao Kavitvam (1957-2007) was published. His work has been translated into English by Dr. D Venkat Rao (professor at the English and Foreign Languages University, Hyderabad). His poetry has been translated into almost all Indian languages. His poetry collections appeared in Malayalam, Kannada and Hindi and a few Bengali and Hindi literary journals brought out special numbers of his poetry and writings. In 1986, one of his poetry anthologies, Bhavishyathu Chitrapatam (Portrait of the Future), was banned by the state government.

=== Criticism ===
Rao's book, Telangana Liberation Struggle and Telugu Novel – A Study into Interconnection between Society and Literature (1983) is considered to be a landmark in Marxist literary criticism in Telugu. He published half a dozen volumes of literary criticism and a volume of his editorials in Srujana.

=== Prison diaries ===
During his periods of incarceration, Rao maintained and published a personal journal, Sahacharulu (1990), which was translated into English and published in 2010 as Captive Imagination. He also translated Ngũgĩ wa Thiong'o's prison diary, Detained, and novel, Devil on the Cross, into Telugu.

== Political activism ==
=== 1960s: Founding of Virasam ===
In 1967, Rao formed part of a generation of writers and poets that criticized the Telugu literary community's disengagement with politics. He was instrumental in founding two writer's associations that actively engaged in politics; the Tirugubatu Kavulu (Association of Rebel Poets) in Warangal, and the Viplava Rachayitala Sangham (Revolutionary Writers’ Association), popularly known as Virasam, in 1970. The group was inspired by the Naxalbari uprising. Other members of Virasam included author Kutumba Rao, dramatist Rachakonda Viswanatha Sastri, poet and historian K.V. Ramana Reddy, Jwalamukhi, Nikhileswar, Nagna Muni and Cherabanda Raju. Virasam was closely associated with Dalit politics. As a member of Virasam, Rao participated in educational campaigns and contributed to several anthologies of writing published by authors connected with Virasam. He has been part of the executive committee of Virasam since its inception. Virasam was subsequently banned by the Andhra Pradesh State Government in 2005, for one year, under the Andhra Pradesh Public Security Act, 1992. It was banned again in 2013.

=== 1973–75: Imprisonment during the Emergency ===
Rao was initially arrested in 1973 by the Andhra Pradesh State Government, under the Maintenance of Internal Security Act, on charges of inciting violence through his writing. Although he was released by an order of the Andhra Pradesh High Court, which rebuked the State Government for failing to show that his writings had resulted in actual violence, he was rearrested in 1975, during the Emergency, under the same law. He was released after this second arrest, as well.

The High Court of Andhra Pradesh struck down the order and released him after a month and a half. The High Court judgment asked the government not to resort to such actions against writers unless their writings have an immediate and direct bearing in a physical action. After a few months, the government charged a conspiracy case wherein all the actions of revolutionaries were shown as the direct consequences of a poem or a speech or a writing of revolutionary writers. This conspiracy case, known as Secunderabad Conspiracy Case, was filed in May 1974 and ended in acquittal in February 1989, after 15 years of prolonged and tiresome trial. In connection with the Conspiracy Case, Rao was arrested in May 1974. He was denied bail several times and finally released on conditional bail in April 1975. Rao was arrested again on 26 June 1975, on the eve of proclamation of Indian Emergency.

=== 1980s: Labour Movement and Arrests ===
In 1985, Rao was one of 46 persons accused of attempting to overthrow the Andhra Pradesh Government in the Secunderabad Conspiracy Case. He was arrested in connection with this case, but subsequently released. Rao was also one of those arrested in the Ramnagar conspiracy case, and accused of attending a meeting in which there was a plan made to assassinate two police officials. Seventeen years later, in 2003, he was completely acquitted of all charges in relation to this case.

After Varavara Rao went to jail, his interviews were restricted and under severe surveillance. His mail, including registered newspapers, was censored for months together. He was implicated in two more cases while he was in jail. After a stifling repression period between 1985 and 1989 under the Telugu Desam Party rule, the newly elected Indian National Congress government allowed a little relaxation for a short period after December 1989.

In May 1990, Rao spoke at an event organised by the Andhra Pradesh Raitu Coolie Sanghama labourers' political party which holds an annual conference for laborers and peasants in Hyderabad. 1.2. million people attended the event, in which Rao spoke about providing land rights to farm laborers and workers.

=== 2004: Peace Emissary to Naxals ===
In 2001, the Telugu Desam government in Andhra Pradesh accepted a proposal to have peace negotiations with members of two banned organisations, Communist Party of India (Maoist) and People's War. Varavara Rao, Kalyana Rao and Gaddar were accepted by both sides as peace emissaries, to establish the conditions under which the peace agreement would be negotiated. Rao called for a partial lifting of the ban on these organisations in order to facilitate peace talks, and advocated a peaceful resolution of the ongoing conflict. Three meetings to negotiate a resolution to the conflict were held; however, Rao and the other emissaries resigned from their positions before the fourth scheduled meeting, citing the fact that the Naxal parties had pulled out of negotiations and that the State government had not, in their view, participated in good faith.

Rao noted that there were five police encounters during the negotiations, in which members of the banned parties were killed despite a temporary cease-fire. His efforts were subsequently lauded by the then-Home Minister for the State of Andhra Pradesh, K Jana Reddy who wrote to Prime Minister Narendra Modi in 2020 asking him to grant bail to an unwell, imprisoned Rao and, noting that, "As the then Home Minister I carried the responsibility of holding peace talks between the then AP government and Naxal parties in the year 2004 October. Mr Rao played a significant role in creating cordial climate in conducting these peace talks and was genuinely interested in bringing peace in the state.”

=== 1990s–2010s: Telangana Movement ===
Varavara Rao, along with a number of organisations stood in the forefront in exposing and resisting the pro-globalisation and liberalisation policies of Chandrababu Naidu who came to power in 1994. During Chandrababu Naidu's government, three Central Committee members of Communist Party of India (Marxist-Leninist) Peoples War were arrested in Bangalore and killed. Within 24 hours of imposition of ban on Virasam, Varavara Rao and Kalyana Rao, were arrested on 19 August 2005 under AP Public Security Act and sent to Chanchalguda Central Prison in Hyderabad. Since his arrest, 7 new cases were charged against him. Apart from an earlier case from 1999 (pertaining to a protest meeting against the killings of three top leaders of Peoples War), and the case regarding the ban on Virasam, the remaining six cases pertain to the period of talks between the government and the Naxalites. When the government revoked the AP Public Security Act against Virasam through GO Ms No. 503 of 11 November 2005, the cases against Varavara Rao and Kalyana Rao should have become redundant. In the normal course, Public Prosecutor should have informed the court about the redundancy of the cases. However, that order has not reached the court and Varavara Rao and Kalyana Rao had to undergo a number of adjournments of the case after the lifting of the ban. Finally, the court struck down the case on Varavara Rao under the Public Security Act on 31 March 2006 and he obtained bail for all other cases by the time. He was released from jail under bail on 31 March 2006 after a period of about eight months.

In 2010, police ordered the arrest of Rao on the basis of a speech that he made at a convention in Delhi, concerning the state of Kashmir. A First Information Report was registered against Rao, along with writer Arundhati Roy, professor S.A.R. Geelani, who was acquitted in the Parliament attack case, and several Kashmir University professors.

In 2011, Maoist leader Kishenji was killed in an encounter with police. Rao criticised the police for the encounter, claiming that he had seen the body and that it showed distinct signs of torture. In 2011, Rao was one of several persons accused in a case concerning a bomb placed near the car of a police superintendent in Ongole.

Rao was an active participant in the Telangana movement, which aimed for the creation the separate state of Telangana, by bifurcating the existing state of Andhra Pradesh. Although the state of Telangana was formed in 2014, Rao was arrested in 2018 while paying homage, along with others, at a memorial for those killed during the movement.

=== 2018: Elgaar Parishad case ===
On 28 August 2018, Rao was arrested in his home in Hyderabad for his alleged involvement in the Bhima-Koregaon violence that occurred on 1 January 2018. A First Information Report filed concerning that event alleged that on the 200th anniversary of the battle of Bhima-Koregaon, a program called the Elgaar Parishad had been organised in which designated terrorist left wing groups such as Communist Party of India (Maoist) and Naxalites had funded and participated. The police alleged that the speeches made at this event, including those by Rao and others, were responsible for inciting violence that occurred the next day. Some reports also suggest that there was an alleged plot to assassinate Prime Minister Narendra Modi discussed at this event. These appear to be based a letter obtained by the police which refers to a person only identified as "R". Rao denied any involvement in the alleged plot.

=== Covid-19 and NHRC Intervention ===
During Rao's detention in Taloja Jail in Maharashtra, he was hospitalised and admitted to J.J. Hospital in Mumbai. Following this, a special court ordered a report on his health while detained. In June 2020, Rao applied again for bail, on the grounds that he was highly vulnerable to Covid-19, and following a government recommendation that elderly inmates and those with co-morbidities should be released from jail in light of the Covid-19 pandemic, but were unsuccessful. His application for bail was supported by fourteen Members of Parliament, who wrote a letter to Maharashtra Chief Minister Uddhav Thackeray, raising concerns about his health as well as jail conditions during the Covid-19 pandemic in India. It was also supported by two former Chief Election Commissioners of India, who raised doubts about the alleged conspiracy case, and called on the NIA to share information with the Mumbai Police regarding the case.

On 16 July, Rao was re-admitted to J.J. Hospital in Mumbai, where he tested positive for Covid-19. Following reports that Rao had been injured again while in the care of the hospital, resulting in a head injury, the National Human Rights Commission ordered that he be moved to a private facility for medical treatment. Rao was then shifted to Nanavati Hospital in Mumbai. The NIA opposed Rao's plea for bail in court, arguing that he was trying to "take undue advantage" of the Covid-19 pandemic, although the hospital confirmed that Rao had tested positive for Covid-19 and was undergoing treatment. Bombay High Court disapproved of the stance taken by the NIA and granted him a medical bail.

==== Grant of bail ====
Rao and others currently face charges under the Unlawful Activities Prevention Act, and attempts to bail Rao out, on grounds of his failing health, finally came to fruition as the Bombay High Court granted him a six-month bail on medical grounds and disapproved the stand of the National Investigation Agency (NIA) in February 2022. On 10 August 2022, the Supreme Court converted the temporary bail granted to by the Bombay High Court to permanent bail, on medical grounds, citing both, his ill health as well as the fact that he had complied with all the temporary bail conditions, as the reason.

== See also ==
- Stan Swamy
- Vernon Gonsalves
