= B. G. Kolse Patil =

Indian social activist and former judge (born 1942)

- बी. जी. कोळसे पाटील
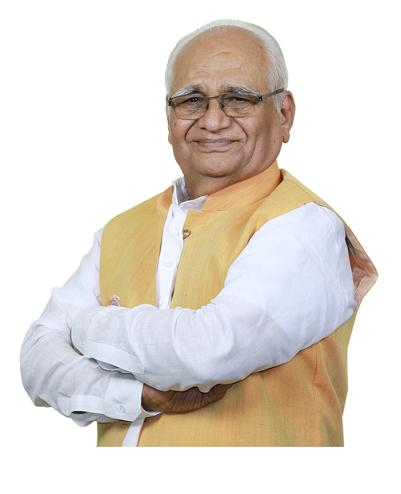
- Born: Baban Gangadhar Kolse-Patil; 18 September 1942; Ahmednagar, Maharashtra state

B. G. Kolse Patil is an Indian social reformer and former judge of the Mumbai High Court (Bombay High Court in India. In the year 2014, he along with Supreme Court Justice P. B. Sawant started Lokshasan Andolan Party a Political party to transform Bharat. He has made contribution for transforming Nation by providing "educational facility" to "Tribal & Native" students of Bharat. One such educational facility is spread across 25 acres of Land in Maharashtra state. This facility provides free Quality Education, Healthy Food, Ancient Bharatiya(Indian)Culture, Patriotic, Ethical Principles and adds value to nation Bharat by creating Nations Future Scientists, Innovators. He has participated in several protests such as: Anti Enron protests, protest against Jaitapur Nuclear Power Project.

== Early life and education ==
B. G. Kolse Patil was born on 18 September 1942, in the village of Guha, Ahmednagar (in present-day Maharashtra state). His parents were landless farm laborers, who worked on the fields of the local landlord for daily wages. He attended a local primary school till 7th grade, after which he dropped out because his parents couldn't afford the high school fees. He worked as a farm-hand for five years and rejoined high school when the government high school in Ahmednagar started providing free secondary education. He completed his education till 12th grade and thereafter attained a B.Sc. degree, supporting his education by working as a daily wage worker and doing several odd jobs. After B.Sc., he secured an appointment as a school teacher in Khadakwasala near Pune. While working as a teacher, he completed his Bachelor of Laws degree from the Law College in Pune and specialized in criminal law thereafter.

== Legal career ==
His career as a lawyer was fairly successful and he gained fame due to his role in a few high-profile trials like the Manwath murder case.He joined the Pune bar council in 1973. In that capacity, he raised the issue of relaxing the judicial entry age limit by ten years for backward castes and five years for all categories. He was appointed district public prosecutor in 1981 by the government of Maharashtra and continued in that role till 1985. In 1985, at the age of 43, he was appointed as judge of the Bombay High Court.

During his judicial tenure, he delivered strict judgments against tax and octroi evaders. His judgement in "Kanjilal Premjit vs Range Forest Officer" led to an amendment to the Forest Act which held saw-mill owners liable to punishment for buying illegally chopped timber. Another of his notable judgments was in the case of "Associated Bearings Pvt. Ltd. vs the Union of India"; he held that taxes evaded by exploiting loopholes should not be retrospectively refunded by the government to corporations because the corporations do not refund the consumers and effectively pass the tax burden to them. His difference of opinion with Justice Shah, in that case, is widely cited in the legal literature. He was also instrumental in getting the government to institute the Aurangabad Bench of the Bombay High Court.

He resigned prematurely from the judiciary in 1990 to pursue social activism full-time.

== Activism ==
After leaving the judiciary, he founded the Lokshashan Andolan (People's Democratic Movement). He has been associated with another former judge-turned-activist Justice P.B. Sawant (former judge of the Supreme Court of India). He spearheaded various grassroots movements throughout Maharashtra. Most of the movements were for social and economic justice for rural, Adivasi, small farmers and displaced people. Notable movements among them include:

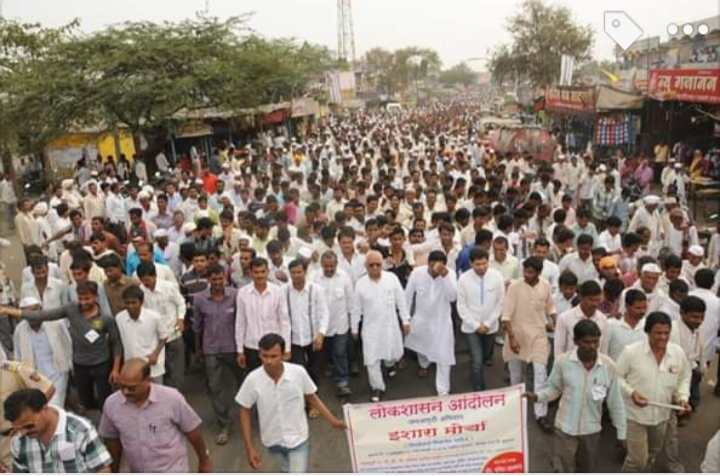
An agitation march of landless and small farmers in Maharashtra, led by B. G. Kolse-Patil

- Anti Enron protests in Maharashtra in the late 1990s. In 1997, he was arrested under section 151 of the CrPC to prevent him and his associates from taking part in the planned hunger strike against Dhabol Power project.
- Movement of farmers and Adivasis against the Alibag SEZ in the 2000s
- Protest against the Dow chemicals plant in Shinde-Vasuli near Pune
- Movement against the Jaitapur Nuclear Power Project in Konkan

Besides popular movements, he has been part of fact-finding teams which have investigated several matters of civil rights and social justice, such as:

- Fact-finding team investigating Khairlanji murder case in 2006
- Rehabilitation and resettlement of Manibeli Oustees Sardar Sarovar project inquiry report (Inquiry into the status of Manibeli Oustees conducted by him on behalf of Indian People's Tribunal on Environment & Human Rights)
- Concerned Citizens Inquiry on the Nanded blast in February 2007

For his role in these people movements, he was kept under surveillance and profiled by the private surveillance company Stratfor, which had been hired by Dow Chemicals. This was revealed when WikiLeaks released the Stratfor papers.

== Politics ==
In March 2019, he announced his candidature for the 2019 Lok Sabha election from Aurangabad on behalf of the opposition alliance called Vanchit Bahujan Aghadi (VBA) (Front of the Deprived Majority) on a Janata Dal (Secular) ticket with support from the Congress. However, he withdrew support to VBA when VBA decided to hand over Aurangabad constituency to AIMIM.
