= Gaur Chakraborty =

Indian politician

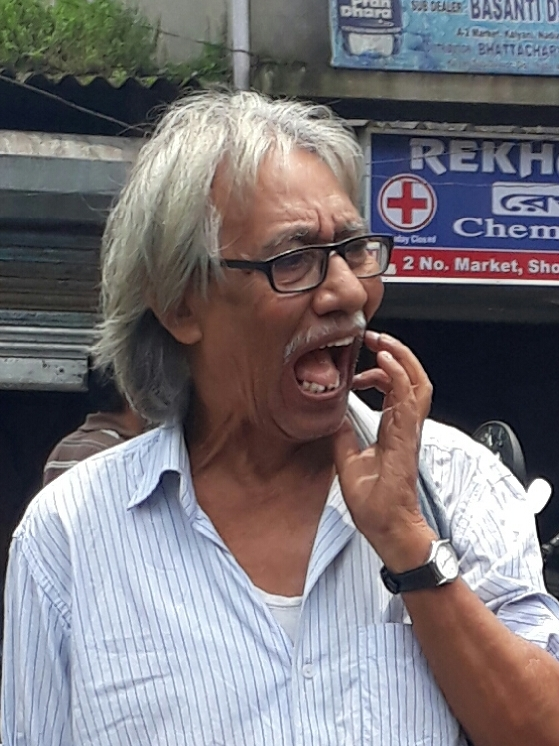
- Gaur Chakraborty
- Born: 1944 or 1945 (age 81–82)
- Occupation: Spokesperson of Communist Party of India (Maoist)
- Organization: Communist Party of India (Maoist)
- Known for: Far-left politics
- Movement: Singur-Nandigram land movement Lalgarh movement
- Spouse: Mukta Keshi

Gaur Chakraborty alias Gour Narayan Chakraborty is the former spokesperson of West Bengal State committee of the Communist Party of India (Maoist). He is one of the senior most person in India who was arrested and detained under Unlawful Activities (Prevention) Act. After seven years of incarceration he was acquitted of all charges under the UAPA.

== Political life ==
Chakraborty worked in the Eastern Railway hawkers union led by Left politics. He was associated with the Communist Party of India before 1967 and later joined the Communist Party of India (Marxist). In the early 70s in West Bengal, he maintained his contacts with Naxal leaders but did not leave the CPI(M). Next three decades, he was attached with Revolutionary Democratic Front (RDF) and various fractions of the Communist Party of India (Marxist–Leninist) as well as civil society movement in West Bengal. He became active in Singur and Nandigram movements at the time of Left Front (West Bengal) Government and played a crucial role in uniting urban support bases in favour of the tribal upsurge in Jangalmahal, the three Left wing extremism affected districts of Bankura, Purulia and Paschim Medinipur. In the time of Lalgarh movement, the CPI (Maoist) declared his name as outfit official spokesperson.

== Arrest ==
On 23 June 2009 just immediately after the then Chief Minister Buddhadeb Bhattacharjee's announcement to implement the ban on the CPI (Maoist) in the state of West Bengal, Kolkata Police arrested Chakraborty as he emerged from the office of a private TV channel in Kolkata after giving them an interview. He was charged with several offences including under section 20 of the Unlawful Activities (Prevention) Act or UAPA. In October 2012 Chakraborty was admitted to Bangur Institute of Neurosciences after a cardiac arrest in Presidency jail.

== Acquittal ==
The City Sessions judge of the Bankshall Court, Kolkata acquitted Mr. Chakraborty of all the charges on 19 July 2016. The prosecution could not substantiate the charges brought against him and he was set free from jail after 7 years imprisonment when he was 78.
