= Stan Swamy =

Indian Roman Catholic priest and tribal rights activist (1937–2021)

The Reverend Stanislaus Lourduswamy SJ
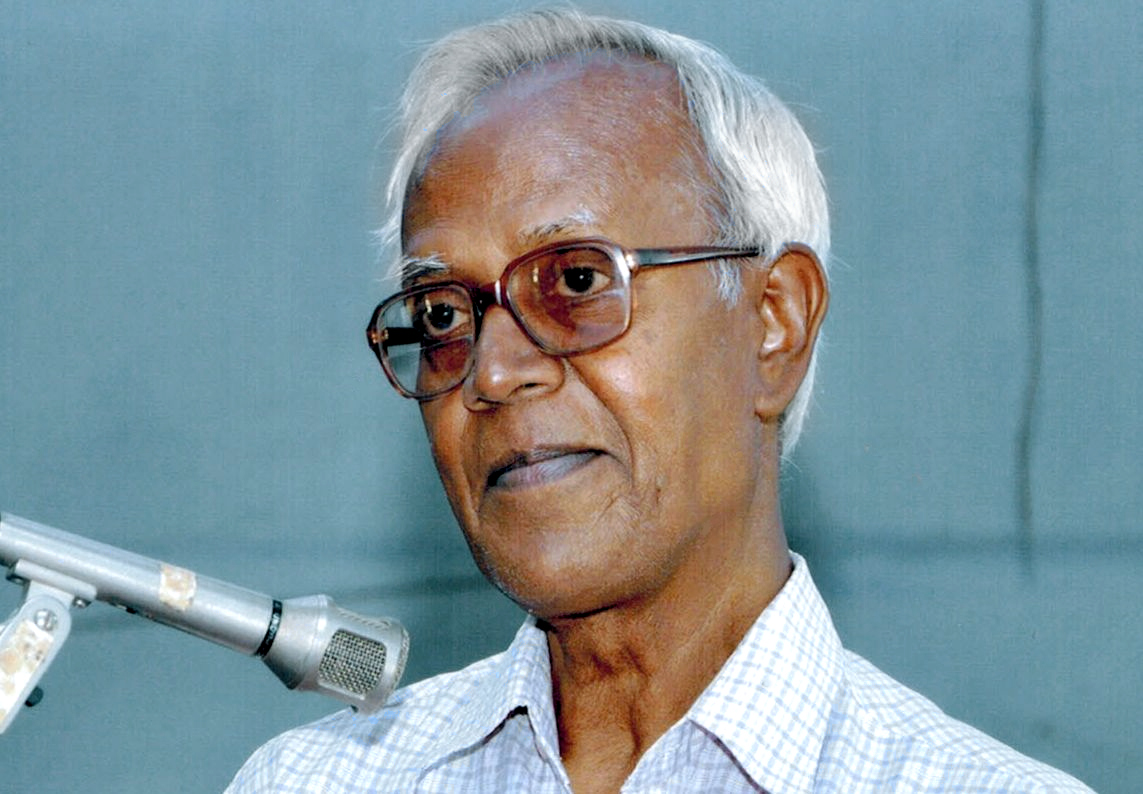
- Swamy in 2010
- Church: Catholic Church (Society of Jesus)

Orders
- Ordination: 14 April 1970

Personal details
- Born: Stanislaus Lourduswamy; 26 April 1937 Viragalur, Trichinopoly District, Madras Province, British India (now Tiruchirappalli district, Tamil Nadu, India)
- Died: 5 July 2021 (aged 84) Mumbai, Maharashtra, India
- Occupation: Catholic priest, Tribal rights activist
- Education: University of Manila (Philippines)

Director of Indian Social Institute, Bangalore
- In office 1975–1986
- Preceded by: Fr. Henry Volken SJ
- Succeeded by: Fr. Dominic George SJ

Stanislaus Lourduswamy, SJ (26 April 1937 – 5 July 2021), popularly known as Stan Swamy, was an Indian Catholic Jesuit priest, and a tribal rights activist for several decades. Swamy was the oldest person to be accused of terrorism in India.

On 8 October 2020, Swamy was arrested and charged by the National Investigation Agency under the Unlawful Activities (Prevention) Act, for his alleged role in the 2018 Bhima Koregaon violence and links to the Communist Party of India (Maoist). Swamy was suffering from Parkinson's disease and had requested bail on medical grounds, which was rejected multiple times. While incarcerated, his health deteriorated and he died on 5 July 2021.

== Life ==
=== Early life and education ===
Swamy was born on 26 April 1937 in Viragalur, a village in present-day Tiruchirappalli district, Tamil Nadu, India.

He later joined the Jesuits and in the 1970s, he studied theology and received a master's degree in sociology in the Philippines, where he encountered a series of protests and demonstrations against the administration. During his further studies, he made friends with Brazilian archbishop Hélder Câmara, whose work with poor people influenced him.

=== Activism ===
Swamy was the director of the Jesuit-run Indian Social Institute, Bangalore, from 1975 to 1986. He worked among the tribals of central India for over three decades and had questioned the non-implementation of the Fifth Schedule of the Constitution, which stipulates setting up of a Tribes Advisory Council with members solely of the Adivasi community for their protection, well-being and development in the state.

In a video circulated two days ahead of his arrest, Swamy suggested his arrest was linked to his work, as it involved dissent against government policies. He said

What is happening to me is not something unique happening to me alone. It is a broader process that is taking place all over the country. We are all aware how prominent intellectuals, lawyers writers, poets, activists, students, leaders, they are all put into jail because they have expressed their dissent or raised questions about the ruling powers of India. We are part of the process. In a way I am happy to be part of this process. I am not a silent spectator, but part of the game, and ready to pay the price whatever be it.

While incarcerated in Taloja Central Jail, in a letter to a Jesuit colleague, Swamy highlighted the plight of the prisoners stating, "Many of such poor undertrials don't know what charges have been put on them, have not seen their chargesheet and just remain in prison for years without any legal or other assistance." He ended the letter saying, "But we will still sing in chorus. A caged bird can still sing."

=== Arrest ===
Swamy was implicated in the 2018 Bhima Koregaon violence, while he claimed that he was not in Pune during the said period, and he was accused of being a Maoist "sympathiser". It was alleged that the Persecuted Prisoners Solidarity Committee (PPSC) founded by him and Sudha Bharadwaj, "to fight for the release of around 3,000 men and women who have been labelled as Maoists and imprisoned", was a front for Maoist fundraising. The Jesuits denied the allegation of Swamy being a Maoist, by stating that it was against the ethos of the Jesuit order. He was arrested by the NIA on 8 October 2020, from Bagaicha, a Jesuit social action centre, and charged under the Unlawful Activities (Prevention) Act, 1967, under which bail can be denied. The case was initially investigated by the Pune Police but later handed over to the NIA. He had earlier been arrested in June 2018 in Ranchi on similar accusations. Activists Vernon Gonsalves and Arun Ferreira were also lodged at Taloja prison along with Swamy.

Swamy's arrest triggered widespread protests across India. The People's Union for Civil Liberties (PUCL), All India Catholic Union, the Catholic Bishops Conference of India, Kerala Catholic Bishops' Conference (KCBC), Kerala Latin Catholic Association (KLCA), Kerala Jesuit Provincial, Federation of Asian Bishops' Conferences (FABC), and the international Jesuit community, all protested, calling for his release. The Ranchi Catholic Church released a statement saying it was "distressed and troubled" at the way he was arrested. The arrests were termed as politically motivated due to his work among the adivasi community, the release of undertrials, Persecuted Prisoners Solidarity Committee, among others. Leaders of other minority religions also protested his arrest. In a protest on 21 October 2020, leaders of opposition political parties such as Shashi Tharoor, Sitaram Yechury, D. Raja, Supriya Sule and Kanimozhi along with economist Jean Dreze, Dr Joseph Marianus Kujur, the director of the Ranchi-based Xavier Institute of Social Sciences, activists Dayamani Barla and Rupali Jadhav, and lawyer Mihir Desai called for Stan's release. Jharkhand Chief minister Hemant Soren and Kerala Chief Minister Pinarayi Vijayan both objected to Swamy's arrest.

In October 2020, Swamy filed for bail on the grounds of him being a victim of Parkinson's disease. His bail pleas were rejected multiple times.

On 6 November 2020, Swamy submitted an application to the special court requesting a straw and sipper, stating that he was unable to hold a glass due to Parkinson's. In response to the delay in arranging a straw and a sipper for Swamy, social media users protested by ordering straws and sippers online, getting them delivered to the NIA's Mumbai office and at the Taloja jail.

=== Illness and death ===
Swamy suffered from Parkinson's disease and other age-related illnesses. He fell multiple times while in prison. He suffered from hearing loss in both ears and had undergone surgeries. Due to his Parkinson's, he had trouble holding a glass, and requested to be provided with a sipper and a straw while imprisoned.

On 18 May 2021, in a note submitted to the Bombay High Court, it was reported that Swamy was gravely ill in prison. The Court ordered the formation of an expert committee to examine Swamy. While appearing before the Court over video conferencing on 21 May 2021, Swamy refused to be admitted to either JJ hospital or any other hospital and requested only interim bail so that he could go to his home in Ranchi, citing his rapidly deteriorating health. On 28 May 2021, the Bombay High Court directed the Maharashtra government to admit Swamy to a private hospital for 15 days, considering his rapidly deteriorating health. He was admitted to the Holy Family Hospital, Mumbai. Swamy then tested positive for COVID-19.

On 4 July 2021, Swamy was put on ventilator support, as his health deteriorated. He died on 5 July 2021, ahead of his bail hearing in Bombay High Court.

In November 2021, Jamshedpur Jesuit Province (JJP) petitioned the Bombay High Court, as his next-of-kin, to clear Swamy's name from the case. His counsel while appealing the Bombay High Court, to set aside NIA observation against him, had submitted, "It is strongly believed by those closest to him that his death was caused (in view of his age and past health conditions) due to his arrest and prison conditions including inadequate health facilities and health care". HC asked the petition to be resubmitted.

The Washington Post reported in December 2022 that hackers had planted evidence on Swamy's computer.

== Awards ==
In January 2021, Swamy was awarded the Mukundan C. Menon award 2020 for human rights.

In June 2022 the Martin Ennals Foundation, Geneva posthumously conferred the Human Rights Defenders award 2022 to Stan Swamy.
