= Krishna Bharadwaj (economist) =

Indian economist

- Born: Krishna Chandavarkar; 21 August 1935; Karwar, Kingdom of Mysore (present-day Karnataka)
- Died: 8 March 1992 (aged 56)
- Spouse: Ranganath Bharadwaj

Academic background
- Education: Ruia College, Mumbai, Mumbai University

Krishna Bharadwaj (21 August 1935 – 8 March 1992) was an Indian Neo-Ricardian economist mainly known for her contributions to the economic development theory and the revival of the ideas of classical economics. She believed that economic theory should be based on concepts which can be observed and be amenable to measurement in reality.

== Early life and education ==
Bharadwaj was born on 21 August 1935 in Karwar, Karnataka, into a Konkani Saraswat Brahmin family. She was the youngest of the six children of M. S. Chandravarkar, a teacher in a local college, and his wife Shantabai.

The family shifted to Belgaum in 1939, and Bhardwaj was schooled in that city. She learnt Hindustani classical music and won many local competitions by the age of fifteen. In 1952, after her father's death, the family moved to Mumbai, where Bharadwaj attended Ruia college and graduated with a first class degree in economics. She then took a master's degree and then completed a Ph.D. in Transport Economics in 1960. Her critical orientation towards the Economic Theory began with her involvement in development theory as a doctoral student.

== Career ==
In 1960, Piero Sraffa's Production of Commodities by Means of Commodities was published. Bharadwaj was asked by the then editor Sachin Chaudhuri of Economic Weekly to review the book. She solved this task brilliantly, which then formed the prelude to her further scientific work.

In 1961, Bharadwaj joined the Center for International Studies to work on problems of planning and development with critical perceptions.

In 1967, she went to Cambridge as a visiting fellow and came under the influence of Piero Sraffa and going on to become one of his closest disciples.

Bharadwaj promoted the teaching of different economic approaches in Centre for Economic Studies and Planning (CESP) at Jawaharlal Nehru University (JNU), such as classical, Marxian, Keynesian as well as Walrasian. She held the Chair of Economics at the university. She edited the collected papers of economist Pierro Sraffa at the University of Cambridge, England. She contributed to numerous journals and forums and is well known as a leading light among development economists. The Indian Economic Journal has a symposium in June 2021, Political Economy for the Present Century, with extensive treatment of her research.

== Personal life ==
The activist and trade unionist, Sudha Bharadwaj, is her daughter.

== Books and papers ==
- 1960: Techniques of Transportation Planning, with Special Reference to Railways
- Collection of essays from 1989 were printed in Australian Economic Papers, and the Cambridge Journal of Economics.
- Authored Labour Markets, Employment Policies and the Dynamics of Development.
- Authored Production Conditions in Indian Agriculture: A Study Based on Farm Management Surveys (Department of Applied Economics Occasional Papers)
- Authored Classical Political Economy and Rise to Dominance of Supply and Demand Theories (1978-1986)
- Authored Accumulation, Exchange and Development: Essays on the Indian Economy
- Edited Perspectives on Capitalism: Marx, Keynes, Schumpeter and Weber with Sudipta Kaviraj.
- Themes in Value and Distribution: Classical Theory Reappraised. London 1989. ISBN 0-04-338148-0
- Essays in Honor of Piero Sraffa. (edited, together with Bertram Schefold ). 2nd Ed. Routledge: London 1992.ISBN 0-04-445254-3
