= Unlawful Activities (Prevention) Act, 1967 =

Indian law to prevent unlawful activities

Parliament of India
- Long title: An Act to provide for the effective prevention of certain unlawful activities of individuals and associations and for matters connected therewith.
- Citation: Act No. 37 of 1967
- Territorial extent: India
- Enacted by: Parliament of India
- Assented to: 30 December 1967

Amended by
- The Unlawful Activities (Prevention) Amendment Act, 1969 (24 of 1969); The Criminal Law (Amendment) Act, 1972 (31 of 1972); The Delegated Legislation Provisions (Amendment) Act, 1986 (4 of 1986); The Unlawful Activities (Prevention) Amendment Act, 2004 (29 of 2004); The Unlawful Activities (Prevention) Amendment Act, 2008 (35 of 2008); The Unlawful Activities (Prevention) Amendment Act, 2019 (28 of 2019)
- Status: In force

The Unlawful Activities (Prevention) Act, 1967 is an Indian law aimed at the prevention of unlawful activities associations in India. Its main objective was to make powers available for dealing with activities directed against the integrity and sovereignty of India. The most recent amendment of the law, the Unlawful Activities (Prevention) Amendment Act, 2019 (UAPA 2019) has made it possible for the Union Government to designate individuals as terrorists without following any formal judicial process. UAPA is also known as the "Anti-terror law".

The National Integration Council appointed a Committee on National Integration and Regionalisation to look into the aspect of putting reasonable restrictions in the interests of the sovereignty and integrity of India. The agenda of the NIC limited itself to communalism, casteism and regionalism and not terrorism. Pursuant to the acceptance of recommendations of the committee, the Constitution (Sixteenth Amendment) Act, 1963 was enacted to impose, by law, reasonable restrictions in the interests of the sovereignty and integrity of India. In 2019, the BJP led NDA government claimed that in order to implement the provisions of 1963 Act, the Unlawful Activities (Prevention) Bill was introduced in the Parliament.

United Nations special rapporteurs stated that the provisions of the UAPA 2019, contravenes several articles of the Universal Declaration of Human Rights and the International Covenant on Civil and Political Rights. BBC News has reported that people arrested and charged with UAPA find it harder to get bail.

== History ==
Pursuant to the acceptance by Government of a unanimous recommendation of the Committee on National Integration and Regionalism appointed by the National Integration Council, the Constitution (Sixteenth Amendment) Act, 1963, was enacted empowering Parliament to impose, by law, reasonable restrictions in the interests of sovereignty and integrity of India, on the:

1. Freedom of Speech and Expression;
2. Right to Assemble peaceably and without arms; AND
3. Right to Form Associations or Unions.

The object of this bill was to make powers available for dealing with activities directed against the integrity and sovereignty of India. The bill was passed by both the Houses of Parliament and received the assent of the President on 30 December 1967. The Amending Acts are as follows:

1. The Unlawful Activities (Prevention) Amendment Act, 1969
2. The Criminal Law (Amendment) Act, 1972
3. The Delegated Legislation Provisions (Amendment) Act, 1986
4. The Unlawful Activities (Prevention) Amendment Act, 2004
5. The Unlawful Activities (Prevention) Amendment Act, 2008
6. The Unlawful Activities (Prevention) Amendment Act, 2012
7. The Unlawful Activities (Prevention) Amendment Act, 2019

This last Amendment was enacted after POTA was withdrawn by the Parliament. However, in the Amendment Act in 2004, most of provisions of POTA were re-incorporated. In 2008, after Mumbai attacks, it was further strengthened. The most recent amendment has been done in 2019. According to the statement of objects and reasons, the Bill amends the Unlawful Activities (Prevention) Act, 1967 to make it more effective in preventing unlawful activities, and meet commitments made at the Financial Action Task Force (an intergovernmental organization to combat money laundering and terrorism financing). In July 2019, the ambit of UAPA was expanded. It was amended allowing the government to designate an individual as a terrorist without trial. The previous versions of the Bill allowed for only groups to be designated as terrorists.

In a ruling passed on 1 February 2021, the Supreme Court of India ruled that bail could be granted to accused if the right to speedy trial was violated. In another significant judgement in 2023, the Supreme Court ruled that "membership of an unlawful organisation" constituted an offence under UAPA.

== Unlawful Activities (Prevention) Amendment Act, 2019 ==
The Unlawful Activities (Prevention) Amendment Bill, 2019 was introduced in Lok Sabha by the Minister of Home Affairs, Amit Shah, on 8 July 2019. The Bill amends the Unlawful Activities (Prevention) Act, 1967. The Act provides special procedures to deal with terrorist activities, among other things. The act was passed in the Lok Sabha on 24 July and Rajya Sabha on 2 August. It received the assent of the president on 8 August.

PRS Legislative Research explained the act below:

Who may commit terrorism: Under the Act, the central government may designate an organisation as a terrorist organisation if it:

(i) commits or participates in acts of terrorism,
(ii) prepares for terrorism,
(iii) promotes terrorism, or
(iv) is otherwise involved in terrorism.

The Bill additionally empowers the government to designate individuals as terrorists on the same grounds.

Approval for seizure of property by NIA: Under the Act, an investigating officer is required to obtain the prior approval of the Director General of Police to seize properties that may be connected with terrorism. The Bill adds that if the investigation is conducted by an officer of the National Investigation Agency (NIA), the approval of the Director General of NIA would be required for seizure of such property.

Investigation by NIA: Under the Act, investigation of cases may be conducted by officers of the rank of Deputy Superintendent or Assistant Commissioner of Police or above. The Bill additionally empowers the officers of the NIA, of the rank of Inspector or above, to investigate cases.

Insertion to schedule of treaties: The Act defines terrorist acts to include acts committed within the scope of any of the treaties listed in a schedule to the Act. The Schedule lists nine treaties, including the Convention for the Suppression of Terrorist Bombings (1997), and the Convention against Taking of Hostages (1979). The Bill also adds another treaty to the list. This is the International Convention for Suppression of Acts of Nuclear Terrorism (2005).

== Mechanism ==
For prosecution under Section 13 of the UAPA, the permission of the Ministry of Home Affairs (MHA) is required. However, for prosecution under Sections 16, 17 and 18, the permission of the respective State government is required. Section 25 allows the NIA to seize property it considers to be proceeds of terrorism, with the written consent of the Director General of Police (DGP) of the State. However, it is possible for the NIA officer to obtain the consent of the DGP of the NIA thus bypassing the State DGP. The police normally have 60 to 90 days to investigate a case and submit a charge-sheet failing which the accused may obtain default bail. However, under the UAPA, this pre-charge sheet time is extended to 180 days. Further, normal bail rules do not apply to an accused under Section 43(d)5 of the UAPA.

== Criticism ==
UAPA is criticized for its low conviction rate, which is around 2%. According to the data shared by the Union Government, in the period 2016 to 2020, 5,027 cases were registered under the act against 24,134 individuals. Only 212 of the 24,134 people were convicted and 386 were acquitted. This means, in the years 2016-2020, 97.5% of the people arrested under UAPA remain under prison awaiting trial.

In July 2019 while introducing the Unlawful Activities (Prevention) Amendment Bill, 2019 the BJP led Union Government claimed that the bill would give it power to probe terror attacks on India, the Opposition parties in the Lok Sabha termed it draconian. The Opposition claimed that the Bill did not contain any provisions to prevent misuse. Specifically, the power to designate an individual as a terrorist before being proven guilty by trial, was criticised. Critics of the UAPA consider the definitions of "terrorist", "like to threaten" and "likely to strike terror" to be very broad and open to misuse by the police as the burden of proof of innocence is on the accused. The example of Gaur Chakraborty among others is cited wherein he spent 7 years in prison during trial only to be acquitted of all charges, wherein the imprisonment during trial itself amounted to punishment.

In 2020, United Nations special rapporteurs stated that the provisions of the UAPA 2019, contravenes several articles of the Universal Declaration of Human Rights and the International Covenant on Civil and Political Rights.

Lawyer Rongeet Poddar wrote in the Oxford Human Rights Hub, that UAPA 2019 has made it possible for the Union Government to designate individuals as terrorists without a due process of law. He wrote, "Neither the Amendment Bill nor the parent statute provides a concrete definition of terrorism. This opens a Pandora's box. Categorization as a 'terrorist' by the executive bears serious consequences, such as social boycott or loss of employment." Such labeling by the executive could lead to mob lynching by the vigilante groups in India. Calling it a "colourable legislation which bears the potential for abuse by the executive", he noted that the constitutionality of the act should be contested. He wrote, the UAPA 2019 "echoes laws made under the colonial regime to crush the freedom movement in the garb of ensuring public order."

As part of the K. G. Kannabiran Lectures on Law, Justice and Human Rights, Senior Advocate Mihir Desai in a lecture titled, "The Problem Of Preventive Detention in India", delivered on 23 November 2020, stated

"Preventive detention laws and special legislations like UAPA -- anti-terror laws as they are called -- allow the state to carve out exception for its own lawlessness. These are the laws which permit the state to claim that we are governed by the rule of law and on the other hand pass such legislations which violate the rule of law altogether. These are the laws which go against the basic tenets of the constitution, such as freedom, equality, right to life, liberty etc. It therefore becomes important to look at these laws which gives an exceptional power to the state over citizens -- to arrest them, to detain them, to charge them with offences which otherwise they may not be able to charge them with, keep them behind bars for years together, and also for ensuring that dissent in all forms is crushed."

On 25 July 2021, Justice Aftab Alam, former Supreme Court judge spoke on a webinar titled "Discussion On Democracy, Dissent and Draconian Law – Should UAPA & Sedition Have A Place In Our Statute Books?". In the discussion, he called UAPA a "draconian law" and said that it was the UAPA that caused the death of Father Stan Swamy without a trial. Stan Swamy was an activist that was charged with UAPA for his alleged role in the 2018 Bhima Koregaon violence and links to the Communist Party of India (Maoist) and later died in prison due to COVID-19. Alam further stated that UAPA has a realistic conviction rate of 2%. He further stated that this law can lead to situations where case may fail but the accused would have been incarcerated for 8 to 12 years. He said in such cases, the case may have no legs to stand on but the accused has suffered and he concluded that in such cases the process becomes the punishment.

In June 2021, Delhi High Court called out UAPA misuse by the Union government by observing the state had broadened the scope of "terrorist activity" to include ordinary penal offences.

While the misuse of the law has been constantly debated, Police was also criticized for not invoking UAPA in some cases like the Haridwar hate speech case.

On 20 January 2022, BBC called the UAPA a draconian anti-terror law and reported that many protestors and journalists were arrested, detained or charged with UAPA. UAPA had made it harder for the accused to get bail. The PM Narendra Modi-led BJP Union Government has been accused of misusing UAPA to stifle dissent and target minorities in India.

== Notable individuals charged under the Act ==
Between 2014 and 2020, 10,552 people were arrested under UAPA.

Notable individuals charged under the act and their current status
Name	Notes	Charge	Year	Current Status
Kobad Ghandy		Sedition for Naxalite insurgency, UAPA	2009	Acquitted in 2016
Arun Ferreira	Human Rights Activist		2007; Rearrested 2018	Acquitted in 2012; Since August 2018, lodged in Taloja prison
Binayak Sen	Doctor and Human rights activist		2007	
Mamman Khan	Politician	Accused of involvement in terrorist activity by instigating the 2023 Haryana riots in Nuh.	2024	
Gaur Chakraborty	Incarcerated for 7 years	Accused of involvement in terrorist activity and member of banned organisation	2009	Acquitted of charges in 2016
K K Shahina	Journalist	Booked for threatening complainants in connection with a story revealing lapses in Karnataka Police investigation.	December 2010	Anticipatory bail in July 2011
G.N. Saibaba	Scholar, writer, human rights activist and professor	Sentence to life for having Maoist link.		Acquitted by the Supreme court in 2024.
Kamran Yousuf	Photojournalist	Arrested in alleged terror funding case	2017	Acquitted from all charges in March 2022.
Thirumurugan Gandhi	Human Rights Activist, founder - May 17 Movement		2018	
Sudhir Dhawale	Dalit Rights Activist	Accused in 2018 Bhima Koregaon violence.	2018	Granted bail on 9 January 2025.
Mahesh Raut	Tribal Rights Activist	Accused in 2018 Bhima Koregaon violence.	2018	
Shoma Sen	Rights Activist/ Professor	Accused in 2018 Bhima Koregaon violence.	2018	Granted bail on 6 April, 2024.
Surendra Gadling	Dalit and tribal rights lawyer	Accused in 2018 Bhima Koregaon violence.	2018	
Rona Wilson	Secretary - Committee for Release of Political Prisoners	Accused in 2018 Bhima Koregaon violence.	2018	Granted bail on 9 January 2025.
Sudha Bharadwaj	Trade Unionist/Civil Rights Activist	Accused in 2018 Bhima Koregaon violence.	2018	Granted bail on 9 December 2021
Varavara Rao	Activist/Poet	Accused in 2018 Bhima Koregaon violence.	2018	Granted bail on medical grounds
Vernon Gonsalves	Trade unionist, activist and academic	Accused in 2007 for Naxalite links and in 2018 Bhima Koregaon violence	2007 & 2018	Since August 2018, lodged in Taloja prison
Gautam Navlakha	Human Rights Activist/Journalist	Accused in 2018 Bhima Koregaon violence.	2018	
Asif Sultan	Journalist		2018	
Akhil Gogoi	Peasant leader/ RTI Activist	For CAA-NRC Protests	2019	Acquitted in 2021
Masrat Zahra	Journalist		2020	Charged but not arrested.
Anand Teltumbde	Civil Rights Activist/Scholar	Accused in 2018 Bhima Koregaon violence.	2020	Granted bail on 18 November 2022
Meeran Haider	Student Activists		2020	Granted bail on 5 January 2026
Safoora Zargar	Student Activists		2020	Granted bail on 23 June 2020
Sharjeel Imam	Activist	Seditious speech during anti CAA protests in Delhi	2020	
Umar Khalid	Human Rights Activist	Accused in Delhi Riots	2020	
Stan Swamy	Jesuit priest, tribals rights activist	Accused in 2018 Bhima Koregaon violence	October 2020	Died during incarceration - 2021
Ishrat Jahan	Congress Councillor, Delhi	Anti-CAA protests	February 2020	Granted bail on 14 March 2022
Siddique Kappan	Journalist	Accused for having alleged links with banned terrorist organization PFI	October 2020	Granted bail on 9 September 2022
Khurram Parvez	Human rights activist	Funding terror activities	November 2021	
Yasin Malik	Kashmiri Separatist	Chief of banned JKLF. Involvement in killing of four unarmed Indian Air Force officials in 1990 in Srinagar. Funding Islamic Terrorism in Kashmir valley.	May 2022	Life imprisonment
Irfan Mehraj	Journalist	Collaboration with Jammu Kashmir Coalition of Civil Society, under investigation by NIA.	March 2023	
Asiya Andrabi	Kashmiri Separatist	Separatist activity in Kashmir	August 2018	Life imprisonment

== See also ==
- List of organisations banned by the Government of India
- Prevention of Terrorism Act, 2002

== Bibliography ==
- The Unlawful Activities (Prevention) Act, 1967— Updated text of the Act at India Code
- "The Unlawful Activities (Prevention) Amendment Bill, 2019". PRS Legislative Research.
- "The Unlawful Activities (Prevention) Amendment Act, 2019" (PDF). egazette.nic.in. egazette.
