= Sudha Bharadwaj =

Indian activist

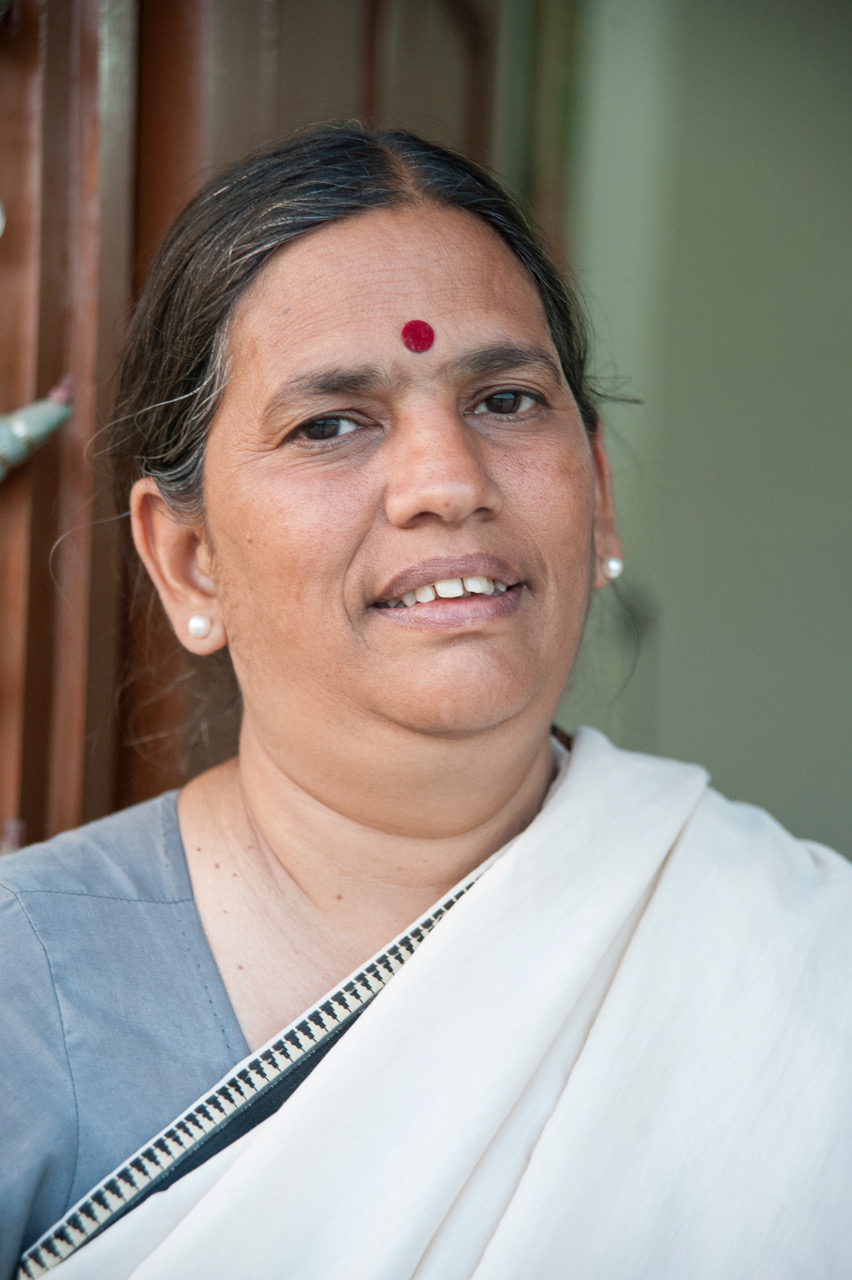
- Bharadwaj in 2020
- Born: 1 November 1961 (age 64); Massachusetts, U.S.
- Occupations: Trade unionist, activist, lawyer
- Mother: Krishna Bharadwaj

Sudha Bharadwaj (born 1 November 1961) is an Indian trade-unionist, activist and lawyer who has lived and worked in Chhattisgarh for over three decades. She is an active member of the Chhattisgarh Mukti Morcha (Mazdoor Karyakrta Committee).

She was among the activists, lawyers and academics arrested on 28 August 2018 under UAPA in the contentious Bhima Koregaon case. On 8 December 2021, she was granted bail by a special NIA Court.

== Life ==
=== Early life ===
Sudha was born in Boston and lived in the United States and United Kingdom as a child. Sudha's mother, Krishna Bharadwaj, was a well known academic and economist, who had founded the Centre for Economics Studies and Planning at Jawaharlal Nehru University. At age 11, she moved with her mother to Delhi.

She joined the integrated mathematics (five year) program of IIT Kanpur in 1979. At IIT Kanpur she joined NSS, teaching in the caste-ridden rural neighborhood. After finishing the program at IITK in 1984, she taught at DPS, for a couple of years in Delhi.

=== Arrest ===
On 28 August 2018, along with other lawyers, writers and activists, Sudha was arrested and charged with UAPA in the Bhima Koregaon case. A special NIA court granted Sudha Bharadwaj, accused in the Bhima Koregaon violence case, bail, on a surety of Rs 50,000 on 8 December 2021 after an incarceration of over three years.
