= Mukundan C. Menon =

Indian human rights activist (1948–2005)

- Born: November 21, 1948; Wadakkanchery, Thrissur district, Kerala, India
- Died: December 12, 2005 (aged 57); Thiruvananthapuram, Kerala, India
- Occupations: Journalist, human rights activist
- Years active: 1969–2005
- Known for: Co-founding PUCL and NCHRO
- Spouse: Lalitha Samuel (m. 1973; died 1986)
- Children: 3

Mukundan Chembakasseriyil Menon (21 November 1948 – 12 December 2005) was an Indian investigative journalist and human rights activist. He co-founded the People's Union for Civil Liberties and the National Confederation of Human Rights Organizations (NCHRO) in Kerala.

== Career ==
After graduating from St. Thomas College in Thrissur, Menon moved to Delhi, where he worked as a freelance journalist from 1969 to 1970. In 1972, he founded the Association for Protection of Democratic Rights (APDR).

While with APDR in Delhi, Menon campaigned for the release of prisoners associated with the Communist Party of India (Marxist-Leninist). Kista Gowda and Bhoom were ultimately hanged during The Emergency. This work led to his own incarceration during The Emergency. Following his release, he edited the journal, Third World Unity between 1978 and 1980.

As Delhi State secretary of the People's Union for Civil Liberties, Menon addressed death penalty issues. He then continued his work as a journalist in the human rights movement in Hyderabad and Thiruvananthapuram.

Menon's work included reporting on massacres in Bhagalpur in 1980 and the massacres of Sikhs in 1984. He also acted as a mediator during the Ayyankali Army's Palakkad District Collector hostage situation on 4 October 1996. Additionally, from 1981 to 1993, he worked as an investigative journalist based in Hyderabad.

In 1994, Menon became involved in the human rights movement in Kerala. He was elected Secretary of the National Confederation of Human Rights Organizations (NCHRO), an umbrella organization of human rights groups, in 1997. He worked with Human Rights Watch (USA), People's Watch Tamil Nadu, and South India Cell for Human Rights Education and Monitoring (Bangalore).

In 1999, he received a Human Rights Award from the Middle East Malayali Association.

Menon was a regular columnist for Al Jazeera, Rediff News, Indian Currents, Thejas, and The Milli Gazette. Menon later became an editorial consultant and the Resident Editor of Thejas Daily.

Menon reported on issues such as alleged human rights violations, the treatment of tribal people and Dalits, and police violence. His reporting included coverage of deaths in police custody in Alappuzha, including that of Thangal Kunju.

Menon published a critical commentary on Hindutva fascism and was described by some commentators as controversial. Some media associated with Sangh Parivar alleged that Menon was sympathetic to banned organizations. As a human rights activist, Menon condemned the role of the security forces in human rights violations and the high level of impunity that benefited those responsible for human rights violations.

Menon died on 12 December 2005 at the age of 57, following complications caused by cardiac arrest. Upon learning of Menon's death, Dr. Zafarul Islam Khan, editor of The Milli Gazette, said, "We are shocked to know of the untimely demise of our friend Mr. Mukundan C. Menon. He was a great fighter for human and civil rights in this country".

== Mukundan C. Menon Award ==
The National Confederation of Human Rights Organizations awards the Mukundan C. Menon Award annually to human rights defenders, artists, writers, and environmental activists actively involved in defending the rights of the people.

The award was instituted in honour of Menon soon after his death.

Past Winners
Sl. No.	Name	Year	Profession
1	Dr. Udayakumar	2012	Anti-Kudankulam nuclear plant activist
2	Ram Puniyani	2015	Commentator, renowned writer and rights activist
3	V. T. Rajshekar	2018	Dalit journalist and editor of Dalit Voice
4	G. N. Saibaba	2019	Delhi University Professor
5	Father Stan Swamy	2020	Priest and human rights activist

== Personal life ==
Menon married Lalitha Samuel in 1973. They had three sons together before Lalitha died in 1986, shortly after the birth of their third son.
