= Chhattisgarh Special Public Security Act, 2005 =

2005 law in Chhattisgarh, India

Chhattisgarh Special Public Security Act, 2005 (also called as Chhattisgarh Vishesh Jan Suraksha Adhiniyam, 2005) is a law in the state of Chhattisgarh passed by the Chhattisgarh assembly in December 2005. The bill received the assent of the President of India and was brought into effect by notification issued on 12 April 2006.

== The law ==
The People's Union for Democratic Rights pointed out that although this act was ostensibly meant to combat growing Maoist violence, all the Maoist groups operating in Chhattisgarh were already banned and declared unlawful organisations after the 2004 amendment to the Unlawful Activities Act, 1967.

It authorises the police to detain a person for committing acts, which among other things, show a "tendency to pose an obstacle to the administration of law". The act also states any person whose actions "encourage(s) the disobedience of the established law" will be considered "unlawful".

Commonwealth Human Rights Initiative, in a statement, said that the present definition of "unlawful activities" imperils free exercise of fundamental freedoms set out under Article 19 of the Constitution and illustratively it appears to restrict the right to hold public meetings; organise public protests; and oppose government policies through the media.

== Arrests ==
Six organisations were banned under this act. Dr. Binayak Sen, General Secretary, Chhattisgarh People's Union for Civil Liberties was detained under this Act on 14 May 2007 allegedly for his linkages with the Communist Party of India (Maoist).

== Criticism ==
The Commonwealth Human Rights Initiative has expressed its reservations about the Act and said it may become a potential instrument to throttle the right to free speech, legitimate dissent, and trample the fundamental rights enshrined in Articles 14, 19 and 21 of the Constitution.

=== Concerns on press freedom ===
President Christopher Warren, in a statement, said, "Freedom of the press is a pre-requisite for the peaceful resolution of conflict, and restricting the media from carrying out its professional activities can only lead to more suspicion and misinformation. Under no circumstances has gagging the media and silencing journalists furthered the objective of tackling armed conflict. It is only when democratic debate and the free flow of accurate information is made possible is the cause of democracy furthered."
