= List of awards and honours received by Ram Nath Kovind =

Awards and honours received by Ram Nath Kovind

The Honourable Ram Nath Kovind
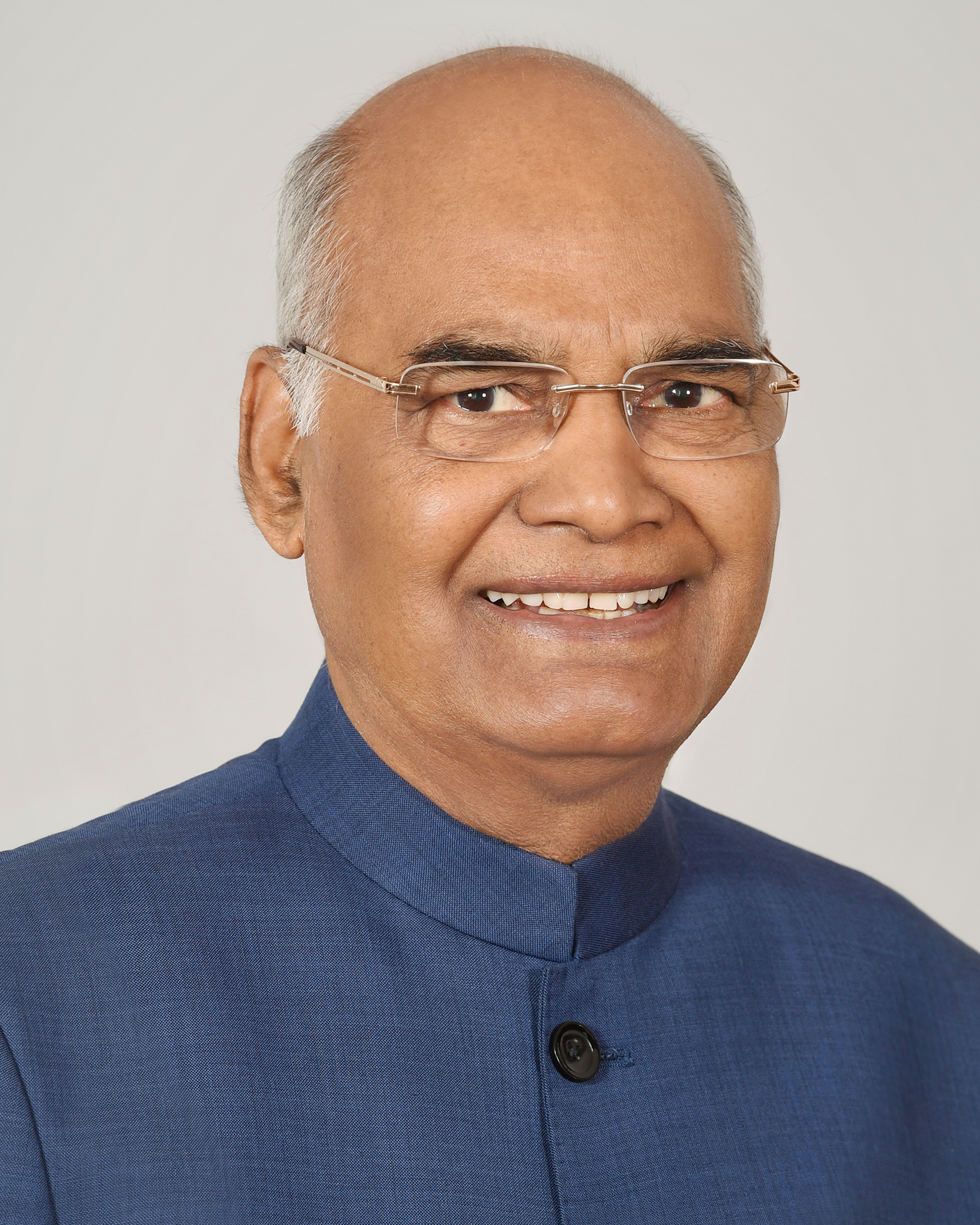
- Official portrait, 2017
- Born: Ram Nath Kovind; 1 October 1945 (age 81); Paraukh, United Provinces, British India
- Education: University of Kanpur
- Occupations: Politician; Lawyer
- Years active: 1977–present
- Organization: Rashtriya Swayamsevak Sangh
- Office: President of India
- Term: 25 July 2017 – 25 July 2022
- Predecessor: Pranab Mukherjee
- Successor: Droupadi Murmu
- Political party: Bharatiya Janata Party
- Spouse: Savita Kovind (m. 1974)

This is a list of awards, honours, and recognitions received by Ram Nath Kovind, the 14th President of India who served from 2017 to 2022. As the constitutional head of state, Kovind represented India at numerous international forums and undertook several state visits, during which he was conferred with various prestigious civilian honours, orders, and distinctions by foreign governments and institutions.

== State honours ==
Ribbon	Decoration	Country	Date	Location	Presenter	Note	Ref(s)	Image
	National Order of Madagascar	Madagascar	14 March 2018	Antananarivo	President; Hery Rajaonarimampianina	Grand Cross Second Class, the highest civilian honour of Madagascar.		
	Order of Independence	Equatorial Guinea	8 April 2018	Malabo	President; Teodoro Obiang Nguema Mbasogo	Grand Collar, the highest class of the order.		
	Order of the Lion	Eswatini	9 April 2018	Mbabane	King; Mswati III	Collar, the highest class of the order.		
	Grand Order of King Tomislav	Croatia	26 March 2019	Zagreb	President; Kolinda Grabar-Kitarović	The highest civilian honour of Croatia.		
	Order of the Condor of the Andes	Bolivia	26 March 2019	La Paz	President; Evo Morales	Grand Collar, the highest civilian honour of Bolivia.		
	National Order of Merit	Guinea	3 August 2019	Conakry	President; Alpha Condé	Grand Cross, the highest civilian honour of Guinea.		

== Scholastic ==
Kovind has a policy of not accepting honorary degrees. He had refused to accept honorary Doctor of Science from the Dr. Yashwant Singh Parmar University of Horticulture and Forestry that was offered to him in 2018.

== Key to the City ==
Year	Honour	City	Country	Presenter	Ref(s)
2019	Key to the City	Manila	Philippines	Mayor; Isko Moreno	
2019	Key to the City	Santa Cruz de la Sierra	Bolivia	Mayor; Percy Fernández	

== Addresses to foreign legislatures ==
Country	Legislature	Date	Ref(s)
Equatorial Guinea	Parliament of Equatorial Guinea	8 April 2018	
Eswatini	Parliament of Eswatini	10 April 2018	
Suriname	National Assembly of Suriname	20 June 2018	
Cyprus	House of Representatives of Cyprus	3 September 2018	
Vietnam	National Assembly of Vietnam	20 November 2018	
Benin	National Assembly of Benin	29 July 2019	
The Gambia	National Assembly of the Gambia	31 July 2019	
Bangladesh	Jatiya Sangsad	16 December 2021	
Jamaica	Parliament of Jamaica	17 May 2022	
Saint Vincent and the Grenadines	House of Assembly of Saint Vincent and the Grenadines	18 May 2022	
