= Coordination of Democratic Rights Organisations =

- Type: Non-profit

Coordination of Democratic Rights Organisations (CDRO) is a union of twenty civil liberties and democratic rights associations in India. Its member organisations meet a minimum of three to four times annually, and all of them holds equal status within the CDRO, and work in the democratic manner. It was founded in August 2007 "in the context of the violent state repression of people's movements in India as well as the arrest of democratic rights activists."

== Beliefs and objectives ==
- "The right to organize and struggle is a basic democratic right of the people."
- "To stand united against all forms of state repression on people’s democratic struggles."
- "To support with solidarity actions in the event of attacks by the state on any civil rights organisations or its representatives."

== Members ==
It has twenty members, as follows:

State	Organisation
Andhra Pradesh	Civil Liberties Committee, Andhra Pradesh Human Rights Forum, Andhra Pradesh; Organisation for Protection of Democratic Rights, Andhra Pradesh
Assam	Manab Adhikar Sangram Samiti
Delhi	People's Union for Democratic Rights, Delhi Campaign for Peace and Democracy in Manipur, Delhi
Haryana	People's Union for Civil Rights, Haryana
Jammu and Kashmir	People's Committee for Human Rights
Jharkhand	People's Union for Civil Liberties, Jharkhand
Karnataka	People's Democratic Forum
Maharashtra	Committee for Protection of Democratic Rights, Mumbai People's Union for Civil Liberties, Nagpur
Manipur	Coordination for Human Rights
Nagaland	Naga People's Movement for Human Rights
Punjab	Association for Democratic Rights
Rajasthan	People's Union for Civil Liberties, Rajasthan
Tamil Nadu	People's Union for Civil Liberties, Tamil Nadu
West Bengal	Association for Protection of Democratic Rights, West Bengal Bandi Mukti Morcha

== See also ==
- Citizen's Justice Committee
- Confederation of Human Rights Organizations
