= Ram Nath Kovind =

Former President of India

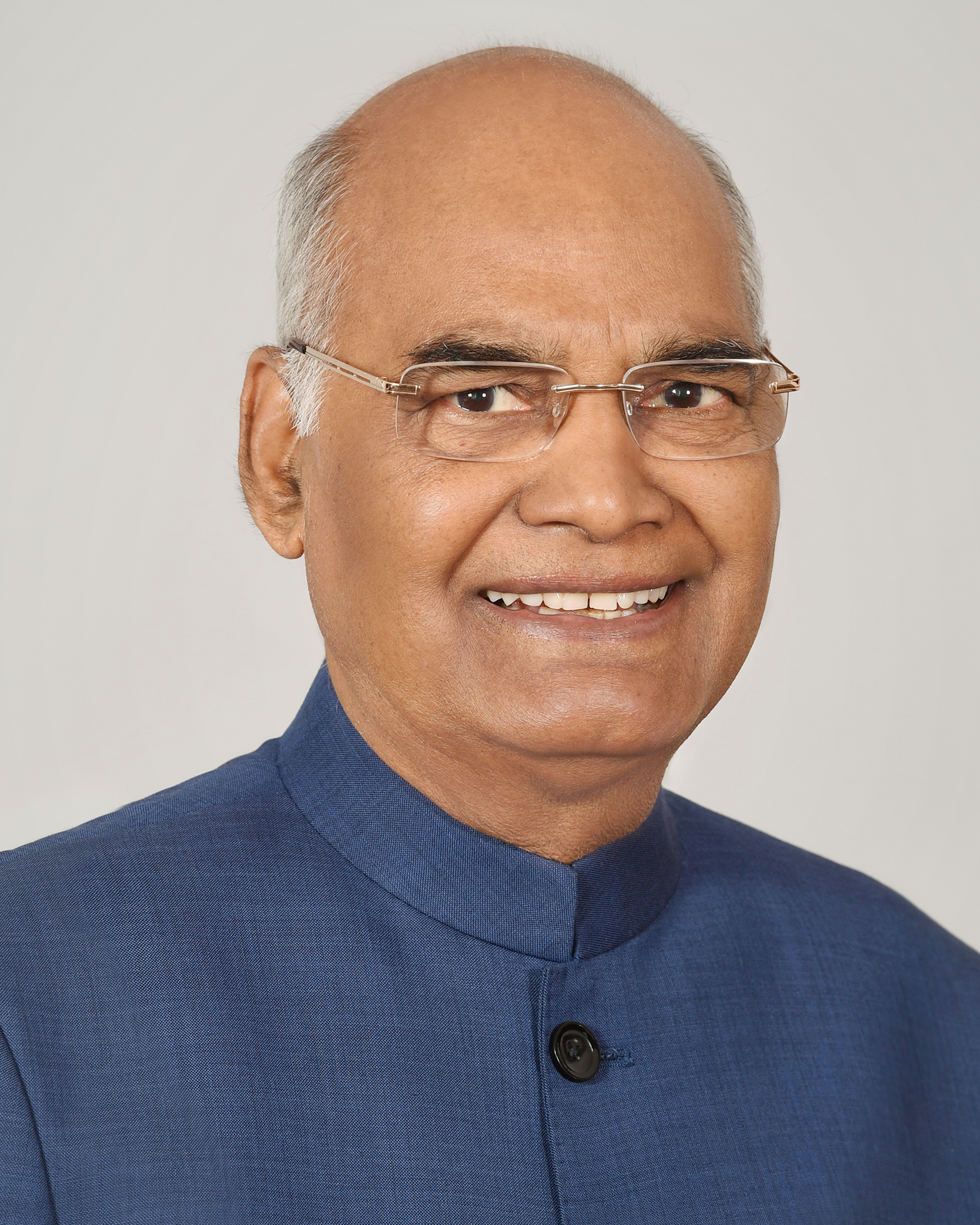
- Official portrait, c. 2017

President of India
- In office 25 July 2017 – 25 July 2022
- Prime Minister: Narendra Modi
- Vice President: Mohammad Hamid Ansari; Venkaiah Naidu
- Preceded by: Pranab Mukherjee
- Succeeded by: Droupadi Murmu

Governor of Bihar
- In office 16 August 2015 – 21 June 2017
- Chief Minister: Nitish Kumar
- Preceded by: Keshari Nath Tripathi
- Succeeded by: Keshari Nath Tripathi

Member of Parliament, Rajya Sabha
- In office 3 April 1994 – 2 April 2006
- Preceded by: Subramanian Swamy
- Succeeded by: Vinay Katiyar
- Constituency: Uttar Pradesh

Personal details
- Born: 1 October 1945 (age 81) Paraunkh, United Provinces, British India
- Party: Bharatiya Janata Party
- Spouse: Savita Kovind (m. 1974)
- Children: 2
- Education: Kanpur University (B.Com., LL.B.)
- Occupation: Politician; lawyer
- Awards: List of awards and honours
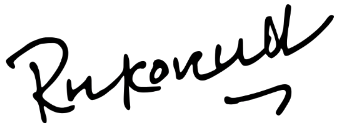
- Signature

Ram Nath Kovind (Hindi: Rām Nāth Kovind, pronounced [ɾɑm nɑt̪ʰ koʋɪnd̪] ; born 1 October 1945) is an Indian politician and lawyer who served as the president of India from 2017 to 2022. He is the first person from Uttar Pradesh as well as the first member of the Bharatiya Janata Party (BJP) to become the president of India. Prior to his presidency, he served as the Governor of Bihar from 2015 to 2017 and as a Member of Rajya Sabha from Uttar Pradesh for two successive terms. Prior to entering politics, he was a lawyer and he practised in the Delhi High Court and the Supreme Court of India until 1993.

== Early life and education ==
Kovind was born to Maiku Lal and Kalawati in a Koli family during the British Raj on 1 October 1945, in Paraunkh village in the Kanpur Dehat district of Uttar Pradesh, as the youngest of five brothers and two sisters. His father Maikulal ran a shop and was also a farmer and a local vaidya (doctor). His mother Kalawati was a homemaker. Kovind was born in a mud hut, which eventually collapsed. He was only five when his mother died of burns when their thatched dwelling caught fire. Kovind later donated the land to the community.

After his elementary school education, he needed to walk each day to Kanpur village, 8 km (5.0 mi) away, to attend junior school, as nobody in the village had a bicycle. He holds a bachelor's degree in commerce and an LLB from DAV College (affiliated with Kanpur University).

== Early career ==
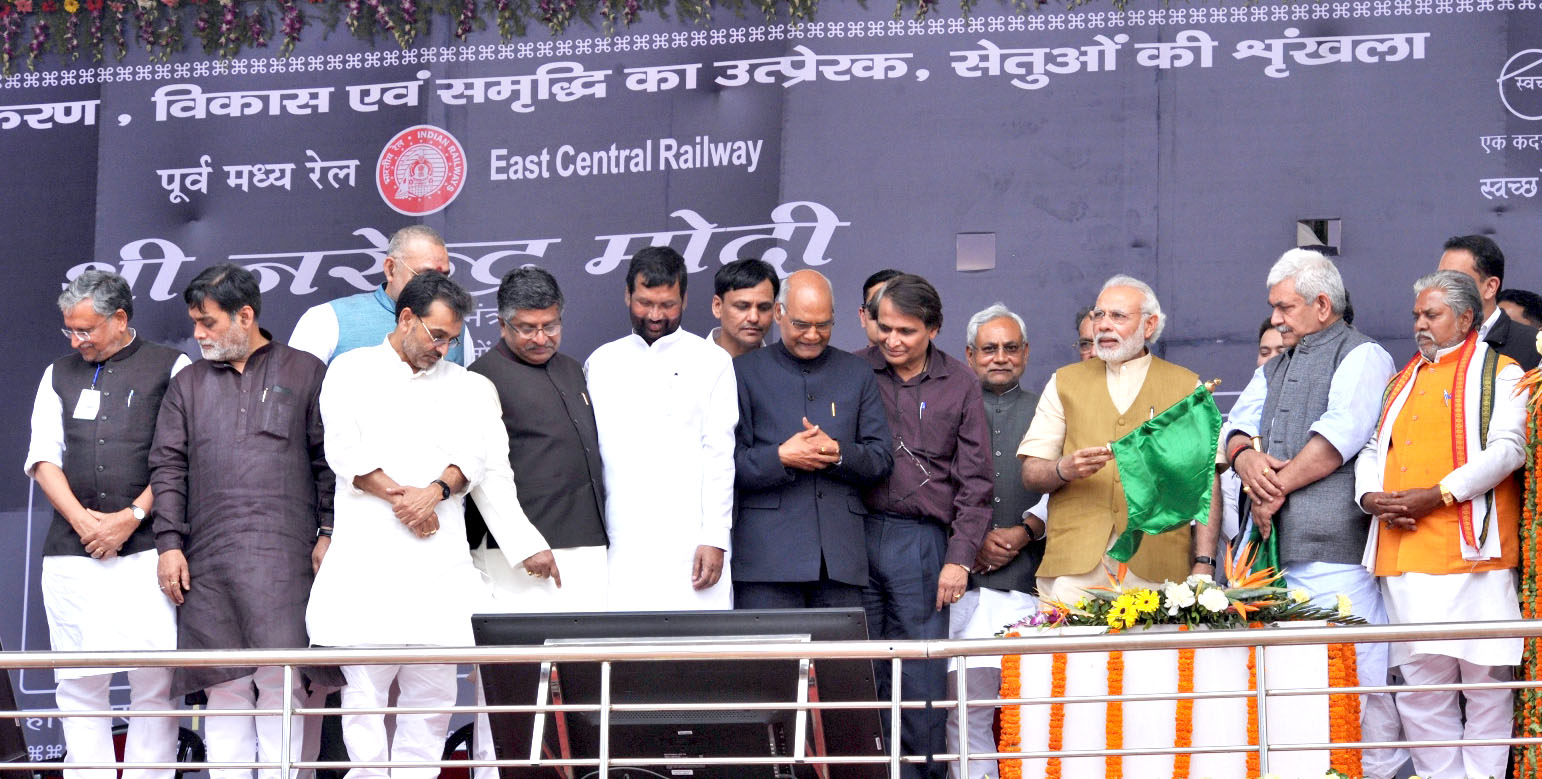
Governor Kovind at a with Prime Minister Narendra Modi and senior leaders at railway flagoff ceremony in Bihar, 2016

=== Advocate ===
After graduating in law from DAV College, Kanpur, Kovind went to Delhi to prepare for the civil services examination. He passed this exam on his third attempt, He scored high enough to work in an allied service rather than in IAS and thus started practising law.

Kovind enrolled as an advocate in 1971 with the bar council of Delhi. He was Central Government Advocate in the Delhi High Court from 1977 to 1979. Between 1977 and 1978, he also served as the personal assistant of Prime Minister of India Morarji Desai. In 1978, he became an advocate-on-record of the Supreme Court of India and served as a standing counsel for the Central Government in the Supreme Court of India from 1980 to 1993. He practised in the Delhi High Court and Supreme Court until 1993. As an advocate, he provided pro-bono aid to weaker sections of society, women and the poor under the Free Legal Aid Society of New Delhi.

=== Start of political career ===
He joined the Bharatiya Janata Party (BJP) in 1991. He was the president of the BJP Dalit Morcha between 1998 and 2002 and served as the general secretary of the All-India Koli Samaj between 1971 and 1975, and again in 1981. He also served as the national spokesperson of the party. He donated his ancestral home in Paraunkh to the Rashtriya Swayamsevak Sangh. Soon after joining the BJP, he contested Ghatampur assembly constituency, but lost and later contested Bhognipur in 2007 elections (both in Uttar Pradesh) assembly constituency on the BJP ticket but lost again.

In 1997, Kovind, joined the protest against certain orders from the central government that had adverse effects on the SC/ST workers. Later, three amendments were made to the Constitution that revoked the orders, by the NDA government headed by Atal Bihari Vajpayee.

=== Rajya Sabha ===
He was elected and became a Rajya Sabha MP from the state of Uttar Pradesh in April 1994. He served a total of twelve years, two consecutive terms, until March 2006. As a member of parliament, he served on the Parliamentary Committee for Welfare of Scheduled Castes/Tribes, Home Affairs, Petroleum and Natural Gas, Social Justice and Empowerment, Law and Justice. He also served as the chairman of the Rajya Sabha House Committee. During his career as a parliamentarian, under the Members of Parliament Local Area Development Scheme, he focused on education in rural areas by helping in the construction of school buildings in Uttar Pradesh and Uttarakhand. As a member of parliament, he visited Thailand, Nepal, Pakistan, Singapore, Germany, Switzerland, France, the United Kingdom, and the United States on study tours.

=== Other appointments ===
He has served on the Board of management of Dr. B.R Ambedkar University, Lucknow, and on the Board of Governors of IIM Calcutta. He has also represented India at the UN and addressed the United Nations General Assembly in October 2002.

== Governor of Bihar (2015–2017) ==
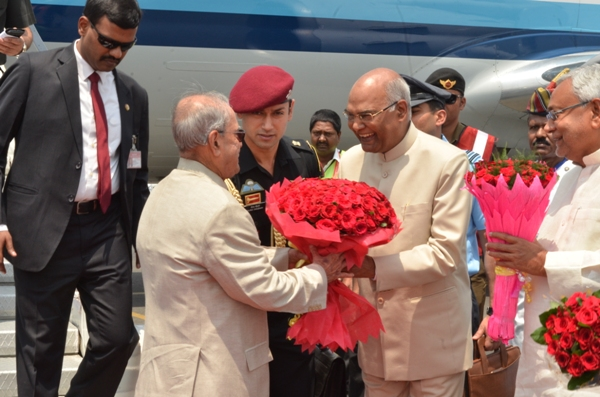
Governor Ram Nath Kovind of Bihar welcoming President Pranab Mukherjee at Patna on 17 April 2017

On 8 August 2015, President Pranab Mukherjee appointed Kovind as the governor of Bihar. On 16 August 2015, the acting Chief Justice of Patna High Court, Iqbal Ahmad Ansari, administered the oath to Kovind as the 26th governor of Bihar, in a ceremony at Raj Bhawan in Patna.

Kovind's appointment was criticised by then Chief Minister of Bihar Nitish Kumar as it came months before 2015 state Assembly elections and the appointment was made without consulting the state government as recommended by Sarkaria Commission. However, Kovind's term as the governor was praised for constituting a judicial commission to investigate irregularities in promotion of undeserving teachers, mismanagement of funds and appointment of undeserving candidates in universities. In June 2017, when he was announced as a candidate for presidential election, Nitish Kumar backed his choice and praised him as being unbiased and working closely with the state government during his governorship.

== Presidential election ==
After nomination for the post of 14th president of India, he resigned from his post as the governor of Bihar, and the President of India, Pranab Mukherjee, accepted his resignation on 20 June 2017. He won the election on 20 July 2017.

Kovind received 65.65% of the valid votes, against former Speaker of the Lok Sabha, Meira Kumar, the presidential candidate of the Opposition who received 34.35%. Kovind received 2,930 votes (From MPs and MLAs) amounting to Electoral College votes of 702,044 (65.65%) as compared to 1,844 votes with a value of 367,314 (34.35%) votes for Meira Kumar lagging far behind with 367,314 votes, and 77 votes were invalid. He is the first BJP candidate with RSS background to be elected to the post. The tally of votes (367,314) polled by Meira Kumar is only the second-highest for a losing candidate, that of Neelam Sanjiva Reddy in the 1969 presidential elections being the highest ever; he received 405,427 votes as against 420,077 by V. V. Giri, the winner.

== President of India (2017–2022) ==
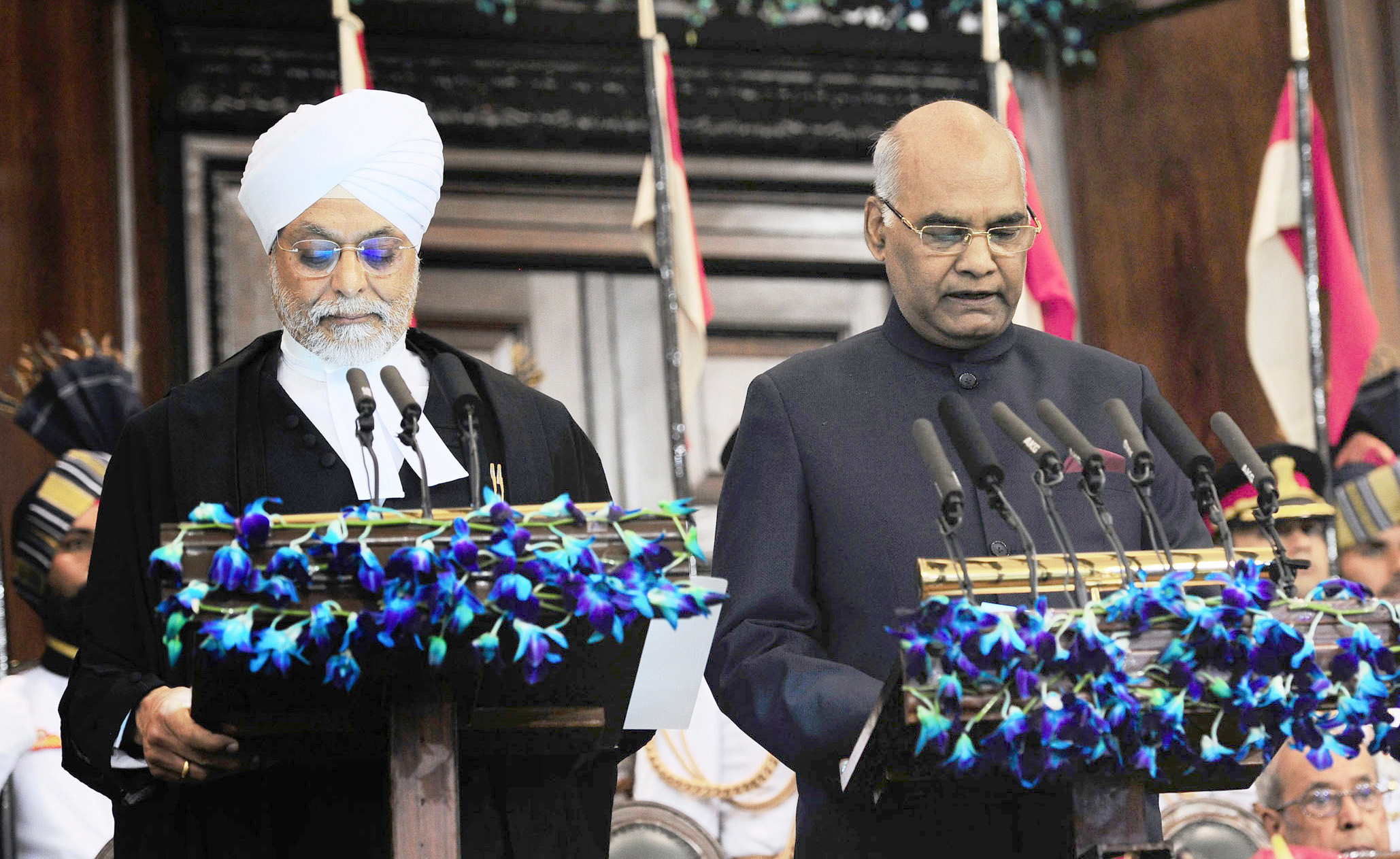
J. S. Khehar, Chief Justice of India, administering the oath of the office to President-elect Kovind, at a swearing-in ceremony in the central hall of the Samvidhan Sadan, in New Delhi in 2017

Kovind took the oath as the 14th president of India on 25 July 2017. In his 5-year term he addressed the Parliament of India five times. First address was upon taking oath, and subsequent four addresses were to joint sitting of both houses from 2018 to 2021. Kovind in his tenure administered oath of office to three Chief Justices of India and 29 other judges of Supreme Court of India. He was succeeded by Droupadi Murmu on 21 July 2022.

== Post-presidency ==
=== Kovind Committee ===
In September 2023, the Government of India formed an 8-member committee chaired by Kovind to suggest changes to the constitution for the implementation of "One Nation, One Election". The primary objective of this committee was to examine and propose specific amendments to the Representation of the People Act, 1951, and any other relevant laws and regulations to enable simultaneous elections in the country.

In March 2024, his panel submitted an extensive report (over 18,000 pages) recommending synchronised elections across all government levels– Lok Sabha, State Assemblies, and local bodies.

=== Later political life ===
On 2 October 2025, Kovind, along with RSS Sarsanghchalak Mohan Bhagwat, attended the centenary event of the Rashtriya Swayamsevak Sangh at Nagpur. He became the second president after Pranab Mukherjee to attend an event of the RSS.

Kovind unveiled his autobiography titled Triumph of the Indian Republic—My Life, My Struggles on his 80th birthday. Prime Minister Modi released Kovind's autobiography on 12 August 2026.

== Personal life ==
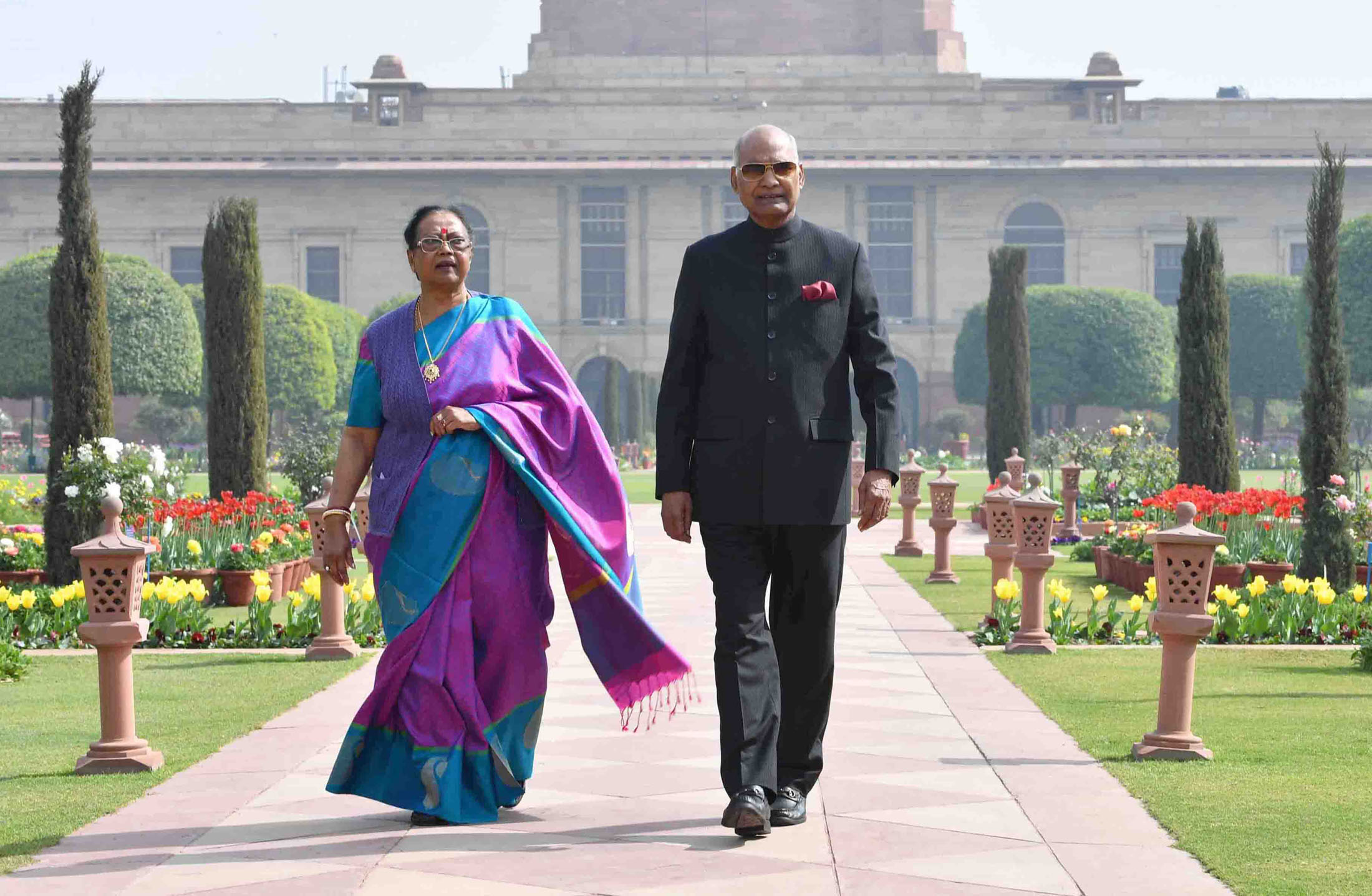
President Kovind with his wife First Lady Savita Kovind

Kovind married Savita on 30 May 1974. They have a son, Prashant Kumar, and a daughter, Swati who is an air hostess for Air India.

== Political positions ==
In 2010, he was reported to have said that "Islam and Christianity are alien to the nation" as spokesperson of the BJP. As reported by IANS and published by Hindustan Times, he made this comment in response to the Ranganath Misra Commission which recommended 15 per cent reservation for religious and linguistic minorities in government jobs. Although more recently, the issue was raised in the media if whether or not he was misquoted and that he in fact said "Islam and Christianity are alien to the notion (of caste)" as opposed to what was reported as 'nation'.

== See also ==
- Presidency of Ram Nath Kovind
- President of India

Rajya Sabha
Preceded by Subramanian Swamy	Member of Parliament for Uttar Pradesh; 1994–2006	Succeeded by Vinay Katiyar
Political offices
Preceded by Keshari Nath Tripathi	Governor of Bihar; 2015–2017	Succeeded by Keshari Nath Tripathi
Preceded by Pranab Mukherjee	President of India; 2017–2022	Succeeded by Droupadi Murmu
