= CHRO =

CHRO may refer to:

- CHRO-TV, a television station (channel 5) licensed to Pembroke, Ontario, Canada
- CHVR-FM, a radio station (96.7 FM) licensed to Pembroke, Ontario, Canada, which held the call sign CHRO from 1981 to 1990
- Chief human resources officer
- Confederation of Human Rights Organizations
