= APDR =

APDR may refer to:

- Association for Protection of Democratic Rights, India
- Asociación pola defensa da ría, Spain
