= People's Union for Democratic Rights =

- Abbreviation: PUDR
- Formation: February 1981; 45 years ago
- Type: Voluntary association
- Purpose: To legally defend civil liberties and democratic rights of the people
- Headquarters: Delhi
- Parent organisation: People's Union for Civil Liberties and Democratic Rights
- Website: www.pudr.org

People's Union for Democratic Rights is an organisation based in Delhi which is committed to legally defend "civil liberties and democratic rights" of the people. The People's Union for Democratic Rights (PUDR) is an independent entity and is not affiliated to any political party or organisation.

== Background ==
The PUDR was initially formed as the Delhi's unit of the People's Union for Civil Liberties and Democratic Rights (PUCLDR) in 1977, but the PUCLDR discontinued its activities after the Janata Party's success in the elections, while the PUDR continued to work. The national forum (PUCLDR) was later revived in 1980, but in a "new form" and with a new name, PUCL, creating a dichotomous bisection between civil liberties and democratic rights. Later in February 1981, the PUDR opted to function as a separate organisation.

=== Aims and objectives ===
- "To protect, extend and help implement the fundamental rights guaranteed by the constitution and to make people aware of the same."
- "To work towards making the Directive Principles of State Policy enforceable and justiciable."
- "To build public opinion towards the ratification and enforcement by the Indian government of the United Nations Charter of Human Rights, International Covenant on Economic, Social, and Cultural Rights, International Covenant on Civil and Political Rights, and other such covenants and charters."
- "To defend and help democratic struggles against caste, class, community, ethnicity, religion and gender based oppression."

== Organisation structure ==
The PUDR has an executive committee that is constituted of 7 members that includes two secretaries and a treasurer. The executive committee is elected every year during the Annual General Body Meeting by the Secret ballot. Every member of the PUDR is a part of its General Body. The secretaries of the PUDR in 2013 were Asish Gupta and D. Manjit. Gautam Navlakha is also veteran activist of the PUDR, and has worked as the organisation's secretary as well.

== Membership ==
The PUDR's membership is accorded only to the individuals and is not granted to organisations, based on the precondition that the member concur to the aims and objectives of the PUDR, and would "work actively and support the programme" of the PUDR. The applicants are required to get their membership application approved by the executive committee which thereafter has to be renewed annually. The membership fee per year is ₹ 10.

== Funding ==
The PUDR raises funds for itself by "income received from sale of its literature, membership fee, and donations received from members and sympathisers from time to time;" and does not obtains money from the government, institutions, or political parties. It does not take any financial aid from any source in other countries as well. The members of the PUDR work as volunteers and are not given any payment for their time.

== See also ==
- Citizen's Justice Committee
- Confederation of Human Rights Organizations
- Coordination of Democratic Rights Organisations
- Who Are The Guilty
