= Kalpana Kannabiran =

Indian sociologist and lawyer

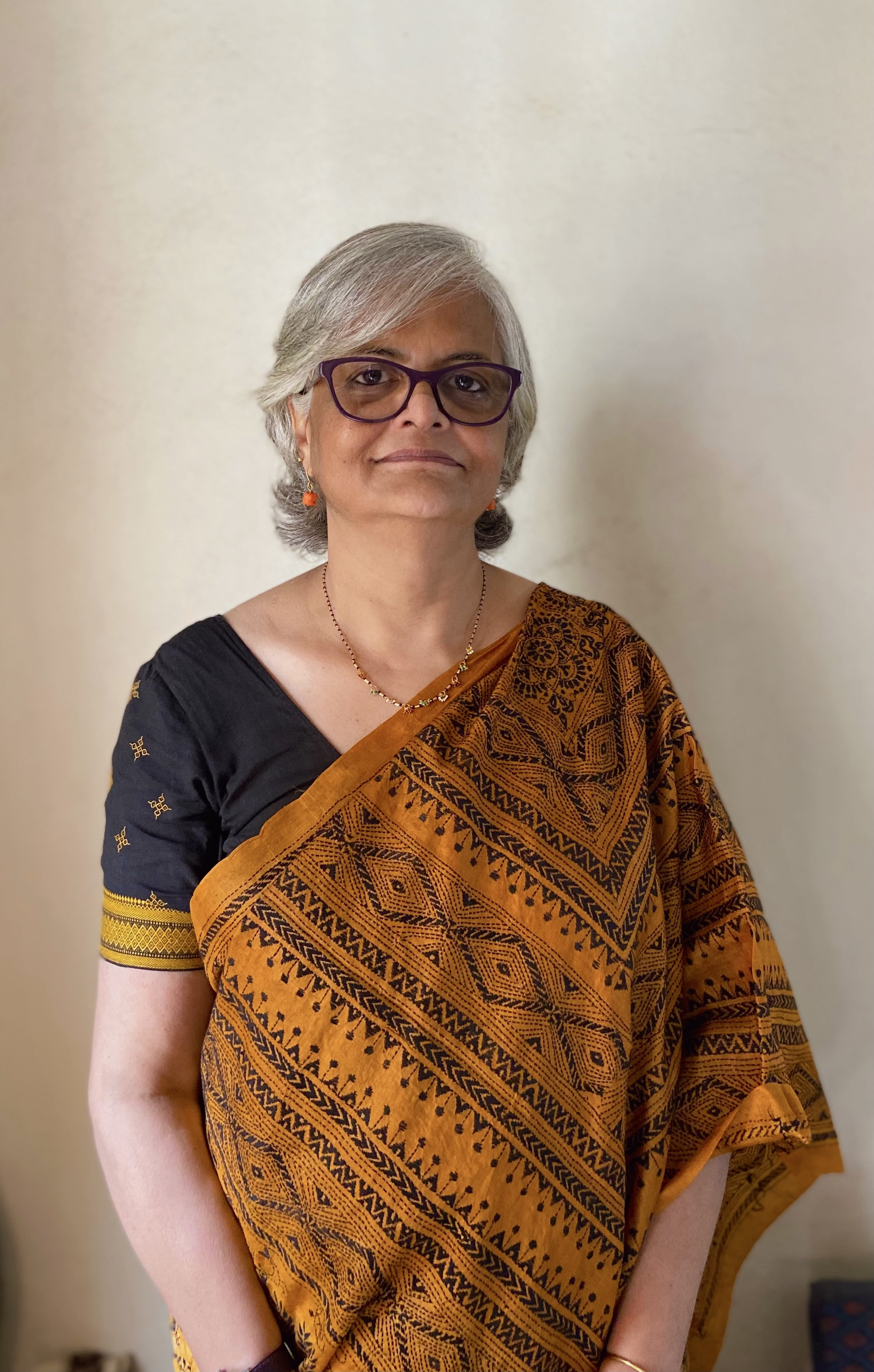
- Kannabiran in 2021
- Known for: Asmita Resource Centre for Women NALSAR University of Law Council for Social Development
- Parents: K. G. Kannabiran (father); Vasanth Kannabiran (mother)

Kalpana Kannabiran is an Indian sociologist, lawyer, human rights columnist, writer and editor based in Hyderabad, India. In March 2021, after a decade-long tenure, she retired from the post of Professor and Regional Director of the Council for Social Development, Southern Regional Centre, a research institute recognised by the Indian Council of Social Science Research. She is amongst the founding faculty of NALSAR University of Law, Hyderabad, and a co-founder of the women's rights group Asmita Resource Centre for Women, established in 1991 in Hyderabad. She was nominated as the Civil Society Advisory Governor for Asia by the Commonwealth Foundation, London in January 2020 for a term of three years. At present, Kannabiran is a Distinguished Professor at the Council for Social Development.

She has edited and authored twenty-six books and close to a hundred essays, apart from making regular contributions to the national press, online magazines and blogs.

Kannabiran's work has focused on sociology of law, historical sociology, social movements, disability rights, violence and gender studies, caste, indigenous/Adivasi rights, jurisprudence, equality and anti-discrimination law.

== Early life and education ==
Kalpana Kannabiran completed her M.A. and M.Phil. in Sociology from University of Hyderabad in 1983 and 1985 respectively. She obtained a Diploma and Advanced Diploma in Russian with distinction from the Central Institute of English and Foreign Languages, Hyderabad (now English and Foreign Languages University) in 1981 and 1982 respectively.

In 1993, she earned a PhD in sociology from Jawaharlal Nehru University. She also holds an LLM in Jurisprudence from the Post Graduate College of Law, Osmania University.

== Career ==
After obtaining her doctorate degree in sociology from the Jawaharlal Nehru University, from 1994 to 1999, Kalpana Kannabiran served as the Director of Research and Legal Outreach at the Asmita Resource Centre for Women in Secunderabad where she provided pro-bono legal counselling to women victims of domestic violence and women in difficult situations. Even after leaving her full-time position in 1999, Kannabiran continued to be actively involved with Asmita, designing the organisation's legal aid, strategic litigation, training and capacity building programmes.

In July 1999, she joined the NALSAR University of Law at Hyderabad as a founding faculty member. As a professor of sociology, Kannabiran taught undergraduate and postgraduate courses in sociology, labour law and criminal law; and was a part of the team that introduced and taught the Masters Programme (LLM) in Human Rights.

From March 2011 until March 2021, Kannabiran served as a Professor and Regional Director at the Council for Social Development, Southern Regional Centre ('CSD'). In 2012, she founded the PhD programme in social sciences and women's studies in collaboration with the Tata Institute of Social Sciences, Hyderabad and Mumbai.

In the year 2007–08, she was invited as a member of the Expert Group on the Equal Opportunity Commission (EOC) constituted by the Ministry of Minority Affairs of the Government of India in order to prepare a structure for the working of proposed EOC in India.

In 2007 and 2014, when India had to submit its national compliance reports to United Nations Committee on the Elimination of Discrimination Against Women, and, Kannabiran as a part of the National Alliance of Women, edited the two consecutive NGO Alternative Reports – in 2007 and 2014 submitted to the Committee at this time. The recommendations made in these two reports were crucial in informing the stance taken by the Committee in its Concluding Comments.

Kalpana Kannabiran submitted recommendations to the Parliamentary Standing Committee (PSC) on the Persons with Disabilities Bill before the PSC session chaired by Member of Parliament Ramesh Bais during its review conducted on 3 December 2014. She also presented her analysis of the law on sexual assaults before the Justice Verma Committee, whose recommendations ultimately led to the enactment of the Criminal Law (Amendment) Act, 2013. In 2004, she made recommendations to the PSC led by Member of Parliament Arjun Singh on the enactment of the Protection of Women Against Domestic Violence Act. Kalpana is a life member of Indian Association for Women's Studies and has been elected to the position of Joint Secretary (1996–1998) and General Secretary (1998–2000). She has been active in the International Sociological Association, and was the Chair of Research Committee 32: Women in Society (2002–2006) and a member of the executive committee from 2014 to 2018.

== Works ==
- De-Eroticizing Assault: Essays on Modesty, Honour and Power (Stree 2002, with Vasanth Kannabiran)
- Violence of Normal Times: Essays on Women’s Lived Realities (Women Unlimited 2005)
- Tools of Justice: Non-Discrimination and the Indian Constitution (Routledge 2012)
- Women and Law: Critical Feminist Perspectives (Sage 2014)
- Violence Studies (Oxford University Press 2016)
- Re-Presenting Feminist Methodologies: Interdisciplinary Explorations (Routledge 2017, Co-editor: Padmini Swaminathan)
- Gender Regimes and the Politics of Privacy: A Feminist Re-Reading of Puttaswamy vs. Union of India (Zubaan, 2021, with Swethaa S. Ballakrishnen)
- Law, Justice and Human Rights in India: Short Reflections (Orient BlackSwan, 2021)
- Routledge Readings on Law, Development and Legal Pluralism - Ecology, Families, Governance (Routledge 2022)
- Routledge Readings on Law and Social Justice - Dispossessions, Marginalities, Rights (Routledge 2022)

== Awards and achievements ==
- Rockefeller Humanist-in-Residence Fellowship, Women's Studies Program, Hunter College, City University of New York in the year 1992–93.
- V.K.R.V. Rao Prize in Social Sciences awarded by the Institute for Social and Economic Change and the Indian Council of Social Science Research for the year 2003, for the subject area Social Aspects of Law.
- Amartya Sen Award for Distinguished Social Scientists for the discipline of Law in 2012.
- Presented the 2022 Impact Award by the International Network of Genocide Scholars [INoGS].
