= Binayak Sen =

Indian pediatrician and public health specialist

Binayak Sen বিনায়ক সেন
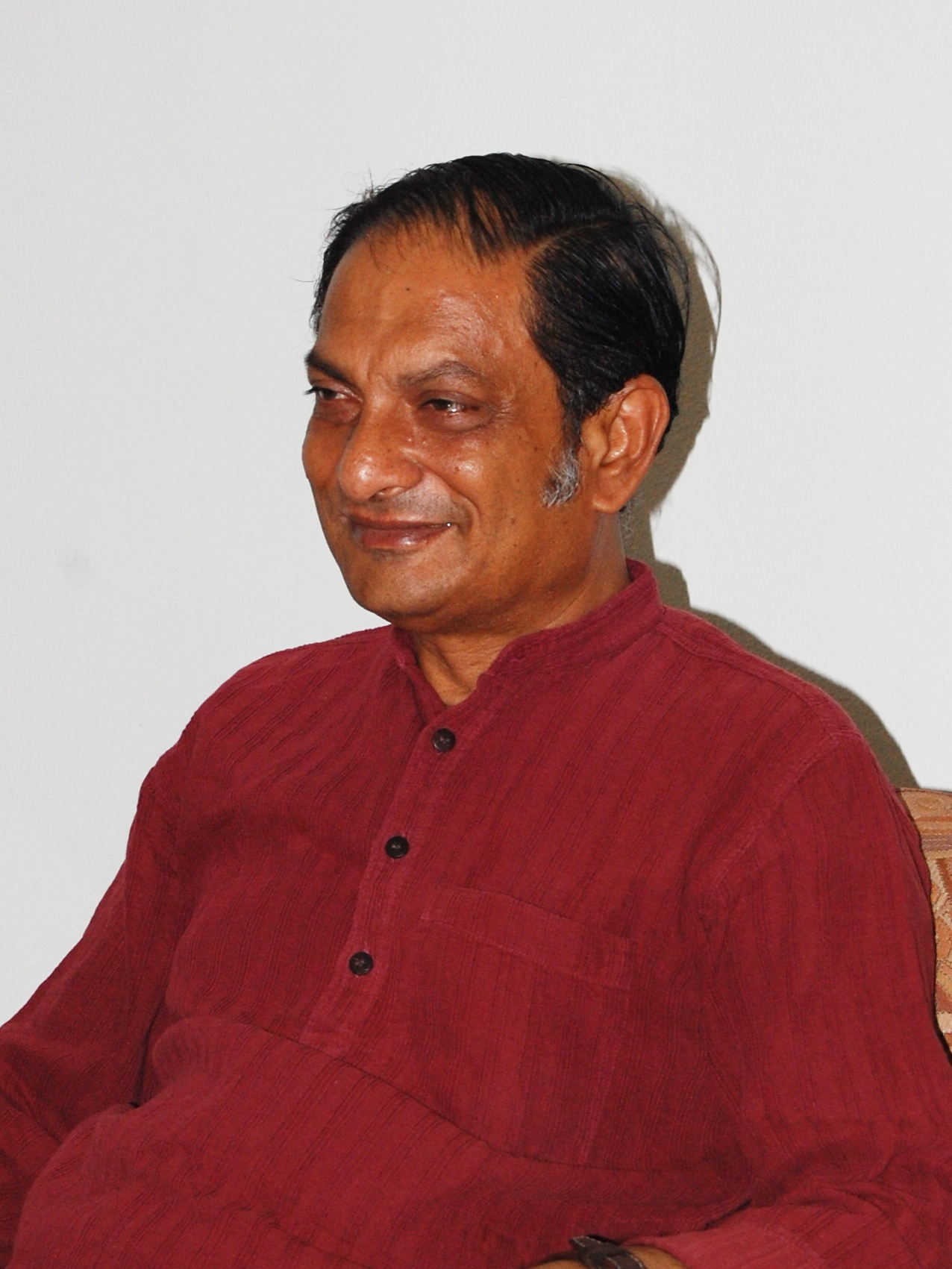
- Sen in Wardha, 2011
- Born: 4 January 1950 (age 76)
- Education: MBBS and MD (Paediatrics)
- Alma mater: Calcutta Boys' School, Kolkata. Christian Medical College, Vellore.
- Occupations: Physician, activist
- Organization(s): People's Union for Civil Liberties (PUCL); Taught at JNU Delhi for 2 years
- Known for: Human rights activism
- Criminal charges: Sedition, Criminal Conspiracy
- Criminal penalty: Life imprisonment
- Criminal status: Trial court, released on Bail pending Appeal.
- Spouse: Ilina Sen
- Awards: Jonathan Mann Award for Global Health and Human Rights (2008)

Binayak Sen (Hindi: बिनायक सेन, Bengali: বিনায়ক সেন) is a paediatrician, and public health specialist. He is the national Vice-President of the People's Union for Civil Liberties (PUCL). He is the recipient of several awards including the Jonathan Mann Award, the Gwangju Prize for Human Rights, and the Gandhi International Peace Award.

Binayak Sen originally started working as a paediatrician extending health care to poor people in the rural-tribal areas of the Chhattisgarh state, doubling up as a human rights activist. While Sen has worked with the state government on health sector reform he has also strongly criticised the government on human rights violations during the anti-Naxalite operations, while advocating non-violent political engagement.

In May 2007, he was detained for allegedly supporting the outlawed Naxalites which would violate the provisions of the Chhattisgarh Special Public Security Act 2005 (CSPSA) and the Unlawful Activities (Prevention) Act 1967. Sen first applied for bail before the Raipur Sessions Court and then the Chhattisgarh High Court in July 2007, soon after his arrest. Sen spent over two years in jail on charges of acting as a courier between Naxal leader Sanyal and businessman Piyush Guha. He was also accused of having associations with the CPI (Maoist), a group linked to the Naxal movement. but was granted bail by the Supreme Court of India on 25 May 2009.

In 2010, he was convicted and sentenced to life imprisonment by Raipur Sessions Court, Chhattisgarh, for sedition and helping Naxalites to set up a network to fight the State. He was granted bail on 15 April 2011 by the Supreme Court of India which gave no reason for the order. Sen has filed an appeal before the Chhattisgarh High Court and the case is pending.

== Career as a doctor ==
Binayak Sen and his wife Ilina Sen played key roles in the foundation of the Chhattisgarh Mukti Morcha's Shaheed Hospital which is owned and operated by a workers' organisation. He is also an advisor to Jan Swasthya Sahyog, a health care organisation. He has also been published in the prestigious British medical journal The Lancet (in its edition of 12 February 2011) where he talks about the severe inaccessibility of the healthcare to the poor in India. The article was hailed as reaffirmation of support to Dr Sen by the international community by Ilina Sen.

== PUCL activist ==
Sen is the National Vice-President of the People's Union for Civil Liberties (PUCL) and General Secretary of its Chhattisgarh unit. In this capacity, he helped organise numerous investigations into alleged human rights violations carried out during anti-Naxalite operations. The alleged violations included the murder of unarmed and innocent civilians by the anti-Naxalite movement Salwa Judum.

In a 2008 interview, Sen stated that he does not condone the Naxalites, does not approve of their violent methods, and has spoken strongly against them several times. But, he also expressed his opposition to the violent activities carried out by Salwa Judum, which he believes, have created a split in the tribal community. Sen advocates peaceful methods such as negotiations to solve the Naxalite problem.

== Awards and honours ==
Sen was the recipient in 2004 of the Paul Harrison award for a lifetime of service to the rural poor. This award is given annually by the Christian Medical College in Vellore, India to its alumni.

Sen was awarded the R. R. Keithan Gold Medal by The Indian Academy of Social Sciences (ISSA) on 31 December 2007. The citation describes him as "one of the most eminent scientists" of India. "The award is for his outstanding contribution to the advancement of science of Nature-Man-Society and his honest and sincere application for the improvement of quality of life of the poor, the downtrodden and the oppressed people of Chhattisgarh." His "suffering and personal risk" would inspire scientists as well as the general public for a very long time, according to the citation.

Sen was selected for the Jonathan Mann Award for Global Health and Human Rights in 2008. The Global Health Council issued a public statement, "Dr. Sen's accomplishments speak volumes about what can be achieved in very poor areas when health practitioners are also committed community leaders. He staffed a hospital created by and funded by impoverished mine workers, and he has spent his lifetime educating people about health practices and civil liberties—providing information that has saved lives and improved conditions for thousands of people. His good works need to be recognized as a major contribution to India and to global health; they are certainly not a threat to state security."

Sen has been awarded the Gwangju Prize for Human Rights 2011 in memory of the Gwangju Democratization Movement of South Korea. The award announcement remarks "Dr Sen, as an accomplished medical practitioner has distinguished himself by his devotion to providing health services for the poor and by his strong advocacy against human rights violations and structural violence inflicted on the poor in Chhattisgarh, a state in central India."

== Allegations of Naxalite links ==
=== Arrest in 2007 ===
On 14 May 2007, Sen was arrested in Bilaspur on the charges of acting as a courier between jailed Naxalite leader Narayan Sanyal and businessman Piyush Guha, also accused of having links with Naxalites. Sen had met the 70-year-old Sanyal 33 times in Raipur jail, though all the visits were with prior police permission. The Chhattisgarh police also reportedly relied on certain electronic documents to establish a link between Sen and Naxalites.

The evidence presented against Sen included:

- A post card dated 3 June 2006, written by Narayan Sanyal to Binayak Sen from Raipur Central Jail, regarding his health and legal case, duly signed by the Jail authorities
- A yellow coloured book "On The Unity Between CPI (Peoples' War) and Maoist Communist Centre".
- A letter written by Madanlal Banjare of CPI (Maoist) to Binayak Sen.
- An article titled "Krantikari Janwadi Morcha (ITF) (Revolutionary People's Front) Vaishvikaran evam Bharatiya Seva Kshetra; (Globalization and the Service Sector in India)
- Two articles titled "Naxal Movement, Tribals and Women's Movement" and "How to build an Anti-US Imperialist Front."

The Central Forensic Science Laboratory (CFSL), Hyderabad analysed the contents of Sen's computer during 6–11 June 2007, under the orders of the Session's Court.

On 15 May 2007, Sen was presented before a local court where he was denied the bail and was remanded to judicial custody. On 18 May, he was produced in the Sessions Court, Raipur. The Court ordered a search of Sen's house at Katora Talab in Raipur in presence of independent witnesses and his wife, Ilina Sen. The search was conducted lawfully the next day. His bail plea was again rejected on 25 May, as the Chhattisgarh Police claimed that he was a threat to the security of the State.

=== Protests ===
Various delegations of physicians and human rights activists meet chief secretary and law secretary to appeal for Sen's release. The people who were against the bail to Binayak Sen claimed that the protestors were not well versed with the workings of Binayak Sen or the Naxalite-Maoist insurgency.

On 7 June 2007, Sen's wife Ilina Sen wrote a letter to the National Human Rights Commission, stating that the couple's work "has always been in the public sphere and completely overboard [above board] for the last 20 years and more." It protests "the malafide intent of the state of Chhattisgarh in first identifying its victims, and then seeking to build up concocted cases against them." The submission apprehends a campaign of "media vilification" against Ilina Sen.

Amnesty International, which saw the arrest as harassment of a human rights activist, declared his detention in breach of international law. It issued a call to the Government of Chhattisgarh to immediately release Sen, unless he could be charged with a cognisable offence.

On 7 June 2007, the British House of Commons published an Early day motion entitled "Arrest of Dr. Binayak Sen" supported by several members of parliament across party lines, including Diane Abbott (Labour), Peter Bottomley (Conservative), John Hemming (Liberal Democrat), Dai Davies (Independent, Wales), Mike Weir (Scottish NP), among others.

On 9 June 2007, the British Medical Journal published an article about Sen's arrest. It states that Ramesh Gopalakrishnan, of Amnesty International, offered the following comment to BMJ about the supposed charges: "These offences allow sweeping interpretations of criminal intent. Activists in India are arrested all the time on such charges, which give wide, arbitrary powers to police." The same BMJ article reports a protest, outside the Indian High Commission in London, whose organiser is quoted as saying, "Dr Sen is a champion of peace and fair play and an internationally respected medical doctor who has devoted his whole life to peaceful service of the poorest people. He should be released immediately."

Noam Chomsky and several other prominent figures issued a press statement dated 16 June 2007 alleging that "Dr Sen's arrest is clearly an attempt to intimidate PUCL and other democratic voices that have been speaking out against human rights violations in the state."

On 20 June 2007 a delegation from the PUCL met the Chief Minister (CM) of Chhattisgarh state, and objected to Sen being accused of supporting the Naxalites. The delegation insisted that Sen's visits to the jailed Naxalite Narayan Sanyal were for the latter's "medical treatment" and also regarding his legal case. They pointed out that these visits took place in the Raipur jail, following procedures laid down in the jail manual." The PUCL delegation also raised objections about the analysis of Sen's computer in the absence of Sen's advocate and the independent court-appointed witness which they said could have offered the chance to tamper with evidence. The court had ordered on 22 May 2007 that both these observers should be present during the examination of Sen's computer. Nobel laurate economist and thinker Amartya Sen also criticised the December 2010 verdict for Sen's imprisonment. He stated that instead of getting his due honour for his service, Sen had met with an unfortunate verdict.

=== Rejection of Bail ===
==== High Court ====
In July 2007, Sen's bail was rejected by the Chhattisgarh High Court after Police claimed that they had got incriminating evidences against Binayk Sen from his hard disc belonging to him.

=== Supreme Court ===
In August 2007, a bench of Justices Ashok Bhan and V. S. Sirpurkar at the Supreme Court of India sought a response from the Chhattisgarh government after senior counsel Soli Sorabjee claimed that Sen was illegally detained since 14 May on fabricated charges of supporting Naxalites. The report stated that the Director General of Police in Chhattisgarh had conceded Sen's peaceful approach however the DGP rejected the suggestion that Sen had been arrested for criticising crimes such as extra-judicial killings in staged "fake encounters". The DGP has stated his belief that "Dalits movements, women empowerment movements, human rights movements, environment protection movements" are all suspect because Naxalites want to penetrate and hijack "movements not linked with CPI."

In December 2007, Supreme Court dismissed Sen's bail petition. The bench comprising Justices Ashok Bhan and D K Jain refused to accept Sen's plea stating that he was only an activist of People's Union for Civil Liberties (PUCL) and was in no way connected with the banned outfit CPI(ML). Bench while rejecting his arguments observed: "You are emphasising too much on PUCL. This does not mean that you are immune. This also does not mean your are not associated with banned activities."'

=== Confinement ===
Sen was kept in solitary confinement during the period from 15 March to 11 April 2008. The prison authorities stated that this was for his security. Sen's wife Ilina stated that he has been isolated from the world during his year of imprisonment, with access to only pro-government newspaper.

On 29 April 2008, Human Rights Watch in New York issued a public statement regarding the trial of Sen due to begin in Raipur on 30 April 2008: "the district court's limit of one supporter of the defendant at the trial is unnecessarily restrictive and raises broader concerns about the fairness of the trial."

The Global Health Council, Harvard School of Public Health, Harvard Medical School and several other prominent global health organisations issued a joint statement of support for Sen, requesting that Indian authorities allow the doctor to receive the Jonathan Mann Award for Health and Human Rights in person in Washington, D.C., on 29 May 2008, at the 35th Annual International Conference on Global Health. The declaration stated: "We would also like to convey our concern and dismay that Dr. Sen remains imprisoned, after nearly one year without trial, on allegations that he passed notes from a rebel leader whom he treated in jail to a person outside the prison. Dr. Sen has denied all wrongdoing and nothing in his character or history, as a dedicated community leader who has urged a peaceful settlement to this conflict for years, would support the accusations made against him. These allegations have not been substantiated or proven and have prevented Dr. Sen from providing his much-needed health services to the poor in his area, as well as his community leadership activities as an officer of the People's Union for Civil Liberties."

Twenty-two Nobel laureates from around the world wrote to India's President and Prime Minister and Chhattisgarh state authorities. They said Sen should be allowed to travel to the US to receive the Jonathan Mann Award for Global Health and Human Rights. "We also wish to express grave concern that Dr Sen appears to be incarcerated solely for peacefully exercising his fundamental human rights," the letter said. This is "in contravention of Articles 19 (freedom of opinion and expression) and 22 (freedom of association) of the International Covenant on Civil and Political Rights – to which India is a state party – and that he is charged under two internal security laws that do not comport with international human rights standards," it added.

Doctors across India started holding free clinics for the poor in tribute to the example of Sen and to peacefully campaign for his release.

The Government of India led by the Indian National Congress which is the opposition party in the state of Chhattisgarh reacted strongly to international appeals for the release of Dr Binayak Sen. The Government feels that the issue around Dr Binayak Sen is a well orchestrated campaign and just because he is selected for a western award, does not make him less guilty in their view. The Ministry of Home Affairs (MHA) said that the State Government is right in opposing Dr Sen's appeal.

=== Trial ===
On 3 August 2007, Chhattisgarh Police filed charge-sheets under the Chhattisgarh Special Public Security Act 2005 (CSPSA) and the Unlawful Activities (Prevention) Act 1967 in the court of Additional Chief Judicial Magistrate Satyabhama Dubey against Sen. The trial against Binayak Sen began in the trial court in Raipur on 30 May 2008. On 4 May 2008, Supreme Court issued notice to Chhattisgarh government on Sen's bail plea. It asked the state government to provide "best medical aid" to Sen, who is suffering from a heart ailment.

On 11 August 2008, a second bail petition was filed in the Chhattisgarh High Court in Bilaspur. On 21 October, Sen made a public appeal and proposal for peace in South Bastar.

=== Grant of bail by the Supreme Court ===
Sen was granted bail on 25 May 2009 by a vacation bench of the Supreme Court comprising Justice Markandey Katju and Justice Deepak Verma as his health conditions were deteriorating.

=== Conviction, sentencing and bail ===
On 24 December 2010, the Additional Sessions and District Court Judge B.P Varma Raipur found Binayak Sen, Naxal ideologue Narayan Sanyal and Kolkata businessman Piyush Guha, guilty of sedition for helping the Maoists in their fight against the state. They were sentenced to life imprisonment. Immediately after the sentencing, Dr. Sen's bail was revoked and he was taken back into custody.

Binayak Sen was held guilty under Chhattisgarh Special Public Security Act 2005, Unlawful Activities (Prevention) Act 1967, of being a conduit between Naxals and of meeting Narayan Sanyal in jail. The trio has also been convicted under provisions of section 124A of Indian Penal Code (IPC) (sedition) and 120-B Indian Penal Code (conspiracy).

Binayak Sen's sentence has been condemned both in India and internationally. Nobel Laureate Amartya Sen has condemned the judgement as "unjust".

Against this judgement, Binayak again applied for bail on 6 January 2011. An eight-member delegation of the European Union were present at the court during the entire hearing. On 25 January 2011, the Chhattisgarh High Court heard his bail plea for the second consecutive day and then fixed 9 February for the next hearing. The court denied bail to him during the subsequent hearing.

Dr. Sen had moved the apex court challenging the order of the Chhattisgarh High Court which had rejected his bail plea on 10 February 2011. Dr. Sen has sought bail contending that the trial court has erred in convicting him as there was no substantial evidence against him. Human rights and social activists have described Dr. Sen's conviction and sentence as "politically motivated."

The Supreme Court on 11 March 2011 issued notice to the Chhattisgarh government on a petition by rights activist Binayak Sen seeking bail and stay on his life imprisonment imposed by a sessions court for his links with Maoists. A bench of Justices' H.S. Bedi and C.K. Prasad asked the Chhattisgarh government to file its response within four weeks. The bench passed the order despite counsel for Dr. Sen seeking adjournment of the matter. On 15 April 2011, the Supreme Court of India has granted bail to Dr. Binayak Sen, after questioning the sedition charge against him and adding that "the question of passing letters or documents does not arise." However the apex court said it was giving no reason for granting bail to 61-year-old Sen and left it to the satisfaction of the trial court concerned to impose the conditions for his release on bail.

Media reports said that no evidence of sedition had been produced against the accused by the Chhattisgarh Government. According to The Hindu, one of the two judges told the senior state counsel ""We are a democratic country. He may be a sympathiser. That does not make him guilty of sedition." Drawing an analogy, he asked Mr. Lalit: “if Mahatma Gandhi's autobiography is found in somebody's place, is he a Gandhian? No case of sedition is made out on the basis of materials in possession unless you show that he was actively helping or harbouring them [Maoists].""

The case has generated interests of Indian and foreign NGOs and governments.

== See also ==
- Kartam Joga
- People's Union for Civil Liberties (PUCL)
- Sudhir Dhawale

== Publications ==
- Minnie Vaid (2011) A Doctor to Defend: The Binayak Sen Story. Publisher: Rajpal PP: 243, ISBN 9788170289272
- Ilina Sen, Inside Chhattisgarh: A Political Memoir. Penguin Books India, 2014. ISBN 978-0-143-41404-9. (Ilina Sen is the spouse of Binayak Sen)
