= V. M. Tarkunde =

Indian lawyer, activist and humanist (1909–2004)

Judge of the Bombay High Court
- In office 1957–1969

Personal details
- Born: 3 July 1909 Saswad, Pune, Maharashtra, British India
- Died: 22 March 2004 (aged 94) Delhi, India
- Education: Fergusson College; Lincoln's Inn; London School of Economics
- Occupation: Lawyer; civil rights activist; judge; humanist
- Known for: Civil Liberties Movement in India
- Awards: Padma Bhushan (1998); International Humanist Award (1978)

Vithal Mahadeo Tarkunde (3 July 1909 – 22 March 2004) was a prominent Indian lawyer, civil rights activist, and humanist leader and has been referred to as the "Father of the Civil Liberties movement" in India and a former judge of the Bombay High Court The Supreme Court of India also praised him as "undoubtedly the most distinguished judge of the post-Chagla 1957 period" in the Bombay High Court.

== Early life and education ==
Vithal Mahadeo Tarkunde was born in Saswad, Pune District, Maharashtra on 3 July 1909. He was the 2nd of the five children of Mahadeo Rajaram Tarkunde, a popular lawyer and social reformer at Saswad, then headquarters of Purandar taluka adjoining Pune. His father, a Brahmin by caste, had fought against the practice of untouchability.

In 1920 he migrated from Saswad to Pune and joined the New English School, Pune. In the Matriculation examination of 1925 held by the Bombay University, he stood first in the erstwhile Bombay Presidency. He also secured the prestigious Jagannath Shankersheth Scholarship for Sanskrit. He then joined the Fergusson College for BA which he completed in 1929, subsequently moving to London, where he attended the Lincoln's Inn and qualified as a Barrister-at-Law in 1931. He also attended lectures in economics, political science and social anthropology at the London School of Economics(LSE) as an external student. He returned to India the next year in December and commenced his legal practice in Pune.

== Legal career ==
Tarkunde started practice at Pune soon after he returned to India in 1933. He continued there till 1942 when he gave up his practice to become a full-time member of the Radical Democratic Party. He resumed his legal practice in the Bombay High Court in 1948 after Independence and was elevated to the bench as a Judge of the Bombay High Court in September 1957. He stepped down voluntarily as Judge of the Bombay High Court in 1969 and set up practice in the Supreme Court of India where he continued till his resignation in 1977 at the age of 68. He was chiefly concerned with Public Interest Litigations and constitutional cases, most of which he conducted with little or no fees.

== Activism ==
In 1933, he joined the Congress Socialist Party(CSP) and the Indian National Congress but later left the CSP disillusioned with their vote against Subhas Chandra Bose in the January 1939 Tripuri session of Congress. He then joined the League of Radical Congressmen led by his mentor M. N. Roy in April 1939.

In 1940, Roy and Tarkunde, along with several others, left the Congress after dissenting on the question of participation in the Second World War. Roy advocated participation in the war against the Axis powers, while simultaneously striving for Indian independence, and founded the Radical Democratic Party to further this cause. In 1942, Tarkunde gave up his legal practice to become a full-time member of the Radical Democratic Party and was elected General Secretary of the RDP in 1944, thereby migrating to Delhi. By 1946 Roy formulated the philosophy of New Humanism. By 1948 he and Roy decided that political parties were an inadequate instrument for promoting freedom of the people and so dissolved the RDP in December 1948. He returned to legal practice the same year.

== Radical Humanism ==
In 1969, Tarkunde founded the Indian Radical Humanist Association as an organisation for radical humanists. He also began editing the Radical Humanist (founded in 1937 by Roy as Independent India) in April 1970, supporting it initially with his own income. In 1973 he was one of the signers of the Humanist Manifesto.

== Emergency ==
During the emergency, he worked closely with Jayaprakash Narayan, providing leadership to the NGOs Citizens for Democracy and People's Union for Civil Liberties, of which he was the founding president. He also worked on the Citizen's Justice Committee and played a principal part in resisting and investigating the excesses of the period, including the 1984 Anti-Sikh riots, and human rights violations in the Punjab, Kashmir, and the North-East. His refusal to consider kashmiri pandits who had fled valley in 1990 as human right victims caused much controversy and led to his dubbing as " Terrorists' defender in chief" as he regularly attacked Indian army for fake encounters and extra judicial killings.In 1995, he departed from his earlier stand of considering firing by police as human rights violation and defended UP government in Muzaffarnagar police firing and rape on Uttarakhand state demand activists on 2 October 1994 in Supreme Court.His volte face was noted by honourable bench with humour and he won the case with court ruling that there was not adequate evidence of wilful human rights violation by State government.But it led to his breaking ranks with radical humanists.

Tarkunde was a board member for the International Humanist and Ethical Union(IHEU), the world union of Humanist organisations for over 40 years.

== Awards and honours ==
At the 1978 London Congress of the IHEU, VM Tarkunde received the International Humanist Award 1978. The Government of India awarded him the civilian honour of the Padma Bhushan in 1998.

== Books ==
1. Radical humanism: The philosophy of freedom and democracy
2. Report to the Nation:Oppression in Punjab
3. Communalism and human rights (J.P. memorial lecture)
4. Through humanist eyes
5. Radical humanism: The philosophy of freedom and democracy
6. For freedom
7. Kashmir problem: Possible solutions
8. Great Britain and India
9. The danger ahead: An analysis of congress capitalist alignment
