= Ilina Sen =

Indian activist

Professor Ilina Sen
- Died: 9 August 2020
- Occupations: Activist, Teacher, Author
- Spouse: Binayak Sen
- Children: 2

Ilina Sen (Bengali: ইলিনা সেন) was a human rights, trade union and feminist activist, as well as a teacher and author associated with the women's movement in India. She died on 9 August 2020, at the age of 69 after battling cancer for several years.

== Career ==
In 2004, Ilina started teaching at the Mahatma Gandhi Antarashtriya Hindi Vishwavidyalya in Wardha, where she joined as faculty in 2007. While at Wardha, she was the organising secretary of the Indian Association of Women's Studies (IAWS) conference in 2011 and then in Guwahati in February, 2014, during which she was also President of the IAWS.

In 2009, Ilina Sen went back to academics and taught at the Mahatma Gandhi Antarrashtriya Hindi Vishwavidyalaya in Wardha, Maharashtra before moving to Mumbai to teach at the Advanced Centre for Women’s Studies at the Tata Institute of Social Sciences. She was a Senior Fellow in the Nehru Memorial Library from July 2013 to July 2015.

== Activism in Chhattisgarh ==
In the early 1980s, Ilina moved to Chhattisgarh with her partner Binayak Sen, to work among the peoples of an Adivasi movement. Initially, Sen was involved with sustainable development to ensure the preservation of seed and rice varieties. She then started working in the trade union started by Shankar Guha Niyogi where she spent many years and worked with trade unions, Adivasis and the underprivileged.

The couple spent many years working in rural Madhya Pradesh and were associated with an independent union of workers in the iron ore mining belt of the then Madhya Pradesh, called the Chhattisgarh Mines Shramik Sangatan (CMSS). They also worked with the Shaheed hospital of the CMSS, to provide healthcare within a working-class movement.

She campaigned against the wrongful arrest of Adivasi men from central India and also battled for the release of Binayak, who was sentenced to life imprisonment by a trial court of Chhattisgarh on the charges of sedition and assisting Maoists or Naxalites. Binayak was eventually released in 2011. She is also remembered for her work at the NGO, Rupantar which became a role model of alternative healthcare in remote areas.

== Published work ==
In 1990, Ilina Sen authored a book called A Space within the Struggle on women's participation in people's movements. She followed that with two books on Chhattisgarh, Inside Chhattisgarh – A Political Memoir and The Migrant Woman of Chhattisgarh.

== External resources ==
- Interview with Ilina Sen
- Ilina Sen: "We should keep up the pressure to repeal sedition law."
