= Radical Democratic Party (India) =

Indian political party (1940–48)

Radical Democratic Party (RDP), was a political party in India which existed at the time of the Second World War. Also known as the Radical Communist Party. RDP evolved out of the League of Radical Congressmen, which had been founded in 1939 by former Communist International leader M.N. Roy. Roy founded Radical Democratic Party in 1940 with the purpose of engaging India in the war to support the Allies. RDP also worked for Indian independence. RDP was against the industrial strike that took place at the time.

During the period 1944–1948 the general secretary of RDP was V. M. Tarkunde.

The trade union wing of the Royists was the Indian Federation of Labour.

RDP was dissolved in 1948, to give place to the Radical Humanist movement.
