= K. G. Kannabiran =

Indian human rights activist and lawyer

- க. கோ. கண்ணபிரான்

National President, People's Union for Civil Liberties
- In office 1994–2009
- Preceded by: To be ascertained
- Succeeded by: To be ascertained

Personal details
- Born: Kandala Gopalaswamy Kannabiran; 9 November 1929 Madura, Madras Presidency, British India (now Madurai, Tamil Nadu, India)
- Died: 30 December 2010 (aged 81) Hyderabad, Andhra Pradesh (now in Telangana), India
- Spouse: Vasantha Kannabiran
- Relations: Srinivasa Raghavan
- Children: Chithra (daughter); Kalpana Kannabiran (daughter); Aravind (son)
- Parent: Pankajammal (mother) Kandala Gopalasawamy Iyengar (father)
- Occupation: Civil Liberties and Human Rights activist

Kandala Gopalaswamy Kannabiran (born 9 November 1929) was a human rights activist and a lawyer of the Andhra Pradesh High Court in the Indian state of Andhra Pradesh. He was the cofounder and National President of the People's Union for Civil Liberties.

== Early and personal life ==
Kannabiran was born in Madurai, Tamil Nadu to Kandala Gopalaswamy Iyengar, a doctor, and Pankajammal. His early education was in Hyderabad and Nellore and he was comfortable speaking Telugu. He obtained a BA Hons degree in economics (equivalent to Masters) and a degree in law from Madras University. He enrolled in the Madras Bar Council and started his practice in 1953 with the help of his advocate cousin Srinivasa Raghavan (Rajappa).

In 1959, he married Vasanth Kannabiran. He moved to Hyderabad and set up practice there soon after his marriage. The couple had three children. His elder daughter, Chitra Kannabiran, a molecular biologist, was born in 1960. His second daughter, Kalpana Kannabiran, a sociologist, was born in 1961; and his son, Arvind Kannabiran, a cinematographer, was born in 1966.

== Career ==
=== Lawyer ===
He practiced law in Madras (now Chennai) with moderate success and shifted to Hyderabad in 1960 soon after his marriage in 1959.

=== Human rights activist ===
Kannabiran started his career as an advocate in AP High court in the early 1960s. He defended human rights and political dissents cases, including Shankar Guha Niyogi, conspiracy cases and political prisoner cases. He was a founding member of PUCL and Andhra Pradesh Civil Liberties Committee and other human rights organizations. He took up cases of human rights violations, political dissidents and encounter cases, including four major conspiracy cases, Parvathipuram (Srikakulam district), Tarimela Nagi Reddy, Secunderabad and Ramnagar in 1975. Pleading his cases in the lower courts and even in the High Court in appeals, he ultimately succeeded in getting many of the accused in such political dissidence or opposition cases acquitted. Particularly, he succeeded in getting acquitted in the High Court, some accused persons, who were convicted and sentenced by the lower courts earlier.

== Civil liberties movement and formation of PUCL and APCLC ==
The origins of the civil liberties movement in India can be traced back to the days of our national movement for independence and Jawaharlal Nehru was one of the main motive forces and leaders of the All India Civil Liberties Union formed at that time. With independence, the defence of civil liberties has become necessary and urgent for various opposition parties, especially the Communist Party and the socialist parties, who were generally at the receiving end of state repression. In Andhra Pradesh especially the communists were at the forefront of civil liberties movement, and the various violations of human rights committed during the suppression of the 'naxalite movement' during the late sixties and early seventies gave rise to a powerful civil liberties movement opposing the state atrocities and demanding protection and promotion of fundamental rights and human rights of the activists as well as people in general.

The Andhra Pradesh Civil Liberties Committee was the main organization fighting for civil liberties and against state repression during 1969-75 period and Kannabiran was active in it since the early seventies. However, the real testing times came during emergency in 1975 when thousands of activists belonging to all opposition parties were arrested or harassed arbitrarily and thrown into jails in detention or on false criminal charges. Pattipati Venkateswarlu, advocate, President of the APCLC was also detained during the emergency for a brief period. And in the entire emergency period, Kannabiran and C. Padmanabha Reddy, advocates in the High Court of Andhra Pradesh at Hyderabad worked diligently for the release of innumerable detenus appearing in so many writ petitions filed in that regard.

During Emergency, worst repression was carried out against the naxalite movement and scores of naxalite activists were shot dead in false encounters in the name of maintaining law and order. A powerful people's movement organized under the leadership of Jayaprakash Narayan in the country ultimately led to the birth of Janata Party which contested in the 1977 General Elections announced by Indira Gandhi in January 1977 and conducted from 16 to 20 March 1977 during emergency still in force but with the trend of huge success of Janata Party and other opposition parties and rout of the ruling Congress party the emergency was ended the next day i.e. 21 March 1977.

This was a great victory for the people and also end of emergency. During emergency itself Jayaprakash Narayan and others took the initiative to form an active and militant civil liberties organization - PUCL & DR and the official website of PUCL narrates: "Jaya Prakash Narayan founded an organisation by the name of the Citizens for Democracy on 13th April 1974, with Jayaprakash as its President and VM Tarkunde as the General Secretary. After JP’s death (Justice) MC Chagla (Rtd.) became its President.

The CFD was established as a result of the mass movement built up by JP in response to the political and economic crisis in which the country had been plunged before the Emergency was declared. JP founded the People’s Union for Civil Liberties and Democratic Rights (PUCLDR), in 1976. This organization was meant to be complementary to the Citizens for Democracy (CFD). Now, the idea was to make the PUCLDR, unlike the CFD, an organisation free from political ideologies, so that people belonging to various political parties may come together on one platform for the defence of Civil Liberties and Human Rights. Era Sezhiyan was made the Convenor of a committee to set-up PUCLDR. A national seminar was held on October 17, 1976. It was inaugurated by Acharya JB Kripalani. The PUCLDR was a loosely organised group of people who were working with JP. V. M. Tarkunde was elected as President and Krishan Kant as General Secretary. The Emergency was lifted in 1977. The Janata Party, formed with the blessings of JP, came to power." Sri K.G. Kannabiran was very active in this PUCL & DR almost from its inception. The official website of PUCL again says: "During this time [Emergency], the police and the governments of states like Andhra Pradesh, West Bengal, Kerala, Bihar, Orissa, and Punjab started claiming ‘encounter killings’ of ‘naxalites’ with alarming frequency. A fear that these could be cold-blooded murders covered up as ‘encounters’, made Jaya Prakash Narayan set-up the Andhra Pradesh Civil Rights Committee comprising V M Tarkunde, Arun Shourie, Nabakrishna Chowdhury, MV Ramamurthy, Kaloji Narayan Rao, BG Verghese, Balwant Reddy, K Pratap Reddy, and KG Kannabiran. This Committee recorded extensive evidence and issued two reports in May and June 1977, establishing the fact, and giving the details, of the killing of 16 young boys labelled as “Naxalites”. These findings of the Committee [popular as the 'Tarkunde Committee'] that the boys had actually been arrested by the police from different places and then killed while in police custody provoked widespread anger in the country and there were demands for setting up an official commission of enquiry to look into these alleged murders. The Andhra Government, therefore, appointed a Commission, headed by Mr Justice Bhargava. KG Kannabiran and MV Ramamurthy who then presented the findings of the committee about these so called ‘encounter killings’ before the Commission. In the middle of the enquiry, the state government suddenly declared that its sittings would be in-camera. Kannabiran and Ramamurthy withdrew out of protest and the Commission was wound-up. It has, though, been established beyond doubt that the facts presented before the Commission were incontrovertible." Sri Kannabiran was one of the National Executive members of the PUCL. Kannabiran remained President of PUCL from 1995 to 2009.

== Writing ==
He published the book The Wages of Impunity — Power, Justice and Human Rights.

== Death ==
He died at age 81 after a brief illness in Hyderabad.
