= Citizens Justice Committee =

Indian umbrella organization

Citizen's Justice Committee
- Type: Non-profit
- Key people: Sarv Mittra Sikri, H. S. Phoolka, Rajinder Sachar, V. M. Tarkunde, Kuldip Nayar, Soli Sorabjee

Citizen's Justice Committee (commonly known as CJC) is an Indian umbrella organization of various human rights organizations and is known for pro bono representing the 1984 anti-Sikh riots victims in their legal battle to gain justice.

== Formation ==
The CJC was formed in May 1985, by H. S. Phoolka who became a counselor for the Citizens Justice Committee (CJC). The first activity of CJC was helping the victims of anti-Sikh riots file affidavits and testify before the first formal sitting of the Mishra Commission on 29 July 1985.

=== Withdrawal from Mishra Commission ===
The proceedings of the sitting of Mishra Commission were not made public or open to the press In protest, the CJC withdrew its cooperation from the Mishra Commission on 31 March 1986 because it disagreed with the commissions decision to hold secret proceedings. The CJC then started filing individual court cases.

== Members ==
The CJC was chaired by Justice Sarv Mittra Sikri. The CJC membership included Senior advocate of Delhi High Court H. S. Phoolka, Justice Ranjit Singh Narula, Soli Sorabjee, General Jagjit Singh Aurora (Bangladesh war veteran), Justice V. M. Tarkunde and journalist/columnist Khushwant Singh.

== Activism ==
The CJC has been representing the 1984 anti-Sikh massacre victims before various judicial commissions that have been formed for inquiry into the massacres.

== Disbanding ==
By 2000 the CJC had become largely defunct. Of the core team of the CJC its chairman Sikri had died in 1992, whilst Soli Sorabjee had been re-appointed as Attorney-General for India and V. M. Tarkunde had retired. Two other members of the CJC, Rajinder Sachar Kuldip Nayar, joined a new organization set up to replace the CJC, the Carnage Justice Committee.

== See also ==
- 1984 anti-Sikh riots victims have been represented by CJC since its inception.
- H. S. Phoolka spearheaded the formation of CJC.
- People's Union for Civil Liberties - some members of CJC also worked for this organization.
- Coordination of Democratic Rights Organisations
