= People's Union for Civil Liberties =

Indian human rights body

- Abbreviation: PUCL
- Founded: 1976
- Founder: Jayaprakash Narayan
- Type: Non-profit
- Location: 332, Ground Floor, Patpar Ganj, Opposite Anand Lok Apartments (Gate No.2) Mayur Vihar-I, Delhi-110091
- Website: www.pucl.org

People's Union for Civil Liberties (PUCL) is a human rights body formed in India in 1976 by Jayaprakash Narayan, originally under the name People's Union for Civil Liberties and Democratic Rights.

== Background ==
=== Indian emergency ===
Jayaprakash Narayan was a Gandhian leader in India after independence. When Indira Gandhi was found guilty of violating electoral laws by the Allahabad High Court, Narayan called for her to resign, and advocated a program of social transformation. He asked the military and police to disregard unconstitutional and immoral orders. However, Janata Party opposition leaders and dissenting members of Indira Gandhi's party, Congress (I) were arrested, beginning The Emergency in 1975. Narayan was detained at Chandigarh, and when released in 1976, formed the People's Union for Civil Liberties and Democratic Rights to oppose the suppression of civil and political rights during the emergency. According to the PUCL, it was a loosely organised group of people who were working with Narayan, a prominent figure in the Indian Opposition in the 1970s.

=== Post-1980 ===
After the return of Indira Gandhi to power in the 1980 elections in India, the organisation regained momentum and was renamed as the People's Union for Civil Liberties (PUCL). Its founding conference was held in November 1980.

Since 2023, the President of the PUCL is Kavita Srivastava, Renowned Social Activist, from Rajasthan, working against rising fascism and communalism, with the women's movement, the Convenor of the Right to Food Campaign and many other movements which have shaped India. The General Secretary is V. Suresh. eminent advocate, working with the Human rights movement for the last four decades. Other notable office bearers include Dr. Binayak Sen, Sudha Bharadwaj, Advocate N D Pancholi, Senior Counsei Mihir Desai, Farman Naqvi, R Murali, Surendra Kumar, Rohit Prajapati, Ashok Bharti, Father David solomon, Bhanwar Meghwanshi, Lara Jesani, Seema Azad, Y. Rajendra, S Balamurugan, Shahid Kamal, Arvind Avinash, Arvind Narrain, Kailash Meena, Mujahid Nafees, Sarfaraz, Sr. Sewti, among others.

== Activities ==
The founding conference of the PUCL in November 1980, drafted and adopted the organization's constitution, making it a membership based organization. The PUCL's constitution does not allow members of a political party to hold any office and hold membership in the PUCL; the number of members, belonging to political parties, in the national or state executive committees shall not be more than 50% of the members of the National Council and the National Executive Committee respectively (and also the corresponding bodies at the state and local level). The PUCL does not allow more than 10% of its members to be from the same political party.

V. M. Tarkunde served as president and editor-politician. Arun Shourie served as general secretary. Y. P. Chhibbar was appointed as executive secretary. Those elected as president and general secretary have included V. M. Tarkunde, Rajni Kothari, Rajinder Sachar, K. G. Kannabiran, Arun Shourie, Y. P. Chhibbar, Arun Jaitley, Satish Jha, Dalip Swami, and others.

It publishes a monthly journal in English, the PUCL Bulletin, that was founded by Satish Jha, Arun Jaitley, Smitu Kothari and Neeraja Chowdhary and helped bring a large number of people to the fold of PUCL. PUCL also organises a JP Memorial Lecture on 23 March every year, the date on which the Indian State of Emergency was lifted in 1977.

It presents its Journalism for Human Rights' Award which carries a citation and an award of Rs 20,000. PUCL, as its policy, does not accept money from any funding agency, Indian or foreign. All the expenses are met by the members, the office bearers, and the activists.

The PUCL supports grassroots movements that focus on organizing and empowering the poor rather than using state initiatives for change.

They have brought to light the cases of the bonded labourers, children in prison and violence committed against women undertrials.

The PUCL has worked on the issue of the hundreds of people detained by India and Pakistan's governments and accused of espionage after trivial crimes like minor trespassing, a problem linked to the tension caused by the Kashmir conflict.

== Charges against Dr Binayak Sen ==
Binayak Sen, who is the National Vice-President of the Union and General Secretary of its Chhattisgarh unit, was arrested in May 2007 by security agencies for his alleged links with Maoists. In 2010, Sen was convicted of sedition and several other offences under Indian Penal Code by Raipur Sessions Court in Chhattisgarh after finding him and two others, guilty of sedition for helping the Maoists in their fight against the state. He was sentenced to life imprisonment. After his conviction, he was later released by the Supreme Court of India though the apex court said it was giving no reason for granting bail and left it to the satisfaction of the trial court concerned to impose the conditions for his release on bail. His appeal against conviction is pending with the Chhattisgarh High Court.

== Notable people ==
- Mohammad Mohibul Haque, secretary of the PUCL Aligarh Unit

== See also ==
- Citizen's Justice Committee
- Confederation of Human Rights Organizations
- Association for Protection of Civil Rights
- Coordination of Democratic Rights Organisations
- People's Union for Democratic Rights
