= Association for Protection of Democratic Rights =

Indian human rights organisation based in West Bengal

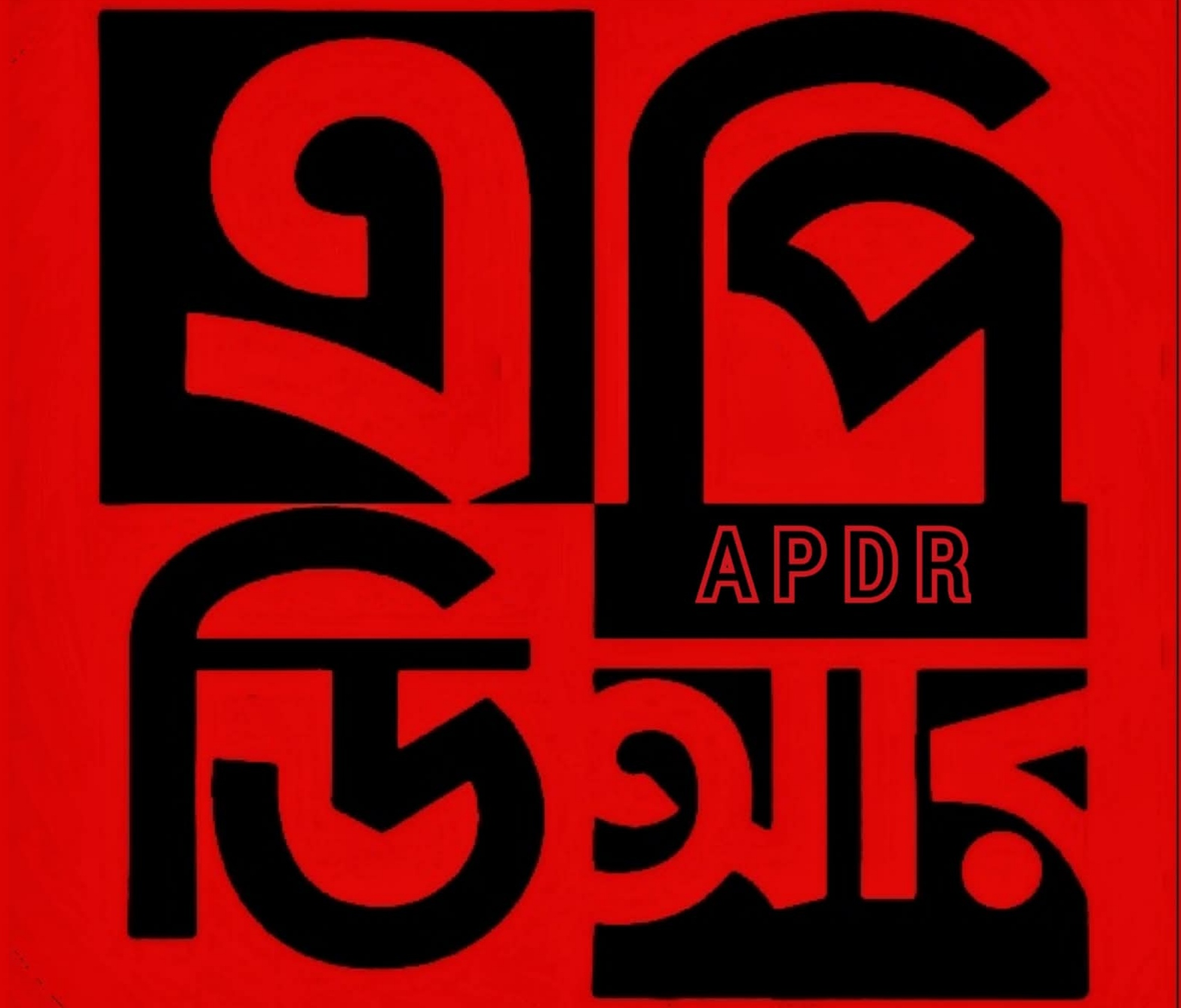
- Abbreviation: APDR
- Formation: 1972
- Type: Non-governmental organisation
- Legal status: Active
- Purpose: Human rights advocacy, civil liberties protection
- Headquarters: 18, Madan Baral Lane, Kolkata, West Bengal, India
- Region served: India
- Website: www.apdrwb.in

The Association for Protection of Democratic Rights (APDR) is one of India's oldest human rights organisations. It was founded in 1972 in Kolkota. The organisation focuses on civil liberties, political, social and cultural rights, recognition of political prisoners, and opposition of police brutality.

== History ==
APDR was founded in 25 June 1972. The founding primarily came from the start of the Naxalite movement. The organization's first declaration and committee was formed on the same day. Among the founders are Kapil Bhattacharya, Kalyani Das Bhattacharya, Pramod Ranjan Sengupta, Sushil Bandyopadhyay and Baren Dam.

During the Indian Emergency (1975–77), APDR was banned, with several members being arrested and their publication, Bharatiya Ganatantrer Swarup (The True Face of Indian Democracy), being proscribed and destroyed. It was eventually unbanned in 1977.

== Initiatives ==
Among the initiatives done by APDR include organising protests against the CPM, fighting the rights for naxalite activists and Kanoria Jute mill workers against protest suppression, recognition of political prisoners and their rights, and awareness against extra-judicial killings.

== See also ==
- People's Union for Civil Liberties
- Civil liberties in India
