= Orders, decorations, and medals of Eswatini =

The Swazi Honours System consists of orders and medals awarded for exemplary service to the nation.

Coat of Arms of Eswatini

== Civilian ==
Orders and Medals	Rank / Class	Note
Royal Order of King Sobhuza II	Grand Master	
Royal Order of the Ndlovukati	Grand Master	
Royal Order of the Crown	Grand Master	
Royal Family Order of Mswati III	Grand Master	
Royal Household Order of Swaziland	Grand Master	
Royal Order of the Elephant	Grand Master	

== Military ==
Orders and Medals	Rank / Class	Note
Military Order of weSwatini	Grand Master	
