= People's Watch Tamil Nadu =

- Founded: 1995
- Type: Non-profit

People's Watch is an Indian Human Rights NGO founded by a group of social activists in 1995 and is based in Madurai in the southern Indian state of Tamil Nadu.

Originally working solely in Tamil Nadu, People's Watch has recently moved into working at a national level with funding provided by the European Union and other donor agencies for the National Project on the Prevention of Torture in India. People's Watch is widely recognised as the leading Human Rights organisation in India.

From 1995 to 1998, People's Watch concentrated its activities on monitoring of human rights violations. This was the mandate of its governing body and the Program Advisory Board. It was soon realized that monitoring alone was insufficient. In 1998, People's Watch began legal intervention on behalf of victims. By 2000, this work had grown and more field monitoring associates were hired at both zonal and regional levels. By 2001, People's Watch was working in 11 areas of Tamil Nadu. Soon after, the need to launch a full-fledged awareness building Campaign for Human Rights became clear, and this was followed, soon afterward, by the realization that victim rehabilitation was also essential. Monitoring, intervention and even winning compensation from the courts was not enough for those who had survived torture, abuse and imprisonment. They desperately needed medical, psychological and vocational help as well. Preceding the United Nations Decade for Human Rights Education, People's Watch began a vigorous training and education program.

Building on its mandate to monitor human rights violations, People's Watch initiated its first Human Rights Education programme in Tamil Nadu schools during 1997–98, initially targeting ninth-standard students. Between 2002 and 2005, the programme expanded to students in standards 6–9 across nearly 800 schools in the state. The organisation later extended its educational initiatives to colleges, law students, trade unions, media groups, elected representatives and other civil society organisations. By 2004, the organisation had expanded its activities through strategic planning and broader outreach initiatives.

People's Watch is a member organization of the Asian Forum for Human Rights and Development (FORUM-ASIA).
