= Mohammad Mohibul Haque =

Aligarh Muslim University professor

Mohammad Mohib Al-Haque
- محمد محب الحق
- Born: Mohammad Mohib Al Haque; March 3, 1971 (age 55)
- Occupations: Professor, author, Islamic scholar

Mohammad Mohib-Al-Haque (Urdu: محمد محب الحق, born 3 March, 1971), also known as Muhibul Haque, is an Indian scholar and professor. He is a scholar of Sunni Islam and currently teaches international relations, Indian politics, minority rights, and human rights at Aligarh Muslim University.

== Professional life and political views ==
During his postgraduate studies at Aligarh Muslim University, Haque completed his PhD, earning the Dr. Shankar Dayal Sharma Gold Medal for academic excellence.

=== Indo–Palestinian relations ===
Haque has made claims about India's position on Palestine, believing that India should pursue relations with Palestine, instead of Israel.

=== Terrorism ===
Haque has defined terrorism as an act against humanity, stating that:

"An act of terror which involves the killing of innocent people is contrary to the spirit of the Quran and Islam because the holy book itself declares that to kill one human life is to kill all humanity and to save one human life is to save entire humanity. (Quran, 5:32). Islamic militancy is a misnomer in another sense as well. The so-called Islamic militancy has killed more Muslims than any other community, and the Muslims are the worst affected victims of terrorism."

== Bibliography ==
- International Terrorism and Violence: A Human Rights Perspective, Manak Publications, New Delhi, in collaboration with Aligarh Muslim University Press, Aligarh, 2011.
- Corporate Globalization and its Impact on Women in India, in Debalina Banerjee (ed), Boundaries of the Self: Gender, Culture and Spaces, Cambridge Scholars Publishing, Newcastle upon Tyne, U.K., 2014.
- Endangered Minorities in India: Understanding the Role of Police, in Asghar Ali Engineer and A.S. Narang (eds), Minorities and Police in India, Manohar Publications, New Delhi, 2006.
- The UN in the Unipolar World, in T.A. Nizami (ed) Jawahar Lal Nehru: The Architect of India’s Foreign Policy, Icon Publications, New Delhi, 2006.
- Police Atrocities and Endangered Minorities in India, Abdulrahim Bijapur (ed.) Implementing Human Rights in the Third World: Essays on Human Rights, Dalits and Minorities, Manak Publications, New Delhi, 2008.
- Appeasement of Muslims: Myth and Reality, Resurging India: National and International Scenario, Icon publications, New Delhi, 2009.
- Police and Minorities, Santosh Bharatiya (ed), Dalit and Minority Empowerment, Rajkamal Prakashan, New Delhi, 2008.
- Perspectives on Sir Syed and the Aligarh Movement, A. R. Kidwai (ed)Sir Syed Ahmad Khan, Muslim Renaissance Man of India, a Bicentenary Commemorative Volume, Viva Books, New Delhi,2017.
- Indian Constitution and Rights of Minorities: An Overview in Arshi Khan(ed.) Exclusion of Muslims in India: Tolerance, Participation, and Legitimacy of the State. Genuine Publications, New Delhi, 2017.
- Indian Judiciary and Minority Rights: A study of Select Cases, in Arshi Khan(ed.) Exclusion of Muslims in India, Tolerance, Participation and Legitimacy of the State, Genuine Pub, New Delhi, 2017.
- Constituent Assembly Debates on Minority Rights”, P-09, Human Rights of Minorities, Module-04, UGC E-pathshala.
- National Commission for Minorities: Protecting the Legal and Constitutional Rights of Minorities in India, P-09, Human Rights of Minorities, Module -08, UGC E-pathshala.

== Links ==
- Irfan Habib
- Faizan Mustafa
- Shakeel Ahmed Samdani
