= National Commission for Religious and Linguistic Minorities =

National Commission for Religious and Linguistic Minorities, also called Ranganath Misra Commission, was constituted by Government of India on 29 October 2004 to look into various issues related to Linguistic and Religious minorities in India. It was chaired by former Chief Justice of India Justice Ranganath Misra, member of Rajya Sabha from 1998 to 2004. The commission submitted the report to the Government on 21 May 2007.

== Terms of reference ==
Initially, the commission was entrusted with the following terms of reference:

1. To suggest criteria for identification of socially and economically backward sections among religious and linguistic minorities;
2. To recommend measures for welfare of socially and economically backward sections among religious and linguistic minorities, including reservation in education and government employment; and
3. To suggest the constitutional, legal and administrative modalities required for the implementation of its recommendations.

After nearly five months of its work the Commission’s Terms of Reference were modified so as to add the following:

1. To give its recommendations on the issues raised in WPs 180/04 and 94/05 filed in the Supreme Court of India, and in certain High Courts, relating to Para 3 of the Constitution (Scheduled Castes) Order 1950 in the context of the ceiling of 50 percent on reservations, as also the modalities for inclusion in the list of Scheduled Castes.

== Main recommendations ==
- Give 10% quotas for Muslims and 5% for other minorities in government jobs and in seats in all the higher educational institutions (graduation and above)
- Reserve 8.4% quota out of the existing OBC quota of 27% for religious minorities, mainly Muslims
- Permit Dalits who convert to Islam or Christianity to avail of reservation benefits under the Scheduled Caste reservation quota.

== Leaked ==
TwoCircles.net, an online Indian news organization has started publishing excerpts from this report since June 2009.

== Criticism ==
Since the submission India's national party, BJP has been opposing the Ranganath Misra's recommendation fiercely. In 2010, BJP's senior official and CM of Madhya Pradesh Shivraj Singh Chouhan stated "prime minister Jawaharlal Nehru had opposed reservation for converted SCs and STs". In 2011, The BJP decided to file a PIL against a report recommending Scheduled Caste quotas for all minorities that could lead to Dalit Christians and Muslims coming within its ambit. On 9 February 2014, Narendra Modi during his prime-ministerial campaign in Kerala he criticised Mishra's report for creating "insecurities of the Dalit communities".

On 7 December 2023, Solicitor General of India Tushar Mehta submitted before a three-judge Bench led by Justice Sanjay Kishan Kaul Supreme Court of India that the Ranganath Misra Commission's report was flawed and hence was rejected by the Government of India. He said, "It was written within the four walls of a room. There was no field study done. The Commission (Misra) took a myopic view of the social milieu in India.”

== Bibliography ==
- Vishwanath, Rupa (2015), "Commissioning Representation: The Misra Report, Deliberation and the Government of the People in Modern India", South Asia: Journal of South Asian Studies, 38 (3): 495–511, doi:10.1080/00856401.2015.1049773
- Kumar, Arvind (July 2023), "Exclusion of Pasmanda Muslims and Dalit Christians from the Scheduled Caste Quota", South Asia Research, 43 (2): 192–209, doi:10.1177/02627280231161000
