= Confederation of Human Rights Organizations =

Indian human rights organisation

National Confederation of Human Rights Organizations
- Founded: 1997
- Dissolved: 2022
- Type: Non-profit
- Location: India
- Fields: Human Rights
- Key people: Mukandan C.Menon
- Website: https://www.nchro.org/

National Confederation of Human Rights Organizations (NCHRO) is a human rights organisation based in India which watches human rights violations all over India

It has brought many research reports and papers with the help of other international human rights organisations like Human Rights Watch International

In September 2022, NCHRO was banned under the UAPA by the Ministry of Home Affairs, along with 8 other organizations, for being affiliated with the Popular Front of India (PFI). The MHA further claimed that the NCHRO was monitored and coordinated by PFI leaders.

== Activities ==
National Confederation of Human Rights Organizations (NCHRO) was formed with the aim to protect, uphold and strengthen the rights of traditionally exploited and oppressed marginalized social segments of Tribals, Dalits, Minorities, Backward Castes, Women, Children and victims of State Violations.

== History ==
NCHRO was formed in May 1997. Mukundan C. Menon was its founder and first secretary general It then started coordinating individuals and groups all over Kerala who were working for human rights. In June 2007, the CHRO became a national organization and claims it has chapters in chapters Tamil Nadu, Karnataka, Andhra Pradesh, Rajasthan, Goa, New Delhi and Odisha.
