= Shalu Nigam =

Indian lawyer

- Education: Ph.D., MA Social Work, LLB
- Alma mater: Delhi University; Jamia Millia Islamia
- Occupations: Lawyer, Feminist legal scholar, Activist
- Known for: Women's rights advocacy; Shalu Nigam v. Regional Passport Officer

Shalu Nigam is an Indian lawyer, feminist legal scholar, and author. She was the petitioner in the landmark case Shalu Nigam v. Regional Passport Officer, decided on 17 May 2016, which held that applicants can be issued passports without requiring the name of the father.

== Biography ==
Shalu Nigam is a lawyer, feminist legal scholar, author and TEDx speaker.

Her books include Domestic violence in India: What one should know? (a resource book), Women and Domestic Violence Law in India: A Quest for Justice, Domestic Violence Law in India: Myth and Misogyny, Dowry is a Serious Economic Violence: Rethinking Dowry Law in India, and Single Mothers, Patriarchy and Citizenship in India: Rethinking Lone Motherhood through the Lens of Socio-legal and Policy Framework. She also co-authored The Founding Mothers: 15 Women Architect of the Indian Constitution.

She is a contributor to Countercurrents.org, Mainstream Weekly, Indian Journal of Gender Studies, and the South Asia Journal.

== Education and career ==
Nigam graduated from the Lady Irwin College, University of Delhi in 1990. She received her LLB from Delhi University, and a degree in MA in Social Work from Jamia Millia Islamia. She also obtained her doctorate in Social Work from Jamia Millia Islamia in 2002. The topic of her research was "Changing doctor-patient relationship with special reference to the consumer protection act,1986"

Her post-doctoral fellowship at the Centre for Women's Development Studies was supported by the Indian Council of Social Science Research.

She has also been associated with and served as a Secretary of the People's Union for Civil Liberties (PUCL) Delhi. In September 2024 Nigam was elected as a Vice President PUCL Delhi. More specifically, she curated the Delhi PUCL internship program for students from the law and social sciences background.

She started her career working with the United Nations High Commission for Refugees, Delhi office. Previously, she has worked with the Indian Social Institute, New Delhi on legal literacy, gender sensitization, legal awareness, legal research, training of para legals, training of trainers on human rights, prison reforms, and legal aid, besides preparing legal modules, training manuals, booklets and other training material

She is also associated with the Impact and Policy Research Institute, Delhi as a Visiting Senior Fellow and initiated the Law and Public Policy Youth Fellowship as a Convener and Fellowship Lead Advisor as well as the online course on Ending Violence Against Women as a Convener and Master Trainer.

Nigam contributed to the training modules for filing RTIs, and later, established the We the People Network and the Indian Renaissance Club to promote legal awareness and sensitization. She connected her research to advocacy on the issues relating to gender justice, equality, and democratic participation.

In 2020, Nigam presented a paper in the Beijing Platform for Action at 25 Conference organized by the UNSW on the resistance and backlash against women's rights and in 2019 she shared lived experiences of Indian women facing dowry violence within and outside India in the Dowry Abuse Summit organized by UNSW and ACHRH

== Research and Writing ==
Nigam has extensively explored the legacy of the women who played key roles in the Indian Constituent Assembly, often referred to as the Founding Mothers of the Indian Constitution. She challenges critiques that focus on these women's privileged backgrounds, arguing that such narrow perspectives ignore the broader historical context of their transformative activism and the significant impact they had on gender equality debates

Building on this historical legacy, Nigam has also examined the creation of the Uniform Civil Code (UCC), advocating for it to be shaped by women's lived experiences. She proposed a Feminist Code rooted in a Praxis-driven approach, emphasizing the importance of considering women's realities in legal reform.

Additionally, Nigam's research delves into Ellen Gottschalk Roy and M.N. Roy's ideas on radical democracy, the Constituent Assembly, and feminist thought These figures made foundational contributions to the Indian Constitution as well as globally played a significant role emphasizing human rights and inclusive governance. Nigam argues that these figures represent a unified legacy of progressive thought and action, one that sought to challenge the status quo and create a just, equitable, and inclusive society in India.

Nigam has been cited for her expertise on issues related to the rights of women, including legal and other protections for survivors of domestic violence, Battered Woman Syndrome, the right of self-defense, marital rape law, property rights, caste and the status of women, backlash against women's rights in the COVID-19 era, and the increase in violence against women during the COVID-19 pandemic. She has also been cited for her advocacy related to education in India. She is also known for her work on lawyers' dress, women human rights defenders, vaccine equity and on transparency in governance

== Advocacy ==
In April 2018, she joined the group of lawyers in Delhi who took out a silent protest march demanding that the lawyers in the Kathua rape case in Jammu and Kashmir who stood for the accused should be punished by the cancellation of licenses.

In 2020, she was one of over 600 activists, lawyers and academics who called for the release of Sudha Bharadwaj and Shoma Sen. On 15 July 2020, she joined other lawyers and wrote to the Chief Justice of Patna High Court regarding the treatment of survivors of violent sexual crimes in the Araria District Court.

During the COVID-19 pandemic and the imposed lockdown, women faced violence in homes. Nigam raised this issue of women and child abuse. Subsequently, the then Delhi government introduced several measures to safeguard the victims, and a petition was filed regarding the same

In July 2021, Nigam joined 900 individuals and groups condemning and calling for action against hate speech and misogyny directed at Muslim women online. In August 2021 she joined over 650 women's rights activists and others who have denounced Union minority affairs’ minister Mukhtar Abbas Naqvi’s decision to commemorate the criminalisation of instant triple talaq as ‘Muslim Women’s Rights Day’. In November, 2021, she joined over 200 eminent citizens, including professors, civil servants, journalists and prominent activists who wrote an open letter to the Chief Justice of India, to draw his attention to the pending status of key matters in Supreme Court, covering issues from sedition, farm laws, Citizenship Amendment Act, electoral bonds among others.

In February 2022, she joined legal academics, lawyers, and students to write an open letter against the Karnataka High Court judgment that denied entry to young Muslim women wearing the hijab in the educational spaces. In May 2022, she joined a group of academics and professionals to write a letter to the Chief Minister of Delhi against demolition carried out in Jahangirpuri resettlement colony in Delhi In June 2022, she joined 300 citizens and wrote to the Chief Justice of India against the arrest of activist Teesta Setalvad and RB Sreekumar In August 2022, Nigam joined 6000 citizens to speak in support of continuous struggle of Bilkis Bano for justice after the State of Gujarat issued an order for remission of sentences for 11 convicts of gangrape and mass murder on the independence day

In 2023, she joined over 550 individuals and organizations to condemn violence and divisive politics in Manipur. Along with 500 citizens, activists, and organizations, she condemned misuse of the Prevention of Money Laundering Act against scholars and activists. She also joined 1150 activists, lawyers, academics, and concerned citizens to condemn brutal police action against protesting women wrestlers who were demanding justice in the cases of sexual harassment against the chief of Wrestling Federation of India.

In December 2023, she became a signatory to the International Convention Against War and Destructive Use of Science: Scientists Against Israel Apartheid, Occupation and Genocide in Gaza along with 500 scientists and academics from 40 countries

Nigam along with many other civil society activists and organizations also wrote an open letter to the Chief Justice of India on the suppression of free speech and action against peaceful protestors to stifle democratic dissent. In 2024, she joined over 2200 citizens and wrote to the Chief Election Commissioner of India to take action against the hate speeches by the politicians during elections. She along with 250 activists and scholars to condemn raids on Harsh Mander and his NGO.

In August 2024, along with fellow Indian citizens, she condemned the brutal state violence in Bangladesh and expressed solidarity for the struggles to establish peace and democracy

In December 2025, Nigam joined several organizations and individuals to launch a `Beware of Aadhaar Campaign' flagging the concerns relating to surveillance, exclusion, and rights violations

Nigam, in her research, presented dowry as economic exploitation, rather than as a custom or tradition. In July 2026, she submitted a petition to the United Nations to declare International Dowry Elimination Day.

== Shalu Nigam v. Regional Passport Officer ==
Her daughter was born on 24 August 1997, and raised by Nigam, who had divorced her biological father. According to Nigam, her child was rejected by her father because she is female. In 2005 and 2011, Nigam was able to obtain a passport for her daughter without providing the name of her father, but at the next renewal, the computer application required it. Nigam brought a case to the Delhi High Court based on a violation of the right of her daughter to determine her name and identity. Nigam also asserted an injury to her daughter, if she was required to record the name of her father, due to the nature of the rejection by her father.

The Regional Passport Office (RPO) attorney argued RPO regulations forbade the removal of the name of a parent due to divorce, and argued it was an established legal principle that the dissolution of a parent-child relationship could only occur due to adoption. The Court found no legal requirement for the inclusion of the name of the father and directed that the computer software be changed to allow the issuance of the passport without requiring the name of the father. In its remarkable 17 May 2016 decision, the Court also stated, "This court also takes judicial notice of the fact that families of single parents are on the increase due to various reasons like unwed mothers, sex workers, surrogate mothers, rape survivors, children abandoned by father and also children born through IVF technology."

After advocacy by Women and Child Development Minister Maneka Gandhi to Foreign Affairs Minister Sushma Swaraj about the need to amend the passport rules for single women, a panel was created in July 2016 to debate and recommend changes, and its recommendations to ease the requirements were informed by the case. In December 2016, the Ministry of External Affairs announced new passport rules based on the panel recommendations, including to allow only one parent to be listed in the application.

Several scholars have noted the impact of the case on the rights of women in India.

== Selected works ==
=== Books ===
- Nigam, Shalu (2008). Domestic Violence in India: What One Should Know? (A Resource Book). We the People Trust. ISBN 978-8190367141.
- Scaria, Mary; Nigam, Shalu (2016). The Founding Mothers: 15 Women Architects of the Indian Constitution. Delhi: Media House. ISBN 9789374956366.
- Nigam, Shalu (2020). Women and Domestic Violence Law in India: A Quest for Justice. Routledge India. ISBN 9780367777715.
- Nigam, Shalu (2021). Domestic Violence Law in India: Myth and Misogyny. Routledge India. ISBN 9780367344818.
- Nigam Shalu (2023) Dowry is a Serious Economic Violence: Rethinking Dowry Law in India ISBN 9798394429057
- Nigam Shalu (2024) "Single Mothers, Patriarchy and Citizenship in India: Rethinking Lone Motherhood through the Lens of Socio-legal and Policy Framework" We the People Network, Delhi NCR ISBN 9798879683103
- Nigam, Shalu (27 September 2024). Dowry is a Serious Economic Violence: Rethinking Dowry Law in India. Cambridge Scholars Publishing. ISBN 978-1-0364-1270-8.
- Nigam Shalu (2025) Human Rights in Everyday Life in India: A Praxis From Below, Cambridge Scholars Publishing, ISBN 978-1-0364-4929-2
- Nigam Shalu (2025) Towards an Inclusive Gender Just Code in India: Women's Rights are Non-Negotiable, We the People Network, Delhi NCR
- Nigam Shalu (2026) Beyond Domesticity: Reimagining Home Science Education for Safe and Equitable Homes, We the People Network, Delhi NCR

=== Chapters ===
- Nigam Shalu (2018) #MeTooIndia is a tip of an iceberg and has shaken the patriarchy's core In #MeToo - A Blow to Patriarchy, Edited by Binu Mathew Published by People's Literature Publication and countercurrents.org ISBN 9788193471470
- Nigam Shalu (2022) Adjudicating Domestic Violence in the Courts, In Routledge Readings on Law, Development and Legal Pluralism, Ecology, Families, Governance, Edited by Kalpana Kannabiran, ISBN 9781032269283

=== Papers ===
- Nigam Shalu (2005) Understanding Justice Delivery System from the Perspective of Women Litigants as Victims of Domestic Violence in India (Specifically in the Context of Section 498-A, IPC), Occasional Paper No 39, CWDS, New Delhi
- Nigam Shalu (2008) Legal Literacy: A Tool for Empowerment, Social Action, Volume 58 Issue (2) pp. 216–226
- Nigam Shalu (2014) Violence, Protest and Change: A Socio-Legal Analysis of Extraordinary Mobilization after the 2012 Delhi Gang Rape Case, International Journal of Gender and Women's Studies June 2014, Vol. 2, No. 2, pp. 197–221
- Nigam Shalu (2017) Is Domestic Violence A Lesser Crime? Countering The Backlash Against Section 498A, IPC, Occasional Paper No 61, CWDS, New Delhi
- Nigam Shalu (2020) COVID-19: Right to Life with Dignity and Violence in Homes, SPRI Vision, XI (1) 97-120
- Nigam Shalu (2020) A Hindu Daughter’s Right to Property: Is the retrospective amendment of Section 6 of the Hindu Succession Act a step towards women’s economic empowerment?, Legal News and Views, Volume 34 No.9 September Issue page 2-8
- Nigam Shalu (2024) Guardianship Law in India: Examining the Principle of ‘Best Interests’ of Minors and the Rights of Single Mothers as Sole Guardians Indian Journal of Gender Studies, Vol. 31 Issue 3 p. 308-327
- Nigam Shalu (2025) "Resisting Gendered Citizenship: The Politics of Colonialism, Nationalism, and Maternalism in India" Gender and Women's Studies Volume 6 No. 1 DOI: 10.31532/GendWomensStud.6.1.001

=== More ===
- Nigam Shalu (2023) "Gender-Based Violence BGS-012: Course Material" IGNOU (co-author)
- Nigam Shalu (2019) Gender Specific Laws on Violence in India, In Training Manual for Legal Empowerment of Women and Girls with Physical Disabilities in India, Editor Renu Addlakha, Center for Women's Development Studies, New Delhi
- Nigam Shalu (2019) Domestic Violence, In Training Manual for Empowerment of Women and Girls with Disabilities in India, Editor Renu Addlakha, Center for Women's Development Studies, New Delhi
- Nigam Shalu (2016) Translation of Food Security: National Food Security Act and Community Mobilization, A Training of Trainers Manual, By Sachin Kumar Jain, Vikas Sanvad, Lok Manch Secretariat
- Nigam Shalu (2014) Yes, I am a woman, Countercurrents.org, 28 July
- Nigam Shalu (2021) Every little girl has a dream, a dream that will not die, Countercurrents.org, 27 September
- Nigam Shalu (2021) MeeLord! I am seeking justice as a citizen! Countercurrents.org, 20 November
- Nigam Shalu (2022) The Curses of Patriarchy, 8 November

=== In Hindi ===
- सूचना का अधिकार: कुछ सामाजिक वे कानूनी पहलू We the People Trust, Delhi ISBN 9788190367134
- दहेज प्रथा अभी भी क्यों कायम है जब कानून द्वारा इसे प्रतिबंधित कर दिया गया?
- लिव-इन रिलेशनशिप में महिलाओं के खिलाफ हिंसा और कानूनी सुरक्षा (2023)
- जब घूंघट बना इंक़लाब का परचम : हिजाब, नारीवाद और निरंकुशता
- एलेन गॉट्सचॉक रॉय की विरासत: भारत में विश्वव्यापी नारीवाद और नव-मानववाद
- हंसा मेहता: मानवाधिकारों की योद्धा

== Personal life ==
Nigam is a single mother and a survivor of violence

== See also ==
- Domestic violence in India
- Protection of Women from Domestic Violence Act, 2005
- Dowry death
