= Thomas Kunnunkal =

Indian Catholic priest (1926–2026)

- Born: 3 July 1926; Alappuzha, Travancore, British India
- Died: 28 January 2026 (aged 99); Delhi, India
- Occupations: Catholic priest, educationist
- Awards: Padma Shri; Commonwealth of Learning Fellow

Thomas V. Kunnunkal (3 July 1926 – 28 January 2026) was an Indian Jesuit priest, educationist and writer. He was a onetime chairman of the Central Board of Secondary Education (CBSE), a onetime director of the Indian Social Institute, New Delhi (2008–2009), and the President of the Islamic Studies Association, a non-governmental organization promoting religious harmony. The Government of India awarded him the fourth highest Indian civilian award of Padma Shri in 1974.

== Biography ==
Thomas Kunnunkal was born on 3 July 1926 in Alappuzha, a coastal town in Travancore, and completed his school education at a local boarding school. He completed his college education in India and later, in the US, majoring in English, Philosophy, Theology, Educational Administration and Educational Measurement, after which he joined the Society of Jesus on 20 June 1945. He started his career as the principal of St. Xavier's Senior Secondary School, New Delhi, and held the post for two terms (1962–1974 and 1977–1979). He headed the Central Board of Secondary Education of the Government of India from 1980 to 1987 and was the consultant to the Ministry of Human Resource Development for the turn-key project to establish the National Open School, New Delhi. When the institution was opened in 1989, Kunnunkal was appointed the chairman of the institution, a position he served in until 1992. He was associated with the Jesuit Education Association of India which controls 101 high schools and 25 colleges in India managed by the Society of Jesus, and was its president and the general secretary on different tenures.

He served two central government commissions, the National Commission for Teachers (1983) and the National Commission for Review of National Education Policy (1987) as a member. He held the post of research director of the Indian Social Institute from 2008 to 2009 and was a founding member and onetime director of the Educational Planning Group (EPG) of the Roman Catholic Archdiocese of Delhi. He was also associated with the Islamic Studies Association as its president and with Dharma Bharati Mission as an associate. He published a book, The Role of Teachers in National Regeneration, which was released in 2005. The Government of India awarded him the civilian honour of Padma Shri in 1974 and he was selected as an honorary fellow of the Commonwealth of Learning, Vancouver, an intergovernmental organization under the Commonwealth Heads of Government (CHOGM), which promotes education, in 2006.

Kunnunkal died in Civil Lines, Delhi on 28 January 2026, at the age of 99.

== See also ==
- St. Xavier's School, Delhi
- National Institute of Open Schooling
- Society of Jesus
- Indian Social Institute
