= Manwani =

Manwani is a surname. Notable people with the surname include:

- Harish Manwani (born 1952), Indian business executive
- Mehak Manwani (born 1996), Indian actress
