= Bombay Provincial Working Class Party =

Political party in British India

The Bombay Provincial Working Class Party was a political party formed amongst followers of M.N. Roy in the Bombay Province, India, in 1933. The aim of the party was the 'establishment of a socialist state involving the destruction of capitalism and control of the economic life of the country by workers' and peasants' councils' and the immediate objective of the party was national independence from British colonial rule.

The president of the party was A.A. Alwe and the general secretary of the party was V.B. Karnik. Vice-presidents were R.A. Khedgikar, S.H. Jhabwala, Abdul Majid and Lalji Pendse and secretaries were Dr. M.R. Shetty, Ahmed Miya (leader of the Dock Workers' Union), B.L. Sarang and B.R. Shinde. Treasurers were Maniben Kara and V.H. Joshi.
