= St. Xavier's Senior Secondary School, Delhi =

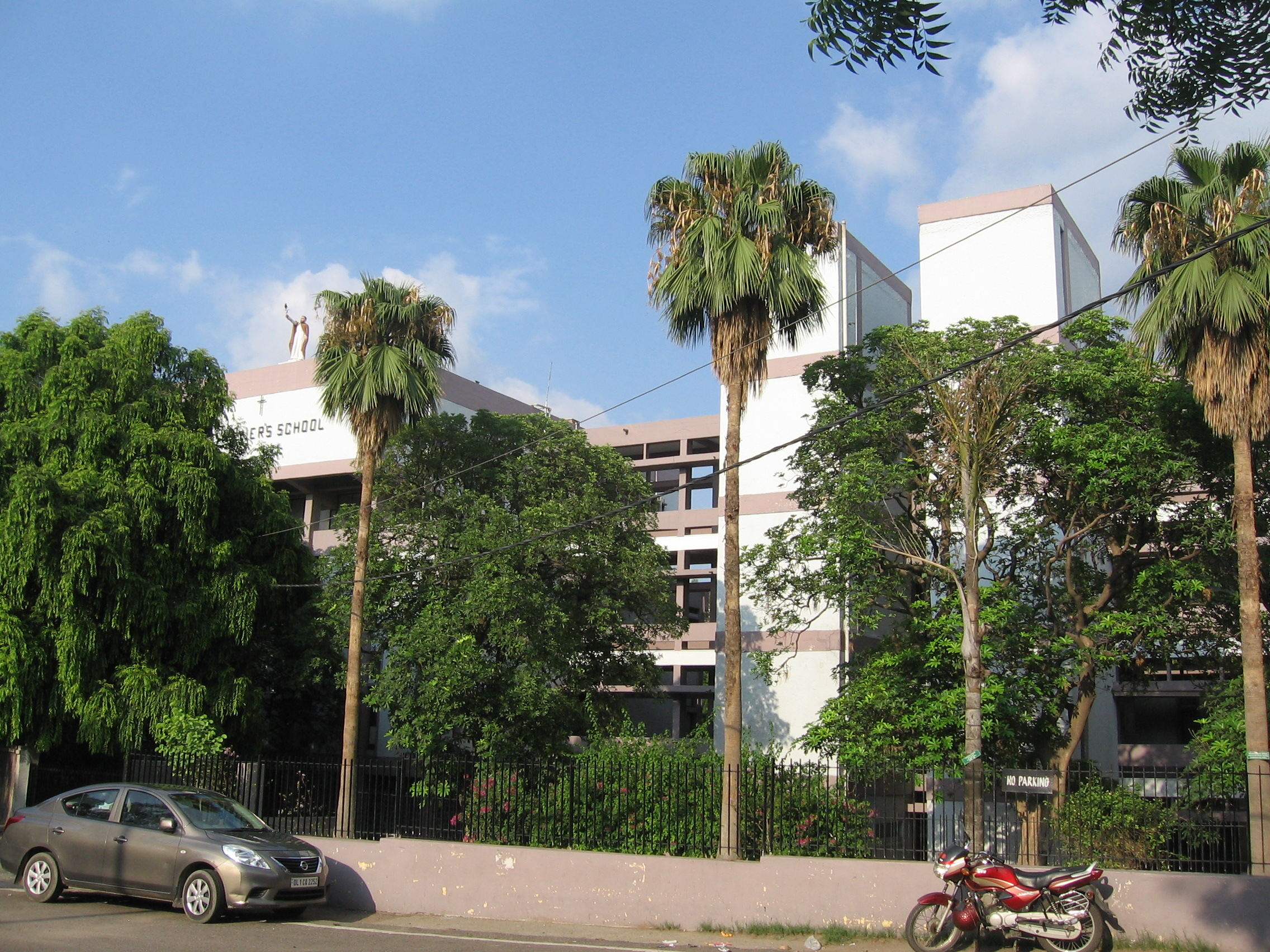

Location
- 4, Raj Niwas Marg, Civil Lines; North Delhi; India; 28°40′22″N 77°13′16″E

Information
- Type: Private primary and secondary school; Christian minority school
- Religious affiliation: Catholicism
- Denomination: Jesuits
- Established: 1960; 66 years ago
- Gender: Co-educational
- Campus: North Delhi & Rohini
- Accreditation: Directorate of Education, Delhi Administration
- Affiliation: Central Board of Secondary Education
- Website: www.stxaviersdelhi.com

St. Xavier's Senior Secondary School is a private Catholic primary and secondary school located in Raj Niwas Marg in the Civil Lines area of North Delhi, in India. Founded by the Jesuits in 1960 as a residential school for boys only, the school has become a Christian minority neighbourhood co-educational school catering for students from preparatory to Grade 12. The school is recognised by the Directorate of Education, Delhi Administration, and is affiliated to the Central Board of Secondary Education for the All India Secondary School Examination and All India Senior School Certificate Examination.

An affiliated school in nearby Rohini includes a junior school, vocational training institute, and a National Institute of Open Schooling (afternoon tutorial). This school occupied its new site on 1 May 1998 and has enjoyed the administrative assistance of the Congregation of Jesus (CJ) sisters since 2006.

== History ==
At its establishment in 1960, the school used the grounds and buildings of Hotel Cecil, well known in the British Raj era, purchased for that purpose. The luxury hotel, situated on Rajniwas Marg in the Civil Lines area of Delhi in an 11-acre (4.5 ha) park, had over a hundred rooms, large lawns, and a swimming pool. The Patna Province of the Society of Jesus bought it (including the premises and the services of the hotel employees) from the siblings Mr. Edwin Hotz and Mrs. Pauline White, who were of Swiss/English extraction, and was granted permission by the Commissioner of Delhi to convert it into a residential school for boys and girls (Coed).

St. Xavier's School was inaugurated on 6 January 1960 by the Archbishop His Excellency James Knox, the representative of the Vatican in India, under the stewardship of Jesuit Fr. Frank Loesch, the first Rector. Loesh went on to buy the adjacent land from the Gujarati Samaj and further on the Bombay House, for later expansion. In the following week admissions for new classes began, starting with Std. V and reaching down to Prep. At the end of the week there were, remarkably, over 700 boys enrolled. It was granted recognition by the Directorate of Education within a month of its inception.

Fr. Charles Saldhana, born 13 January 1892, attended St. Xavier's College, Bombay. He began his Jesuit career as a professor of mathematics in Pune and Dharwar. He then became the first principal of St. Xavier's College, Ranchi, and from 1951-1952 the first principal of Nirmala College, Delhi University, the present Kirori Mal College. In 1959, at the age of 67, Fr. Charles was asked to be first principal of St. Xavier's in Delhi, his "Benjamin" as he remarked, the child of his old age. He fell ill on the day the school was inaugurated, but remained principal until July. Then he was appointed the headmaster of the prep department and supervised the math program for the entire school. He worked with Frs. Loesch, Rodrigues, and Austin Reinboth in converting the hotel campus into a modern public school. After 14 years in Delhi he returned to Patna and remained active in the Jesuit community. In the fall of 1978 he returned to Delhi for his retreat and died on 27 November 1978. His mortal remains are buried in Delhi.

The prep classes were held in Bombay House while the five buildings of the hotel accommodated some classrooms and dorms with four to five boys in a room which had the unusual facility of a dressing area and attached toilets. Parts of the residential quarters were renovated to accommodate the staff.

At the same time work was begun on the five-storied school buildings. Many of the old buildings were destroyed but some were retained and remain in use, like the Fathers' residence, chapel, hall, Snob's Row, and the swimming pool. Modern classrooms, teacher's tutorial rooms, science laboratories, a library, and a host of other facilities were constructed and a large playing field created by leveling the ground occupied by a road that had cut across the area. By 1965, the Junior and the Senior school buildings were ready and occupied, and Fr. Thomas Kunnunkal took over from Fr. Thomas Athazhapadam. Fr. Kunnunkal, who was later awarded Padma Shri, was responsible for much of the pattern the school adopted in later years. Hostel and boarding facilities were discontinued in December 1971 and the hostel building was converted into a Jesuit house of formation.

In the 1980s St. Xavier's switched from English to Hindi as the medium of instruction in junior classes. This measure (along with the decision to set apart 25% of seats for the poor – with subsidized uniform/books/tuition) was a part of changing the image of the school from one of "school for affluents" to one of "school for local needs". A large number of parents pulled their children out of school and many teachers left. The school continued its policy of teaching in Hindi in the belief that younger children learn best in their mother tongue.

In 1985, the school admitted girls, starting from prep grade, and is now fully co-educational.

In 2007, St Xavier's again switched from Hindi to English as the medium of instruction in junior classes.

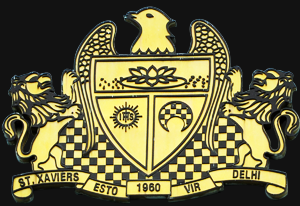
The School Emblem Of St. Xavier's Senior Secondary School

== School emblem ==
The two lions (similar to the four atop the Ashoka Pillar holding the Dharma Chakra, the Wheel Of Order) hold the Xavier crest aloft, proclaiming the ideals of the Republic of India and its heritage symbolised by the Lotus, the flower of India.

The IHS (the first three letters in Greek of the name Jesus) symbolise the Society of Jesus; the moonlike chequered and inverted crescent is taken from the Coat-of-Arms of the House of Xavier symbolizing Saint Francis Xavier after whom the school is named.

The inscription at the bottom proclaims that St. Xavier's school was founded in 1960 and is located in Delhi. Esto Vir (Latin for "Be a man") is taken from the farewell instruction of King David to his son and royal successor, Solomon: "I am about to die. Be strong and show yourself a man (Esto Vir) and keep the charge of the Lord, your God walking in His ways and keeping His statutes and commandments so that you may prosper in all you do." Later the meaning of Esto Vir was changed to "Be human".

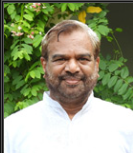
A Picture Of Current Rector Fr. Augustine Perumalil S. J.

== Rectors ==
- Fr. Frank Loesh, S.J. (21 April 1960 – 11 December 1965)
- Fr. Edward Mann, S.J. (12 December 1965 – 21 July 1968)
- Fr. Gerald Grace, S.J. (22 July 1968 – 24 June 1972)
- Fr. Thomas Athazaphadam, S.J. (25 June 1972 – 17 September 1978)
- Fr. Joseph Paschal, S.J. (18 September 1978 – 21 April 1984)
- Fr. K.T. Thomas, S.J. (22 April 1984 – 20 March 1991)
- Fr. Mathew Padayatty, S.J. (21 March 1991 – 20 March 1997)
- Fr. Thomas Kuriacose, S.J. (10 July 1997 – 2003)
- Fr. Sebastian Assarikudy, S.J. (2003–2006)
- Fr. P.T. Augustine, S.J. (2006–2015)
- Fr. Jose Philip, S.J. (2015–2021)
- Fr. Augustine Perumalil S. J. (2021 onwards)

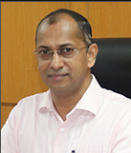
A Picture Of Current Principal Fr. Sobin K. Thomas, S.J.

== Principals ==
- Fr. Charles Saldhana, S.J. (January 1960 - July 1960)
- Fr. Thomas Athazaphadam, S.J. (July 1960 – 17 December 1961)
- Fr. Thomas Kunnunkal, S.J. (18 December 1961 – 31 May 1971), (1 September 1977 – 31 March 1979)
- Fr. Abraham Puthumana, S.J. (1 August 1974 – 31 August 1977)
- Mr. Augustus Martins (1 April 1979 – 31 March 1980)
- Fr. Joseph Parakatt, S.J. (1 April 1980 – 31 March 1985)
- Br. Ittoop Pallipadan, S.J. (1 April 1985 – 1 December 1992)
- Fr. John Ariapilly, S.J. (2 December 1992 – 9 July 1997)
- Fr. P.T. Augustine, S.J. (10 July 1997 – April 2001)
- fr. Xavier J. Ignatius, S.J. (April 2001 – March 2005)
- Fr. Jose Mourinho, S.J. (April 2005 – May 2010)
- Fr. Jose Jacob, S.J. (July 2010 – 2015)
- Fr. TJ Jose, S.J. (2015–2025)
- Fr. Sobin K. Thomas S.J (2025 onwards)

== Alumni ==
=== Delhi Old Xavierian's Association ===
The Delhi Old Xaverian's Association (DOXA), formerly Xaviers Old Boys Association Delhi, is the official alumni association with over 7,000 members, spanning across all batches that have graduated since 1966.

Nearly two hundred students join DOXA's ranks each year. Membership makes it easier to keep in touch with school and school-time friends. It also entitles participation in the activities of DOXA including the Annual Dinner, Annual Ball, Annual General Body Meeting, seminars, and conferences in India and abroad.

=== Notable alumni ===
- Nuruddin Ahmed – barrister and Padma Bhushan recipient
- Ashok Alexander – CEO of Avahan & Bill & Melinda Gates Foundation, India
- Samir Arora – founder and CEO of Mode Media
- Raghav Bahl – former Chairman and MD of TV 18
- Shakun Batra – actor and director
- Lt. Gen. Philip Campose – Vice Chief of Army Staff of the Indian Army
- Upamanyu Chatterjee – Indian Administrative Service official and author
- Mohit Chauhan – singer
- Dinesh Dhamija – politician and Member of Parliament for the European Union
- Arun Jaitley – Union Cabinet Minister
- Archana Kavi – actress
- Aman Lekhi – Additional Solicitor General of India
- Ajay Maken – former Housing and Poverty Alleviation Minister of India
- Ajai Malhotra – senior Indian Foreign Service diplomat and former Ambassador to the Russian Federation
- Harish Manwani – COO of Unilever
- Pinaki Misra – politician and Member of Parliament for Puri, representing the Biju Janata Dal
- Sudhanshu Mittal – politician and member of Bharatiya Janata Party
- Rahul Ram – guitarist for Indian Ocean, music composer, and social activist
- Susmit Sen – guitarist and founder of Indian Ocean
- Dinesh Singh – a professor of mathematics who served as a former vice-chancellor of the University of Delhi
- Shaurya Singh – director and actor
- Sameer Soni – actor
- Gopal Subramaniam – former Solicitor General of India
- Sameer Suneja – CEO of Perfetti Van Melle
- Pavan Varma – politician and member of Janata Dal
- Alok Verma – Senior Indian Police Service officer and Director of the Central Bureau of Investigation
- Param Vir – musician
- Tahir Qureshi - Senior journalist and media personality (Jagran, Indian Express, DD, MTIL, Zee, etc.)

== See also ==
- List of Jesuit schools
- List of schools in India
- Violence against Christians in India
