= Ellen Gottschalk Roy =

German-Jewish radical and writer (1904–1960)

Ellen Gottschalk Roy (15 August 1904 – 13 December 1960) was a German-Jewish radical, writer, editor, and close collaborator with Indian revolutionary M. N. Roy. Following his death, she took on the editorship of the Radical Humanist, which espoused their shared philosophy. She was a co-architect of Radical Humanism. She was a significant humanist leader in India.

== Life ==
Ellen Gottschalk was born in Paris in 1904 to Oscar Gottschalk, a diplomat, and his wife Edele (née Frizler). She attended school in Cologne, where she excelled in music and singing. The First World War mobilised Gottschalk against 'the absurdity of hostile patriotisms', and the militarism which accompanied them. She became involved in radical politics, and joined the German Communist Party in 1927.

Gottschalk first met M. N. Roy in 1928. The pair exchanged letters during his imprisonment ('on charges of conspiracy to overthrow the state') between 1931 and 1936, during which time Gottschalk fled Berlin for Paris, escaping Nazi rule. These were published as Letters from Jail in 1943, and have been described as 'a document of revolutionary intimacy'. During his imprisonment, Ellen organised an 'international letter-writing campaign' which demanded the release of Roy, to which Jawaharlal Nehru and Fenner Brockway contributed.

Roy was released from prison in 1936, and the following year Gottschalk moved to India and settled in Dehradun with him. They married in March 1937. Together, they organised the Radical Humanist group during the 1940s, and she continued to run it following his death in 1954. The importance of her support and collaboration to her husband's achievements has been widely acknowledged, with biographers noting that the 'voluminous writing that Roy did would not have been possible without Ellen.' Several studies posit her as a co-founder of the movement. She took an active role in the humanist movement, and saw her internationalism as arising in part from her upbringing, as well as from her socialism:

When you are born in one country and your mother belongs to another, and your father to a third, and endowed with his citizenship, you are a foreigner in every country where you have grown up and studied and... lived and worked, and yet you feel at home in all of them; if you then marry an alien from a different continent... and become at home there too... you see the good and bad in all countries and peoples.

Ellen Roy wrote Radical Democracy and, with Sibnarayan Ray, In Man's Own Image.

== Murder ==
Roy was found murdered in her home on 14 December 1960, at the age of 56. With no signs of robbery, it was speculated that there might have been political motivations. Her murder was later attributed to a local man who had been known to both Ellen and M. N. Roy.
