= Nuruddin Ahmed =

Indian lawyer and politician

- Born: 1904; Delhi, India
- Died: 1975 (aged 70-71); Delhi, India
- Resting place: Delhi, India
- Occupations: Lawyer; Mayor
- Known for: Legal practice Barrister; Mayor of Delhi
- Spouse: Bilqees Ahmed
- Children: Saleema Ahmed, Ameena Abuja, Farid Ahmed, Feroz Ahmed
- Parent(s): Mushtaq Ahmed and Husn Afroz Zahidie siblings                  Husna Haqqi,  Asif A Zahidie Lawyer(Aligarh)
- Awards: Padma Bhushan

Nuruddin Ahmed (1904 – 1975) was an Indian lawyer and three-time mayor of Delhi. Born in 1904 in Delhi in a wealthy family to Principal Mushtaq Ahmed Zahidie, of Sadiq Eggerton College, Bhawalpur, India. He did his early education at St. Xavier's School, Delhi and completed his pre-graduate studies from St. Stephen's College. Subsequently, he did Classical Tripos from Cambridge University before studying law at the Inner Temple from where he was called to the bar. Returning to India, he started his career as a junior to Muhammad Shafi where Fakhruddin Ali Ahmed, who would later become the fifth president of India, was his colleague, and started practice at Lahore High Court. Then, he went to Delhi to continue his practice and became known for his prowess in criminal trials. He was also involved in civic administration and during his four terms as a member of the Delhi Corporation, he served as the mayor of Delhi for three terms, from 1960 to 1965. The Government of India awarded him the third highest civilian honour of the Padma Bhushan, in 1964, for his contributions to public affairs. Ameena Ahmad Ahuja, a noted artist, was his daughter. Ahmed died in 1975, at the age of 71.
