= Reason, Romanticism and Revolution =

Book by M. N. Roy

- Dust jacket of the Indian first edition of Volume Two of Reason, Romanticism and Revolution, published posthumously in 1955
- Author: M. N. Roy
- Publication date: 1952

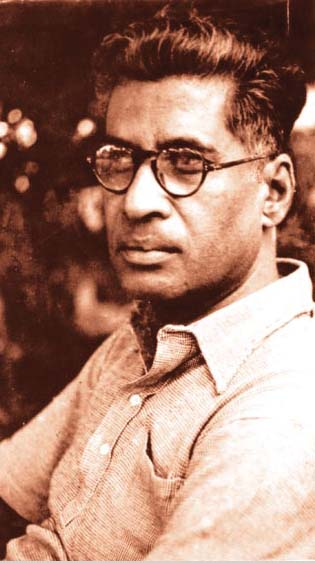
Philosopher and political activist M.N. Roy (1887–1954), author of Reason, Romanticism and Revolution

Reason, Romanticism and Revolution is the last major work by Indian humanist philosopher and political activist M. N. Roy. Deemed by some to be his "magnum opus," the book was published in two volumes, with the final manuscript readied for the press in the spring of 1952.

The first volume appeared in August 1952 with the second volume published posthumously in May 1955. The work is a survey of the development of Western political thought as reflected through the prism of Roy's philosophical ideas and includes a presentation of his own original thinking about "New Humanism".

== History ==
=== Background ===
Indian political philosopher M. N. Roy began work on what would be his final major project, Reason, Romanticism and Revolution, in 1948. Roy's process of research, writing, and revision would continue for nearly half a decade, with the final typescript prepared for the press in April 1952.

In introducing his work, Roy asserted that modern civilization faced a "cultural and moral crisis" that compelled thoughtful people to seek a return to society's "humanist tradition". Roy attributed this crisis to a negative byproduct of the 19th Century victory of skepticism and empiricism over other more immutable and deterministic belief systems — a process which not only "set human spirit free" but which also ushered in new forms of subjugation. "If empiricism deposed reason from the seat of the supreme judge, pragmatism subordinated moral values to practical considerations," Roy declared.

Reason, Romanticism and Revolution was in some ways an extension of an argument begun by Roy in his 1946 book, Beyond Communism to Humanism, in which the centralism and deterministic economic basis of Marxism was rejected as well as the atomized society associated with individualism, in favor of a loosely structured "radical democracy" of self-governing local units which administered society at a local level, coordinating a cooperative economy.

Attempting to move past Marxism, Roy presented his book as a grand "humanist interpretation of cultural history" which also sought to "outline a comprehensive philosophy which links up social and political practice with a scientific metaphysics of rationality and ethics."

=== Structure ===
Roy's book attempted to systematically review the development of Western political philosophy from the birth of modern thought through the Age of Enlightenment, the emergence of 19th Century Romanticism and Liberalism as a reforming ethos, as well as the Marxist response. Roy perceived Marxism at an impasse and posited his own theory of a "New Humanism" as an alternative to what he characterized as the "Crisis of the Twentieth Century".

Volume One (1952)

Chapter 1: Introduction
Chapter 2: Human Nature
Chapter 3: The Law-Governed Universe
Chapter 4: The Revolt of Man
Chapter 5: Revolt of the Angels
Chapter 6: The Natural Law
Chapter 7: Birth of Modern Philosophy
Chapter 8: The New Science
Chapter 9: The Enlightenment
Chapter 10: The Great Revolution—I
Chapter 11: The Great Revolution—II

Volume Two (1955)

Chapter 1: Reaction and Romanticism
Chapter 2: History of Romanticism
Chapter 3: Romantic Extravagance
Chapter 4: Liberalism: Origin and Tradition
Chapter 5: Fallacies of Liberalism
Chapter 6: Utilitarianism
Chapter 7: Neo-Classical Rationalism
Chapter 8: Hegel to Marx
Chapter 9: Marxism
Chapter 10: The Twins of Irrationalism
Chapter 11: The Crisis of the Twentieth Century
Chapter 12: The Way Out
Chapter 13: New Humanism

=== Critical response ===
Reason, Romanticism and Revolution proved to be Roy's best-known work, generating critical attention in European intellectual circles during the decade of the 1950s. Roy's work was lauded as "thorough" and "brilliant" by philosopher Erich Fromm in his 1955 book, The Sane Society.
