= Sameer Suneja =

Indian executive

- Education: St. Xavier's Senior Secondary School, Delhi
- Alma mater: Indian Institute of Management Bangalore
- Occupation: Business executive
- Title: Global CEO of Perfetti Van Melle

Sameer Suneja is an Indian executive who is the current global CEO of confectionery manufacturer Perfetti Van Melle. He is the first non-Italian to head the third largest confectionery group in the world.

== Biography ==
Suneja went to St. Xavier's Senior Secondary School, Delhi and graduated in 1989. He completed his masters from Indian Institute of Management Bangalore in 1994.

Suneja joined Colgate Palmolive as a brand manager in June 1994. He left Palmolive in January 1996 to join Frito Lay, where he worked for a little over a year. He joined Perfetti Van Melle in February 1997. He was promoted to the role of executive vice-president for global innovations and business development in August 2012. Later, he was appointed global CEO in August 2013.
