= Ameena Ahmad Ahuja =

Indian painter, calligrapher, writer and linguist

- Born: India
- Education: Slade School of Art
- Occupations: Painter; Calligrapher; Linguist; Writer
- Known for: Calligraphic paintings
- Spouse: Vishnu Ahuja
- Parent: Nuruddin Ahmed
- Awards: Padma Shri
- Website: Website

Ameena Ahmad Ahuja is an Indian painter, calligrapher, writer and linguist, known for her Urdu poetry-inspired artworks. She received the fourth highest civilian honour of India, the Padma Shri, in 2009 by the Government of india.

== Biography ==
Ameena Ahmad Ahuja was born to a British mother and Nuruddin Ahmed, a barrister and litterateur. She did her training in art at the Slade School of Art in London. She is a former member of faculty of the Department of Russian at the Jawaharlal Nehru University (JNU) and, besides Russian, she is proficient in languages such as Persian, German, French, Hindi and English. Her career also covered stints at Columbia University as a lecturer of poetry and as an Artist-in-residence at the Harvard University and her exhibitions have been staged at many places in India and abroad including Moscow, Tokyo, Venezuela, Columbia and New York. She has served as the official translator during the visits of Soviet dignitaries including Alexei Kosygin, Nikolai Bulganin, Nikita Khrushchev and Leonid Brezhnev to India.

She was married to Vishnu Ahuja, a diplomat and former ambassador to the USSR and had opportunities to visit many countries, accompanying her husband, who has since died.

== Publications ==
She is the author of the book, Calligraphy in Islam, a text in Urdu, published 2009 by Penguin India.

== Awards and honours ==
The Government of India awarded her the fourth highest civilian honour of the Padma Shri, in 2009, for her contributions to Arts.
