= Jerome D'Souza =

Indian Jesuit priest (1897–1977)

Jerome D'Souza, SJ (6 August 1897 – 12 August 1977) was an Indian Jesuit priest, educationist, writer and member of the Indian Constituent assembly (1946–50).

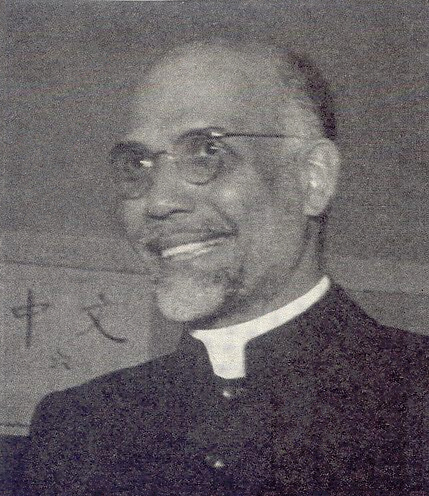
Jerome D'Souza

== Early years and formation ==
Born in the Moolki town of Mangalore in the erstwhile South Canara district of British India, to a Catholic family cultivating intellectual interest, Jerome was soon at home in several local languages. He did his secondary schooling at St. Aloysius College (Mangalore) and college studies in St. Joseph's College (Tiruchirapalli, Tamil Nadu, India). Completing finally the English Literature course at the University of Madras (Chennai) he first taught a year at St Joseph's College, Trichy, before deciding to enter the Society of Jesus (29 May 1921).

He then went through the usual Jesuit training, doing his theological studies with the French Jesuits in Belgium at the end of which he was ordained priest on 30 August 1931 (Enghien, Belgium). He hailed from the Mangalorean Catholic community.

== Educationist in Tamil Nadu ==
Back in India in 1933, he was appointed professor in his alma mater, the St Joseph's College of Trichy of which he became within a few years, rector and president. An able administrator, Jerome was also a convincing orator. He soon attracted the attention of Sir C. Rajagopalachari (known as Rajaji), the then president of the Indian National Congress. Transferred in 1942 to the Loyola College of Chennai (formerly Madras), to be its rector and later its Principal, D'Souza soon became involved in the legal establishment of the University of Madras (Chennai). When the time came to form an assembly that would draw a constitution for the country—the independence of India was near—D'Souza's name was proposed by Rajagopalachari to the Madras legislative assembly. He was elected to represent them at the constituent assembly of Delhi.

== Member of the Indian Constituent Assembly ==
At the assembly (1946 to 1950), along with the Protestant leader H.C. Mukherjee, D'Souza ensured the rights of the minorities (especially of worship and education) were fully protected by the proposed text and the right to practice and propagate one's religion were included in the constitution as fundamental rights of all citizens of India.

== Statesman and diplomat ==
In Delhi he soon gained the trust and admiration of Jawaharlal Nehru, the first prime minister of independent India who often consulted him in educational matters and used his oratorical skill. At the instance of Nehru he was also involved in delicate diplomatic negotiations:

- He negotiated with the Vatican the termination of the Portuguese Padroado system that was giving to Portugal an undue say in the appointment of bishops in India.
- He was involved in the negotiations with the French government leading ultimately to a peaceful transfer of the French colonial settlements (Chandannagar, Pondicherry, etc.) to the new Independent India.
- On four occasions D'Souza was member of the Indian delegation to the UNO's yearly general session.
- His command of French, Spanish, Italian and German languages, besides English opened him many doors and he was often invited to give talks and lectures on Indian culture, history and politics, in various parts of the world.

== Indian Social Institute ==
At the request of the Superior General of the Society of Jesus, D'Souza founded in Pune (India) the Indian Social Institute (now in New-Delhi, 10, Institutional Area, Lodhi Road New Delhi), and started publishing a journal Social Action in 1951 that has nowadays is a large circulation in social and academic circles. He became its first Director (1951–1956). Later, in 1957, D'Souza was made the Assistant and adviser of the Superior General of the Jesuits (Jean-Baptiste Janssens) for Indian and Asian affairs. He returned to India in 1968 and spent his last years writing articles and books, giving lectures and courses. He died in Madras in 1977. Jerome D'Souza was one of the best known Jesuits of his times. Still many gratefully visit his tomb at Christ the King Church, in Loyola College, Chennai campus.

== Recognition ==
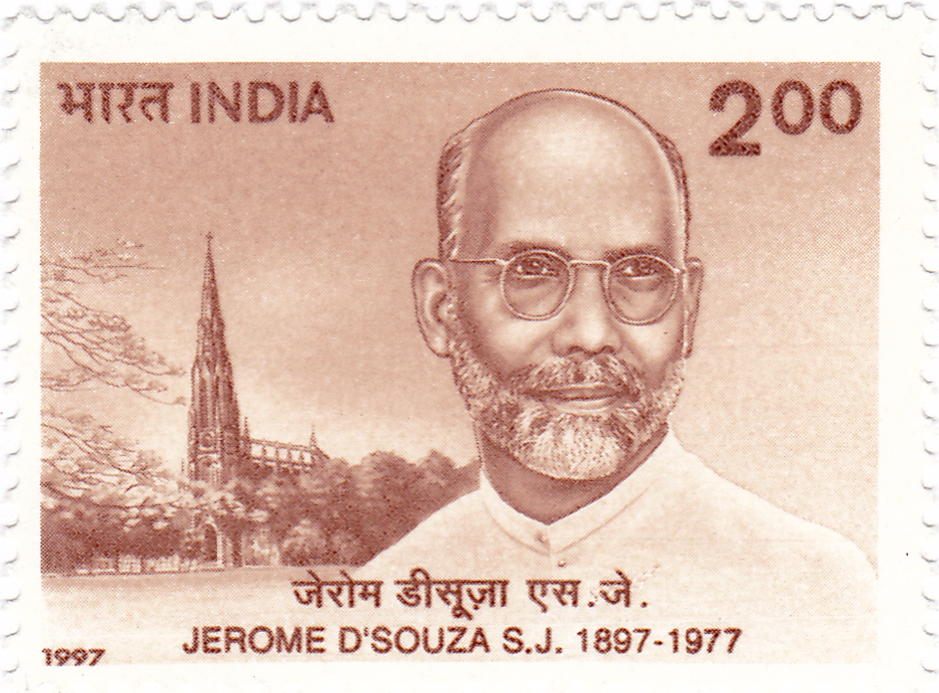
D'Souza on a 1997 stamp of India

In 1997, the Indian government issued a stamp to commemorate his birth centenary.

== Writings ==
- Sardar Panikkar and the Christian Missions, Tiruchi, 1957.
- The Church and Civilization, Garden City, 1967
- Speeches and Writings, Madras, 1972.

== Bibliography ==
- SUNDARAM, V.L.: A great Indian Jesuit, Anand, 1986.
