= Sibnarayan Ray =

Indian thinker, philosopher and literary critic (1921–2008)

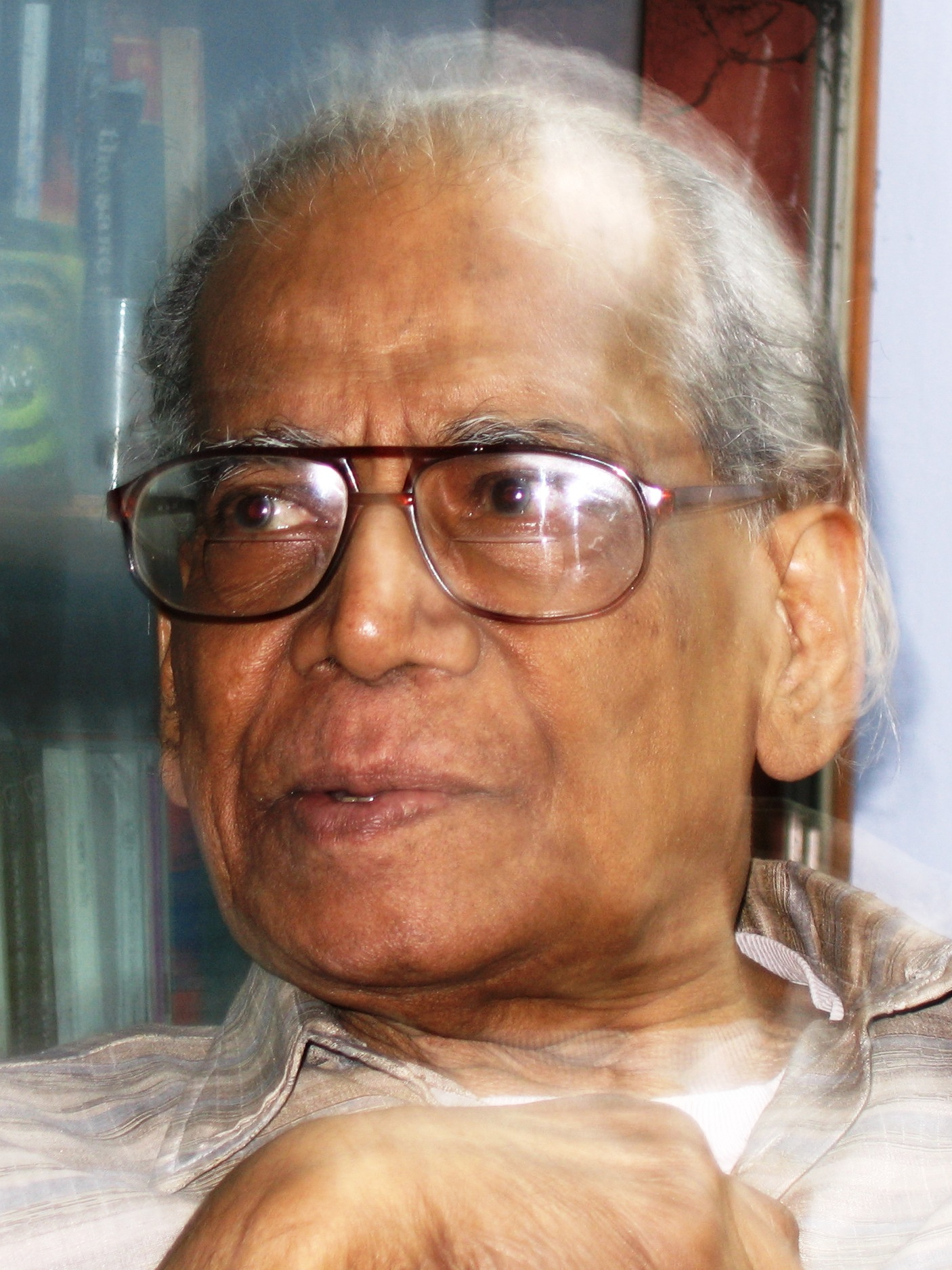
- Sibnarayan Ray in 2006
- Born: 20 January 1921; Calcutta, British India
- Died: 26 February 2008 (aged 87); Shantiniketan, India
- Education: University of Calcutta (BA in English literature)
- Occupations: Thinker; educationist; philosopher; literary critic
- Spouse: Gita Ray
- Awards: Regina Guha Gold Medal (1942)

Sibnarayan Ray (20 January 1921 – 26 February 2008) was an Indian thinker, educationist, philosopher, and literary critic who wrote in the Bengali language. A radical humanist, he is widely reputed for his works on Marxist-revolutionary Manabendra Nath Roy, and famous polymath Bertrand Russell, commenting on Ray, once said that "... Sibnarayan Ray stands for a point of view which I consider important in every part of the world. ... His writings ably represents a more reasonable point of view than that of most writers of our time."

== Life and career ==
On 20 January 1921, Sibnarayan Ray was born to Upendranath Bidyabhushan Shastri (1867–1959) and poet Rajkumari Roy (1882–1973) in Calcutta, India. His father was a thinker-writer who had published more than 50 books in Sanskrit and English. His mother, too, was a literary person who regularly contributed to magazines like Bamabodhini, Shibam, Antapur, and Mahila. Sibnarayan started writing in his teens. He graduated from the University of Calcutta with a degree in English language and literature. He was married to Gita Ray.

He joined the City College, Calcutta, a constituent undergraduate college of the University of Calcutta, in 1945 at the age of twenty four as a lecturer in English literature. He taught there for fifteen years. He was head of the Department of Indian Studies at the University of Melbourne from 1962 until late 1980.

Ray taught at many universities around the world as a visiting professor, including the School of Oriental and African Studies (SOAS) under the University of London and the Department of Social Science at the University of Chicago. He was invited to deliver lectures at many universities in Malaysia, Norway, England, Germany, and the US. As a visiting professor, he taught courses at Clare College of Cambridge University, Goethe University in Frankfurt, and Stanford University.

After returning to Calcutta from Melbourne, he worked as director of the Rabindra Bhavan at Visva-Bharati University from 1981 to 1983. He was an emeritus fellow on Literature of the Department of Culture, Government of India and worked as the Chairman of the Raja Rammohan Roy. He was also a senior research fellow at the Indian Council of Historical Research. Notably, he worked as the executive secretary of the Indian Renaissance Institute (IRI) from 1960 to 1969.

He died in Shantiniketan on 26 February 2008. Following his wishes, his mortal remains were donated to the SSKM Hospital in Calcutta.

== A radical humanist ==
Ray was imbued with the spirit of communism in early life. However, the realities of Stalinist rule in the USSR frustrated him. That led him to believe in the sublimity of humankind and made him aware of the constraints of human freedom that are inherent in man's own cognition. For his philosophical thinking, he came to be known as a radical humanist. However, Sibnarayan Ray was profoundly influenced by the concept styled "Beyond Communism", propounded by M. N. Roy. The concept of radical humanism was conceived by M. N. Roy in his Basic principles of Radical Democracy, which he shared with a few comrades, including Sibnarayan Ray. One of the assumptions was that party-politics was inconsistent with his ideal of organised democracy. It was 'radical' because it rejected many of the traditional political and philosophical assumptions underlying the society of early twentieth century India; and it was 'humanism' because it focused entirely on the needs and situation of human beings. Young Sibnarayan took part in the Radical Humanist Movement launched by M. N. Roy in 1948. He edited the Radical Humanist Weekly.

Notably, unlike some humanists, radical humanists aim to overthrow or transcend existing social arrangements. Radical humanists seek transformation, emancipation, and critical analysis of modes of domination. They want people to reconstruct their view of reality and take appropriate action. Ray said that it was not just religion, but politics that could stifle free-thinking and the spirit of inquiry. The human mind has a conflict in itself. It will either give in to an authority or ask questions. He believed that in order for a society to thrive, it should follow the latter path. However, Ray believed that today, both rationality and the questioning spirit are on the wane.

== Literary criticism ==
Sibnarayan Ray was highly respected for his literary criticism.

== Publication of Jijnasa ==
He published and edited Jijnasa (pronounced jiggāsā in Bengali Bengali: জিজ্ঞাসা). This became the most important Bengali journal of literature, history, culture, and philosophy. Writers from home and abroad contributed to this Bengali-language journal published from Calcutta. Ray undertook to edit and publish Jijnasa in 1980 while he was still residing in Melbourne.

== Works on M. N. Roy ==
Indian revolutionary communist M. N. Roy was one of the pioneering leaders of the revolutionary movements in India, Mexico, the Soviet Union, and China. He took a leading role in founding the Communist Party of Mexico (1919) and of India (1920). During the 1920s, he rose to the highest echelon of the Communist International hierarchy by becoming a member of the executive committee, the Presidium, and the Political Secretariat. More importantly, he was reputed to be an unparalleled theorist with incisive and analytical writings. Sibnarayan Ray first met M. N. Roy in 1946. He was greatly influenced by the thinking of this revolutionary. Before his death he was writing a biography of Manabendra Nath Roy. He edited the works of Roy in four volumes, which have been published by the Oxford University Press.

== Poetry ==
Sibnarayan Ray composed some poems in his early years of writing. Most of them were collected in an anthology under the title Kothara Tomar Mon, published in 1951. A second edition of the anthology was published in the late 1990s. One of these poems, rendered into English from Bengali by Evelyn Panofsky, is quoted below:

This Rare Afternoon
This rare afternoon in the valley of autumn.
Behind the trembling curtain of pine needles
sad sun's gold. On chestnut branches
scant whorls of mauve-tinted flowers.

Drowsy peace falling,
pine needles falling,
touch of elderly sadness in the valley of autumn.

No dark monsoon flashes of passion's anguish
are in this autumn's serene and elderly sadness.

Afternoon of falling needles. Look, there falls
a dew drop and glides down the curved belly of time.

== Quotations ==
- In the whole world, it is only Goethe who compares with Rabindranath Tagore in terms of literary diversity.
- If Bengali as a language has any chance to flourish, that will be in Bangladesh and not in West Bengal.

== Publications ==
Cover of Kobir Nirbashon O Onyanya Bhabona published in 1973

Ray has more than fifty titles to his credit, including one book of poetry, starting with Prekshita, his first book published in 1945. His works have been translated into many languages. Some of the titles are given below :

- Prekshita (tr. Perspectives)(Its focus was the decadence of modern English literature.)
- Moumachi-tantra
- Sahitya Chinta (tr. Thoughts on Literature), 1956.
- Kothara Tomar Mon (poetry)
- M. N. Roy Philosopher-Revolutionary, edited by Sibnarayan Ray, Calcutta, 1959.
- Nayoker Mrityu (tr. Death of the Hero), 1960.
- Probasher Journal (tr. Journal written while abroad)
- Radicalism
- I have seen Bengal's Face (ed.) 1973.
- Gandhi, India and the World (edited)
- Kobir Nirbashon O Onanyana Bhawna (tr. Expulsion of the Poet and Other Issues), 1973.
- In quest of freedom - A study of the life and works of M. N. Roy
- Between Renaissance and Revolution: Selected Essays
- From the Broken Nest to Visva-Bharati
- Khraiyer dike (tr. Uphill route), 1988.
- A New Renaissance.
- Swadesh, Swakal, Swajan (tr. Own land, Own time, Own people), 1996.
- Selected Works of M.N.Roy: Vol:4. 1932–1936, by Sibnarayan Ray
- Bengal Renaissance: The First Phase
- The University of Man: The Message of Romain Rolland
- Vietnam Seen from East and West
- In Man's Own Image (co-author Ellen Roy)

=== Essays ===
- "Ideologies and the Alienated Writer" in Society and the Writer: Essays on Literature in Modern Asia, edited by Wang Gungwu, M. Guerrero, and D. Marr, pp. 221–37. Canberra: Research School of Pacific Studies, The Australian National University, 1981.
- "A literary revolution in India", Times Literaray Supplement, August 1957.
- "Decline of the Indian Intellectuals", Quest, Octo–Dec 1958.
- "Eastwind Westwind", Soviet Survey, April–June 1959.
- "Saratchandra Chottopadhya", The Radical Humanist, 22 June 1952.
- "Ezra Pound and the Artists's Dilemma", The Radical Humanist, September 1952.
- "Ezra Pound", The Calcutta Review, May 1943.
- "Albert Camus", Quest, April–June 1960.
- The Sikh Movement, in A New Renaissance.
- "Shakespearian Variations on the Theme of Apartheid" by Sibnarayan Ray, in Calcutta Essays on Shakespeare, Ed. Amalendu Bose.

== Awards and recognition ==
- 1942 Regina Guha Gold Medal, Calcutta University.
- Bertrand Russell commented that

... Sibnarayan Ray stands for a point of view which I consider important in every part of the world. ... His writings ably represents a more reasonable point of view than that of most writers of our time.

- Poet Edith Sitwell said

It is my convinced opinion that Sibnarayan Ray is one of the few really important critics of our time. ... In this most remarkable book Explorations, doors are opened upon long vistas of beauty and of meaning. There is a nourishment for the mind and for the power of living upon every page....
