= Harish Manwani =

Indian businessman

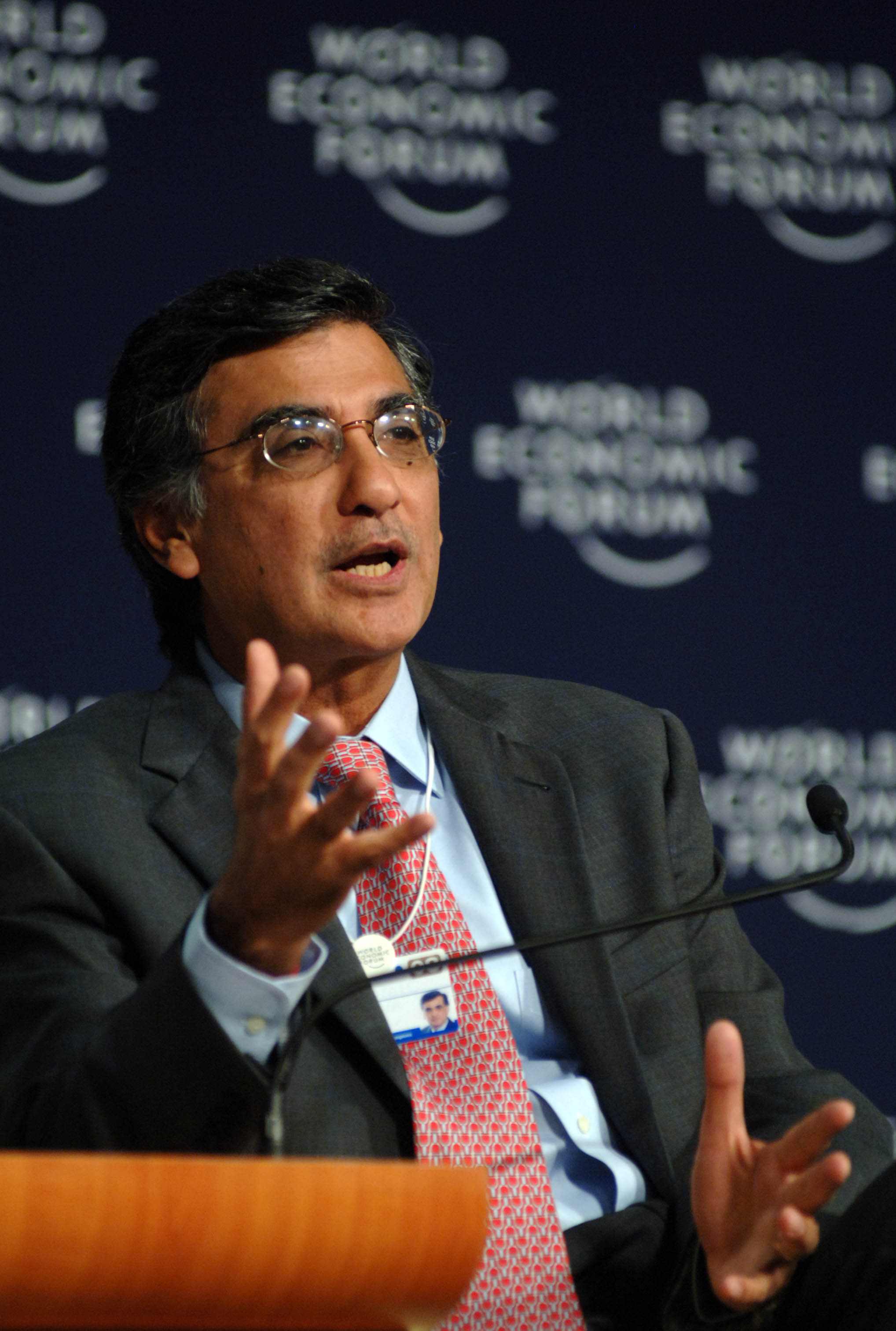
- Harish Manwani, COO of Unilever
- Born: 1953 (age 72–73); India
- Citizenship: Indian
- Education: Jamnalal Bajaj Institute of Management Studies
- Occupation: Director
- Spouse: Radha Manwani
- Children: 2

Harish Manwani (born 1953) is an Indian business executive who was the global chief operating officer of Unilever. He is a senior operating partner at Blackstone since 2015 and a director of Whirlpool, Qualcomm, Gilead Sciences and Tata Sons among others.

== Early life ==
Manwani went to St. Xavier's School, Delhi and graduated from Mumbai University. He obtained a master's degree in management studies at Jamnalal Bajaj Institute of Management Studies.

== Career ==
In 1976, Manwani joined Unilever in India (Hindustan Lever Limited). He became a member of the company board with responsibility for the Personal Products Division. He also held regional responsibility for personal products in Central Asia and the Middle East.

In 2000, he moved to Unilever headquarters in the UK as the senior vice president of global hair care and oral care and subsequently held several senior general management positions with P&L responsibilities including president of home and personal care for Latin America, president and CEO of Unilever HPC North America, president Asia, Africa, Middle East, and Central and Eastern Europe. He was made a non-executive chairman of Hindustan Unilever in 2005.

In 2011, he was appointed the global COO for Unilever, with P&L responsibility for all the markets. He retired on 31 December 2014, after more than 38 years.

He is, since 2015, a senior operating partner at Blackstone and is on several international boards, and is also chairman of the Indian School of Business.

== Awards ==
The Asia Business Leader of the Year in 2008 by CNBC Asia.

== Personal life ==
Harish is married and has two daughters.

He was one of the hostages who were trapped in Taj Hotel in Mumbai during the 2008 Mumbai attacks.
