= M. N. Roy =

Indian revolutionary and political theorist (1887–1954)

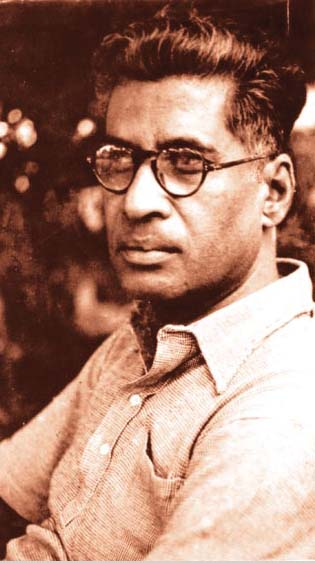
- M. N. Roy
- Born: Narendra Nath Bhattacharya; 21 March 1887; Arbelia, Bengal Presidency, British India (present-day West Bengal, India)
- Died: 25 January 1954 (aged 66); Dehradun, Uttar Pradesh, India
- Education: Jadavpur University, Communist University of the Toilers of the East
- Occupations: Revolutionary, radical activist, political theorist, philosopher
- Political party: Jugantar, Communist Party of India, Mexican Communist Party, Radical Democratic Party
- Movement: Indian Independence movement, Indian revolutionary movement, Hindu–German Conspiracy

Manabendra Nath Roy (born Narendra Nath Bhattacharya, better known as M. N. Roy; 21 March 1887 – 25 January 1954) was a 20th-century Indian revolutionary, philosopher, radical activist and political theorist. Roy was the founder of the Mexican Communist Party and the Communist Party of India (Tashkent group).

He was also a delegate to the Communist International congresses and Russia's aide to China. In the aftermath of World War II Roy moved away from orthodox Marxism to espouse the philosophy of radical humanism, attempting to chart a third course between liberalism and communism.

== Early life (1887–1910s) ==
=== Early years ===
Narendra Nath "Naren" Bhattacharya was born on 21 March 1887 in Arbelia, North 24 Parganas, West Bengal, near Calcutta (Kolkata).

The Bhattacharyas were Sakta Brahmins – a family of hereditary priests. Roy's paternal grandfather was the head priest of the goddess Kheputeswari in the village of Kheput, Midnapore district. His father Dinabandhu Bhattacharya also served as a priest before moving to the village of Arbelia with his 12 children.

Following the death of his first wife, Roy's father married Basantakumari Devi, the niece of Dwarkanath Vidyabhushan. He then taught Sanskrit at a nearby school. The couple had a total of eight children, including the fourth-born Naren.

Roy's early schooling took place at Arbelia. In 1898, the family moved to Kodalia and he continued his studies at the Harinavi Anglo-Sanskrit School, where his father taught, until 1905. He was considered tall, strong and athletic for his age.

He later enrolled at the National College under the tutelage of Sri Aurobindo, before studying at Bengal Technical Institute (now Jadavpur University) where he studied engineering and chemistry. However, much of Roy's knowledge was gained through self-study.

=== Indian independence movement ===
Towards the end of the 19th century, revolutionary nationalism began to spread among the educated middle classes of Bengal, inspired by the writings of Bankim and Vivekananda.

According to one biographer, Roy agreed with Bankim that true religion was not being cloistered from the world, but working actively for the public good. Vivekananda reinforced this and advanced the idea that Hinduism and Indian culture were superior to anything the Western world could offer.

He formed a rationalist group with his cousin Hari Kumar Chakravarti (1882–1963). Members included Satkori Banerjee (Bandhopadhyay), brothers Saileshvar and Shyamsundar Bose, Roy's cousins Phani and Narendra Chakravarti, and Mokshadacharan Samadhyayi, an organiser of the Anushilan Samiti in Chinsura.

In July 1905, the partition of Bengal was announced, scheduled to take effect in October. A mass movement aimed at annulling the partition emerged, giving radical nationalists like Roy an opportunity to build broader support. Following his high school expulsion for organising a meeting and a march against the partition, Roy and Chakravarti moved to Kolkata and joined the Anushilans.

Under Mokshada's leadership, on 6 December 1907 Roy committed political theft to raise money for the Anushilans. When arrested, he was carrying two seditious books by Barin Ghosh. Defended by J. N. Roy (close friend of Bagha Jatin) and Promothonath Mukherjee, he was released on bail, thanks to his reputation as a student and social worker.

Barin sent Prafulla Chaki with Charuchandra Datta to see Bagha Jatin at Darjeeling who was posted there on official duty, and do away with the Lt. Governor. On explaining to Prafulla that it was not the right time, Jatin promised to contact him later. Though Prafulla was impressed by him, Barin cynically commented that it would be too much effort for a government officer to serve a patriotic cause. Phani returned from Darjeeling and, fascinated by Jatin's charisma, he informed his friends about him. On hearing Barin censuring Phani for disloyalty, Roy decided to meet Dada but was caught by Barin.

The Howrah-Shibpur Trial (1910–11) brought Bhattacharya closer to Jatindra Mukherjee.

He also worked closely with Hemchandra Kanungo for a during his time in the Anushilan Samiti at Calcutta, he was inspired by Kanungo's travels in Europe, and he was also impressed by the advanced bomb manufacturing technologies that Hem had brought from Russia.

=== Hindu–German Conspiracy ===
Many Indian nationalists, including Roy, became convinced that only through a revolution would they be able to achieve India's independence from the British Empire. So revolutionary nationalists looked to a rival imperial power, that of Kaiser Wilhelm's Germany, as a potential source for funds and weapons.

In August 1914, World War I began, affecting both the UK and Germany. Expatriate Indian nationalists organised as the Indian Revolutionary Committee in Berlin made an informal appeal to the German government to support a revolution in India. Towards the end of the year, the Germans had agreed to provide funding and material to start an uprising against British rule. Revolution seemed near.

The task of attaining said funding and material was entrusted to Roy. He was sent to Java, then controlled by the Netherlands as part of the Dutch East Indies, where over the next two months Roy was only able to obtain little funding and no armaments.

In early 1915, Roy set out again, leaving India to search for the German armaments which were believed to be en route somewhere in the Pacific. Roy would not see his homeland again for 16 years.

The plan seemed fantastic, as Roy later recounted in his posthumously published memoirs:

"The plan was to use German ships interned in a port at the northern tip of Sumatra, to storm the Andaman Islands and free and arm the prisoners there, and land the army of liberation on the Orissa coast. The ships were armoured, as many big German vessels were, ready for wartime use. They also carried several guns each. The crew was composed of naval ratings. They had to escape from the internment camp, seize the ships, and sail.... Several hundred rifles and other small arms with an adequate supply of ammunition could be acquired through Chinese smugglers who would get then on board the ships."

Last minute however, the money failed to materialise and the German Consul General had seemingly vanished the day when he was to issue orders for the plan, Roy recalls.

Disgusted but still holding out hope, Roy left Indonesia for Japan, hoping to win Japanese support for their cause, despite Japan's nominal alliance with Great Britain. There he met with Chinese nationalist leader Sun Yat-sen, who had escaped to Japan following the failure of the July 1913 uprising in Nanking.

Sun Yat-sen refused to assist Roy in his task of organising an anti-British revolution in India, instead informing Roy that Japanese support would prove sufficient. His inability to assist was due to Hong Kong's status as a British colony, Sun's own base of operations. Efforts to raise money from the German Ambassador to China were likewise unsuccessful.

Roy's activities soon drew the attention of the Japanese secret police. When he learned he was going to be served formal notice to leave Japan, not wishing to be deported to Shanghai, Roy immediately left the country and arrived in Korea.

He tried to make his way to Peking (Beijing), but he was identified by the British authorities, who detained him. However, he was able to escape jail time due to the British Consul General's ill ease with holding a British subject indefinitely without formal charges.

Efforts to raise funds from the German consulate at Hankow resulted in a tentative agreement. However, this plan also failed due to the scale of the commitment, which had to be approved in Berlin according to Admiral Paul von Hintze. Roy decided to search for German funding from the German Ambassador in the United States, before heading to Germany. Employees of the German embassy were able to assist Roy in stowing away aboard a German-crewed American ship bound for San Francisco.

Although they knew he was on the ship, British colonial authorities stopping the vessel in international waters were unable to locate Roy hidden in a secret compartment. In an effort to throw the British off his trail, and in an effort to obtain more suitable accommodations for the long trans-Pacific voyage, Roy disembarked from Kobe, Japan.

In Kobe, he used a fake French-Indian passport previously obtained for him by the Germans in China. Posing as a seminary student bound for Paris, Roy obtained an American visa, bought a ticket, and sailed for San Francisco.

== Communist movement (1910s–1929) ==
During his stay in Palo Alto, a period of about two months, Roy met his future wife, Evelyn Leonora Trent (alias Shanthi Devi). The pair fell in love and journeyed together across the country to New York City.

It was in the New York City public library that Roy began to develop his interest in Marxism. His socialist transition owed much to Bankim Chandra Chatterjee's essays on communism and Vivekananda's message of serving the proletariat. Due to the presence of British spies, Roy fled to Mexico in July 1917 with Evelyn. German military authorities, on the spot, gave him large amounts of money.

Mexican president Venustiano Carranza and other liberal thinkers appreciated Roy's contributions to the El Pueblo newspaper. The Socialist Party he founded in December 1917 later became the Communist Party of Mexico in 1919, the first Communist Party outside Russia. The Roys lodged a penniless Mikhail Borodin under special circumstances. Due to Borodin's grateful reports, Moscow planned to invite Roy to the 2nd World Congress of the Communist International, held in Moscow during the summer of 1920.

A few weeks before the Congress, Vladimir Lenin warmly received Roy. At Lenin's behest, Roy formulated his own ideas supplemented from Lenin's Preliminary Draft Theses on the National and the Colonial Questions. Roy's writings on the colonial question were then discussed in the 2nd World Congress of the Communist International.

Roy's writings were published by the International Press Correspondence (Inprecor), the weekly bulletin of the Communist International. Roy served as a member of the Comintern's Presidium for eight years and at one stage was the Political Secretariat, the executive committee, and the World Congress.

Commissioned by Lenin to prepare the East—especially India—for revolution, Roy founded military and political schools in Tashkent. In October 1920, as he formed the Communist Party of India, he contacted his revolutionary colleagues who, at this time, were determining allegiances between Radicalism (Jugantar) and Mohandas K. Gandhi's novel programme.

Close to the Jugantar in spirit and action, C. R. Das inspired Roy's confidence. From Moscow, Roy published his major reflections, India in Transition, which were translated into other languages. In 1922, Roy's own journal, the Vanguard, was published. This was followed by The Future of Indian Politics (1926) and Revolution and Counter-revolution in China (1930), while he was moving between Germany and France.

Leading a Comintern delegation appointed by Joseph Stalin to develop an agrarian revolution in China, Roy reached Canton in February 1927. Despite fulfilling his mission, a disagreement between the CCP leaders and Borodin led to breakdown of communication. Roy returned to Moscow where Trotskyists and Zinovievists were fighting the Stalinists. Here he voted for Trotsky's expulsion from the executive committee of the Comintern.

Stalin refused to meet Roy and give him a hearing at the plenum in February 1928. Denied treatment for an infected ear, Roy escaped with Nikolai Bukharin's help, sparing himself from Stalin's anger. Shortly after Trotsky's deportation on 22 May 1928, Roy received permission to go abroad for medical treatment on board a Berlin-bound Deruluft plane. In December 1929, the Inprecor announced Roy's expulsion from the Comintern, almost simultaneously with Bukharin's fall from grace.

== In India (1930–1954) ==
Roy returned to India for the first time in December 1930. Upon reaching Bombay, Roy met with Jawaharlal Nehru and Subhas Bose, the former of whom recalled that despite significant political differences, "I was attracted to him by his remarkable intellectual capacity."

Roy's political activity in India proved to be brief as on 21 July 1931 he was arrested in Bombay on an arrest warrant issued in 1924. Roy was taken to Kanpur to face charges under Section 121-A of the Indian Penal Code which was "conspiring to deprive the King Emperor of his sovereignty in India."

No trial was held in open court; rather, the proceedings were conducted inside the jail in which Roy was held. Roy was allowed neither trial by jury nor defense witnesses, nor was he allowed to make a defense statement. Proceedings were conducted from 3 November 1931 until 9 January 1932 when Roy was sentenced to 12 years imprisonment.

Roy was taken to the Bareilly Central Jail, however he was able to smuggle out the defence statement which he was not allowed to present in court. This disallowed declaration was published in full by Roy's supporters in India as My Defence, and in abridged form in New York as I Accuse.

Roy was unapologetic for his views against British colonial rule, declaring:

The oppressed people and exploited classes are not obliged to respect the moral philosophy of the ruling power.... A despotic power is always overthrown by force. The force employed in this process is not criminal. On the contrary, precisely the guns carried by the army of the British government in India are instruments of crime. They become instruments of virtue when they are turned against the imperialist state.

Roy filed an appeal to the Allahabad High Court, but this was dismissed on 2 May 1933. Roy's sentence was, however, reduced from 12 to 6 years. Roy ultimately served 5 years and 4 months, sitting in five different jails. Dismal prison conditions took a severe toll on Roy's health, and he suffered lasting damage to his heart, kidneys, lungs, and digestive tract as a result of his time behind bars. Roy also lost several teeth, was frequently feverish, and suffered constant pain from a chronically infected inner ear.

Despite his imprisonment, Roy still managed to contribute to the Indian independence movement. A steady stream of letters and articles were smuggled out of jail. He also wrote a 3,000-page draft manuscript provisionally titled The Philosophical Consequence of Modern Science. His followers, including A. A. Alwe, formed the Bombay Provincial Working Class Party in 1933 to continue his work while he was imprisoned.

Released in November 1936 in bad health, Roy went to Allahabad for recovery. Defying the Comintern order to boycott the Indian National Congress, Roy urged Indian communists to join this Party. Jawaharlal Nehru, in his address at the Faizpur session in December 1936, described Roy as:

...one who, though young, is an old and well-tried soldier in India's fight for freedom. Comrade M.N. Roy has just come to us after a long and most distressing period in prison, but though shaken up in body, he comes with a fresh mind and heart, eager to take part in that old struggle that knows no end till it ends in success.

From the podium, Roy in his speech recommended the capture of power by Constituent Assembly. Unable to collaborate with Gandhi, however, Roy stuck to his own conviction. In April 1937, his weekly Independent India appeared and was welcomed by progressive leaders like Bose and Nehru, however was criticised by Gandhi and the staunch Communists who accused Roy of deviation.

== Personal life and Radical Humanism ==
In marrying Ellen Gottschalk, his second wife, "Roy found not only a loving wife but also an intelligent helper and close collaborator." They settled in Dehra Dun. Roy proposed an alternative leadership, seizing the crisis following Bose's re-election as the Congress President in 1938. In Pune, he formed his League of Radical Congressmen. Disillusioned with both bourgeois democracy and communism, he devoted the last years of his life to the formulation of an alternative philosophy which he called Radical Humanism and of which he wrote a detailed exposition in Reason, Romanticism and Revolution.

In his biography, In Freedom's Quest, Sibnarayan Ray writes:

If Nehru had his problems, so had Roy. From early life his sharp intellect was matched by a strong will and extra-ordinary self-confidence. It would seem that in his long political career there were only two persons and a half who, in his estimate, qualified to be his mentors. The first was Jatin Mukherji (or Bagha Jatin) from his revolutionary nationalist period; the second was Lenin. The half was Joseph Stalin....

With the declaration of World War II, Roy (in a similar position as Sri Aurobindo) condemned the rising totalitarian regimes in Germany and Italy, instead supporting England and France in the fight against fascism. He severed connections with the Congress Party and created the Radical Democratic Party in 1940. Gandhi proceeded to lead the Quit India movement in August 1942. In response, the British colonial government imprisoned without trial nearly the entire Indian National Congress leadership. Roy's views clearly differed from the mainstream of the independence movement. According to Roy, a victory for Germany and the Axis powers would have resulted in the end of democracy worldwide and that India would never be independent. In his view, India could only win her independence in a free world.

Sensing India's independence to be a post-war reality following the defeat of the Axis powers and the weakening of the British Empire, Roy wrote a series of articles in Independent India on the economic and political structures of the new India, presenting a ten-year plan, and drafting a Constitution of Free India (1944).

Roy in his philosophy devised means to ensure human freedom and progress. Remembering Bagha Jatin who "personified the best of mankind", Roy worked "for the ideal of establishing a social order in which the best in man could be manifest." In 1947, he elaborated his theses into a manifesto, New Humanism, expected to be as important as the Communist Manifesto by Karl Marx a century earlier.

== Death and legacy ==
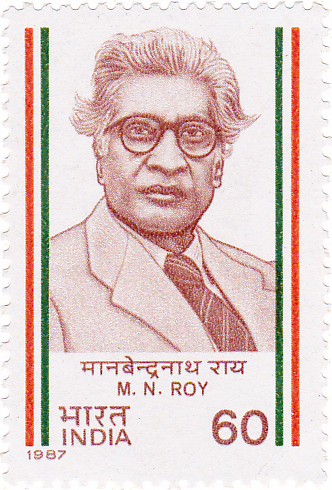
1987 stamp of India

A planned lecture tour to the United States was canceled on 25 January 1954 due to Roy's death from a heart attack.

Beginning in 1987, Oxford University Press began the publication of the Selected Works of M. N. Roy. A total of 4 volumes were published through to 1997, gathering Roy's writings through his prison years. Project editor Sibnarayan Ray died in 2008, however, so the project was prematurely terminated. Noted personalities like T. M. Tarkunde, Govardhandas Parekh, V. B. Karnik, Sunil Bhattacharya, B. R. Sunthankar, Saleel Wagh, V. R. Jawahire and Dr. Nalini Taralekar were influenced by M. N. Roy and his philosophy.

== See also ==
- Communist involvement in the Indian independence movement

== Bibliography ==
Note: Adapted from "A Checklist of the Writings of M.N. Roy" in M.N. Roy's Memoirs. Delhi: Ajanta Publications, 1984; pp. 607–617.

- La voz de la India (The Voice of India). Mexico City: n.p., n.d. [c. 1917].
- La India: Su Pasado, Su Presente y Su Porvenir (India: Its Past, Its Present, and Its Future). Mexico City: n.p., 1918.
- Indien (India). Hamburg: Verlag der Kommunistischen Internationale, 1922.
- India in Transition. With Abani Mukherji. Geneva: J.B. Target, 1922.
- What Do We Want? Geneva: J. B. Target, 1922.
- One Year of Non-Cooperation from Ahmedabad to Gaya. With Evelyn Roy. Calcutta: Communist Party of India, 1923. —Imprint probably fictitious.
- India's Problem and Its Solution. n.c.: n.p., n.d. [c. 1923].
- Political Letters. Zurich: Vanguard Bookshop, 1924. —Alternate title: Letters to Indian Nationalists.
- Cawnpore Conspiracy Case: An Open Letter to the Rt. Hon. J. R. MacDonald. London: Indian Defence Committee, 1924.
- The Aftermath of Non-Cooperation: Indian Nationalism and Labour Politics. London: Communist Party of Great Britain, 1926.
- The Future of Indian Politics. London: R. Bishop [Communist Party of Great Britain], 1926.
- Our Task in India. n.c.: Bengal Committee of the Revolutionary Party of the Indian Working Class, n.d. [c. 1932].
- "I Accuse!" : From the Suppressed Statement of Manabendra Nath Roy on Trial for Treason before Sessions Court, Cawnpore, India. New York: Roy Defense Committee of India, 1932. —Title of unexpurgated Indian edition: My Defence.
- Congress at Crossroads, by a Congressman (M. N. Roy). Bombay: Independence of India League, [c. 1934].
- On Stepping Out of Jail. Bombay: V. B. Karnik, n.d. [c. 1936].
- Letters by M. N. Roy to the Congress Socialist Party, Written in 1934. Bombay: Renaissance Publishing Co., 1937.
- The Historical Role of Islam: An Essay on Islamic Culture. Bombay: Vora, 1937.
- Presidential Address of M. N. Roy, United Provinces Youths' Conference, 29 and 30 May 1937, Sitapur. Bombay: R. D. Nadkarni, n.d. [1937].
- Materialism and Spiritualism: Presidential Address of M. N. Roy at the 3rd Session of the Madras Presidency Radical Youths' Conference, Held at Madras on 25 July 1937. Bombay: R. D. Nadkarni, n.d. [1937].
- My Crime. Bombay: Ramesh D. Nadkarni, n.d. [c. 1937].
- The Russian Revolution: A Review and the Perspective. Calcutta: D. M. Library, n.d. [c. 1937].
- Presidential Address of Com. M.N. Roy, First Rajputana-Central India Students' Conference, Benwar, 1 and 2 January 1938. Bombay: n.p., n.d. [1938].
- All-India Sugar Mill Workers' Conference, Gorakhpur, Held on 30 April and 1 May 1938: Presidential Address by Manabendra Nath Roy. Gorakhpur: n.p., n.d. [1938].
- Fascism: Its Philosophy, Professions and Practice. Calcutta: D.M. Library, 1938.
- On the Congress Constitution. Calcutta: "Independent India" Office, 1938.
- Our Differences. With V. B. Karnik. Calcuta: Saraswaty Library, 1938.
- Our Problems. With V. B. Karnik. Calcutta; Barendra Library, 1938.
- Gandhi vs. Roy: Containing Com. Roy's Letter to Gandhiji, the Latter's Reply and the Former's Rejoinder. Bombay: V. B. Karnik, 1939.
- Heresies of the Twentieth Century: Philosophical Essays. Bombay: Renaissance Publishers, 1939.
- Presidential Address by M. N. Roy at the First All-India Conference of the League of Radical Congressmen, Poona, 27 and 28 June 1939. Bombay: n.p., n.d. [1939].
- Tripuri and After. Nasik: Radical Congressmen's League, n.d. [1930s].
- Which Way, Lucknow? By a Radical Congressman (M. N. Roy). Bombay: M. R. Shetty, n.d. [1930s].
- The Memoirs of a Cat. n.c. [Dehra Dun]: Renaissance Publishers, 1940.
- Whither Europe? Bombay: Vora, 1940.
- The Alternative. Bombay: Vora, 1940.
- From Savagery to Civilisation. Calcutta: Digest Book House, 1940.
- Gandhism, Nationalism, Socialism. Calcutta: Bengal Radical Club, 1940.
- Science and Superstition. Dera Dun: Indian Renaissance Association, 1940.
- Materialism: An Outline of the History of Scientific Thought. Dera Dun: Renaissance Publishers, 1940.
- World Crisis (International Situation). (contributor) Ahmedabad: Gujarat Radical Democratic People's Party, 1940.
- The Relation of Classes in the Struggle for Indian Freedom. Patna: Bihar Radical Democratic People's Party, n.d. [c. 1940].
- Science, Philosophy and Politics. Moradabad: J. S. Agarwal, n.d. [c. 1940].
- A New Path: Manifesto and Constitution of the Radical Democratic Party. Bombay: V. B. Karnik, n.d. [c. 1940].
- Twentieth Century Jacobinism: Role of Marxism in Democratic Revolution. Patna: Radical Democratic Party, n.d. [c. 1940].
- Some Fundamental Problems of Mass Mobilization. Calcutta: D. Goonawardhana, n.d. [c. 1940].
- My Differences with the Congress: Speech at Allahbad University, 27 November 1940. Bombay: V. B. Karnik, League of Radical Congressmen, n.d. [c. 1940].
- On Communal Question. With V. B. Karnik. Lucknow: A.P. Singh, n.d. [c. 1940].
- Culture at the Crossroads: Cultural Requisites of Freedom. Calcutta: Leftist Book Club, n.d. [1940s].
- Radical Democratic Party's Message to the USSR. Calcutta: D. Goonawardhan, n.d. [1940s].
- Presidential Address by Com. M. N. Roy at the Maharashtra Provincial Conference of the Radical Democratic Party held at Poona on 22 and 23 March 1941, Bombay: V. B. Karnik, n.d. [1941].
- The Ideal of Indian Womanhood. n.c. [Dehra Dun?]: Renaissance Publishers, 1941.
- Problem of the Indian Revolution. Bombay: Rajaram Panday, 1941.
- All-India Anti-Fascist Trade Union Conference: Presidential Address by M. N. Roy: Lahore, 29–30 November 1941. Lahore: M. A. Kahn, n.d. [1941].
- Scientific Politics: Lectures in the All India Political Study Camp, Dehradun, May and June 1940: Held under Auspices of All-India League of Radical Congressmen. Dehra Dun: Indian Renaissance Association, 1942.
- Freedom or Fascism? n.c. [Bombay?]: Radical Democratic Party, 1942.
- India and the War. (contributor) Lucknow: Radical Democratic Party, 1942.
- This War and Our Defence. Karachi: Sind Provincial Radical Democratic Party, 1942.
- War and Revolution: International Civil War. Madras: Radical Democratic Party, 1942.
- Origin of Radicalism in the Congress. Lucknow: S.S. Suri, 1942.
- Library of a Revolutionary: Being a List of Books for Serious Political Study. Lucknow: New Life Union, for the Indian Renaissance Association, 1942.
- This Way to Freedom: Report of the All-India Conference of the Radical Democratic Party held in December 1942. (contributor) Delhi: Radical Democratic Party, 1942.
- Nationalism: An Antiquated Cult. Bombay: Radical Democratic Party, n.d. [c. 1942].
- Nationalism, Democracy, and Freedom. Bombay: Radical Democratic Party, n.d. [c. 1942].
- Letters from Jail. n.c. [Dehra Dun?]: Renaissance Publishing, 1943.
- The Communist International. Delhi: Radical Democratic Party, 1943.
- What is Marxism? Bombay: n.p., 1943.
- The Future of Socialism: Talk to the Calcutta Students' Club, November 1943. Calcutta: Renaissance Publishers, n.d. [1943].
- Poverty or Plenty? Calcutta: Renaissance Publishers, 1943.
- Indian Labour and Post-war Reconstruction. Lucknow: A. P. Singh, 1943.
- Indian Renaissance Movement: Three Lectures. Calcutta: Renaissance Publishers, 1944.
- The Future of the Middle Class: Lecture Delivered in Poona on 29 May 1944, in the Annual Spring Lecture Series. Patna: Radical Democratic Party, n.d. [1944].
- Constitution of India, A Draft: Endorsed and Released for Public Discussion by the Central Secretariat of the Radical Democratic Party. Delhi: V. B. Karnik, 1944.
- Your Future: An Appeal to the Educated Middle Class. Issued by the Radical Democratic Party. Lucknow: Radical Democratic Party, 1944.
- Planning a New India. Calcutta: Renaissance Publishers, n.d. [c. 1944].
- National Government or People's Government? Calcutta: Renaissance Publishers, n.d. [c. 1944].
- Constitution of Free India, A Draft by M. N. Roy: Endorsed and Released for Public Discussion by the Radical Democratic Party. Delhi: Radical Democratic Party, 1945.
- The Last Battles of Freedom: Being the Report of the Calcutta Conference of the Radical Democratic Party, 27 to 30 December 1944. Delhi: Radical Democratic Party, n.d. [1945].
- Post-War Perspective: A Peep into the Future. Delhi: Radical Democratic Party, 1945.
- Future of Democracy in India: Being the Full Text of a Speech Delivered at a Public Meeting Held at the Town Hall, Lucknow, on 6 October 1945. Delhi: Radical Democratic Party, n.d. [1945].
- The Problem of Freedom. Calcutta: Renaissance Publishers, 1945.
- My Experiences in China. Calcutta: Renaissance Publishers, 1945.
- Sino-Soviet Treaty. Calcutta: Renaissance Publishers, 1947.
- Jawaharlal Nehru, Delhi: Radical Democratic Party, n.d. [c. 1945].
- INA and the August Revolution. Calcutta: Renaissance Publishers, 1946.
- Revolution and Counter-Revolution in China. Calcutta: Renaissance Publishers, 1946. —Published in German in 1931.
- A New Orientation: Statement on the International Situation. Delhi: Radical Democratic Party, 1946.
- A New Orientation: Review and Perspective of the International Struggle for a New World Order of Democratic Freedom, Economic Prosperity, and Cultural Progress. Dehra Dun: Radical Democratic Party, Bengal, 1946.
- New Orientation: Lectures Delivered at the Political Study Camp Held at Dehra Dun, from 8 to 18 May 1946. With Phillip Spratt. Calcutta: Renaissance Publishers, 1946.
- Radical Democratic Party Conference Inaugural Address: Bombay, 20th, 21st, 22 December 1946: Presidential Address and Resolutions. Bombay: V. B. Karnik, n.d. [1947].
- Principles of Radical Democracy: Adopted by the Third All-India Conference by the Radical Democratic Party of India held in Bombay, 26 to 29 December 1946. Delhi: Radical Democratic Party, 1947. —Attributed to Roy.
- Leviathan and Octopus. Delhi: Radical Democratic Party, n.d. [1947].
- Asia and the World: A Manifesto. Delhi: Radical Democratic Party, 1947.
- Science and Philosophy. Calcutta: Renaissance Publishers, 1947.
- New Humanism: A Manifesto. Calcutta: Renaissance Publishers, 1947.
- Beyond Communism. With Philip Spratt. Calcutta: Renaissance Publishers, 1947.
- A New Approach to the Communal Program: Lecture Delivered at the International Fellowship, Madras, 22 February 1941. Bombay: V. B. Karnik, n.d. [c. 1947].
- The Russian Revolution. Calcutta: Renaissance Publishers, 1949.
- India's Message. Calcutta: Renaissance Publishers, 1950.
- The Rhythm of Cosmos: Inaugural Address of the Second All-India Rationalist Conference at Tenali held on 9 and 10 February 1952. Tenali: n.p., n.d. [1952].
- Radical Humanism. New Delhi: n.p., 1952.
- Reason, Romanticism and Revolution. Calcutta: Renaissance Publishers, 1952.
- The Way Ahead in Asia. n.c.: British Information Service in Southeast Asia, n.d. [c. 1950s].
- Crime and Karma, Cats and Women. Calcutta: Renaissance Publishers, 1957.
- Memoirs. Bombay: Allied Publishers, 1964. —Reissued 1984.
