= Indian Social Institute =

Jesuit development centre based in India

Coordinates: 28°35′21.55″N 77°13′40.64″E

- Abbreviation: ISI
- Established: 1951; 75 years ago
- Location(s): 10, Institutional Area; New Delhi, India
- Director: Denzil Fernandes
- Periodicals: Social Action (quarterly); Legal News and Views (monthly); Women’s link (quarterly); Hashiye Ki Awaaz (monthly/Hindi)
- Affiliations: Jesuit, Catholic
- Website: www.isidelhi.org.in

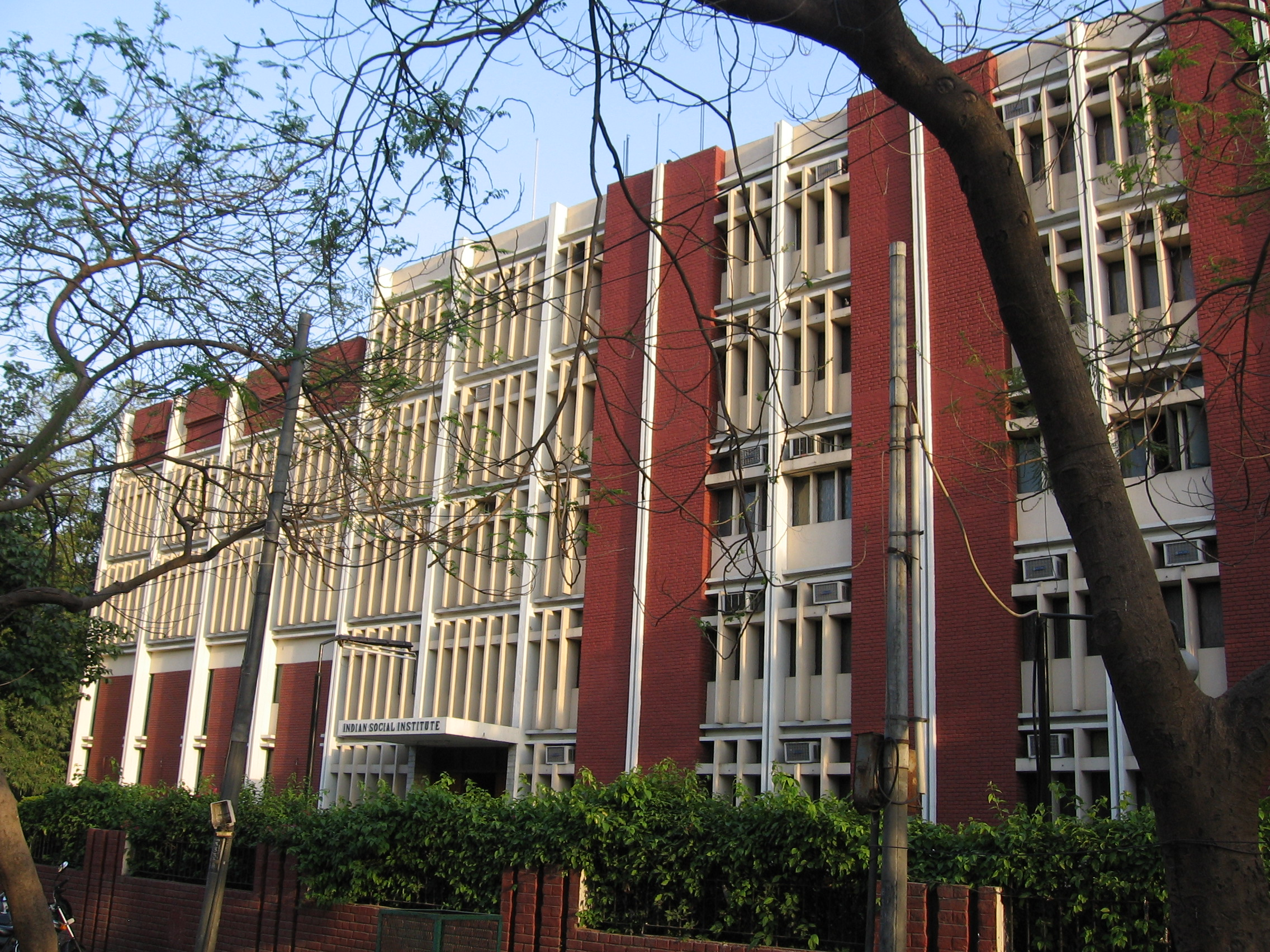
Indian Social Institute, Lodi Rd., New-Delhi

The Indian Social Institute (ISI), founded in 1951 in Pune (India), is a Jesuit centre for research, training, and action for socio-economic development and human rights in India. Founded by Jerome D'Souza, it was shifted from Pune to New Delhi in 1963 where it is located at the Lodi Institutional Area.

== Origin and foundation ==
Even though the Society of Jesus was active in the social field right from the end of the 19th century, following on the Rerum novarum encyclical of Leo XIII, it became more actively so after the second world war. In 1949, Superior General Jean-Baptiste Janssens wrote an ‘Instruction on the Social Apostolate’ (10 October 1949) - the first letter ever entirely given to this new apostolic field - calling for a new ‘social mentality’ among the Jesuits. To achieve this he asked that Jesuit formation programmes be revised, education curriculum in Jesuit schools and colleges be adapted, and centres specialized in social information and action be opened. Even the more spiritual kind of apostolic work (Marian congregation, Spiritual Exercises, and retreat work) were not to remain unaffected.

As a response to this, in 1951, the Indian Institute of Social Order was founded in Pune (India) by Jesuit Jerome D'Souza, a well-known educationist and member of the Indian Constituent Assembly. Started soon after the independence of India it was meant to help Indian Christians in general, and Jesuits in particular, to enter more actively into the issues of the common socio-economic national welfare. It was meant in the words of its founder to "contribute to the emergence of a new social order in post-independence India."

The quarterly journal Social Action was launched in 1951. Concurrently several regional training centres were established in various parts of the country, the Xavier Institute in Ranchi, Loyola School of Social Work in Madras (now Chennai), and another one in Trivandrum, (Kerala). The regional centres responded more directly to the demands coming from the field.

The Indian Institute of Social Order was transferred to New Delhi in 1963, under the leadership of Jean-Baptiste Moyersoen (1900–1969). In 1967 it was renamed Indian Social Institute. Notable sociological studies were published, such as the "Chotanagpur Survey", the first such study of the tribal groups of Central India, by Francisco Ivern. Under repeated demands coming from the social fields an extension service was started. One of its first ventures was to organize a cooperative movement among fishermen, most of them being bonded labourers. Setting up cooperatives became the main thrust of the extension service.

A tribal-orientated development group was started in the late 1960s, the Vikas Maitri, and a programme for women’s development in the 1970s, both fostering self dignity and awareness in marginalized groups. A Mobile Orientation Team was also started to reach out to peoples’ organizations at the grassroots level.

The FCRA license of the institute was revoked in the backdrop of having criticized certain policies of the Central Government.

== See also ==
- List of Jesuit sites
